= Richard Hasilden =

English politician

Richard Hasilden (died 1405), of Steeple Morden and Guilden Morden, Cambridgeshire, was an English politician.

He was a Member (MP) of the Parliament of England for Cambridgeshire in 1394 and 1399.

Parliament of England
Preceded by Sir John Colville; Sir Robert Denny	Member of Parliament for Cambridgeshire; 1394–1395; With: Sir Baldwin St George	Succeeded by Sir Edmund de la Pole; Thomas Hasilden
Preceded by John Tyndale; Thomas Hasilden	Member of Parliament for Cambridgeshire; 1399–1401; With: Sir Payn Tiptoft	Succeeded by Sir Baldwin St George; Thomas Hasilden
Political offices
Preceded by John Bois	High Sheriff of Bedfordshire and Buckinghamshire; 1404–1405	Succeeded by Edmund Hampden
