= John Cutts (died 1615) =

English politician

Sir John Cutts (or Cutt) (1545–1615), of Horham Hall, Essex; Shenley Hall, Hertfordshire and Childerley, Cambridgeshire, was an English politician.

Sir John's great-grandfather, also Sir John (died 1521), held the position of under-treasurer in the household of King Henry VII. His son John Cutts married Luce Browne, daughter of Sir Anthony Browne (died 1506) and granddaughter of John Neville, 1st Marquess of Montagu (died 1471) and Isabel Ingaldesthorpe. After John's death in 1528, leaving a son little more than an infant, Luce remarried to Sir Thomas Clyfford. The child married Sybil, daughter of Sir John Hynde of Madingley (who died in 1550), and being of age in 1547 became Sir John Cutts of Childerley and Horham Hall. This gentleman became implicated in a suspected conspiracy planned in Suffolk with his brother-in-law Sir Francis Hynde and, having gone into exile in Italy, died of pleurisy in Venice in May 1555. His widow Sybil (Hynde), mother of the present Sir John Cutts, M.P., remarried to the politician John Hutton.

John was educated at Trinity College, Cambridge and trained in the law at Gray's Inn. He was knighted by the Earl of Leicester in 1571. He was appointed a Justice of the Peace (JP) for Cambridgeshire in 1579, Hertfordshire in 1582 and Essex in 1586. He was a Member (MP) of the Parliament of England for Cambridgeshire 1584, 1586 and 1601. He served as Sheriff of Cambridgeshire and Huntingdonshire for 1572–73 and 1601-2 and as High Sheriff of Hertfordshire for 1588–89.

He married twice: first to Anne, the daughter of Sir Arthur Darcy of Huntingdonshire, with whom he had a son and two daughters, and secondly to Margaret, the daughter and coheiress of John Brocket of Brocket Hall, Hertfordshire, with whom he had another son. He was succeeded by his son John.

Parliament of England
Preceded by Francis Hynde with John Hutton	Member of Parliament for Cambridgeshire; 1584; With: John North	Succeeded by John North with John Cutts
Parliament of England
Preceded by John North with John Cutts	Member of Parliament for Cambridgeshire; 1586; With: John North	Succeeded by John North with Francis Hynde
Parliament of England
Preceded by Henry North with William Hynde	Member of Parliament for Cambridgeshire; 1601; With: John Cotton	Succeeded by Sir John Peyton, 1st Baronet with John Cutts
