= Francis Hynde =

16th-century English politician

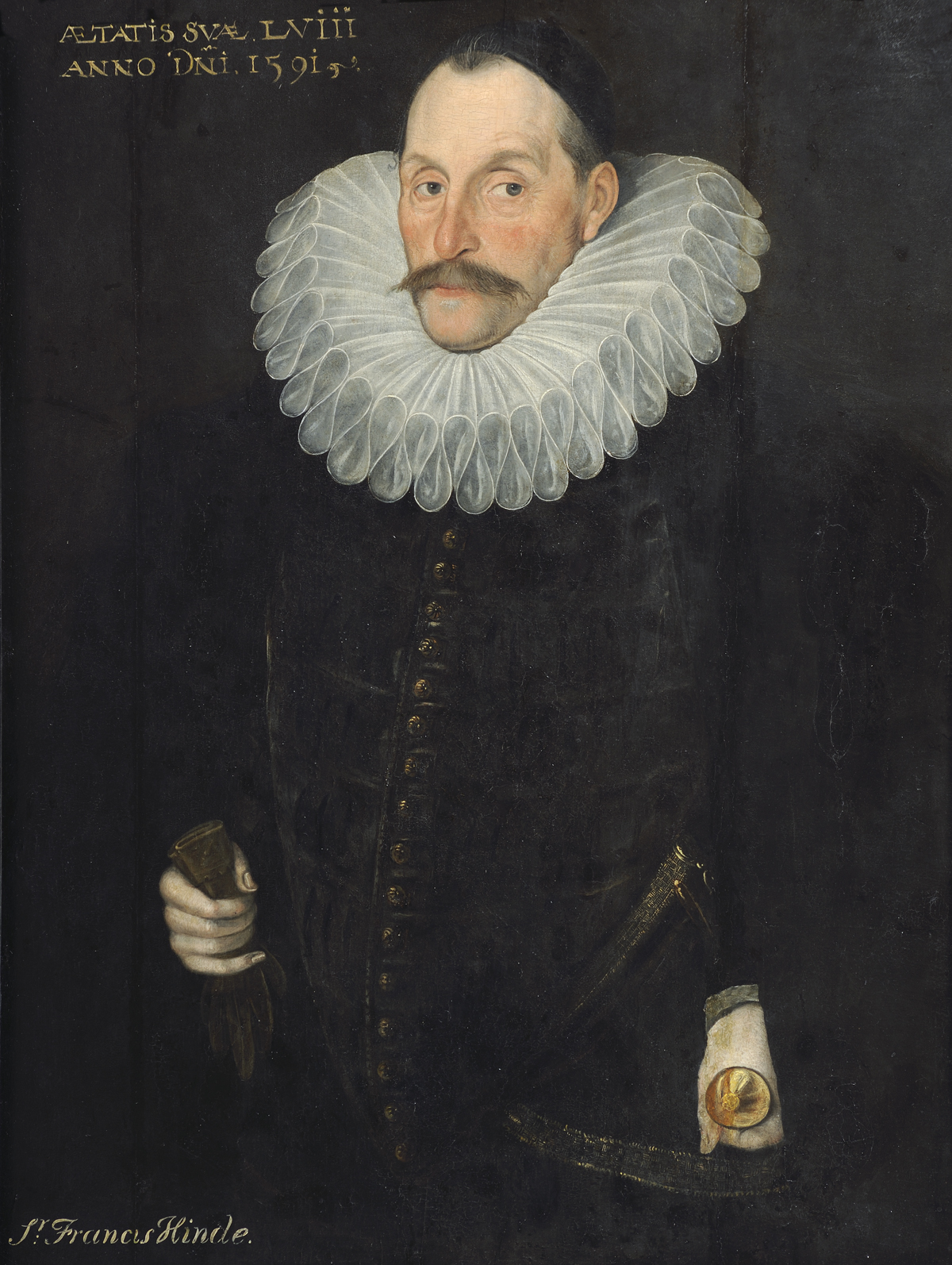
Sir Francis Hynde aged 58, painted in 1591 by Hieronymo Custodis: at Madingley Hall.

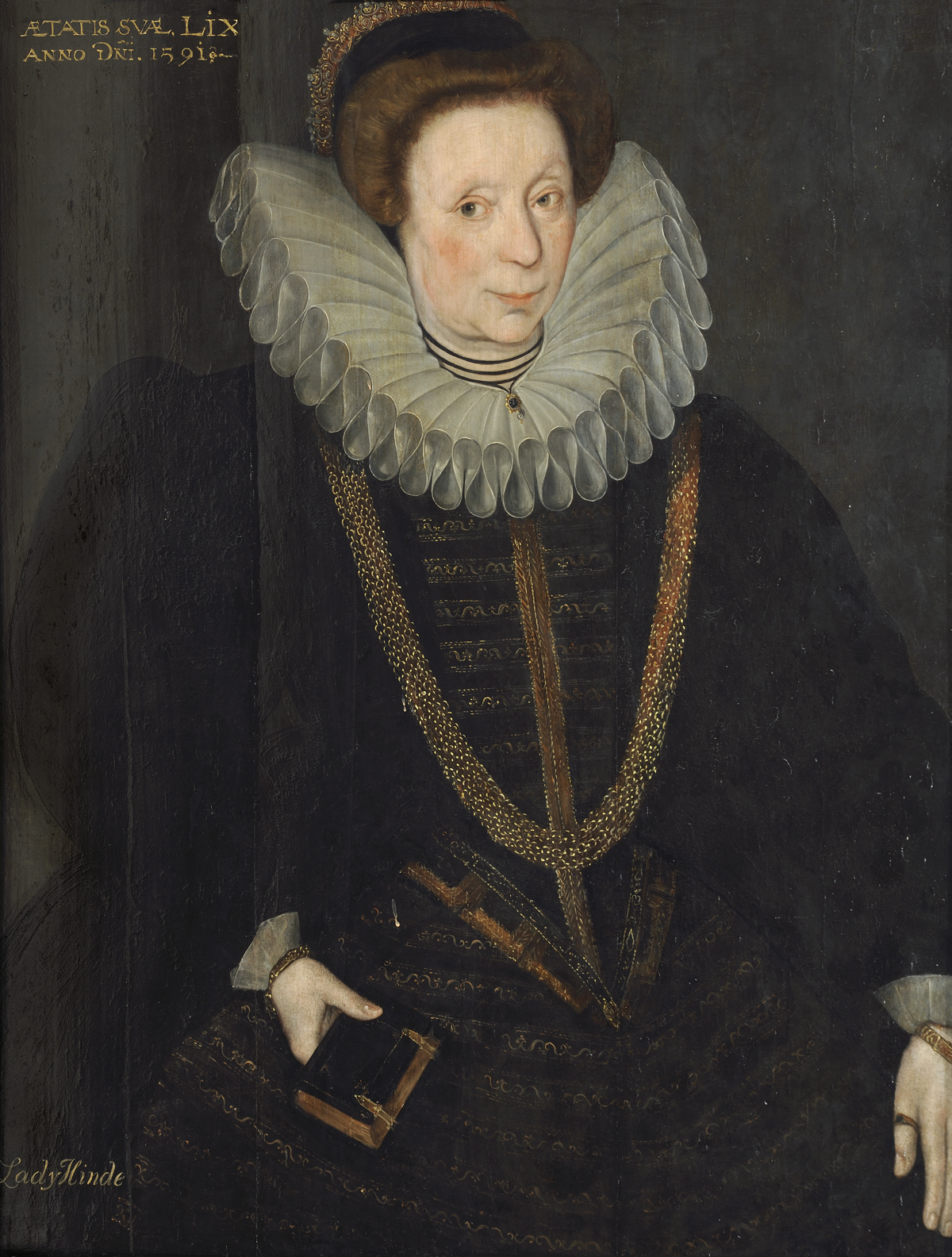
Lady Jane Hynde aged 59, painted in 1591 by Hieronymo Custodis: at Madingley Hall.

Sir Francis Hynde (c. 1532 – 21 March 1596), of Madingley, Cambridgeshire and Aldgate, London, was an English politician and landowner particularly associated with the development of Madingley Hall and its manorial estates.

== Family ==
Francis Hynde was the son of Sir John Hynde, M.P., of Madingley, and his wife Ursula, daughter of John Curson of Beck Hall, Billingford, Norfolk. He matriculated as pensioner from St John's College in the University of Cambridge in 1546 and was admitted at Gray's Inn in 1549. His younger brother Thomas matriculated from the same college in 1551 and entered Gray's Inn in 1552.

He married Jane, daughter of Sir Ralph Verney of Pendley Manor near Tring in Buckinghamshire. Lady Jane Hynde was therefore sister of Sir Edmund Verney (that was father to Edmund Verney the younger, the Knight Marshal), of Francis Verney, who was arraigned and condemned with Edward Lewknor for his part in the Henry Dudley conspiracy in June 1556, and also of Urian Verney, whose 1608 monument to his father in Middle Claydon church enumerates her among his own brothers and sisters as being a daughter of Sir Ralph's. Their elder son and heir, William Hynde, was also an M.P.

== Career ==
The Manors of Burlewas (or Burdeleys) and Marhams (or Harlestons) at Madingley, Cambridgeshire, were among the acquisitions of land made by Francis Hynde's father, Sir John Hynde, who was buying land in Madingley from the 1520s onwards. By the time he died in 1550 the manors had become combined, and remained so in the hands of his descendants and successors. The first so to inherit was his son Francis Hynde, who was of age in 1551.

In March 1555 Hynde was implicated, together with 'master Bowes and master Cutt' in a conspiracy suspected to have been planned in Suffolk, was committed into custody of Sir Giles Alington and not released from his recognizances until 1559. He was named Executor in the will of his brother-in-law Sir John Cutts of Childerley of 1554, who as a Marian exile died of pleurisy at Venice in May 1555 leaving a ten-year-old son. Hynde first sat as a Member (MP) of the Parliament of England for Cambridgeshire in 1559 and was three times selected to act as High Sheriff of Cambridgeshire and Huntingdonshire for 1561–62, 1570–71 and 1589–90.

There are various records of Hynde's dealings with Corpus Christi College. Between 1552 and 1561/62 he fell into dispute with the college over lands at Barton, Coton and Whitwell resulting in a suit against Hynde which was resolved in Chancery. For many years he withheld an annual rent of 50 shillings owing out of the Manor of Girton, which was eventually recovered for the college by the Master, Matthew Parker, with the assistance of Sir Nicholas Bacon. In 1570 Francis with his younger brother Thomas conveyed the Manor of Rycotes and the advowson of the church at Little Wilbraham, formerly their mother's property, to Trustees of Corpus for £830. In 1587 the Master Dr Robert Norgate purchased lands at Stow-cum-Quy from Sir Francis, but soon ran into trouble over questions of title. In the meantime two sons of Francis Hynde's passed through the college during the early 1570s.

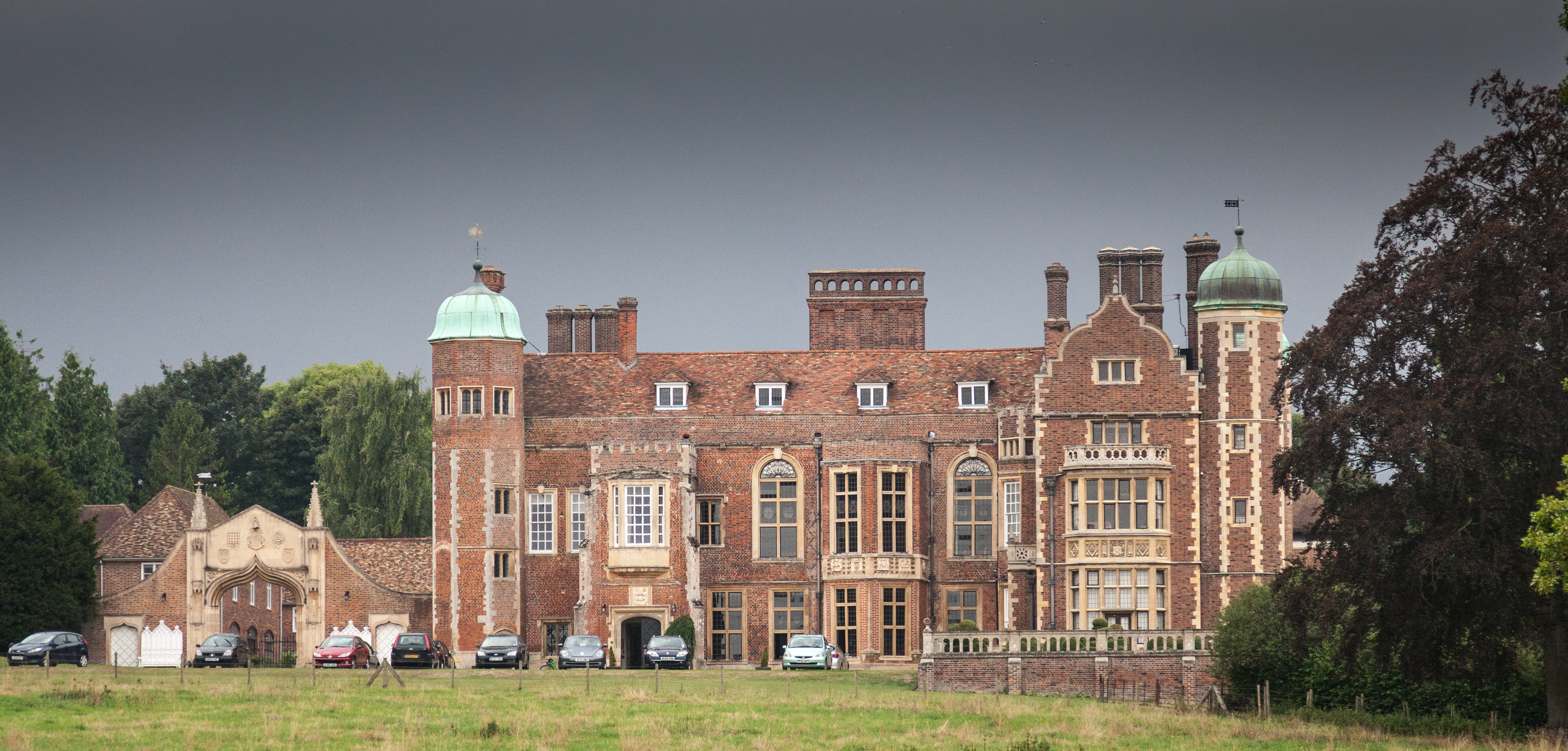
Madingley Hall, Cambridgeshire

He sat again as Member for Cambridgeshire in 1572 and 1589, alternating or sharing the County representation with John North and with his relatives John Cutts and John Hutton, who had married his sister Sybil Hynde after the death of the elder Sir John Cutts. Hynde was knighted in 1578. Between 1582 and 1589 Sir Francis acquired a further three hundred acres of freehold in Madingley. He continued the construction of Madingley Hall commenced by his father, in c. 1588–1591 adding the north wing. This included a multi-arched loggia below, with a first-floor long gallery 87 feet in length, set between two high turrets. It is likely that he made use of building materials from the demolition of the church of St Etheldreda at Histon, which occurred at around that time. The manor of Histon Eynsham, in which the church stood, had been sold to his father in 1550. A supposed haunting of Madingley Hall has been imagined to represent the figure of Sir Francis's mother, Lady Ursula Hynde, wringing her hands in grief over this action. If so, her distress was entirely posthumous, as Lady Ursula is reported to have died in 1555.

Sir Francis held the lordship of several manors in Cottenham, where his uses and enclosures of the common land led to prolonged discontent of the commoners, and an entangled legacy of rights, customs and restraints: he dying intestate in 1596, it was left to his son William, the heir and administrator of his estate, to cope with their various implications. Several of the Cambridge Colleges had interests in these lands.

Sir Francis died on 21 March 1595/96 at Madingley, aged 65, and was accorded an heraldic funeral at Madingley church. Lady Jane Hynde died in Chelsea in 1607/08, having outlived William, and was buried there on 23 February. At William's death in 1606 his widow, becoming the wife of Sir Arthur Capell, took over the Madingley farmlands and occupied them until her death in 1626, leasing the Hall to William's brother Edward from 1611.

== Children ==
The children of Sir Francis Hynde and Lady Jane née Verney are shown as follows:

- (Sir) William, son and heir (d. 1606), MP, married (1) (c. 1581) Elizabeth daughter of Thomas Lord Wentworth. He married secondly (c. 1597) Elizabeth, daughter of William Laurence of St Ives and widow of John Hutton, MP (who died in 1596). Hutton had first married Sybil Hynde, sister of Sir Francis. William Hynde matriculated Fellow-Commoner from Queens' College, University of Cambridge in 1572 and was knighted in 1603. He died without issue, and Elizabeth (Laurence) afterwards married Sir Arthur Capell.
- (Sir) Edward (d. c.1632), was admitted Fellow-Commoner at Corpus Christi College, Cambridge in 1571 and matriculated in 1572. The Cambridgeshire Visitation of 1619, seemingly made in his behalf, shows him to have married Allice daughter of John Billett of London, having several children. He became the husband of Mary Norton (daughter of Thomas Norton of Hinxton and Margaret St Lowe), but c.1630 remarried and was survived by his wife Barbara née Powell, relict of Francis Dayrell of Castle Camps, Cambridgeshire, and was therefore stepfather to Sir Thomas Dayrell. After his brother's death he succeeded to his father's estate, and was knighted in 1615.
- John. He was admitted Fellow-Commoner at Corpus Christi College in 1571, and matriculated in 1572 at the age of 10. He died without issue.
- Jane (d. 1633), married (1) William West of Goldington's manor, Marsworth, Buckinghamshire (d. 1583), (2) John Catesby of Newnham, Goldington (Bedford), (3) (in 1594) Edward Radclyffe, second son of Sir Humfrey Radcliff of Elstow, Bedfordshire.
- Ursula, married John Machell, J.P., of Hackney, Middlesex and Woodbury in Gamlingay, Cambridgeshire. Machell lost his Cambridgeshire estates through debt, but, in a judgement of Error, half of the manor of Woodbury was recovered in 1602, by Sir William Hynde on behalf of Ursula, from forfeiture to another creditor under Statute Staple for Merchandize, on the grounds that it had formed her marriage settlement secured upon a loan from Sir Francis Hynde which had never been repaid and was therefore held by Elegit.
