= Hasilden =

Hasilden is a surname. Notable people with the surname include:

- Thomas Hasilden (disambiguation), multiple people
- Richard Hasilden (died 1405), English politician

== See also ==
- Haselden
