= Elsbeth Dimsdale =

Dimsdale in 1923

Elsbeth Dimsdale CBE (17 December 1871 – October 1949), born Elsbeth Philipps, was a British health campaigner, University Lecturer and Liberal politician.

== Early life and education ==
Dimsdale was the daughter of James Erasmus Philipps, vicar of Warminster and prebendary of Salisbury Cathedral; her older brother, John, later became a Member of Parliament and was made a viscount. She studied at Somerville College, Oxford, where she received a first-class honours degree, and subsequently became the first woman to receive a college fellowship at the University of Cambridge. While at Cambridge, she founded the Women's University Club.

== Career ==
In 1902, Elsbeth married Marcus Dimsdale, and she began working for the Ministry of Health, while also undertaking voluntary work for Cambridgeshire County Council relating to public health. She gave birth to her fifth child in 1912, but the baby died of tuberculosis, and she thereafter focused her attention on the disease, founding the Papworth Tuberculosis Colony, and also campaigning to ensure TB was not present in milk for human consumption. For this work, she was made a Commander of the Order of the British Empire.

== Politics ==
Dimsdale was active in the Cambridgeshire Liberal Association, whose MP, Edwin Montagu, was a member of the Coalition government led by David Lloyd George. He, the local Liberal association and Dimsdale all went over to the newly formed National Liberal Party in 1922. She took an active part in the affairs of the new party at a national level, and was appointed as a joint Honorary Secretary of the Council of the National Liberal Party.

Montagu lost his seat at the 1922 General Election and chose to retire from politics. Dimsdale was selected to succeed him as candidate and following the merger of the two Liberal factions, she became Liberal Party candidate at the 1923 general election. She failed to win back the seat and did not run for parliament again.

General Election 1923: Cambridgeshire
| Party | Candidate | Votes | % | ±% |
|---|---|---|---|---|
| Unionist | Richard Briscoe | 11,710 | 43.6 | +5.6 |
| Labour | A. E. Stubbs | 8,554 | 31.8 | −3.5 |
| Liberal | Elsbeth Dimsdale | 6,619 | 24.6 | −2.1 |
| Majority | | 3,156 | 11.8 | +8.1 |
| Turnout | | 26,883 | 72.5 | +1.7 |
| Unionist hold | | Swing | +4.6 | |

She served as a Liberal member of Cambridgeshire County Council for some years.

During World War II, Dimsdale hoped to organise the evacuation of some British children to Canada.
