= Levinus Bennet =

English politician (1631–1693)

Sir Levinus Bennet, 2nd Baronet (1631 – 5 December 1693) was a British Tory politician.

He was the eldest son of Sir Thomas Bennet, 1st Baronet of Babraham, Cambridgeshire and his wife Mary Munck, daughter of Levinus Munck. In 1667, he succeeded his father as baronet.

Bennet was educated at Gray's Inn in 1644. He was appointed High Sheriff of Cambridgeshire and Huntingdonshire in 1652 and sat as Member of Parliament (MP) for Cambridgeshire from 1679 until his death in 1693.

On 6 July 1653, at All Hallows-on-the-Wall, London, he married Judith Boevey, the daughter of William Boevey (died 1661) of Flaxley Abbey, Gloucestershire, son of the Dutch-born Huguenot Andrew Boevey (died 1625), and brother of the merchant, lawyer and philosopher James Boevey (1622–1696). They had two sons and seven daughters. Bennet died in London and was buried in Babraham a week later. He was succeeded in the baronetcy by his only surviving son, Richard.

Parliament of England
Preceded by Gerard Russell; Edward Partherich	Member of Parliament for Cambridgeshire; 1679–1693; With: Sir Robert Cotton	Succeeded by Sir Robert Cotton; The Lord Cutts
Baronetage of England
Preceded by Thomas Bennet	Baronet (of Baberham); 1667–1693	Succeeded by Richard Bennet
