= Chalers =

Chalers is a surname. Notable people with the surname include:

- John Chalers (1361–1388), English politician
- Thomas Chalers (1383–1443), English politician
