= Tiptoft =

Tiptoft is a surname. Notable people with the surname include:

- John Tiptoft (disambiguation), multiple people
- Baron Tiptoft
- Payn Tiptoft (c. 1351–c. 1413), English politician
