= January 1874 Cambridgeshire by-election =

UK Parliamentary by-election

The 1874 Cambridgeshire by-election was fought on 3 January 1874. The byelection was fought due to the Succession to a peerage of the incumbent MP of the Conservative Party, Viscount Royston. It was won by the Conservative candidate Elliot Yorke who was unopposed.
