= John Hore (MP for Cambridgeshire) =

English politician

John Hore (died c. 1434), of Great Childerley, Cambridgeshire and Great Raveley, Huntingdonshire, was an English politician.

He acquired landholdings from each of his three marriages.

He was a Member (MP) of the Parliament of England for Cambridgeshire in 1415 and 1425 and for Huntingdonshire in October 1426.

He married firstly Joan, the daughter of Anne, the daughter of William Ellesfield of Ellesfield and Chalgrove, Oxfordshire, coheiress of the estates of Sir Baldwin Berford, and had one son, Gilbert.

He married secondly another Joan, the daughter of Sir Edmund Vauncy of Westley Waterless, Cambridgeshire and widow of Thomas Priour, MP of Hatfield Broad Oak, Essex, coheiress of Sir William Moigne of Sawtry and Great Raveley.

He married thirdly Margaret, the widow of Sir Robert Butveleyn of Flordon, Norfolk.

His only son Gilbert became MP for Cambridgeshire.
