= Edward Hicks (MP) =

English politician (1814–1889)

Edward Hicks (1814 – 13 January 1889), born Edward Simpson, was an English Conservative Party politician who sat in the House of Commons from 1879 to 1885.

Hicks was the son of Edward Simpson of Lichfield and his wife Elizabeth Anderson, daughter of William Anderson of Moseley, Worcestershire. He was educated at Charterhouse School and at Corpus Christi College, Oxford. In 1835 he changed his name from Simpson to Hicks. He entered Inner Temple in 1837. He was a J.P. and deputy lieutenant for Cambridgeshire. In 1862 he was High Sheriff of Cambridgeshire and vice-chairman of the Quarter Sessions. He was chairman of the local Chamber of Agriculture.

Hicks was elected as a member of parliament (MP) for Cambridgeshire at a by-election in January 1879 following the death of Elliot Yorke MP. He was re-elected in 1880 and held the seat until the constituency was divided by the Redistribution of Seats Act 1885. At the 1885 general election he unsuccessfully contested the newly created Newmarket division of Cambridgeshire.

Hicks died at the age of 74.

Hicks married Grace Pipe-Wolferstan, daughter of Stanley Pipe-Wolferstan of Statfold Staffordshire in 1838.

Parliament of the United Kingdom
Preceded by Elliot Yorke; Benjamin Rodwell; Henry Brand	Member of Parliament for Cambridgeshire; 1879 – 1885; With: Benjamin Rodwell to 1881; Henry Brand to 1884; James Redfoord Bulwer 1881–85; Arthur John Thornhill 1884–85	Constituency divided
