= Thomas Hasilden =

Thomas Hasilden may refer to:

- Thomas Hasilden (died c. 1387), MP for Cambridgeshire
- Thomas Hasilden (died c. 1404), MP for Cambridgeshire
