= Walter de la Pole =

English politician

Sir Walter de la Pole (November 1371 – 1434), of Dernford in Sawston, Cambridgeshire, was an English politician.

== Family ==
Walter was the son and heir of the MP Sir Edmund de la Pole and his second wife.

== Career ==
He was a member (MP) of the parliament of England for Cambridgeshire in 1411, November 1414, 1417, May 1421, 1422, 1423 and 1427.
