= William Goodred =

English politician

William Goodred or Godred (died c. 1448), of Horseheath, Cambridgeshire and Middleton, Norfolk, was an English politician.

== Family ==
Goodred was the son of William Goodred of Horseheath, probably by his wife Joan. Goodred married Katherine née Shuldham of Marham, Norfolk, who had twice been widowed.

== Career ==
He was a member (MP) of the parliament of England for Cambridgeshire in 1419.
