= Richard Moore (Liberal politician) =

British journalist and politician (1931–2019)

Richard Gillachrist Moore (20 February 1931 – 15 May 2019), was a British journalist and Liberal Party politician. He was a leader writer at the News Chronicle and speechwriter to the Liberal Party Leader.

== Background ==
Moore was born in London, the younger son of Sir Alan Moore and Hilda Mary Burrows. He was educated at Highfield School, Liphook and Radley College, Berkshire, gaining an exhibition to Trinity College, Cambridge, in 1949. He was President of Cambridge University Liberal Club in 1953 and President of Cambridge Union in 1955. He was also Chairman of the Union of University Liberal Societies.

In 1955 he married Ann Miles. They had two sons Charles and Rowan, and daughter, seven grandchildren and a great-granddaughter.

== Professional career ==
Moore was a leader writer for the News Chronicle (1956–60). He was secretary to the Liberal peers from 1960 and then political secretary and speechwriter to Jeremy Thorpe from 1967 to 1973. He was secretary general of Liberal International.

== Political career ==
Moore was Liberal candidate for Tavistock at the general elections of 1955 and 1959, Cambridgeshire 1961 and 1964, North Antrim 1966 and 1970 and North Norfolk in both 1974 elections. He did not stand for parliament again. He was Liberal candidate in the 1984 European Elections for Somerset and Dorset West.

=== Electoral record ===
General election 1955: Tavistock
Party	Candidate	Votes	%	±%
Conservative	Henry Studholme	18,991	54.8	
Labour	Harold Lawrance	8,755	25.2	
Liberal	Richard Moore	6,937	20.0	
Majority		10,236	29.5	
Turnout		34,683	76.9	
Conservative hold		Swing		

General election 1959: Tavistock
Party	Candidate	Votes	%	±%
Conservative	Henry Studholme	19,778	53.7	
Liberal	Richard Moore	9,008	24.5	
Labour	Bryan R Weston	8,022	21.8	
Majority		10,770	29.3	
Turnout		36,808	78.5	
Conservative hold		Swing		

1961 Cambridgeshire by-election
Party	Candidate	Votes	%	±%
Conservative	Francis Pym	17,643	45.9	−12.0
Labour	Robert M D Davies	11,566	30.1	−12.0
Liberal	Richard Moore	9,219	24.0	n/a
Majority		6,077	15.8	+0.0
Turnout		38,428	62.4	−15.6
Conservative hold		Swing	+0.0	

General election 1964: Cambridgeshire
Party	Candidate	Votes	%	±%
Conservative	Francis Pym	24,883	48.0	+2.1
Labour	Evan L Rutherford	17,636	34.0	+3.9
Liberal	Richard Moore	9,347	18.0	−6.0
Majority		7,247	14.0	
Turnout		51,866	79.8	+17.4
Conservative hold		Swing	−0.9	

General election 1966: North Antrim
Party	Candidate	Votes	%	±%
UUP	Henry Clark	31,927	78.1	–12.0
Ulster Liberal	Richard Moore	8,941	21.9	n/a
Majority		22,986	56.2	–24.1
Turnout		40,868	56.7	–6.4
Registered electors		72,039		
UUP hold		Swing		

General election 1970: North Antrim
Party	Candidate	Votes	%	±%
Protestant Unionist	Ian Paisley	24,130	41.2	n/a
UUP	Henry Clark	21,451	36.6	–41.5
NI Labour	Patrick McHugh	6,476	11.0	n/a
National Democratic	Alasdair McDonnell	4,312	7.4	n/a
Ulster Liberal	Richard Moore	2,269	3.9	–18.0
Majority		2,679	4.6	–51.6
Turnout		58,638	73.4	+16.7
Registered electors		79,930		
Protestant Unionist gain from UUP		Swing		

General election February 1974: North Norfolk
Party	Candidate	Votes	%	±%
Conservative	Ralph Howell	35,684	47.6	−7.7
Labour	D. M. Mason	21,394	28.6	−16.1
Liberal	Richard Moore	17,853	23.8	
Majority		14,290	19.0	+8.5
Turnout		74,931	83.4	+3.1
Conservative hold		Swing		

General election October 1974: North Norfolk
Party	Candidate	Votes	%	±%
Conservative	Ralph Howell	33,312	48.1	+0.5
Labour	D. M. Mason	22,191	32.0	+3.4
Liberal	Richard Moore	13,776	19.9	−3.9
Majority		11,121	16.1	−2.9
Turnout		69,279	76.5	−6.9
Conservative hold		Swing		

European Parliament election, 1984: Somerset and Dorset West
Party	Candidate	Votes	%	±%
Conservative	Margaret Daly	98,928	50.9	n/a
Liberal	Richard Moore	58,677	30.2	n/a
Labour	Jane Linden	38,863	18.9	n/a
Majority		40,251	20.7	n/a
Turnout			36.0	n/a
Conservative win (new seat)				
