= Robert Denny =

Robert Denny may refer to:

- Sir Robert Arthur Denny, 5th Baronet (1838–1921), Anglo-Irish baronet and army officer
- Bob Denny, American software developer
- Robert Denny (MP) (died 1419), member of parliament for Cambridgeshire

== See also ==
- Denny (surname)
- Robert V. Denney (1916–1981), American politician and judge
