= Thomas Wykes =

Thomas Wykes may refer to:

- Thomas Wykes (chronicler) (1222–1291/93), English chronicler
- Thomas Wykes (MP for Leominster) (fl. 1554), MP for Leominster
- Thomas Wykes (MP for Cambridgeshire) (died c. 1430), MP for Cambridgeshire
