= Thomas Rudston =

16th-century English politician

Thomas Rudston (by 1507 – 1556), of Swaffham Bulbeck, Cambridgeshire, was an English politician.

== Education ==
Rudston was educated at Gray's Inn.

== Career ==
He was a member (MP) of the parliament of England for Cambridgeshire in 1542.
