= Nicholas Morys =

English politician

Nicholas Morys (fl. 1414), of Trumpington, Cambridgeshire, was an English politician.

== Family ==
Morys had married s woman named Margaret, and they had one son, the MP, John.

== Career ==
He was a member (MP) of the parliament of England for Cambridgeshire in April 1414.
