= William Alington (speaker) =

English politician (died 1446)

William Alington (died 19 October 1446), lord of the manor of both Bottisham and Horseheath, Cambridgeshire, was Speaker of the House of Commons of England, Treasurer of the Exchequer of Ireland, Treasurer of Normandy and High Sheriff of Cambridgeshire and Huntingdonshire.

== Biography ==
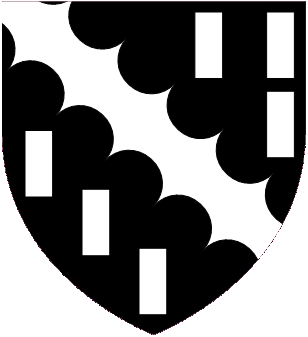
Arms: Sable a bend engrailed between six billets Argent.

William Alington is said to have been the son of William Alington and Denise Malet. He married Joan (d.1446), said to have been the daughter of William Burgh and the widow of one Barnes.

Alington was appointed High Sheriff of Cambridgeshire and Huntingdonshire in 1414 and 1423. He was elected to Parliament in 1410, 1416 and 1429 as Knight of the Shire for Cambridgeshire and elected Speaker of the House in 1429.

He was Privy Councillor to Henry IV and Henry V. He was very close to Henry V's younger brother Thomas of Lancaster, Duke of Clarence, who was Lord Lieutenant of Ireland 1404-13. Alington accompanied him to Ireland and served as Lord Treasurer of Ireland. Later he served in Normandy and held several high offices, including Treasurer and Receiver-General.

== Family ==
Alington's two sons, William (d. 5 July 1459), of Horseheath, and Robert, of Bottisham, both married daughters of the famous Sir John Argentyne of Great Wymondley Manor, Hertfordshire, by his wife Margaret Calthorpe (1380–1427). By this marriage William Alington the younger acquired the manor of Wymondley, which was held in Grand Sergeanty by the service of presenting the first cup at the Coronation of Kings of England, which service was performed by the Lords of that Manor into the 20th century.

== Notes ==
Political offices
Preceded by Sir John Tyrell	Speaker of the House of Commons; 1429-1430	Succeeded by Sir John Tyrell
