= John Hynde =

Sir John Hynde (died October 1550) was an English judge, prominent in the reign of Henry VIII.

== Life ==
John Hynde and his brother Thomas were probably not from a family of Cambridgeshire origins, but having studied in the University of Cambridge became settled at Madingley in Cambridgeshire by 1518. He was called to the bar at Gray's Inn, and was reader there in 1517, 1527, and 1531. In 1520 he was elected Recorder of Cambridge, and in 1521-22 was Steward of the Rectory Manor of Cottenham. The parsonage of Madingley was demised to him (as resident of Girton) on a 99-year lease by Barnwell Priory in c.1524-25. His name appears frequently in the commission of the peace and commissions to collect subsidies for Cambridgeshire in the middle of the reign of Henry VIII. In 1526 and 1530 he was in the commission of gaol delivery for the town of Cambridge, and in 1529 in the commission to hear chancery causes, and was recommended by the Lord Chief Justice in 1530 as among the best counsel of the day.

By c.1530 John Hynde had married Ursula Curson, (daughter of Sir John Curson of Beck Hall, in Billingford and Bylaugh, Norfolk,) and in 1534 he oversaw the marriage settlement for his sister Margaret Hynde to George, a son of Sir William and Dame Jane Turville of Aston Flamville, Leicestershire.

In 1532 he was in the commission of the peace for Huntingdonshire, and in 1534 in the commission of sewers for the same county. In 1531 he was appointed Serjeant-at-law, and on 2 January 1535 was promoted to be King's serjeant. In 1536 he prosecuted the rebels in the west, and during the northern rebellion was one of those appointed to reside in Cambridgeshire, and to be responsible for order there. In December 1540 he received a commission from the Privy Council to inquire into charges of sedition alleged against Thomas Goodrich, Bishop of Ely for having participated in translating a work by Philip Melanchthon.

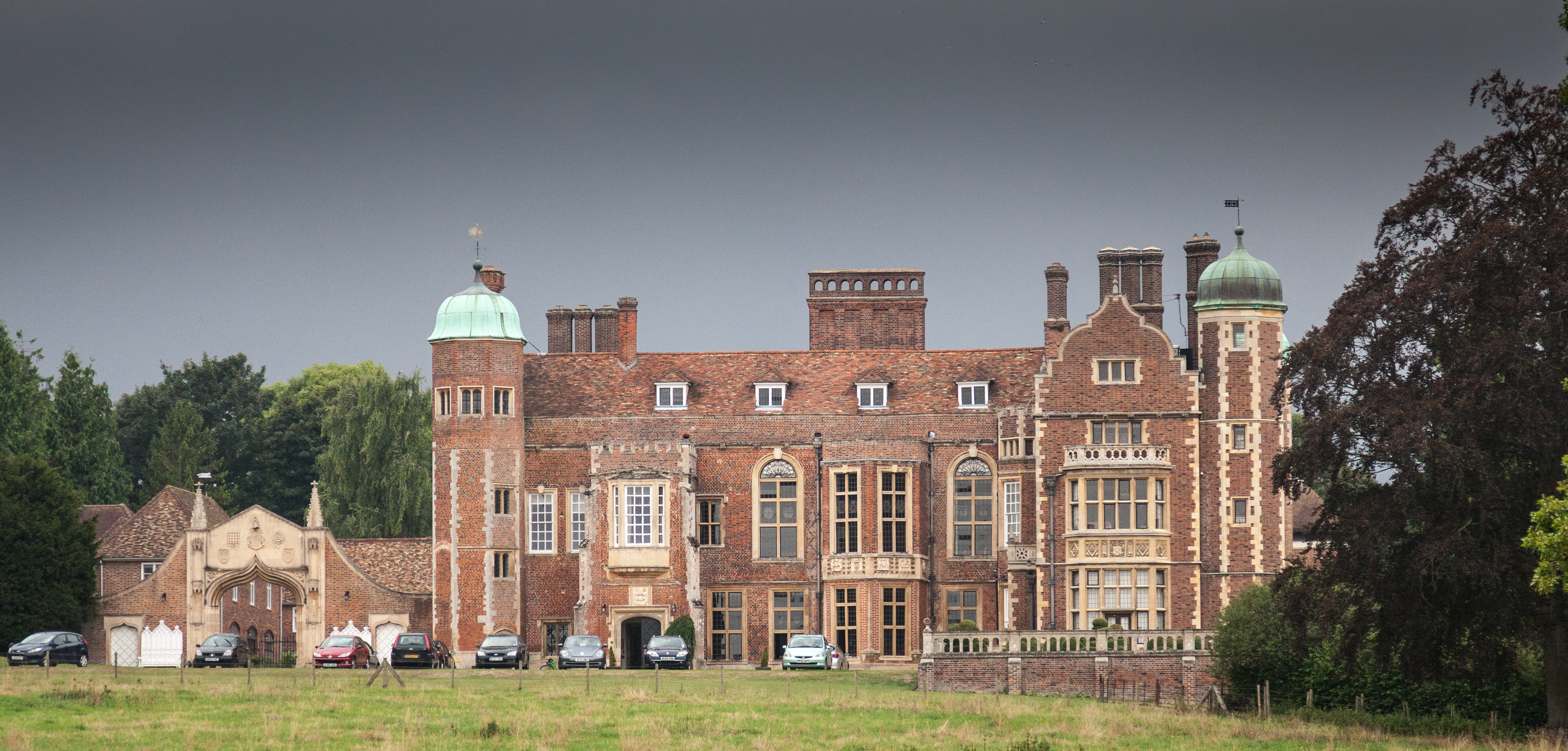
Madingley Hall, built by Sir John Hynde and his son Sir Francis Hynde

In 1539 he was granted (as a result of the Dissolution of the Monasteries) the property later known as Anglesey Abbey, together with the whole of its estate at Bottisham which he had previously held on lease. An act of parliament, 34–35 Hen. VIII (1542–43), c. 24, was passed to confirm to him and his heirs the 'Shire manor' of Burlewas or Burdeleys in Cambridgeshire and lands at Madingley, subject to an annual charge for the payment of the knights of the shire. In addition to this property it appears, from grants in the Augmentation office, that he received portions of the church lands at Girton and Moor Barns in Madingley. On 4 November 1545 he was knighted, was next day appointed a judge of the common pleas, and became a member of the Council of the North in 1545.

Sir John died in October 1550, and was accorded an heraldic funeral at St. Dunstan's, Fleet Street, London, on 18 October, the ceremonial being repeated at the Month's mind at Madingley under the direction of Dame Ursula. A description of his armorials at St. Dunstan's survives. Dame Ursula died testate in 1555.

== Children ==
The children of Sir John and Lady Ursula née Curson are shown as follows:

- (Sir) Francis Hynde (c.1531-1596), M.P., of Madingley. He studied at St John's College, Cambridge and married Jane, daughter of Sir Ralph Verney of Pendley.
- Thomas Hynde. He studied at St John's College, Cambridge and was admitted to Gray's Inn in 1552. He married Miss Pagenham of Tooting, Surrey.
- Catherin, married (?Geoffrey) Colvile of Marsh Newton, Isle of Ely, Cambridgeshire.
- Sybil, married (1) Sir John Cutts of Childerley, Cambridgeshire, who died 1555, and (2) John Hutton, M.P. for Cambridgeshire.
- Mary, married Clement Chicheley of Wimpole, Cambridgeshire.
- Anne, married (1) John Paris of Linton, Cambridgeshire, and (2) Roland Masters.
