= Thomas Chalers =

English politician

Thomas Chalers or Deschalers (17 September 1383 – 1443), of Whaddon, Cambridgeshire and Wyddial, Hertfordshire, was an English politician.

== Family ==
Chalers was the son and heir of the MP, Sir John Chalers. He married at some point before May 1407, a woman named Margaret. They had one son, Sir John Chalers, also an MP.

== Career ==
He was a member (MP) of the parliament of England for Cambridgeshire in 1417 and was selected High Sheriff of Cambridgeshire and Huntingdonshire for 1426–27.
