= William Papworth =

English politician

Sir William Papworth (c. 1331 – 4 September 1414), of Grafham (then in Huntingdonshire, now Cambridgeshire) and Papworth St. Agnes (Cambridgeshire), was an English politician.

He was a member (MP) of the parliament of England for Cambridgeshire in 1372, 1381, May 1382 and 1386; and for Huntingdonshire in 1385.
