= Cambridgeshire (UK Parliament constituency) =

Parliamentary constituency in the United Kingdom, 1801-1885 & 1918–1983

- Former county constituency for the House of Commons

1290–1885
- Seats: 2 (1290 – 1832); 3 (1832 – 1885)
- Replaced by: Chesterton; Newmarket; Wisbech

1918–1983
- Seats: one
- Created from: Chesterton; Newmarket
- Replaced by: SE Cambridgeshire; SW Cambridgeshire

Cambridgeshire is a former Parliamentary constituency in the United Kingdom. It was a constituency represented by two Members of Parliament in the House of Commons of the Parliament of England then in the Parliament of Great Britain from 1707 to 1800 and in the Parliament of the United Kingdom from 1801 to 1832, when its representation was increased to three until it was abolished in 1885.

It was reconstituted as a single-member seat in 1918 and abolished once again in 1983.

== History ==
The county was represented by two Knights of the Shire until 1832, when the number of members was increased to three by the Great Reform Act. Under the Redistribution of Seats Act 1885, the constituency was abolished and was divided into three single-member constituencies: the Western or Chesterton Division, the Eastern or Newmarket Division and the Northern or Wisbech Division.

Under the Local Government Act 1888, the historic county of Cambridgeshire was divided between the administrative counties of Cambridgeshire and Isle of Ely. When the parliamentary constituencies were next redistributed under the Representation of the People Act 1918, Cambridgeshire was re-constituted as a single-member Parliamentary County, largely formed from combining the Chesterton Division (excluding areas that were now part of the expanded Municipal Borough of Cambridge) and the Newmarket Division (excluding the city of Ely which was included in the Parliamentary County of Isle of Ely).

The administrative counties of Cambridgeshire and Isle of Ely had been recombined in 1965 and Cambridgeshire was further expanded in 1974 to include Huntingdon and Peterborough under the Local Government Act 1972. Under the subsequent redistribution of seats, which did not come into effect until the 1983 general election, Cambridgeshire was abolished as a county constituency, forming the bulk of the new constituency of South East Cambridgeshire and the majority of South West Cambridgeshire.

== Boundaries ==
=== Prior to 1885 ===
1290–1653, 1658-1885: The historic county of Cambridgeshire. (Although Cambridgeshire contained the borough of Cambridge, which elected two MPs in its own right, this was not excluded from the county constituency, and owning property within the borough could confer a vote at the county election. In the elections of 1830 and 1831, about an eighth of the votes cast for the county came from within Cambridge itself. The city of Ely also elected its own MPs in 1295.)

1654–1658: The historic county was divided for the First and the Second Protectorate Parliaments, between the two-member Isle of Ely area and the four-member constituency consisting of the rest of the county.

=== 1918–1983 ===
- The administrative county of Cambridgeshire, excluding the Municipal Borough of Cambridge.

There were minor boundary changes in 1950, when some of the constituency was transferred to the Cambridge seat, which was expanded to align with the Municipal Borough, and in 1974, to align with changes to the county boundary.

== Members of Parliament ==
- Constituency created (1290)

=== MPs 1290-1660 ===
Year	First member	Second member
1372	William Papworth	
1373	Henry English	
1377 (Oct)	Henry English	
1381	William Papworth	
1382 (May)	William Papworth	
1383	John Andrew	
1383 (Oct)	Henry English	
1384 (Nov)	Henry English	
1386	Sir William Papworth	Thomas Hasilden I
1388 (Feb)	Sir John Engaine	Sir John Chalers
1388 (Sep)	Sir John Engaine	Robert Parys
1390 (Jan)	Henry English	Simon Burgh
1390 (Nov)	Sir John Colville	Simon Burgh
1391	Sir Robert Denny	Simon Burgh
1393	Sir John Colville	Sir Robert Denny
1394	Sir Baldwin St George	Richard Hasilden
1395	Sir Edmund de la Pole	Thomas Hasilden II
1397 (Jan)	Sir Thomas Skelton	Thomas Hasilden II
1397 (Sep)	John Tyndale	Thomas Hasilden II
1399	Sir Payn Tiptoft	Richard Hasilden
1401	Sir Baldwin St George	Thomas Hasilden II
1402	Thomas Priour	John Hobildod
1404 (Jan)	Sir Payn Tiptoft	John Brunne
1404 (Oct)	Sir Baldwin St George	William Standon
1406	Sir Baldwin St George	William Asenhill
1407	Sir John Howard	(Sir) John Rochford
1410	William Alington	
1411	Sir Walter de la Pole	John Hobildod
1413 (Feb)		
1413 (May)	William Porter	John Burgoyne
1414 (Apr)	Sir Baldwin St George	Nicholas Morys
1414 (Nov)	Sir Walter de la Pole	Thomas Lopham
1415	John Hore	Nicholas Huish
1416 (Mar)	John Hobildod	Thomas Wykes
1416 (Oct)	William Alington	Sir William Asenhill
1417	Sir Walter de la Pole	Thomas Chalers
1419	John Burgoyne	William Goodred
1420	Nicholas Caldecote	Thomas Camp
1421 (May)	Sir Walter de la Pole	William Freville
1421 (Dec)	John Burgoyne	William Fulbourn
1425	John Hore	
1429	William Alington of Bottisham	
1431	Laurence Cheyne	
1432	Laurence Cheyne	Henry Somer
1433	William Alington of Horseheath	
1435	Laurence Cheyne	
1436	William Alington of Horseheath	
1437	Gilbert Hore	William Allington
1439/40	William Allington	William Cotton
1442	Laurence Cheyne	Thomas Burgoyne
1445/46	John Ansty the younger	Edmund Ingeldesthorp
1447	William Cotton	John Moris
1449 (Feb)	Sir John Say	Edmund Ingeldesthorp
1449/50 (Nov)	John Cheyne	Thomas Tynderne
1450/51	John Ansty the younger	Thomas Tynderne
1453/54	William Cotton	Edmund Ingeldesthorp
1455/56	John Ansty	Thomas Lockton
1459		
1460/61		
1461/62	John Ansty(son of John Ansty in 1445)	
1463/65		
1467/68	John Ansty	William Frevill
1472/75	Sir William Allington	Thomas Grey
1478	Sir William Allington	Thomas Grey
1491/2	John Burgoyne	William Finderne
1510–1523	No names known	
1529	Robert Peyton	Giles Alington
1536		
1539	Sir Giles Alington	Sir Thomas Elyot
1542	Edward North	Thomas Rudston
1545		
1547	(Sir) Edward North	James Dyer
1553 (Mar)	(Sir) Edward North	James Dyer
1553 (Oct)	Sir John Huddleston	Sir John Cotton
1554 (Apr)	Sir John Huddleston	Sir Giles Alington
1554 (Nov)	Sir John Huddleston	Sir John Cotton
1555	Roger North, 2nd Baron North	Thomas Wendy
1558	Sir Giles Alington	Robert Peyton
1559 (Jan)	Roger North	Francis Hynde
1562–1563	Roger North, ennobled and repl. 1566 by Robert Peyton	John Hutton
1571	John Hutton	Henry Long
1572 (Apr)	Francis Hynde	John Hutton
1584 (Nov)	John North	Sir John Cutts
1586 (Oct)	John North	Sir John Cutts
1588 (Oct)	John North	(Sir) Francis Hynde
1593	John Cotton	John Peyton
1597 (Oct)	(Sir) Henry North	William Hynde
1601	Sir John Cutts	(Sir) John Cotton
1604	Sir John Peyton, 1st Baronet	Sir John Cutts
1614	Sir Thomas Chicheley	Sir John Cutts
1621	Sir Edward Peyton, 2nd Baronet	Sir John Cutts
1624	Sir Simon Steward	Sir John Cutts
1625	Sir Edward Peyton, 2nd Baronet	Sir John Cutts
1626	Sir Edward Peyton, 2nd Baronet	Sir John Cutts
1628	Sir Miles Sandys, 1st Baronet	Sir John Carleton, 1st Baronet
1629–1640	No Parliaments convened	

Year	First member	First party	Second member	Second party
Apr 1640	Sir Dudley North		Sir John Cutts	
Nov 1640	Sir Dudley North	Parliamentarian	Thomas Chicheley	Royalist
Chicheley disabled 16 September 1642 replaced 1645 by Francis Russell. North secluded 1648				

Year	First member	Second member	Third member	Fourth member
1653	John Sadler	Thomas French	Robert Castle	Samuel Warner
1654	John Delbrow	Henry Pickering	Robert Castle	Francis Russell
1656	Robert West	Henry Pickering	Robert Castle	Francis Russell
1659	Sir Thomas Willys, 1st Baronet	Sir Henry Pickering		

=== MPs 1660-1832 ===
Year	First member	First party	Second member	Second party
1660	Thomas Wendy		Isaac Thornton	
1661	Thomas Wendy		Thomas Chicheley	
1674	Sir Thomas Hatton, Bt		Thomas Chicheley	
February 1679	Gerard Russell		Edward Partherich	
August 1679	Sir Levinus Bennet, Bt	Tory	Sir Robert Cotton	
1693	The Lord Cutts		Sir Robert Cotton	
1695	The Lord Cutts		Edward Russell	Whig
1697	The Lord Cutts		Sir Rushout Cullen, Bt	
1702	Granado Pigot		Sir Rushout Cullen, Bt	
1705	John Bromley		Sir Rushout Cullen, Bt	
1707	John Bromley		Sir Rushout Cullen, Bt	
1710	John Bromley		John Jenyns	
1717	John Bromley		Robert Clarke	
1718	Francis Whichcote		Robert Clarke	
1722	Sir John Hynde Cotton, Bt		Lord Harley	
1724	Sir John Hynde Cotton, Bt		Samuel Shepheard	
1727	Henry Bromley		Samuel Shepheard	
1741	Soame Jenyns		Samuel Shepheard	
1747	Soame Jenyns		Viscount Royston	Whig
1754	Marquess of Granby		Viscount Royston	Whig
1764	Marquess of Granby		Sir John Hynde Cotton, Bt	
1770	Sir Sampson Gideon, Bt		Sir John Hynde Cotton, Bt	
1780	Lord Robert Manners	Tory	Viscount Royston	Tory
1782	Sir Henry Peyton, Bt	Whig	Viscount Royston	Tory
1789	James Whorwood Adeane	Whig	Viscount Royston	Tory
1790	James Whorwood Adeane	Whig	Charles Philip Yorke	Tory
May 1802	Sir Henry Peyton, Bt	Whig	Charles Philip Yorke	Tory
July 1802	Lord Charles Manners	Tory	Charles Philip Yorke	Tory
1810	Lord Charles Manners	Tory	Lord Francis Osborne	Whig
1830	Henry John Adeane	Whig	Lord Francis Osborne	Whig
1831	Henry John Adeane	Whig	Richard Greaves Townley	Whig
1832	third member added			

=== MPs 1832–1885 ===
Election	First member	First party	Second member	Second party	Third member	Third party
1832	Richard Greaves Townley	Whig	Charles Yorke	Tory	John Walbanke-Childers	Whig
1834	Richard Greaves Townley	Whig	Charles Yorke	Conservative	John Walbanke-Childers	Whig
1835	Richard Greaves Townley	Whig	Eliot Yorke	Conservative	Richard Jefferson Eaton	Conservative
1841	John Peter Allix	Conservative	Eliot Yorke	Conservative	Richard Jefferson Eaton	Conservative
1847	Richard Greaves Townley	Whig	Eliot Yorke	Conservative	Lord George Manners	Conservative
1852	Edward Ball	Conservative	Eliot Yorke	Conservative	Lord George Manners	Conservative
1857	Edward Ball	Conservative	Eliot Yorke	Conservative	Henry John Adeane	Whig
1859	Edward Ball	Conservative	Eliot Yorke	Conservative	Henry John Adeane	Liberal
1863 by-election	Lord George Manners	Conservative	Eliot Yorke	Conservative	Henry John Adeane	Liberal
1865	Lord George Manners	Conservative	Viscount Royston	Conservative	Richard Young	Liberal
1868	Lord George Manners	Conservative	Viscount Royston	Conservative	Hon. Sir Henry Brand	Liberal
January 1874 by-election	Lord George Manners	Conservative	Hon. Eliot Yorke	Conservative	Hon. Sir Henry Brand	Liberal
October 1874 by-election	Benjamin Rodwell	Conservative	Hon. Eliot Yorke	Conservative	Hon. Sir Henry Brand	Liberal
1879 by-election	Benjamin Rodwell	Conservative	Edward Hicks	Conservative	Hon. Sir Henry Brand	Liberal
1881 by-election	James Redfoord Bulwer	Conservative	Edward Hicks	Conservative	Hon. Sir Henry Brand	Liberal
1884 by-election	James Redfoord Bulwer	Conservative	Edward Hicks	Conservative	Arthur Thornhill	Conservative
1885	Constituency abolished, Chesterton, Newmarket and Wisbech from 1885					

=== MPs 1918-1983 ===
Election	Member	Party
Chesterton and Newmarket prior to 1918
1918	Edwin Montagu	Coalition Liberal
1922	Edwin Montagu	National Liberal
1922	Harold Gray	Conservative
1923	Richard Briscoe	Conservative
1945	A. E. Stubbs	Labour
1950	Gerald Howard	Conservative
1961 by-election	Francis Pym	Conservative
1983	Constituency abolished, SE Cambs and SW Cambs from 1983	

== Elections ==
=== Elections in the 1970s ===
General election 1979: Cambridgeshire
Party	Candidate	Votes	%	±%
Conservative	Francis Pym	41,218	56.5	+9.0
Labour	R Collins	17,929	24.6	−3.2
Liberal	Stephen Ronald Jakobi	13,780	18.9	−5.8
Majority		23,289	31.9	+12.2
Turnout		72,927	78.3	+2.3
Conservative hold		Swing	+6.1	

General election October 1974: Cambridgeshire
Party	Candidate	Votes	%	±%
Conservative	Francis Pym	30,508	47.5	+0.4
Labour	Michael Peter Farley	17,853	27.8	+2.0
Liberal	Stephen Ronald Jakobi	15,841	24.7	−2.4
Majority		12,655	19.7	−0.3
Turnout		64,202	76.0	−6.8
Conservative hold		Swing	−0.8	

General election February 1974: Cambridgeshire
Party	Candidate	Votes	%	±%
Conservative	Francis Pym	32,638	47.1	−7.5
Liberal	Stephen Ronald Jakobi	18,826	27.1	+15.5
Labour	Michael Peter Farley	17,930	25.8	−8.0
Majority		13,812	20.0	−0.8
Turnout		69,394	82.8	+7.3
Conservative hold		Swing	−11.5	

General election 1970: Cambridgeshire
Party	Candidate	Votes	%	±%
Conservative	Francis Pym	32,264	54.6	+6.9
Labour	John Noel Hughes	19,993	33.8	−4.2
Liberal	Morag Brown	6,861	11.6	−2.7
Majority		12,271	20.8	+11.1
Turnout		59,118	75.5	−3.7
Conservative hold		Swing	+5.5	

=== Elections in the 1960s ===
General election 1966: Cambridgeshire
Party	Candidate	Votes	%	±%
Conservative	Francis Pym	25,600	47.7	−0.3
Labour	John Noel Hughes	20,433	38.0	+4.0
Liberal	John Roderic Charles Beale	7,698	14.3	−3.7
Majority		5,167	9.7	−4.3
Turnout		53,731	79.2	−0.6
Conservative hold		Swing	−2.4	

General election 1964: Cambridgeshire
Party	Candidate	Votes	%	±%
Conservative	Francis Pym	24,883	48.0	−9.9
Labour	Evan Rutherford	17,636	34.0	−8.1
Liberal	Richard Moore	9,347	18.0	N/A
Majority		7,247	14.0	−1.8
Turnout		51,866	79.8	+1.8
Conservative hold		Swing	−0.9	

1961 Cambridgeshire by-election
Party	Candidate	Votes	%	±%
Conservative	Francis Pym	17,643	45.9	−12.0
Labour	Robert Davies	11,566	30.1	−12.0
Liberal	Richard Moore	9,219	24.0	New
Majority		6,077	15.8	0.0
Turnout		38,428	62.4	−15.6
Conservative hold		Swing	0.0	

=== Elections in the 1950s ===
General election 1959: Cambridgeshire
Party	Candidate	Votes	%	±%
Conservative	Gerald Howard	27,407	57.9	+3.6
Labour	William Royle	19,928	42.1	−3.6
Majority		7,479	15.8	+7.2
Turnout		47,335	78.0	−0.9
Conservative hold		Swing	+3.6	

General election 1955: Cambridgeshire
Party	Candidate	Votes	%	±%
Conservative	Gerald Howard	25,025	54.3	+0.5
Labour	Henry Walston	21,051	45.7	−0.5
Majority		3,974	8.6	+1.0
Turnout		46,076	78.9	−2.3
Conservative hold		Swing	+0.5	

General election 1951: Cambridgeshire
Party	Candidate	Votes	%	±%
Conservative	Gerald Howard	25,095	53.8	+7.5
Labour	Henry Walston	21,558	46.2	+5.9
Majority		3,537	7.6	+1.6
Turnout		46,653	81.2	−2.2
Conservative hold		Swing	+0.8	

General election 1950: Cambridgeshire
Party	Candidate	Votes	%	±%
Conservative	Gerald Howard	21,846	46.3	+4.1
Labour	A. E. Stubbs	19,046	40.3	−2.0
Liberal	Richard Thomas Howlett	6,348	13.4	−2.1
Majority		2,800	6.0	N/A
Turnout		47,240	83.4	+13.5
Conservative gain from Labour		Swing	+3.1	

=== Elections in the 1940s ===
General election 1945: Cambridgeshire
Party	Candidate	Votes	%	±%
Labour	A. E. Stubbs	18,714	42.3	+10.3
Conservative	Gerald Howard	18,670	42.2	−11.2
Liberal	Lionel Edward Goodman	6,867	15.5	+0.9
Majority		44	0.1	N/A
Turnout		44,251	69.9	+2.1
Labour gain from Conservative		Swing	+10.8	

=== Elections in the 1930s ===
General election 1935: Cambridgeshire
Party	Candidate	Votes	%	±%
Conservative	Richard Briscoe	19,087	53.4	−14.9
Labour	John Bellerby	11,437	32.0	+0.3
Liberal	John William Payne	5,223	14.6	New
Majority		7,650	21.4	−15.2
Turnout		35,747	67.8	−2.7
Conservative hold		Swing	−7.6	

General election 1931: Cambridgeshire
Party	Candidate	Votes	%	±%
Conservative	Richard Briscoe	23,742	68.3	+30.7
Labour	Geoffrey Garratt	11,013	31.7	0.0
Majority		12,729	36.6	+30.7
Turnout		34,755	70.5	−4.2
Conservative hold		Swing	+30.7	

=== Elections in the 1920s ===
General election 1929: Cambridgeshire
Party	Candidate	Votes	%	±%
Conservative	Richard Briscoe	13,306	37.6	−21.4
Labour	Geoffrey Garratt	11,256	31.7	−9.3
Liberal	John William Payne	10,904	30.7	New
Majority		2,050	5.9	−12.1
Turnout		35,466	74.7	+4.8
Conservative hold		Swing	−6.1	

General election 1924: Cambridgeshire
Party	Candidate	Votes	%	±%
Conservative	Richard Briscoe	15,530	59.0	+15.4
Labour	Geoffrey Garratt	10,781	41.0	+9.2
Majority		4,749	18.0	+6.2
Turnout		26,311	69.9	−2.6
Conservative hold		Swing	+3.1	

General election 1923: Cambridgeshire
Party	Candidate	Votes	%	±%
Conservative	Richard Briscoe	11,710	43.6	+5.6
Labour	A. E. Stubbs	8,554	31.8	−3.5
Liberal	Elsbeth Dimsdale	6,619	24.6	−2.1
Majority		3,156	11.8	+9.1
Turnout		26,883	72.5	+1.7
Unionist hold		Swing	+4.6	

General election 1922: Cambridgeshire
Party	Candidate	Votes	%	±%
Conservative	Harold Gray	9,846	38.0	N/A
Labour	A. E. Stubbs	9,167	35.3	+0.4
National Liberal	Edwin Montagu	6,942	26.7	−38.4
Majority		679	2.7	N/A
Turnout		25,955	70.8	+19.5
Conservative gain from National Liberal		Swing	+38.2	

=== Elections in the 1910s ===
General election 1918: Cambridgeshire
Party		Candidate	Votes	%
C	Coalition Liberal	Edwin Montagu	12,497	65.1
	Independent Labour	A. E. Stubbs	6,686	34.9
Majority			5,811	30.2
Turnout			19,183	51.3
	National Liberal win (new seat)			
C indicates candidate endorsed by the coalition government.

=== Elections in the 1880s ===
By-election, 21 Mar 1884: Cambridgeshire (1 seat)
Party	Candidate	Votes	%	±%
Conservative	Arthur Thornhill	3,915	58.2	N/A
Liberal	Thomas Coote	2,812	41.8	N/A
Majority		1,103	16.4	N/A
Turnout		6,727	67.2	N/A
Registered electors		10,003		
Conservative gain from Speaker				

- Caused by Brand's elevation to the peerage, becoming Viscount Hampden.

By-election, 7 Sep 1881: Cambridgeshire (1 seat)
Party	Candidate	Votes	%	±%
Conservative	James Redfoord Bulwer	Unopposed		
Conservative hold				

- Caused by Rodwell's resignation.

General election 1880: Cambridgeshire (3 seats)
Party	Candidate	Votes	%	±%
Speaker (Liberal)	Henry Brand	Unopposed		
Conservative	Edward Hicks	Unopposed		
Conservative	Benjamin Rodwell	Unopposed		
Registered electors		10,023		
Speaker hold				
Conservative hold				
Conservative hold				

=== Elections in the 1870s ===
By-election, 30 Jan 1879: Cambridgeshire (1 seat)
Party	Candidate	Votes	%	±%
Conservative	Edward Hicks	Unopposed		
Conservative hold				

- Caused by Yorke's death.

By-election, 5 Oct 1874: Cambridgeshire (1 seat)
Party	Candidate	Votes	%	±%
Conservative	Benjamin Rodwell	Unopposed		
Conservative hold				

- Caused by Manners' death.

General election 1874: Cambridgeshire (3 seats)
Party	Candidate	Votes	%	±%
Speaker (Liberal)	Henry Brand	Unopposed		
Conservative	George Manners	Unopposed		
Conservative	Elliot Yorke	Unopposed		
Registered electors		10,104		
Speaker hold				
Conservative hold				
Conservative hold				

By-election, 3 January 1874: Cambridgeshire (1 seat)
Party	Candidate	Votes	%	±%
Conservative	Elliot Yorke	Unopposed		
Conservative hold				

- Caused by Yorke's succession to the peerage, becoming Earl of Hardwicke.

=== Elections in the 1860s ===
General election 1868: Cambridgeshire (3 seats)
Party	Candidate	Votes	%	±%
Conservative	George Manners	3,998	27.6	N/A
Conservative	Charles Yorke	3,874	26.8	N/A
Liberal	Henry Brand	3,300	22.8	N/A
Liberal	Richard Young	3,290	22.7	N/A
Majority		574	4.0	N/A
Turnout		7,231 (est)	76.0 (est)	N/A
Registered electors		9,512		
Conservative hold				
Conservative hold				
Liberal hold				

By-election, 17 Jul 1866: Cambridgeshire
Party	Candidate	Votes	%	±%
Conservative	Charles Yorke	Unopposed		
Conservative hold				

- Caused by Yorke's appointment as Comptroller of the Household.

General election 1865: Cambridgeshire (3 seats)
Party	Candidate	Votes	%	±%
Conservative	George Manners	Unopposed		
Conservative	Charles Yorke	Unopposed		
Liberal	Richard Young	Unopposed		
Registered electors		7,060		
Conservative hold				
Conservative hold				
Liberal hold				

By-election, 14 Feb 1863: Cambridgeshire
Party	Candidate	Votes	%	±%
Conservative	George Manners	Unopposed		
Conservative hold				

- Caused by Ball's resignation.

=== Elections in the 1850s ===
General election 1859: Cambridgeshire (3 seats)
Party	Candidate	Votes	%	±%
Conservative	Edward Ball	Unopposed		
Conservative	Eliot Yorke	Unopposed		
Liberal	Henry John Adeane	Unopposed		
Registered electors		7,157		
Conservative hold				
Conservative hold				
Liberal hold				

General election 1857: Cambridgeshire (3 seats)
Party	Candidate	Votes	%	±%
Conservative	Edward Ball	2,780	27.8	N/A
Whig	Henry John Adeane	2,616	26.1	New
Conservative	Eliot Yorke	2,483	24.8	N/A
Conservative	George Manners	2,127	21.3	N/A
Turnout		5,079 (est)	80.6 (est)	N/A
Registered electors		6,298		
Majority		164	1.7	N/A
Conservative hold		Swing	N/A	
Majority		489	4.8	N/A
Whig gain from Conservative		Swing	N/A	
Conservative hold		Swing	N/A	

General election 1852: Cambridgeshire (3 seats)
Party	Candidate	Votes	%	±%
Conservative	Edward Ball	Unopposed		
Conservative	Eliot Yorke	Unopposed		
Conservative	George Manners	Unopposed		
Registered electors		6,989		
Conservative hold				
Conservative hold				
Conservative gain from Whig				

=== Elections in the 1840s ===
General election 1847: Cambridgeshire (3 seats)
Party	Candidate	Votes	%	±%
Conservative	George Manners	Unopposed		
Conservative	Eliot Yorke	Unopposed		
Whig	Richard Greaves Townley	Unopposed		
Registered electors		7,175		
Conservative hold				
Conservative hold				
Whig gain from Conservative				

General election 1841: Cambridgeshire (3 seats)
Party	Candidate	Votes	%	±%
Conservative	Richard Jefferson Eaton	Unopposed		
Conservative	Eliot Yorke	Unopposed		
Conservative	John Peter Allix	Unopposed		
Registered electors		7,400		
Conservative hold				
Conservative hold				
Conservative gain from Whig				

=== Elections in the 1830s ===
General election 1837: Cambridgeshire (3 seats)
Party	Candidate	Votes	%
Conservative	Eliot Yorke	Unopposed	
Conservative	Richard Jefferson Eaton	Unopposed	
Whig	Richard Greaves Townley	Unopposed	
Registered electors		7,100	
Conservative hold			
Conservative hold			
Whig hold			

General election 1835: Cambridgeshire (3 seats)
Party	Candidate	Votes	%	±%
Conservative	Eliot Yorke	3,871	29.4	+14.8
Conservative	Richard Jefferson Eaton	3,261	24.7	+10.1
Whig	Richard Greaves Townley	3,070	23.3	−12.1
Whig	John Walbanke-Childers	2,979	22.6	−12.8
Turnout		6,469	96.4	+4.4
Registered electors		6,710		
Majority		191	1.4	−2.1
Conservative hold		Swing	+13.6	
Conservative gain from Whig		Swing	+11.3	
Majority		91	0.7	+0.6
Whig hold		Swing	−12.3	

General election 1832: Cambridgeshire (3 seats)
Party	Candidate	Votes	%
Tory	Charles Yorke	3,693	29.2
Whig	Richard Greaves Townley	3,261	25.7
Whig	John Walbanke-Childers	2,862	22.6
Whig	Henry John Adeane	2,850	22.5
Turnout		5,923	92.0
Registered electors		6,435	
Majority		432	3.5
Tory win (new seat)			
Majority		12	0.1
Whig hold			
Whig hold			

By-election, 1 November 1831: Cambridgeshire
Party	Candidate	Votes	%
Whig	Richard Greaves Townley	1,981	57.8
Tory	Charles Yorke	1,445	42.2
Majority		536	15.6
Turnout		3,426	c. 85.7
Registered electors		c. 4,000	
Whig hold			

- Caused by Osborne's resignation

General election 1831: Cambridgeshire (2 seats)
Party	Candidate	Votes	%
Whig	Francis Osborne	Unopposed	
Whig	Henry John Adeane	Unopposed	
Registered electors		c. 4,000	
Whig hold			
Whig hold			

General election 1830: Cambridgeshire (2 seats)
Party	Candidate	Votes	%	±%
Whig	Francis Osborne	2,339	37.8	
Whig	Henry John Adeane	2,086	33.7	
Tory	Charles Manners	1,757	28.4	
Majority		329	5.3	
Turnout		3,717	c. 92.9	
Registered electors		c. 4,000		
Whig hold		Swing		
Whig gain from Tory		Swing		

== See also ==
- Parliamentary representation from Cambridgeshire
- List of former United Kingdom Parliament constituencies
- Unreformed House of Commons

Parliament of the United Kingdom
Preceded by Nottinghamshire North	Constituency represented by the speaker 1872–1884	Succeeded by Warwick
