= Henry Brand, 1st Viscount Hampden =

British politician (1814–1892)

The Right Honourable The Viscount Hampden GCB PC
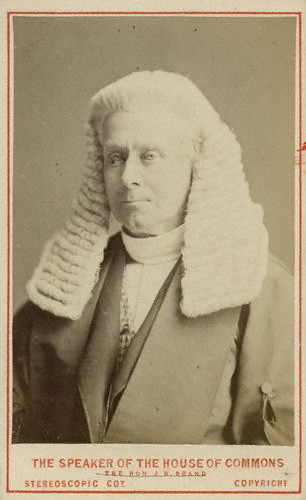
- Brand, c. 1872

Speaker of the House of Commons of the United Kingdom
- In office 9 February 1872 – 26 February 1884
- Monarch: Victoria
- Prime Minister: William Ewart Gladstone; Benjamin Disraeli; William Ewart Gladstone
- Preceded by: Sir Evelyn Denison
- Succeeded by: Sir Arthur Peel

Personal details
- Born: 24 December 1814
- Died: 14 March 1892 (aged 77) Pau, France
- Party: Liberal
- Spouse: Eliza Ellice (1818-1899)
- Children: 10
- Parent: Henry Trevor (father)
- Relatives: Henry Brand (son); Arthur Brand (son); Freeman Thomas (son-in-law); Freeman Freeman-Thomas (grandson); Henry Parkman Sturgis (son-in-law); General Sir Charles Ellice (father-in-law)
- Education: Eton College
- Military career
- Allegiance: United Kingdom
- Branch: British Army
- Service years: 1832-1844
- Units: Coldstream Guards

Henry Bouverie William Brand, 1st Viscount Hampden GCB PC (24 December 1814 – 14 March 1892), was a British Liberal politician. He served as Speaker of the House of Commons from 1872 to 1884.

== Background and education ==
Brand was the second son of General Henry Trevor, 21st Baron Dacre, who inherited the barony in 1851, second son of Thomas Brand and Gertrude Roper, 19th Baroness Dacre. His mother was Pyne, daughter of the Very Reverend the Hon. Maurice Crosbie, Dean of Limerick, son of the 1st Lord Brandon (Brandon's wife was a granddaughter of Sir William Petty, FRS). He descended, almost directly, from Colonel John Hampden, "the Patriot"; his forebear, Sir John Trevor III (1624–72) of Plas Teg, son of Sir John Trevor II of Plas Teg and Trevalun, by Anne daughter of Sir Edmund Hampden of Wendover, had married John Hampden's daughter Ruth, who was his first cousin. That is to say the 19th Baron Dacre (aka Gertrude Roper (d.1819) wife to Thomas Brand V (1749–94)) was the great-great-granddaughter of The Patriot.

He was educated at Eton and was a member of Brook's, Reform and Athenaeum clubs. Brand was in the Coldstream Guards for 12 years, from 20 April 1832 until 6 September 1844. He was their 963rd officer. His father, the General, had been their 690th officer serving 28 years between 1793 and 1821.

== Political career ==
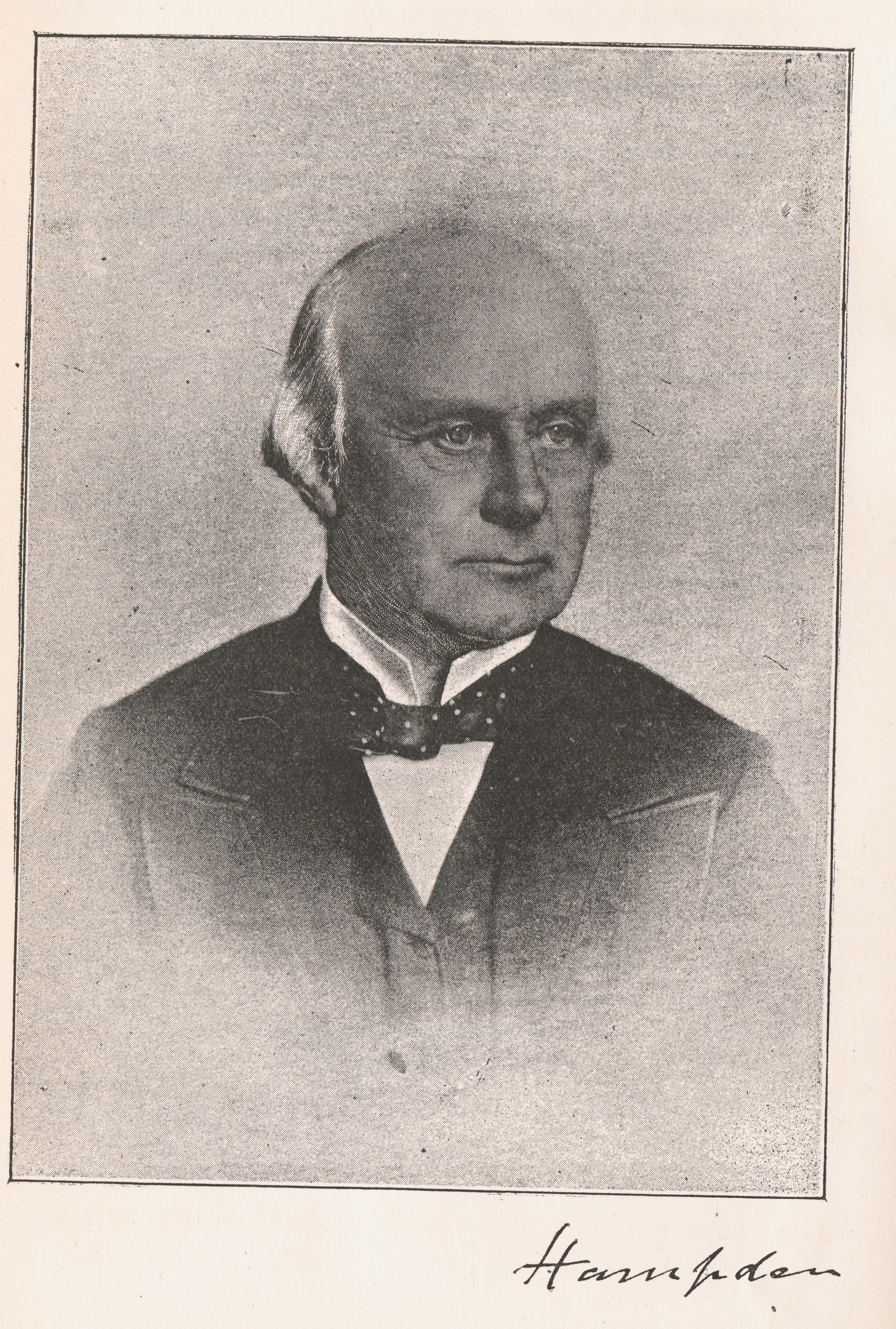
Hampden's autograph and photograph published by George Potter in 1891.

Brand entered parliament as MP for Lewes as a Liberal in 1852, then returned as one of the three members for Cambridgeshire in 1868 (displacing colleague Richard Young (MP) of Wisbech, and for some time was Chief Whip of his party. He was a Lord of the Treasury during the first Palmerston ministry, and Parliamentary Secretary to the Treasury during the second. At some point, he was Keeper of the Privy Seal to the Prince of Wales. In 1872 he was elected Speaker of the House of Commons, and retained this post till February 1884. It fell to him to deal with the systematic obstruction of the Irish Nationalist Party, and his speakership is memorable for his action on 2 February 1881 in refusing further debate on W. E. Forster's Coercion Bill—a step which led to the formal introduction of the closure into parliamentary procedure. He was appointed a GCB in 1881 and on his retirement he was created Viscount Hampden, of Glynde in the County of Sussex. In 1890 he also succeeded in the barony of Dacre on the death of his brother.

== Estates ==
According to John Bateman, who derived his information from statistics published in 1873, Hon. Sir Henry Bouverie William Brand, G.C.B., of Glynde, Lewes, had 8,846 acres in Sussex (worth 8,121 guineas per annum).

== Personal life ==
On 16 April 1838, Lord Hampden married Eliza Ellice (1818–1899), daughter of General Robert Ellice by his wife Eliza Courtney (an illegitimate daughter of Charles Grey, 2nd Earl Grey by Georgiana, Duchess of Devonshire). Together, they had five sons and five daughters:

- Hon. Alice Brand (1840–1925), who married Sir Henry Thomas Farquhar, 4th Bt., son of Sir Walter Farquhar, 3rd Baronet, in 1862. They had four children.
- Henry Brand, 2nd Viscount Hampden (1841–1906), who married Victoria Van de Weyer in 1864. He remarried Susan Henrietta Cavendish in 1868. They had nine children.
- Hon. Gertrude Brand (1844–1927), who married Col. William Henry Campion in 1869. They had eight children.
- Hon. Mabel Brand (1845–1924), who married Freeman Frederick Thomas in 1863. They had four children including Freeman Freeman-Thomas, 1st Marquess of Willingdon.
- Hon. Thomas Seymour Brand (1847–1916), a Rear-Admiral who married Annie Blanche Gaskell, daughter of Henry Lomax Gaskell, in 1879. They had two children.
- Hon. Mary Cecilia Brand (1851–1886) she married Henry Parkman Sturgis in 1872. They had six children.
- Hon. Arthur Brand (1853–1917), who married Edith Ingram, daughter of Joseph Ingram, in 1886. They had one son.
- Hon. Charles Brand (1855–1912), a Major who married Alice Sturgis Van de Weyer in 1878. They had four children.
- Hon. Maud Brand (1856–1944), who married David Augustus Bevan, son of Richard Lee Bevan, in 1885. They had four children.
- Richard Brand (1857–1858), who died young.

Lord Hampden died on 14 March 1892, aged 77 and Lady Hampden died at Pelham House, Lewes in March 1899.

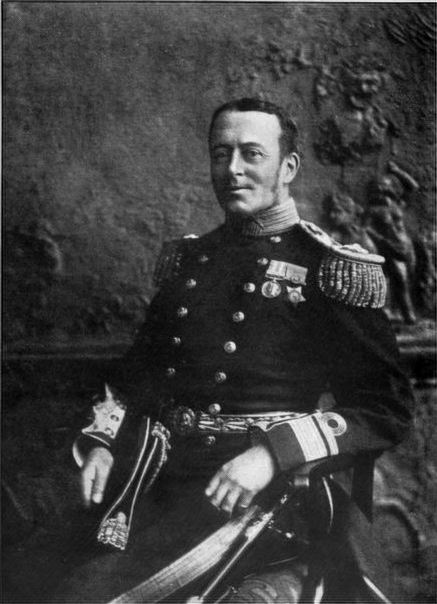
Second son: Rear-Admiral Hon. Thomas Seymour Brand (1847-1916), of Glynde Place.

Fourth son : Hon. Charles Brand (1855-1912).

== Arms ==
Coat of arms of Henry Brand, 1st Viscount Hampden
Crest Out of a Crown Vallary Or a Leopard's Head Argent semée of Escallops and gorged with a Collar Gemel Gules Escutcheon Azure two Swords in saltire points upwards Argent pommelled and hilted Or between three Escallops one in chief and two in fess Or Supporters Dexter: a Wolf Argent gorged with a radiated collar with Line reflexed over the back Or; Sinister: a Bull Gules armed unguled ducally gorged and line reflexed over the back Or Motto Pour bien desirer (Wishing well)

Parliament of the United Kingdom
Preceded by Robert Perfect; Henry Fitzroy	Member of Parliament for Lewes; 1852–1868; With: Henry Fitzroy 1852–1860; John Blencowe 1860–1865; Lord Pelham 1865–1868	Succeeded by Lord Pelham
Preceded by Richard Young; Lord George Manners; Viscount Royston	Member of Parliament for Cambridgeshire; 1868–1884; With: Viscount Royston 1868–1874; Lord George Manners 1868–1874; Elliot Yorke 1874–1879; Benjamin Rodwell 1874–1881; Edward Hicks 1879–1884; James Redfoord Bulwer 1881–1884	Succeeded by Arthur Thornhill; James Redfoord Bulwer; Edward Hicks
Political offices
Preceded by Sir William Jolliffe, Bt	Parliamentary Secretary to the Treasury; 1859–1866	Succeeded by Thomas Edward Taylor
Preceded by Evelyn Denison	Speaker of the House of Commons of the United Kingdom; 1872–1884	Succeeded by Arthur Wellesley Peel
Honorary titles
Preceded by The Earl of Chichester	Lord Lieutenant of Sussex; 1886–1892	Succeeded by The Marquess of Abergavenny
Peerage of the United Kingdom
New creation	Viscount Hampden; 2nd creation 1884–1892	Succeeded by Henry Robert Brand
Peerage of England
Preceded by Thomas Trevor	Baron Dacre; 1st creation 1890–1892	Succeeded by Henry Robert Brand
