= Simon Burgh =

14th-century English politician

Simon Burgh (died c. 1395), of Wimpole, Cambridgeshire, was an English politician.

He was a member (MP) of the parliament of England for Cambridgeshire in 1381, May 1382, January 1390, November 1390 and 1391.
