= James Redfoord Bulwer =

James Bulwer QC JP
Personal information
- Full name: James Benjamin Redfoord Bulwer
- Born: 22 May 1820; Dublin, Ireland
- Died: 4 March 1899 (aged 78); Temple, London
- Source: Cricinfo, 11 April 2017

James Benjamin Redfoord Bulwer (22 May 1820 – 4 March 1899) was an English lawyer, cricketer and a Member of the British Parliament.

== Life ==
Bulwer was born in Dublin. He was educated at King's College London and Trinity College, Cambridge, where he graduated BA in 1842 and MA in 1845. He was admitted to the Inner Temple in 1842 and was made a Queen's Counsel in 1865, becoming a bencher that same year. From 1861 to 1866 he was recorder for Ipswich and then subsequently for Cambridge until 1898. He was a Master in Lunacy from 1886 until his death.

Bulwer was elected to represent Ipswich in the Conservative interest during the period of the Disraeli government from 1874 to 1880, and then for Cambridgeshire from 1881 to 1885.

He was also a cricketer, and played seven first-class matches for Cambridge University Cricket Club and the Marylebone Cricket Club between 1841 and 1845.

Parliament of the United Kingdom
Preceded by Henry Wyndham West and Sir Hugh Adair, Bt.	Member of Parliament for Ipswich; 1874–1880; With: John Cobbold; Thomas Cobbold from 1876	Succeeded by Thomas Cobbold and Jesse Collings
Preceded by Benjamin Rodwell and Sir Henry Brand and Edward Hicks	Member of Parliament for Cambridgeshire; 1881–1885; With: Edward Hicks; Sir Henry Brand to 1884; Arthur Thornhill from 1884	Constituency abolished
