= John Brunne =

English politician

Personal details
- Died: 1405
- Occupation: politician

John Brunne or Brun (died c. 1405), of Willingham, Cambridgeshire, was an English politician. He was a member (MP) of the parliament of England for Cambridgeshire in January 1404.
