= John Burgoyne (MP for Cambridgeshire) =

15th-century English politician

John Burgoyne (died c. 1435), of Dry Drayton, Cambridgeshire, was an English politician.

== Family ==
Burgoyne married and had one daughter and five sons, including the MP, Thomas Burgoyne.

== Career ==
He was a member (MP) of the parliament of England for Cambridgeshire in May 1413, 1419, December 1421 and 1433.
