= William Rodwell =

English cricketer and barrister

Personal information
- Full name: William Hunter Rodwell
- Born: 18 April 1850; Marylebone, Middlesex, England
- Died: 3 August 1929 (aged 79); Amersham, Buckinghamshire, England
- Batting: Unknown
- Relatives: Harold Ruggles-Brise (brother-in-law)

Domestic team information
- Years: Team
- 1882: Marylebone Cricket Club

Career statistics
Competition	First-class
Matches	1
Runs scored	32
Batting average	16.00
100s/50s	–/–
Top score	31
Catches/stumpings	1/–
- Source: Cricinfo, 22 June 2021

William Hunter Rodwell JP (18 April 1850 – 3 August 1929) was an English first-class cricketer and barrister.

The son of the politician and lawyer Benjamin Rodwell, he was born at Marylebone in April 1850. He was educated at Harrow School, before going up to Trinity College, Cambridge. Rodwell served in the West Suffolk Yeomanry, being commissioned as a cornet in November 1868, before being promoted to lieutenant in January 1870. Four years later he was promoted to captain in July 1874. A student of the Middle Temple in May 1872, Rodwell was called to the bar to practice as a barrister in April 1875. A year after he was called to the bar, Rodwell resigned his commission with the West Suffolk Yeomanry. He played first-class cricket for the Marylebone Cricket Club (MCC) in 1882, making a single appearance against Somerset. He batted twice in the match, scoring 1 run in the MCC first innings before being dismissed by Herbert Fowler, while in their second innings he was dismissed for 31 runs by Charles Winter. Rodwell returned to the Suffolk Yeomanry in December 1880 holding the rank of captain, but resigned his commission again in May 1892, at which point he was granted the honorary rank of major. He was additionally a justice of the peace for Suffolk. Rodwell died at Amersham in August 1929.
