= Nicholas Huish =

English politician

Nicholas Huish (fl. 1415), of Balsham, Cambridgeshire and Stansted Mountfitchet, Essex, was an English politician.

== Family ==
Huish was married and had one daughter.

== Career ==
He was a member (MP) of the parliament of England for Cambridgeshire in 1415. He was a lawyer with clients across Essex, Cambridge, and Somerset.
