= Nicholas Caldecote =

English politician

Nicholas Caldecote (died 1443), of Meldreth, Cambridgeshire, was an English politician.

== Family ==
Caldecote had three sons by his wife, Joan.

== Career ==
He was a member (MP) of the parliament of England for Cambridgeshire in 1420, 1426, and 1431.
