= William Freville =

English politician

William Freville (c. 1396 – 1460), of Little Shelford, Cambridgeshire, was an English politician.

He was a member (MP) of the parliament of England for Cambridgeshire in May 1421.
