= Benjamin Rodwell =

British lawyer and politician

Benjamin Bridges Hunter Rodwell QC (17 January 1815 – 6 February 1892) was a British lawyer and Conservative politician who sat in the House of Commons from 1874 to 1881.

Rodwell was the son of William Rodwell, an Ipswich banker, and his wife Elizabeth Anne Hunter, daughter of Benjamin Hunter of Glencarse, Perthshire. Benjamin Rodwell was educated at Charterhouse School and Trinity College, Cambridge, before being admitted at Inner Temple and called to the bar at Middle Temple in 1840. He served on the South-Eastern Circuit. In 1858, he became a Queen's Counsel and Bencher of his Inn. He was a J.P. and Deputy Lieutenant of Suffolk and Chairman of the quarter sessions.

Rodwell was elected as a Member of Parliament for Cambridgeshire in 1874, was reelected in 1879 and resigned in 1881. He was married to Mary Packer Boggis, daughter of James Boggis, in 1844. Rodwell died at his residence, Woodlands, in Holbrook, at the age of 77. His son, William, was a cricketer and barrister.

Parliament of the United Kingdom
Preceded by Lord George Manners; Sir Henry Brand; Eliot Constantine Yorke	Member of Parliament for Cambridgeshire; 1874–1881; With: Sir Henry Brand 1874–1881; Eliot Constantine Yorke 1874–1879; Edward Hicks	Succeeded by Sir Henry Brand; Edward Hicks; James Redfoord Bulwer
