= 1961 Cambridgeshire by-election =

UK Parliamentary by-election

The 1961 Cambridgeshire by-election was held on 16 March 1961. The by-election was triggered by the appointment of the incumbent Conservative, Gerald Howard, as a High Court Judge on the Queen's Bench Division. It was won by the Conservative candidate Francis Pym.

== Candidates ==
- The local Liberal association selected Richard Gillachrist Moore, a former journalist on the News Chronicle. He was born on 20 February 1931. He was a son of Sir Alan Hilary Moore and Hilda Mary Burrows. He was educated at Highfield School, Liphook and Radley College, Berkshire, gaining an exhibition to Trinity College, Cambridge in 1949. In 1955 he was President of Cambridge Union. He was also Chairman of the Union of University Liberal Societies. He was a member of the Liberal Party Council and the executive and the Colonial Affairs committee. He contested Tavistock at the general elections of 1955 and 1959.

== Result ==
Cambridgeshire by-election, 1961
Party	Candidate	Votes	%	±%
Conservative	Francis Pym	17,643	45.9	−12.0
Labour	Robert M D Davies	11,566	30.1	−12.0
Liberal	Richard Moore	9,219	24.0	New
Majority		6,077	15.8	0.0
Turnout		38,428	62.4	−15.6
Conservative hold		Swing	0.0	
