= Henry English =

English politician

Henry English (died 1393), of Wood Ditton, Cambridgeshire, was an English politician.

He was a Member (MP) of the Parliament of England for Cambridgeshire in 1373, October 1377, October 1383, November 1384 and January 1390. He also served as High Sheriff of Cambridgeshire and Huntingdonshire for 1380–81 and 1384–85 and as High Sheriff of Essex and Hertfordshire in 1389 (his wife held land in Essex).

He had married Margaret, the widow of Sir John Waweton of Steeple Bumpstead, Essex, with whom he had 3 daughters.
