= Thomas Lopham =

English politician

Thomas Lopham (died 1416), of Little Carlton, Cambridgeshire, was an English politician.

== Family ==
Lopham was the son and heir of John Lopham of Little Carlton and his wife, Margaret.

== Career ==
He was a member (MP) of the parliament of England for Cambridgeshire in November 1414.
