= John Hobildod =

English politician

John Hobildod (died c. 1421), of Tadlow, Cambridgeshire, was an English politician.

He was a member (MP) of the parliament of England for Cambridgeshire in 1402, 1411 and 1416. He was High Sheriff of Cambridgeshire and Huntingdonshire for 1403–04 and 1407–08.
