= William Porter (died 1436) =

English politician

William Porter (died 1436) of Wimpole, Cambridgeshire, was an English politician.

== Family ==
Porter was the son of Reynold Porter of Rutland. By December 1411, Porter had married Agnes (c. 1387 – 4 March 1461), daughter and coheiress of Sir Adam Francis, MP.

== Career ==
He was a member (MP) of the parliament of England for Cambridgeshire in May 1413.
