= Harold Gray (landowner) =

Sir Harold William Stannus Gray, KBE (16 August 1867 – 23 May 1951) was an Anglo-Irish landowner, horse breeder and politician. He served a brief period as a Member of Parliament during which he pressed for more help for agriculture.

== Family and education ==
Gray's father, Major George Gray, was a Deputy Lieutenant for County Antrim and he was born there at the family estate of Graymount. His father died in 1879 and Gray inherited the estate at that time, although he continued his education. In 1881 he entered Eton College but left after only a year; he went up to Magdalene College, Cambridge, in 1885. After obtaining his degree he returned to Graymount to run the estate. Gray married his cousin, Rowena Stannus, the daughter of a County Antrim Justice of the peace, in 1894.

== Horse breeding ==
Both at his estate in County Antrim and at an estate on the Gog Magog Hills in Cambridgeshire which he bought in 1904, Gray became a very successful breeder of thoroughbred racehorses, running some of them on the English and Irish turf. He also played a part in society, being High Sheriff of County Antrim in 1895. During World War I, Gray and his wife went to France to help in hospitals treating wounded Allied troops, and Gray drove a motor ambulance for the French Red Cross. He also became a Justice of the Peace for County Antrim himself.

== Election to Parliament ==
Gray's English land was in the Cambridgeshire constituency. At the time of the 1922 general election, the MP was Edwin Montagu, who had been Secretary of State for India in the Coalition government. Montagu's policy was unpopular with Conservatives and he had been sacked from his ministerial office in March 1922 after publishing a telegram from the Indian government which was critical of government policy. Montagu stood for re-election as a Liberal without pledging himself to either David Lloyd George or H. H. Asquith. The Conservatives had been expecting to have to support Montagu as a Coalition candidate. At a late stage, the "die-hard" section within the Cambridgeshire Conservatives decided to stand a candidate against Montagu, who would have the backing of the party centrally and Gray was chosen as their candidate at the end of October 1922.

== Agricultural issues ==
In his election address Gray concentrated on farming policy, complaining that the Coalition government had promised farmers support, but had withdrawn it. He supported marking all foreign imported eggs. He also favoured building a large number of homes for affordable rents. The campaign went poorly for the Liberals, who were reported by the last week of the campaign to be "despondent" about Montagu's chances. Gray won the election with a small majority over the Labour candidate, with Montagu in third place. As a Member of Parliament Gray concentrated on agricultural subjects, asking the Minister to introduce legislation to raise the wages of farm labourers. In line with his election pledge he supported the Merchandise Marks Bill introduced by E. G. Pretyman which provided that all imported material must be marked with its country of origin.

== Later life ==
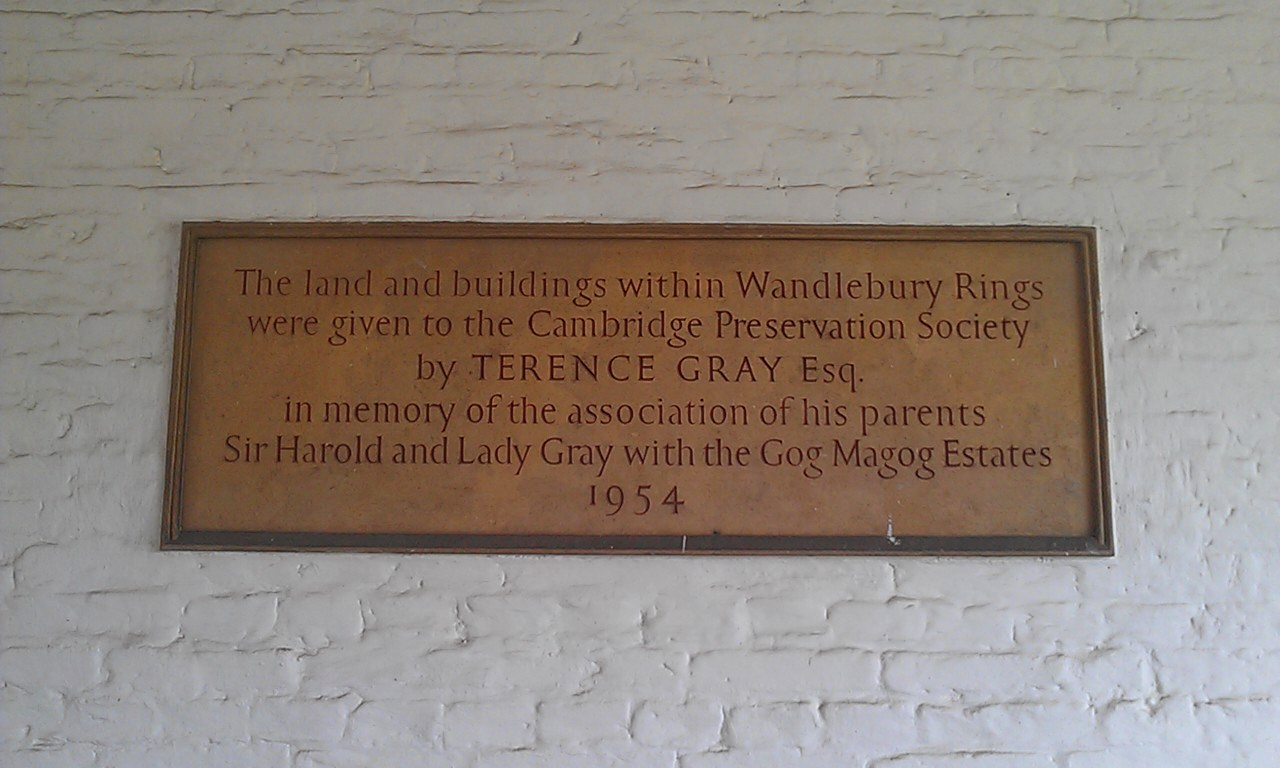
Plaque on Wandlebury stable recording the gift of land by Terence Gray in memory of his parents, 1954

When a new election was called in November 1923, Gray was ill and stood down from Parliament. He renewed his involvement in public life when he recovered, becoming a county councillor in Cambridgeshire and serving as High Sheriff of Cambridgeshire and Huntingdonshire in 1939–40. He was awarded the honour of Knight Commander of the Order of the British Empire "for political and public service in Cambridgeshire" in the 1938 Birthday Honours.

Gray's only son Terence was a theatre producer who became known in later life as the Taoist author Wei Wu Wei.

Parliament of the United Kingdom
Preceded by Edwin Samuel Montagu	Member of Parliament for Cambridgeshire; 1922–1923	Succeeded by Richard Briscoe
