= Arthur Thornhill =

Arthur John Thornhill (3 April 1850 – 4 June 1930) was an English Conservative Party politician from Diddington Hall, Buckden, in Huntingdonshire.

Hicks was elected as a member of parliament (MP) for Cambridgeshire at a by-election in March 1884 following the elevation to the peerage of Henry Brand. He held the seat until the constituency was divided by the Redistribution of Seats Act 1885.

He was nominated as High Sheriff of Cambridgeshire and Huntingdonshire in 1889, and nominated again in 1892 after which he was appointed to the office in 1893.

Parliament of the United Kingdom
Preceded by Henry Brand; Edward Hicks; James Redfoord Bulwer	Member of Parliament for Cambridgeshire; 1884 – 1885; With: James Redfoord Bulwer; Edward Hicks	Constituency divided
