= 1879 Cambridgeshire by-election =

UK Parliamentary by-election

The 1879 Cambridgeshire by-election was fought on 30 January 1879. The by-election was fought due to the death of the incumbent Conservative MP, Elliot Yorke. It was won by the Conservative candidate Edward Hicks, who was unopposed.
