= Gerald Howard =

British politician (1896–1973)

Sir Stephen Gerald Howard (7 June 1896 – 25 June 1973) was a British farmer, barrister and judge who was an active National Liberal and later Conservative Party politician. He had a junior role on the prosecution team in several celebrated trials in the immediate post-war era.

== First World War ==
Howard was the son of Stephen Goodwin Howard, who was Liberal Party Member of Parliament for Sudbury between 1918 and 1922. He was sent to Harrow School, but interrupted his education in 1916 to join the Royal Flying Corps. He became a Flight Lieutenant in the Royal Air Force on its formation in 1918. Later that year he left the RAF to go Balliol College, Oxford where he studied law.

== Criminal law barrister ==
Following his father's political affiliations, Howard was a candidate at the 1922 general election for Eye in Suffolk as a National Liberal with Conservative Party support.

In 1924, Howard was called to the Bar by Lincoln's Inn. He became a criminal law barrister, generally appearing as a junior for the prosecution; he also remained very attached to East Anglia where he farmed on the family estate. While appearing not to have any personal interest in the way the case turned out, he was a skillful advocate and appeared in many high-profile cases.

In November 1936, he was appointed to be third junior counsel for the crown (a crown prosecutor) at the Old Bailey (Central Criminal Court). In December 1942 he was elected a Bencher of Lincoln's Inn.

== Prominent trials ==
Howard was appointed Recorder of Bury St Edmunds (a part-time judicial post) in 1943. He was adopted as Conservative Party candidate for Cambridgeshire in November 1944, but unexpectedly lost the seat in the 1945 general election by 44 votes. Earlier that year, Howard had prosecuted in the "Cleft chin murder trial". Howard was High Sheriff of Cambridgeshire and Huntingdonshire for the year 1945 to 1946, and became a senior Prosecuting Counsel at the end of the year. He was also Recorder of Ipswich from 1947 and Chairman of Quarter Sessions for Cambridgeshire from 1947.

The period between 1945 and 1950 saw Howard's most prominent cases. The week after the election he prosecuted John Amery for treason, and he was also third prosecution counsel at the trial of William Joyce ('Lord Haw Haw') with Attorney General Sir Hartley Shawcross and Sir Lawrence Byrne. He prosecuted other treason trials arising out of the war. He was on the prosecution team for Thomas Ley and Lawrence Smith (the "Chalkpit murder") in 1947, and in 1949 he took part in the trial of John George Haigh, the "Acid Bath murderer".

== Parliamentary career ==
At the 1950 general election, Howard was elected for Cambridgeshire, regaining the seat from Labour. He was made a King's Counsel on election and remained in practice as a prosecutor. In Parliament he remained loyal to the Conservative whip, and in 1952 successfully defended The Times against a charge arising out of advertisements issued during the 1951 general election criticising nationalisation. In 1952 he became Chairman of Quarter Sessions for East and West Suffolk and in 1958 he was made Recorder of Southend.

== Judgeship ==
In January 1961, Howard's name headed a list of new Judges of the High Court of Justice, on the Queen's Bench Division, which vacated his seat in Parliament. He received a knighthood with the appointment, as was traditional. Howard was on the Judicial Bench for ten years before retiring.

Parliament of the United Kingdom
Preceded by Albert Stubbs	Member of Parliament for Cambridgeshire; 1950–1961	Succeeded by Francis Pym
