= Maud Bevan =

Dame Maud Elizabeth Bevan DBE, JP
- Born: Maud Brand; August 18, 1856
- Died: January 8, 1944 (aged 87)
- Organization: British Red Cross
- Known for: President of the Hertfordshire branch of the British Red Cross
- Father: Henry Bouverie William Brand
- Honours: Dame Commander of the British Empire

Dame Maud Elizabeth Bevan DBE, JP (née Brand; 18 August 1856 – 8 January 1944), daughter of Henry Bouverie William Brand, was president of the Hertfordshire branch of Red Cross and set up a number of massage clinics for disabled soldiers and children. She was one of the first Dames Commander of the British Empire.

== Biography ==
Maud Elizabeth Brand was born in 1856 in Glynde, Sussex, her father was Henry Bouverie William Brand, 1st Viscount Hampden of Glynde and 23rd Baron Dacre, her mother was Lady Elizabeth Georgina (Ellice) Brand. She was the couple's fifth daughter. On 22 October 1885, she married David Augustus Bevan.

Between 1910 and 1938, Bevan worked for the Red Cross, spending part of her time there as president of the Hertfordshire branch of the organisation. During the First World War, she acted as a commandant of Royston auxiliary military hospital. After the war she worked in the Red Cross' Massage and Orthopedics scheme, initially implementing massage clinics for disabled soldiers, before moving on centres for orthopedic massage for children. During the 1920s, she spent some time as a magistrate. Brand's husband had died the previous year, in 1937.

Brand was one of the first women to be appointed a Dame Commander of the British Empire (DBE) in the 1918 King's Birthday Honours for her services as "President of the Hertfordshire Branch, British Red Cross".

Brand died on 8 January 1944 at Ponters Letty Green, Hertford. Her funeral took place at Glynde Church, and on 22 January 1944, a memorial service was held for her in St Albans Abbey.
