= William Asenhill =

15th-century English politician

Sir William Asenhill alias Harpeden (died 1443), of Guilden Morden, Cambridgeshire and Walton, Wakefield, Yorkshire, was an English politician.

He was an Usher of the King's chamber by 1404 until 1413 and knighted before May 1416. He was a Member (MP) of the Parliament of England for Cambridgeshire in 1406, October 1416, 1422, 1423, 1425, 1426 and 1429 and was pricked High Sheriff of Cambridgeshire and Huntingdonshire for 1418–19.

== Family ==
He married Joan, the daughter of Sir John Burgh (1328–1393) of Burrough Green, Cambridgeshire. They had one daughter, named Constance, who married Richard Waterton, the son of John Waterton, in 1435.
