= Edward Partherich =

English politician

- Born: c. 1630
- Died: buried 1705
- Occupation: politician
- Known for: (MP) of the Parliament of England

Edward Partherich (c. 1630 – buried 1705), of Littleport, Cambridgeshire, was an English politician.

== Family ==
He was the son of Sir Edward Partherich, also an MP.

== Career ==
He was a member (MP) of the parliament of England for Cambridgeshire in March 1679.
