= John Colville (died 1394) =

English politician

Sir John Colville (c. 1337 – 1394), of Newton, Cambridgeshire and Walsoken, Norfolk, was an English politician.

He was a member (MP) of the parliament of England for Cambridgeshire in January 1377, April 1384, 1385, November 1390 and 1393.
