= Thomas Priour =

English politician

Thomas Priour (died 1412), of Hatfield Broad Oak, Essex and Westley Waterless, Cambridgeshire, was an English politician.

He was a member (MP) of the parliament of England for Cambridgeshire in 1402.
