= Haselden =

Haselden is a surname. Notable people with the surname include:

- William Haselden (1872–1953), English cartoonist and caricaturist
- John Haselden (1943–2020), British footballer and manager
- Ron Haselden (born 1944), British artist
- Frederick Haselden (1849–1934), New Zealand politician
