= Horseheath =

Village in Cambridgeshire, England

Coordinates: 52.100°N 0.352°E

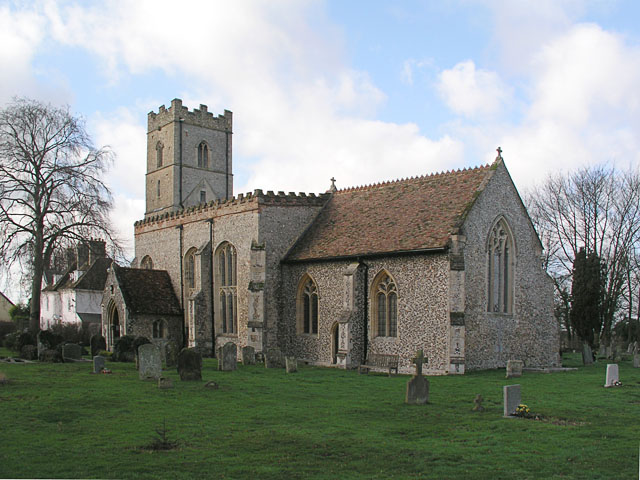
- Horseheath, All Saints

- Location within Cambridgeshire
- OS grid reference: TL600458
- District: South Cambridgeshire
- Shire county: Cambridgeshire
- Region: East
- Country: England
- Sovereign state: United Kingdom
- Post town: CAMBRIDGE
- Postcode district: CB21
- Dialling code: 01223
- Police: Cambridgeshire
- Fire: Cambridgeshire
- Ambulance: East of England
- UK Parliament: Cambridgeshire South East

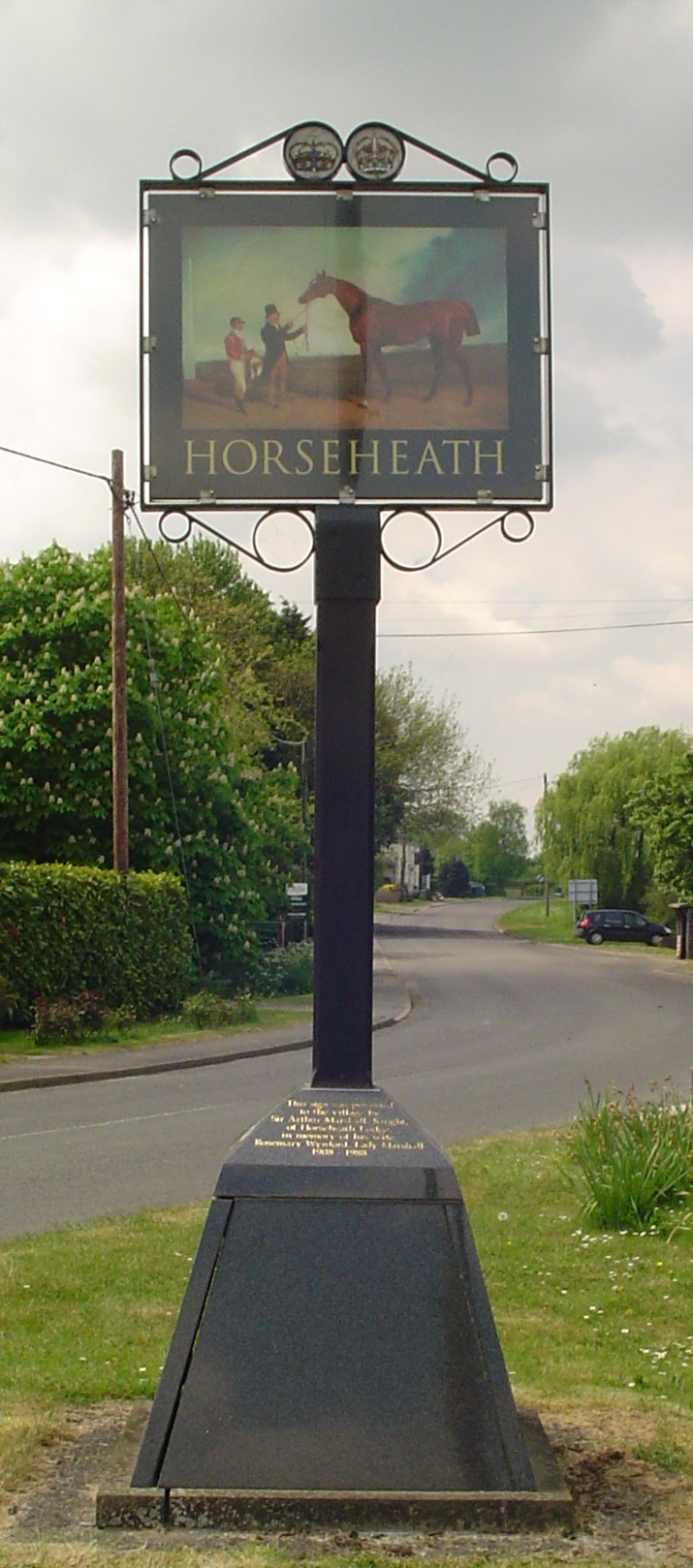
Signpost in Horseheath

Horseheath is a village in Cambridgeshire, England, situated a few miles south-east of Cambridge, between Linton and Haverhill, on the A1307 road. It was known to the Romans, and it had for a while a fine house in a great park, but both are now gone. The population of the village is included in the civil parish of Bartlow.

== Church ==
Its 600-year-old church contains Norman fragments. The fine nave, a blaze of light from great transomed windows, is 15th century, and its lofty height is crowned by a noble roof with a great span, with massive moulded beams and carved bosses. The oak chancel screen also dates from the 15th century and still has traces of painting in its panels. There is a 16th-century sundial. It has a 500-year-old font, and treasured brasses and monuments of lords and ladies of its greater days: the Audleys and the Alingtons. A fragment of old glass in the church has the shield of the Audleys, one of whom distinguished himself in France at the Battle of Poitiers in 1356.

A brass portrait in the church shows William Audley, who was alive at the time, standing with his feet on a lion, magnificent in armour and with a very long sword. William Alington, Treasurer of the Exchequer (d. 1446) also has his tomb in Horseheath church. It is marked by a monumental brass describing him as sometime treasurer of Ireland and treasurer of Normandy. Near him is the brass of Sir Robert Alington, Knt., laid to rest in May 1552. (Sir Robert had been married to Margaret, daughter of Sir William Coningsby, Knt., King's Justice). Giles Alington (MP) (June 1499 – 22 August 1586) was Master of Ordnance to King Henry VIII, and lies in splendour with his son, the above-mentioned Sir Robert (who predeceased his father), one above the other, both in armour, heads on helmets and feet on hounds.

There is another Giles Alington, K.B., of Shakespeare's day on an impressive alabaster monument with his wife and their six children, he in slashed breeches and armour, she in a ruff and hooped skirt.

== Horseheath Hall ==
The Alingtons held the manor here and lived at Horseheath Hall. Sir William Alington was killed at the Battle of Bosworth Field in 1485. The Alingtons thrived under the Stuart monarchs and had the privilege of handing to the King his first drink at coronations. The house was rebuilt in 1663–65 by architect Sir Roger Pratt; (Vitruvius Britannicus is wrong in assigning the house to Webb). It was a classical eleven-bay house with a three-bay pediment, quoins, hipped roof, balustrade and belvedere on the roof. It was further enlarged in 1688, but pulled down in 1777. The splendid wrought-iron gates went to St John's College and Trinity College Cambridge, and the rectory at Cheveley.

== See also ==
- Notable people connected with Horseheath
