= Baldwin St George =

English politician

Sir Baldwin St. George (3 September 1362 – 1426), of Hatley St. George, Cambridgeshire, was an English politician.

He was born the son of Sir Baldwin St George (died 1383) of Hatley St George. He was knighted before January 1386.

He was a Member (MP) of the Parliament of England for Cambridgeshire in 1394, 1401, October 1404, 1406, April 1414 and served as High Sheriff of Cambridgeshire and Huntingdonshire for 1409–10.

He married Joan, the daughter of Sir John Engaine and coheiress of his 1st wife Margaret, daughter of Sir John de la Haye of Shepreth. He had three sons, one of whom predeceased him.
