= John Tiptoft =

John Tiptoft may refer to:

- John Tiptoft, 2nd Baron Tibetot (1313 – 1367)
- John Tiptoft, 1st Baron Tiptoft (died 1443)
- John Tiptoft, 1st Earl of Worcester (1427 – 1470), English nobleman and scholar
