= Gerard Russell (politician) =

English politician

Gerard Russell (1620–1682), of Fordham Abbey, Fordham, Cambridgeshire, was an English politician.

== Family ==
Russell was the son of Sir William Russell, 1st Baronet, of Chippenham.

== Career ==
He was a member (MP) of the parliament of England for Cambridgeshire in March 1679.
