= Richard Briscoe =

Briscoe in 1929

Captain Richard George Briscoe MC (15 August 1893 – 11 December 1957) was a British soldier and politician from Longstowe in Cambridgeshire. He was Conservative Member of Parliament (MP) for Cambridgeshire from 1923 to 1945.

He was born in Brewood, Staffordshire, the son of William Arthur Briscoe, of Longstowe Hall, Cambridgeshire. He was educated at Eton College and Magdalen College, Oxford. During the First World War, he served in the Grenadier Guards and was awarded the Military Cross for gallantry. He served again in the Second World War. He died suddenly in 1957 in London.

Parliament of the United Kingdom
| Preceded by Harold Stannus Gray | Member of Parliament for Cambridgeshire; 1923 – 1945 | Succeeded by A. E. Stubbs |
