= Francis Pym =

British politician and life peer (1922–2008)

The Right Honourable The Lord Pym MC PC DL
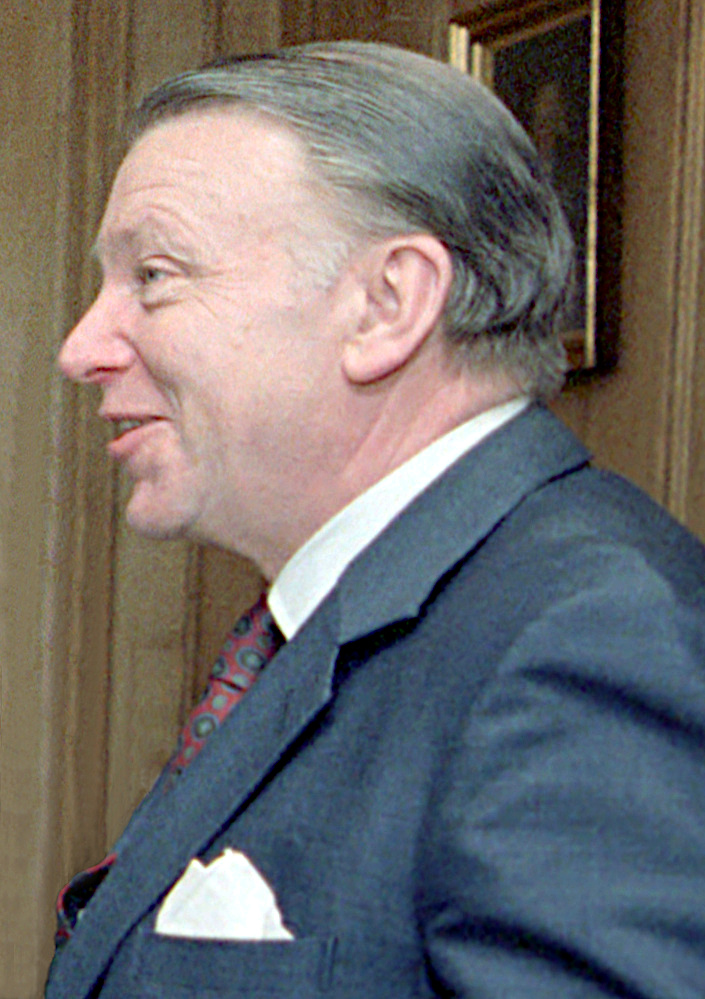
- Pym in 1982

Secretary of State for Foreign and Commonwealth Affairs
- In office 6 April 1982 – 11 June 1983
- Prime Minister: Margaret Thatcher
- Preceded by: The Lord Carrington
- Succeeded by: Geoffrey Howe

Lord President of the Council
- In office 14 September 1981 – 5 April 1982
- Prime Minister: Margaret Thatcher
- Preceded by: The Lord Soames
- Succeeded by: John Biffen

Leader of the House of Commons
- In office 5 January 1981 – 5 April 1982
- Prime Minister: Margaret Thatcher
- Preceded by: Norman St John-Stevas
- Succeeded by: John Biffen

Chancellor of the Duchy of Lancaster
- In office 5 January 1981 – 14 September 1981
- Prime Minister: Margaret Thatcher
- Preceded by: Norman St John-Stevas
- Succeeded by: The Baroness Young

Paymaster General
- In office 5 January 1981 – 14 September 1981
- Prime Minister: Margaret Thatcher
- Preceded by: Angus Maude
- Succeeded by: Cecil Parkinson

Secretary of State for Defence
- In office 4 May 1979 – 5 January 1981
- Prime Minister: Margaret Thatcher
- Preceded by: Fred Mulley
- Succeeded by: John Nott

Secretary of State for Northern Ireland
- In office 2 December 1973 – 4 March 1974
- Prime Minister: Edward Heath
- Preceded by: William Whitelaw
- Succeeded by: Merlyn Rees

Chief Whip of the House of Commons and Parliamentary Secretary to the Treasury
- In office 19 June 1970 – 2 December 1973
- Prime Minister: Edward Heath
- Preceded by: Bob Mellish
- Succeeded by: Humphrey Atkins
Shadow Cabinet posts
Shadow Foreign Secretary
In office 6 November 1978 – 4 May 1979
Leader	Margaret Thatcher
Preceded by	John Davies
Succeeded by	Peter Shore
Shadow Leader of the House of Commons
In office 19 November 1976 – 6 November 1978
Leader	Margaret Thatcher
Preceded by	John Peyton
Succeeded by	Norman St John-Stevas
Shadow Minister of Agriculture, Fisheries and Food
In office 15 January 1976 – 19 November 1976
Leader	Edward Heath
Preceded by	Joseph Godber
Succeeded by	Michael Jopling
In office 11 March 1974 – April 1975
Leader	Edward Heath; Margaret Thatcher
Preceded by	Norman Buchan
Succeeded by	Michael Jopling
Shadow Secretary of State for Northern Ireland
In office 4 March 1974 – 19 June 1974
Leader	Edward Heath
Preceded by	Merlyn Rees
Succeeded by	Ian Gilmour
Opposition Deputy Chief Whip of the House of Commons
In office 22 February 1967 – 19 June 1970
Leader	Edward Heath
Preceded by	Brian Batsford
Succeeded by	Walter Harrison
Parliamentary offices
Member of the House of Lords
Lord Temporal
Life peerage 9 October 1987 – 7 March 2008
Member of Parliament for South East Cambridgeshire
In office 9 June 1983 – 18 May 1987
Preceded by	New constituency
Succeeded by	Jim Paice
Member of Parliament for Cambridgeshire
In office 17 March 1961 – 13 May 1983
Preceded by	Gerald Howard
Succeeded by	Constituency abolished

Personal details
- Born: Francis Leslie Pym; 13 February 1922 Abergavenny, Wales
- Died: 7 March 2008 (aged 86) Sandy, Bedfordshire, England
- Party: Conservative
- Spouse: Valerie Daglish (m. 1949)
- Children: 4
- Parent: Leslie Pym (father)
- Education: Eton College; Magdalene College, Cambridge

Francis Leslie Pym, Baron Pym, MC, PC, DL (13 February 1922 – 7 March 2008) was a British Conservative Party politician who served in various Cabinet positions in the 1970s and 1980s, including Foreign, Defence and Northern Ireland Secretary, and Leader of the House of Commons. He was Member of Parliament (MP) for Cambridgeshire (South East Cambridgeshire after 1983) from 1961 to 1987. Pym was made a life peer in 1987.

== Early life ==
Pym was born at Penpergwm Lodge, near Abergavenny in Monmouthshire. His father, Leslie Pym, was also an MP, while his grandfather, the Rt Revd Walter Pym, was Bishop of Bombay. He was not a direct descendant of the 17th-century parliamentarian John Pym as has been commonly held (see Pym's own published family history), but a collateral descendant.

He was educated at Eton, before going on to Magdalene College, Cambridge in 1940. The following year, his studies were interrupted by military service. For much of the Second World War, Pym served in North Africa and Italy as a captain and regimental adjutant in the 9th Lancers. He was mentioned in despatches twice, awarded the Military Cross, and ended his military service as a major.

Pym was still in Italy when his father died and he inherited the estates, though retaining the family home Hazells near Sandy, Bedfordshire - which had been used as a hospital during the war - was no longer practical. Pym was offered a job by Lord Woolton in Liverpool at his Lewis's department store, so beginning a career in business, in addition to his responsibility for the family estates. Two years later, Pym purchased a stake in a Hereford-based tent maker, which he turned into a successful business.

== Political career ==
Pym entered politics as a member of Herefordshire County Council in 1958. He contested Rhondda West without success in 1959 and entered Parliament in 1961 at a by-election as MP for Cambridgeshire. He held the seat until 1983, and thereafter was MP for South East Cambridgeshire until 1987. He was an opposition whip from 1964 and served under Edward Heath as Government Chief Whip (1970–1973), playing a critical role during the passage of the European Community Bill (1972), which ensured British entry into Europe, as well as the contentious Industrial Relations Bill (1971). He subsequently joined the Heath Cabinet as Northern Ireland Secretary (1973–1974) for a brief but difficult twelve weeks before the government left office.

In opposition, Pym continued to shadow Northern Ireland, in addition to being shadow Agriculture spokesman until June 1974, when he gave up Ulster. In the 1975 Conservative Party leadership election, Pym voted for Heath in the first round and then supported his friend William Whitelaw in the second. Soon after Thatcher became Conservative leader, Pym stepped down from the Shadow Cabinet for a few months due to ill health. He returned as Shadow Leader of the House of Commons in January 1976 and led the opposition to the government's devolution legislation, and did so with some skill, enhancing his reputation. He was later promoted to Shadow Foreign Secretary.

In the first Thatcher Government, Pym served as Defence Secretary (1979–1981), where he robustly defended the siting of cruise missiles in the UK but his successful resistance to Treasury attempts to cut the defence budget led to disagreements with Thatcher and he was moved to become Leader of the House of Commons and Lord President of the Council (1981–1982). He became foreign secretary during the Falklands War in 1982 following Lord Carrington's resignation, but his dogged pursuit of a diplomatic solution again brought him into conflict with the Prime Minister. He was removed by Thatcher the following year after her second election victory.

Pym was a leading member of the "wets", Conservative MPs sceptical of Thatcherism. During the 1983 general election campaign he said on the BBC's Question Time that "Landslides don't on the whole produce successful governments". This was publicly repudiated by Thatcher and he was sacked after the election. Shortly afterwards, he launched a pressure group called Conservative Centre Forward to argue for more centrist, one-nation policies but with Thatcher at the height of her powers, it was unsuccessful. He stood down at the 1987 election and was created a life peer as Baron Pym (of Sandy in the County of Bedfordshire) on 9 October 1987.

He was the author of The Politics of Consent, published in 1984 after he left the government. The book is a guide to the Wets' opposition to Thatcher's leadership style and politics.

He was portrayed by Jeremy Child in the 2002 BBC production of Ian Curteis's The Falklands Play, by Julian Wadham in the 2011 film The Iron Lady and by Guy Siner in the fourth series of The Crown.

== Personal life ==
Pym died in Sandy, Bedfordshire, on 7 March 2008 after a prolonged illness, aged 86. He was survived by his wife, Valerie (1929–2017), whom he married on 25 June 1949, and their four children. His elder son (Francis) Jonathan Pym manages the family's Bedfordshire estate.

== Arms ==
Coat of arms of Francis Pym

Crest
Upon a mount Vert a hind's head erased Or gorged with a collar nebuly Azure and holding in the mouth a trefoil slipped Vert.
Escutcheon
Quarterly, 1st and 4th Sable on a fesse engrailed between three owls Or a trefoil slipped Vert between two cross crosslets of the first all within a bordure of the second (Pym); 2nd Vert on a cross engrailed Ermine a lion rampant reguardant Sable in the dexter canton a mullet Or (Kingsley); 3rd Sable three salmon haurient per pale Argent and Or (Orde).
Supporters
Dexter, rampant upon a sandy mount with tussocks of grass Proper a warhorse in trian aspect Sable mane tail and hooves Or on its head a chanfron and on the neck a crinet both Argent gorged with a double chain pendent therefrom a portcullis Gold; sinister, rampant upon a like mount a bull in trian aspect Sable armed and unguled Or also gorged with a double chain and pendent therefrom a portcullis Gold.
Motto
Ubi Seritur Ibi Floreat

== Bibliography ==
- Horn, Geoff (2025). The Battle for British Entry into the European Community: Whips and Anti-Marketeers. Springer Nature. ISBN 978-3-031-97106-8.
- Pym, Francis (1984). The Politics of Consent. Hamish Hamilton. ISBN 978-0-241-11351-6.
- Theakston, Kevin (2004). British Foreign Secretaries Since 1974. Routledge. ISBN 1-135-76637-1.

Parliament of the United Kingdom
Preceded by Gerald Howard	Member of Parliament for Cambridgeshire; 1961–1983	Constituency abolished
New constituency	Member of Parliament for South East Cambridgeshire; 1983–1987	Succeeded by Jim Paice
Government offices
Preceded by Bob Mellish	Chief Whip of the House of Commons; Parliamentary Secretary to the Treasury; 1970–1973	Succeeded by Humphrey Atkins
Preceded by William Whitelaw	Secretary of State for Northern Ireland; 1973–1974	Succeeded by Merlyn Rees
Preceded by Fred Mulley	Secretary of State for Defence; 1979–1981	Succeeded by John Nott
Preceded by Angus Maude	Paymaster General; 1981	Succeeded by Cecil Parkinson
Preceded by Norman St John-Stevas	Chancellor of the Duchy of Lancaster; 1981	Succeeded by The Baroness Young
Preceded by Norman St John-Stevas	Leader of the House of Commons; 1981–1982	Succeeded by John Biffen
Preceded by The Lord Soames	Lord President of the Council; 1981–1982	Succeeded by John Biffen
Preceded by The Lord Carrington	Secretary of State for Foreign and Commonwealth Affairs; 1982–1983	Succeeded by Geoffrey Howe
Political offices
Preceded by Merlyn Rees	Shadow Secretary of State for Northern Ireland; 1974	Succeeded by Ian Gilmour
Preceded by Joseph Godber	Shadow Minister of Agriculture, Fisheries and Food; 1974–1975	Succeeded by Michael Jopling
Preceded by Michael Jopling	Shadow Minister of Agriculture, Fisheries and Food; 1976	Succeeded by John Peyton
Preceded by John Peyton	Shadow Leader of the House of Commons; 1976–1978	Succeeded by Norman St John-Stevas
Preceded by John Davies	Shadow Foreign Secretary; 1978–1979	Succeeded by Peter Shore
Party political offices
Preceded by Brian Batsford	Conservative Deputy Chief Whip in the House of Commons; 1967–1970	Succeeded by Humphrey Atkins
Preceded by William Whitelaw	Conservative Chief Whip of the House of Commons; 1970–1973	Succeeded by Humphrey Atkins
