= Thomas Hasilden (died c. 1387) =

English politician

Thomas Hasilden (c. 1322 – c. 1387), of Wakefield, Yorkshire and Steeple Morden and Guilden Morden, Cambridgeshire, was an English politician.

He was a member (MP) of the parliament of England for Cambridgeshire in November 1384 and 1386.
