= Thomas Wykes (MP for Cambridgeshire) =

English politician

Thomas Wykes (died c. 1430), of Stetchworth, Cambridgeshire, was an English politician.

He was a member (MP) of the parliament of England for Cambridgeshire in March 1416.
