= Henry North (died 1620) =

English politician

Henry North (1556–1620), of Wickhambrook and Mildenhall, Suffolk, was an English politician. He was a member (MP) of the parliament of England for Cambridge in 1584, and for Cambridgeshire in 1597.

Henry was the third son of Roger North, 2nd Baron North and his wife Winifrid, the daughter of Richard Rich.
