= A. E. Stubbs =

English trade union official and politician

Alderman A. E. Stubbs

Member of Parliament for Cambridgeshire
- In office 1945–1950

Personal details
- Born: Albert Ernest Stubbs; 29 September 1877 Middlesbrough, North Riding of Yorkshire, England
- Died: 4 January 1962 (aged 84)
- Occupation: Trade unionist

Albert Ernest Stubbs (29 September 1877 – 4 January 1962) was an English trade union official and politician.

Stubbs was born in Middlesbrough, and lived with his family in various locations in Yorkshire. He completed an apprenticeship as a printing machinist, and joined the Typographical Association. He moved to Cambridge in March 1914 to work for the Cambridge Daily News, and the following year, he joined the Independent Labour Party

Stubbs played a leading role in the Cambridge Trades Council's work to unionise farm workers in the county, and he became the council's president in 1917. He was not called up during World War I, possibly due to his small stature, but he campaigned for the rights of soldiers and sailors. He was appointed to the county's new agricultural wages board, as a representative of the Workers' Union, then in 1919 he became the full-time District Officer of the Workers' Union for Cambridgeshire and the Isle of Ely.

At the 1918 general election, Stubbs stood in Cambridgeshire, with the backing of the district labour party. However, became he was adopted only ten days before the election, he never received endorsement from the national Labour Party headquarters, and so has been regarded as an independent labour candidate. He took 34.9% of the vote, against a single opponent. He stood again, as an official Labour Party candidate, in 1922 and 1923, consistently taking around one-third of the vote, but was not re-adopted in 1924. He was elected to Cambridge Town Council in 1923, serving until 1926, and then from 1927, becoming the first Labour alderman in 1937. From 1925, and again from 1931 until his death, he served on Cambridgeshire County Council, becoming an alderman in 1942. He also served as a Poor Law Guardian from 1928.

When the Workers' Union amalgamated with the Transport and General Workers' Union (TGWU) in 1929, Stubbs became Cambridge and District Officer for the TGWU. He stood in Melton at the 1929, 1931 and 1935 general elections, gradually increasing his vote share, but not coming close to winning the seat.

Stubbs retired in 1944, but contested Cambridgeshire again at the 1945 general election, finally winning the seat. His campaign focused on improving pay and conditions for agricultural workers, rural housing and supporting veterans and pensioners. He narrowly won the seat, but lost it at the 1950 general election. He continued to sit on local councils and the wages board until his death, in 1962.

Parliament of the United Kingdom
Preceded by Richard Briscoe	Member of Parliament for Cambridgeshire; 1945–1950	Succeeded by Gerald Howard
