= Giles Alington (MP) =

Member of the Parliament of England

Sir Giles Alington (June 1499 – 22 August 1586) was a knight; Lord of the manor of Horseheath, Cambridgeshire; and High Sheriff and MP for Cambridgeshire.

== Family background ==
In the lead up to the Battle of Bosworth in 1485 King Richard III appointed Sir William Alington of Horseheath, Knt., his Commissioner of Array for Cambridgeshire. He made his last will on 15 August and was killed fighting alongside John Howard, 1st Duke of Norfolk. His son and heir was Sir Giles Alington (1483–1522), a Knight of the Bath and twice High Sheriff of Cambridgeshire and Huntingdonshire, who had married Mary Gardiner, daughter & heiress of Sir Richard Gardiner, (died 1489) Lord Mayor of London by his spouse Audria, daughter of William Cotton, Lord of Landwade Manor, Cambridgeshire. The Alingtons who dwelt at Horseheath Hall thrived under the Tudor and Stuart monarchs, and had the privilege of handing to the King his first drink at coronations. Sir Giles Alington was one of the party attending Henry VIII at the Field of the Cloth of Gold tournament in 1520.

== Biography ==
Sir Giles Alington was the eldest son of the eleven children of Sir Giles (1483-1522) and his wife, Mary. He was knighted by King Henry VIII at Whitehall Palace, London, on 11 November 1530. He attended the King as Master of Ordnance at the siege of Boulogne-sur-Mer, noted on the inscription of a clock which he brought from that siege, and affixed over the offices at Horseheath Hall, in which was contained the alarm bell of the garrison of Boulogne.

He was appointed High Sheriff of Cambridgeshire and Huntingdonshire in the 22nd year of the reign of Henry VIII (1531) and again in the 37th year (1546) of the same monarch. He was returned to Parliament as knight of the shire (MP) for Cambridgeshire in 1529, 1539, 1554 and 1558 and also for Liverpool in 1553. Alington served Mary I of England her first drink at the banquet in Westminster Hall following her coronation in 1553.

The Alingtons lived at Horseheath Hall for centuries. The house was rebuilt in 1663–1665 by architect Sir Roger Pratt; (Vitruvius Britannicus is wrong in assigning the house to Webb). It was a neo-classical eleven-bay house with a three-bay pediment, quoins, hipped roof, balustrade and belvedere on the roof. It was further enlarged in 1688, but for reasons now unknown pulled down in 1777. The splendid wrought-iron gates went to St John's College and Trinity College Cambridge, and the rectory at Cheveley.

== Marriages ==
Sir Giles Alington was married three times and outlived his son and heir. "The [1st] marriage, between Ursula daughter of Sir Robert Drury of Hawstead in the County of Suffolk, knight, Privy Councillor" and "Sir Gyles Alington of Horseheath in the countie of Cambridge" is recorded on the tomb of their grandson, James Alington, in Milden parish church, Suffolk. Sir Giles and Ursula (died 1523) had a son and heir, Sir Robert, Knt., (1520–1552), and a daughter who married John Spencer of Althorp.

His second marriage was to Alice Middleton (died before 1564), to whom he had a further five children, including Sir Richard Alington, later Master of the Rolls, (a magnificent monument to Sir Richard is in the Rolls Chapel, Chancery Lane, London). He married, thirdly, by licence dated 1564, Margaret Talkorne (died 1586), who survived him.

In his Will he mentions a worry:-"touching and concerninge the marriage betwene my foresaid nephew [sic; this should read grandson] Giles Alington and Margarett Ellington his Daughter which God is my witness I concluded and made with Sir John Spencer, rather for the goodwill and affection I bore unto him than for the profit. ... and could have had more by a thousand pounds ...". Sir John Spencer was left his "best gowne of velvett furred with marteins" provided he ceased pressure for more than Sir Giles thought "kindlie and frindlie." His second wife Alice was the stepdaughter of Sir Thomas More.

There are several Alington memorials within Horseheath parish church including a tomb of Sir Giles (died 1586) who lies in splendour with one of his sons, one above the other, both in armour, heads on helmets and feet on hounds. There is in addition a brass to Sir Robert Alington, Knt., (d.22 May 1552) who predeceased his father.

There is also another Giles Alington of Shakespeare's day on an impressive alabaster monument with his wife and their six children, he in slashed breeches and armour, she in a ruff and hooped skirt.

== Family descendants ==
The arms of this family are: "Quarterly of six: 1, Sable, a bend engrailed argent between six billets of the second, ALINGTON; 2, Gules, on a bend argent three leopards' heads sable, BURGH; 3, Gules, three covered cups argent, ARGENTINE; 4, Azure, five marlets, two, two, and one or, a canton ermine; 5, Azure, six marlets, three, two, and one or; 6, Sable, per fess and pale argent countercharged three griffins' heads erased of the first. Crest: - A talbot passant proper."

One of Sir Giles Alington's direct descendants, William Alington, became Baron Alington of Killard in the peerage of Ireland in 1642, and they were raised to that of England in 1682; the last Lord Alington d.s.p. in 1722. Arms: Sa. a bend engr. between eight billets ar. Crest: A talbot pass. ppr."

Another notable descendant is the Very Reverend Cyril Argentine Alington (d. 1955), Chaplain to H.M. King George V, Dean of Durham, and sometime Headmaster of Eton College. His daughter, Elizabeth Hester Alington (1909–1990), married Sir Alexander or Alec Douglas-Home (1903–1995), 14th Earl of Home, Lord Home of the Hirsel, and sometime Prime Minister of the United Kingdom.
