= John Hutton (died 1596) =

English politician

John Hutton (died 9 November 1596), of Dry Drayton, Cambridgeshire, was an English politician.

He was the son of Thomas Hutton of Dry Drayton.

He was a justice of the peace for Cambridgeshire from c. 1559 and appointed High Sheriff of Cambridgeshire and Huntingdonshire for 1559–60 and 1574–75.

He was a member (MP) of the Parliament of England for Cambridgeshire in 1563, 1571 and 1572.

He married twice: firstly Sybil, the daughter of Sir John Hynde and widow of Sir John Cutts; and secondly Elizabeth (daughter of William Laurence of St. Ives, Huntingdonshire). He had no children. His widow subsequently married William Hynde, nephew of Hutton's first wife.
