= Thomas Hasilden (died c. 1404) =

English politician

Thomas Hasilden (died c. 1404), of Guilden Morden, Cambridgeshire, was an English politician.

He was a member (MP) of the parliament of England for Cambridgeshire in 1395, January 1397, September 1397 and 1401.
