= Payn Tiptoft =

English politician

Sir Payn Tiptoft (c. 1351 – c. 1413), of Burwell, Cambridgeshire, was an English politician.

He was a member (MP) of the parliament of England for Cambridgeshire in 1399 and January 1404.
