= Beck Hall =

Grade II listed 18th-century farmhouse in Billingford, Breckland, Norfolk, England

Coordinates: 52.7470°N 0.9941°E

Beck Hall, Bec Hall or Bek Hall is a grade II listed 18th-century farmhouse in Billingford, Breckland, Norfolk, England. It is believed to be on the site of a former "hospital" or "hospice" (i.e. a hostel) adjacent to the Chapel of St Paul. The hospital was founded by William of Bec (or Beck): records go back before 1224 (in the reign of King Henry III). The hospital was dedicated to St Thomas of Canterbury. An early resident of Bec was Alanus Elfwold (1248).

The hospital (moated) was on the main road between Norwich and Walsingham and was intended for the lodging for a single night of 13 poor travellers as they made their pilgrimage to the shrine of Our Lady of Walsingham. The hospital was, at an early date in its history, well endowed with the manors of Beck, Billingford, and Howe, and with certain lands and rents in upwards of thirty Norfolk parishes.

The hospital appears to have become a residence and may have been leased by The Church authorities before the Dissolution of the Monasteries. In the second half of the 15th century at least three generations of the Curson (or Curzon) family, descendants of the Kedleston family, held Beck Hall in Norfolk.

With the dissolution in the mid-16th century the property was granted to Sir John Perrot.
