= John Chalers =

14th-century English politician

Sir John Chalers or Deschalers (1361–1388), of Whaddon, Cambridgeshire and Wyddial, Hertfordshire, was an English politician.

He was a member (MP) of the parliament of England for Cambridgeshire in February 1388.
