= John North (died 1597) =

English politician

John North (c. 1551–1597), of Cambridgeshire, was an English politician.

He was a Member (MP) of the Parliament of England for Cambridge in 1572, for Cambridgeshire in 1584, 1586 and 1589 and for Orford in 1593.

== Life ==
He was born about 1551, was the eldest son of Roger North, 2nd Baron North, of Kirtling or Cartelage, Cambridgeshire, and Winifred, daughter of Richard, lord Rich, widow of Sir Henry Dudley, knt. (Visitation of Nottingham, Harl. Soc. Publ. iv. 82). In November 1562, 'being then of immature age,' he was matriculated fellow- commoner of Peterhouse, of which college his grandfather, Edward, first baron North [q. v.], was a benefactor. Young North was entrusted to the care of John Whitgift, who instructed him in good learning and Christian manners (Strype, Whitgift, p. 14). He migrated to Trinity College in 1567, when Whitgift became master of Trinity, and in November 1569 took the oath as a scholar of the university. On 19 April 1572 the senate passed a grace that his six years' study in humanioribus literis might suffice for his inception in arts, and on 6 May he was admitted M.A. On this occasion the corporation presented him with gifts of wine and sugar, at a cost of 38s. 9d. (Cooper, Annals of Cambridge, p. 307). On Friday, after the nativity of St. John the Baptist, 1572, he was made a free burgess and elected an alderman of Cambridge. In 1576, in accordance with the custom of the times, he travelled in Italy, being away for two years and two months.

In 1579, after the union of Utrecht, North went to the Netherlands with Sir John Norris (1547?–1597) [q. v.], and took service as a volunteer in the cause of the provinces. He returned to England in 1580, and probably married. He may be the Mr. North who visited Poland in 1581 (Dee, Diary, p. 19), and who, after returning in 1582, had an audience of the queen, who had been sumptuously entertained at Kirtling in 1578. He was returned M.P. for Cambridgeshire to the fifth parliament of Elizabeth in 1584. He again went to the Netherlands with Leicester and Sidney late in 1585. At Flushing he had a violent quarrel with one Webbe, whose eyes he attempted to gouge out in a desperate encounter. Webbe appealed to Leicester as supreme governor, but he strangely decided that, as both were Englishmen, the matter was in the queen's cognisance. North then returned to England, and sat for Cambridgeshire in the sixth parliament of Elizabeth, which met in October 1586; and again in the seventh, which was summoned for November 1587, but was prorogued to February 1588 (Returns of Members; Willis, Not. Parl. iii. pt. 2, pp. 99, 108, 118). He went a third time to the Netherlands, and joined the enemy in 1597, 'for religion's sake only;' but sent information to his father of certain plots formed against the queen by Thomas Arundell, who had been created a count of the empire.

He died in Flanders during his father's lifetime, 5 June 1597.

== Family ==
He married Dorothy, daughter and heiress of Sir Valentine Dale, LL.D., master of the requests, by whom he had issue: Dudley North, 3rd Baron North, godson of the Earl of Leicester; Elizabeth, wife of William, son of Sir Jerome Horsey; Sir John North, K.B.; Roger, a colonial projector; Gilbert; and Mary, wife of Sir Francis Coningsby of South Mimms, Hertfordshire.
