= William Hynde =

English politician

Sir William Hynde (c. 1558 – 28 March 1606), of Madingley, Cambridgeshire, was an English politician.

== Family ==
Born in 1558, Hynde was the eldest son of the MP Francis Hynde. He was educated at Queens' College, Cambridge and Gray's Inn, 1577. He inherited his father's estates on the latter's death in 1596, and was knighted in 1603.

== Career ==
He was a Member (MP) of the Parliament of England for Cambridgeshire in 1597. He was subsequently a justice of the peace for Cambridgeshire and served as High Sheriff of Cambridgeshire and Huntingdonshire for 1600–1.

He died in 1606 and was buried at Madingley. He had married twice; firstly Elizabeth, the daughter of Thomas, 2nd Lord Wentworth of Nettlestead, Suffolk and secondly another Elizabeth, the daughter of William Lawrence of St. Ives, Huntingdonshire and the widow of John Hutton of Dry Drayton. He had no children.
