= Edmund de la Pole (Captain of Calais) =

English knight

Sir Edmund de la Pole (died 1419) was an English knight and Captain of Calais.

He was the second son of Sir William de la Pole of Hull and younger brother of Michael de la Pole, 1st Earl of Suffolk.

He was Captain of Calais castle and controller of the town from 1384 to 1388.

He served as High Sheriff of Cambridgeshire and Huntingdonshire for 1389 and a JP from 1390. He was knight of the shire (MP) for Buckinghamshire in 1376 and 1383 and Cambridgeshire in 1395.

By his first wife Elizabeth de Haudlo, daughter of Richard de Haudlo and sister of Edmund de Haudlo of Boarstall, Buckinghamshire, and of Hadlow, Kent, he had Elizabeth de la Pole (14 July 1362 – 14 December 1403), who married Sir Ingram Bruyn of South Ockendon, Essex (Titchfield, Hampshire, 6 December 1353 – 12 August 1400, buried South Ockendon, Essex), grandson of Maurice le Brun, 1st Baron Brun. His second wife was Maud, daughter of John Lovett, with whom he had a son, Walter, who became Constable of Ireland.

He died on 3 August 1419 at his seat at Boarstall, Buckinghamshire.
