= Robert Denny (MP) =

14th-century English politician

Sir Robert Denny (died 1419), of London and Barham in Linton, Cambridgeshire, was an English politician.

== Family ==
Denny came from a family of fishmongers. His father was Geoffrey Denny (who died in 1375), a London fishmonger. His mother was Geoffrey's first wife, Cecily née Waltham, also from a family of fishmongers. By 1384, Robert Denny had married Amy or Anne, who died after him, dying c. 1423. She had previously been married to John Furneaux of Middle Harling, Norfolk and Barham. Denny and his wife had one son.

== Career ==
Denny was knighted at some point before March 1387. He was a member (MP) of the Parliament of England for Cambridgeshire in 1391 and 1393.
