= Eliot Constantine Yorke =

British politician and courtier

The Hon. Captain Eliot Constantine Yorke DL MP (13 July 1843 – 21 December 1878), was a British politician and courtier.

== Background ==
Yorke was the fourth son of Admiral Charles Philip Yorke, 4th Earl of Hardwicke, and the Hon. Susan, daughter of Thomas Liddell, 1st Baron Ravensworth.

== Political career ==
The Conservative Party adopted Yorke as their candidate at a meeting in Cambridge in October 1873. Yorke was returned to Parliament as one of three representatives for Cambridgeshire in 1874 (succeeding his elder brother Lord Royston), a seat he held until his early death four years later. He was also a captain in the Cambridgeshire Militia, an Equerry to His Royal Highness the Duke of Edinburgh and a Deputy Lieutenant of Cambridgeshire.

== Family ==
On 11 February 1873, Yorke married Annie, daughter of Sir Anthony de Rothschild, 1st Baronet, and the marriage was solemnised the next day at St. Andrew's Parish Church, Wimpole, Cambridgeshire. They had no children.

On 21 December 1878, he died at 17 Curzon Street, Mayfair, London, aged 35.

Parliament of the United Kingdom
Preceded by Lord George Manners; Viscount Royston; Hon. Sir Henry Brand	Member of Parliament for Cambridgeshire; 1874–1878; With: Lord George Manners 1874; Hon. Sir Henry Brand 1874–1878; Benjamin Rodwell 1874–1878	Succeeded by Hon. Sir Henry Brand; Benjamin Rodwell; Edward Hicks
