= Sheriff of Cambridgeshire and Huntingdonshire =

List of law enforcement officials

This is an incomplete list of sheriffs of Cambridgeshire and Huntingdonshire in England from 1154 until the abolition of the office in 1965.

Exceptionally, the two counties shared a single sheriff. Sheriffs had a one-year term of office, being appointed at a meeting of the privy council generally held in February or March and holding office until the similar meeting in the next year. In 1648 it became the practice to rotate the office between inhabitants of Cambridgeshire proper, the Isle of Ely and Huntingdonshire. This was done in a three-year cycle, with an inhabitant of each area occupying the office in turn.

Note: the years shown are the date of commencement of the sheriff's year of office. For example, the high sheriff appointed in March 1892 "for the year 1892" held office until March 1893.

== Before 1200 ==
- Before 1154 – See High Sheriff of Cambridgeshire
- 1154: Richard Basset and Aubrey de Vere
- 1155–1161: Payn and Robert Grimball
- 1162: Nicholai de Chenet
- Michaelmas 1163: Hamo Petom or Pecc'm
- 1165: Hamo Petom and Philip de Daventry
- Easter 1166: Philip de Daventry
- 1166–1168: Philip de Daventry
- Easter 1170: Everard de Beach and Warin de Basingborn
- 1171–1176: Everard de Beach
- Easter 1177: Walter son of Hugonis
- 1180: Walter son of Hugonis and William, son of Stephen
- Michaelmas 1182: Radulph or Ralph de Bardulf
- 1183: Walter son of Hugonis
- Michaelmas 1185: Nicholas, son of Robert
- 1189: Nicholas son of Robert
- Michaelmas 1189: William Muschet
- Michaelmas 1191: Richard Anglicus
- Michaelmas 1192: Richard (Reginald) de Argenton
- 1196: Thomas de Huntsdon
- Michaelmas 1195: Werricus de Marignes
- 1197: Merric de Marignes
- Michaelmas 1197: Robert de Lisle

== 1200–1299 ==
- Michaelmas 1200: Hamo de Valoignes
- Easter 1201: Walter de Stukeley
- Easter 1203: Warin son of Gerold
- Michaelmas 1204: Robert de Tateshall and Magister Aristoteles
- Easter 1205: Joscelin de Stukeley
- 5 April 1207: Fulk son of Theobald
- 23 May 1212: William Longespée, 3rd Earl of Salisbury
- 9 March 1216: Falkes de Breauté
- 18 January 1224: Richard de Argentine
- 23 January 1224: Geoffrey de Hadfield
- 10 May 1232: Jeremias de Caxton
- 7 July 1232: Peter de Rivall
- 1 May 1234: Jeremias de Caxton
- 23 October 1236: Henry de Colne
- 16 December 1242: Hugo de Hodeng
- 26 June 1244: Ralph de Bereford
- 15 February 1246: Philip de Staunton
- 19 April 1249: John le Scalarus
- 11 May 1249: Henry Colville
- 6 October 1251: Simon de Horton
- 17 October 1253: John le Moyne
- 17 May 1255: John de Marines
- 11 May 1256: William de Stow
- 3 November or December 1258: William le Moyne, of Ravet
- Michaelmas 1259: John le Scalarus
- 9 July 1261: John Lovell
- 26 February 1262: Sacrus or Sayer de Frivile
- 8 October 1262: John Lovell
- 18 June 1264: John le Scalarus
- 24 August 1265: John le Moyne
- Michaelmas 1265: Almaricus Pech
- 23 November 1267: Baldwin de St George
- Christmas 1267: Sacrus or Sayer de Frivile
- 5 August 1270: Robert de Estre
- 19 October 1274: Walter Shelfhanger
- Michaelmas 1275: William le Moyne
- 25 October 1278: Baldwin de St George
- 8 November 1279: William de Rothing or de Roing
- 28 November 1281: Thomas de Belhus
- 17 October 1289: Henry de Norwich
- 29 October 1289: Hugo de Babington
- 10 April 1296: William de Mortuo Mari, of Frekenham
- 19 October 1297: William de Sutton
- 4 October 1298: Thomas de Gardinor or de Gardinis

== 1300–1399 ==
- 6 October 1300: Robert Hereward
- 17 April 1301–1305: Robert de Baiocis
- 3 November 1307: John de Creekes and Robert de Hoo
- 23 April 1311: John de Swineford
- 29 November 1311: John de Creekes
- 16 October 1314–1315: Thomas de Scalariis
- 20 October 1315: Ralph Giffard
- 29 November 1318: Mathew de Bassingborne
- 18 April 1319: Ralph Giffard
- 27 May 1319: Matthew de Bassingborne
- 17 October 1319: John de Creekes
- 3 November 1320: Almeric la Zouche
- 24 April 1327: Matthew de Bassingborne
- 11 August 1328: William Howard
- 22 September 1328: Sir Almaric la Zouche
- 5 December 1330: William le Moyne
- 6 February 1332: Warin de Bassingborne
- 13 September 1332: Richard de Baiocis
- 10 November 1333: William, son of John Mutchett
- 5 May 1335: John de Lymbury
- 12 May 1336: Thomas de Lacy
- 20 October 1336 William de Muschett
- 16 October 1338: Warin de Bassingborne
- 10 November 1340: John de Lacy
- Christmas 1340: John de Papworth
- 4 December 1341: Warin de Bassingborne
- 4 November 1345: John Engeyne, of Teversham
- 13 November 1347: Warin de Bassingborne
- 31 May 1348: Guy de St. Clair
- 30 October 1351: John Lisle de Rubeo Monts
- 22 November 1352: Guy de St Clair
- 10 November 1354: Thomas de Scalariis, the elder
- 20 October 1355: John de Harewdon
- 10 November 1356: Nicholas de Styuccle
- 21 November 1360: John Furneux
- 31 August 1361: Edmund Furneux
- 18 October 1361: Nicholas de Styuccle
- 5 November 1371: William de Papworth, of Papworth St Agnes
- 12 December 1372: Roger Harlaston
- 7 November 1373: Thomas Sewall
- 12 December 1374: Thomas Torell
- 4 October 1375: Sir Baldwin St George
- 26 October 1376: Sir John Engaine
- 26 November 1377: Sir John Avenel, of Gamlinggay
- 25 November 1378: William Moyne
- 5 November 1379: Ralph Wyke
- 18 October 1380: Henry English, of Wood Ditton
- 15 December 1381: Thomas Sewall
- 24 November 1382: Sir William Moyne, of Great Raseley, Hunts.
- 1 November 1383: Philip Tilney, of Boston, Lincolnshire
- 11 November 1384: Henry English, of Wood Ditton
- 20 October 1385: John Heningford
- 18 November 1386: Robert de Paris, of Hildersham
- November 1387: Sir William Papworth, of Papworth St Agnes
- 1 December 1388: Sir William Cheyne
- 15 November 1389: Sir Edmund de la Pole
- 7 November 1390: Robert de Paris, of Hildersham
- 21 October 1391: Sir Nicholas Stewkeley
- 18 October 1392: John Knyvet
- 7 November 1393: Sir William Cheyne
- 9 August 1394: Nicholas Paris
- 9 November 1395: John Lakyngheth
- 29 October 1396: William Fulburne
- 1 December 1396: John Harlington, of Yaxley, Hunts.
- 3 November 1397: Andrew Newport, of Colvilles in Fulbourn, Cambs.
- 22 August 1399: Thomas Hasilden

== 1400–1499 ==
- 24 November 1400: William Rees
- 8 November 1401: Sir Payn Tiptoft
- 14 February 1402: Sir John Howard, of Fowlmere
- 4 November 1403: John Hobildod, of Tadlow
- 18 November 1404: Sir Payn Tiptoft
- 22 November 1405: Robert Scott, of Abbotsley, Hunts. (1st term)
- 5 November 1406: Sir John Bernakes
- 30 November 1407: John Hobildod, of Tadlow
- 15 November 1408: John Danyell
- 4 November 1409: Sir Baldwin St George, of Hatley St. George
- 29 November 1410: William Allein
- 10 December 1411: Robert Scott, of Abbotsley, Hunts. (2nd term)
- 3 November 1412: John Walden
- 6 November 1413: Sir Robert Hackebeche, of Hackbeach, Norfolk and Litlington, Cambs.
- 29 September 1414: William Alington, of Bottisham
- 14 December 1415: Thomas Beville, of Wood Walton, Hunts.
- 30 November 1416: Robert Scott, of Abbotsley, Hunts. (3rd term)
- 10 November 1417: Sir Walter de la Pole, of Dernford in Sawston (1st term)
- 4 November 1418: William Asenhill, of Guilden Morden
- 23 November 1419: Thomas Beville, of Wood Walton, Hunts.
- 16 November 1420: Robert Scott, of Abbotsley, Hunts. (4th term)
- 3 May 1423: William Alington, of Bottisham
- 16 November 1424: Sir Walter de la Pole, of Dernford in Sawston (2nd term)
- 6 November 1425: Sir Nicholas Stucle
- 15 January 1426: John Hore, of Childerley
- 12 December 1426: Thomas Deschalers, of Whaddon, Cambridgeshire
- 7 November 1427: Nicholas Alington
- 4 November 1428: Sir Walter de la Pole, of Dernford in Sawston (3rd term)
- 10 February 1430: Laurence Cheyne, of Fen Ditton
- 5 November 1430: John Ansty of Stow Quy
- 26 November 1431: Sir John Shardlow
- 17 September 1432: John Clopton
- 5 November 1432: Robert Stonham
- 5 November 1433: Roger Hunt
- 7 November 1435: Laurence Cheyne, of Fen Ditton
- 8 November 1436: Robert Stonham
- 7 November 1437: William Alington the younger, of Horseheath (son of William, HS 1423)
- 3 November 1438: Gilbert Hore
- 5 November 1439: Henry Langley
- 4 November 1441: William Lee
- 6 November 1443: Thomas Peyton, of Isleham
- 4 November 1443: Sir William St George
- 4 November 1445: John Chalers
- 9 November 1447: Thomas Bernard
- 9 November 1448: Sir Walter Trumpington
- 7 February 1450: John Harlaston
- 8 February 1451: William Alington of Horseheath
- 8 November 1451: Thomas Tresham
- 8 November 1452: Thomas Peyton, of Isleham (2nd term)
- 29 May 1454: William Hasilden
- 4 November 1454: Henry Paris
- 6 April 1456: John Broughton
- 30 June 1457: William Vaux
- 14 December 1457: Thomas Tresham
- 3 December 1458: Sir John Colville
- 15 February 1460: Sir Thomas Finderne
- 22 November 1460: William Lowe
- 6 March 1461: John Alington
- 7 November 1461: John Stucle
- 5 November 1463: John Cheyne
- 5 November 1464: John Broughton the younger
- 5 November 1465: Sir Henry Berkeley
- 5 November 1466: John Forster
- 5 November 1467: Sir William St George
- 5 November 1468: Richard Sapcote
- 5 November 1469: Thomas Gray (1st term)
- 6 November 1470: William Fyldyng
- 11 April 1471: Sir Thomas Gray (2nd term; knighted 3 May 1471)
- 9 November 1471: John Ansty (grandson of John Ansty in 1430)
- 9 November 1472: Thomas Pigott
- 5 November 1473: John Broughton the younger
- 7 November 1474: Sir John Cheyne
- 5 November 1475: Thomas Cotton of Landwade, Cambs
- 5 November 1476: William Alington the younger (d.1485)
- 5 November 1477: William Frevill the elder
- 5 November 1479: Robert Paris
- 5 November 1480: Thomas Huntingdon
- 5 November 1481: Geoffrey Bloodwell
- 5 November 1482: Robert Tilney
- 5 November 1483: Robert Tanfield
- 6 November 1484: John Wake
- 12 September 1485: Sir John Hudleston
- 5 November 1485: William Finderne
- 5 November 1486: Thomas Oxenbrigge
- 4 November 1487: William Taillard
- 4 November 1488: John or William Hasilden
- 5 November 1489: William Wentworth
- 5 November 1490: Sir Thomas Cheyney
- 5 November 1491: William Cheyney
- 26 November 1492: John Burgoyne
- 7 November 1493: Thomas Cotton of Conington, Hunts
- 5 November 1494: Gerrard Stukeley
- 5 November 1495: Sir Thomas Cheyney
- 5 November 1496: Christopher de Peyton
- 5 November 1497: Richard Stuteville
- 5 November 1498: Sir Robert Peyton
- 11 November 1499: Thomas Cotton, of Conington, Hunts

== 1500–1599 ==
- 15 November 1500: John Clarevaux
- 5 November 1501: Edward Lucy
- 8 November 1502: Sir Thomas Cheyne
- 18 November 1503: Christopher Druell
- 5 November 1504: John Frevile
- 1 December 1505: Anthony Mallory
- 3 December 1507: Sir William Finderne
- 15 December 1508: Thomas Gery
- 14 November 1509: Francis Hasilden, of Steeple Morden, Cambs.
- 9 November 1510: John Paris, of Linton, Cambs.
- 8 November 1511: Sir Giles Alington, of Horseheath, Cambs. (1st term)
- 7 November 1512: Thomas Cotton, of Conington, Hunts.
- 9 November 1513: Thomas Thursby, of Caxton, Cambs.
- 7 November 1514: Sir Ralph Chamberlayne, of Kingston Woodhouse, Cambs.
- 5 November 1515: John Paris, of Linton, Cambs. (2nd term)
- 10 November 1516: Sir John Cutts, of Childerley, Cambs.
- 9 November 1517: William Tanfield, of Everton, Hunts.
- 8 November 1518: Anthony Mallory, of Papworth St Agnes, Cambs.
- 8 November 1519: Sir Giles Alington, of Horseheath, Cambs. (2nd term)
- 6 November 1520: Francis Hasilden, of Steeple Morden, Cambs. (2nd term)
- Easter 1521: Richard Colvile
- 3 February 1522: John More, of Whaddon, Cambs.
- 12 November 1522: Philip Paris
- 13 November 1523: Anthony Hansard, of March, Isle of Ely
- 27 January 1524: John Huddleston, of Sawston, Cambs.
- 27 January 1526: Robert Peyton, of Isleham, Cambs.
- 7 November 1526: Thomas Pygot, of Abington Pigotts, Cambs.
- 16 November 1527: Robert Apreece, of Washingley House, Hunts.
- 7 November 1528: Philip Paris, of Linton, Cambs.
- 9 November 1529: Anthony Hansard, of March, Isle of Ely (2nd term)
- 11 November 1530: Sir Giles Alington, of Horseheath, Cambs. (1st term)
- 9 November 1531: Anthony Mallory, of Papworth St Agnes, Cambs. (2nd term)
- 20 November 1532: Sir Thomas Elyot, of Carlton, Cambs.
- 17 November 1533: Sir Richard Sapcott, of Elton, Hunts. (present-day Cambridgeshire)
- 14 November 1534: Thomas Chicheley, of Wimpole, Cambs.
- 22 November 1535: Robert Peyton, of Isleham, Cambs. (2nd term)
- 27 November 1536: Richard Cromwell, of Hinchingbrooke Castle, Hunts.
- 14 November 1537: Thomas Megges
- 15 November 1538: Thomas Hutton, of Dry Drayton, Cambs.
- 17 November 1539: Philip Paris, of Linton, Cambs.
- 17 November 1540: Richard Cromwell, of Hinchingbrooke Castle, Hunts. (2nd term)
- 27 November 1541: Oliver Leder, of Great Staughton, Hunts.
- 22 November 1542: Sir Edward North, of Catlidge, Cambs.
- 23 November 1543: Robert Aprice, of Washingley House, Hunts.
- 16 November 1544: Sir Thomas Elyot, of Carlton, Cambs.
- 22 November 1545: Sir Giles Alington, of Horseheath (2nd term)
- 23 November 1546: Sir Laurence Tailard, of Dodington, Hunts.
- 27 November 1547: Thomas Cotton, of Conington, Hunts.
- 3 December 1548: John Huddleston, of Sawston, Cambs.
- 12 November 1549: Sir John Cotton, of Landwade (1st term)
- 11 November 1550: Thomas Bolles the elder, of Wallington, Herts.
- 11 November 1551: Sir John Cutts, of York
- 10 November 1552: Sir Giles Alington, of Horseheath (3rd term)
- 8 November 1553: Robert Peyton, of Isleham, Cambridgeshire
- 14 November 1554: Oliver Leder, of Great Staughton, Hunts.
- 14 November 1555: Sir Laurence Tailard, of Dodington, Hunts.
- 13 November 1556: Sir John Cotton, of Landwade, Cambs. (2nd term)
- 16 November 1557: Sir Robert Tyrwhytt, of Leighton Bromswold, Hunts.
- 23 November 1558: William Lawrence, of St Ives, Cambs.
- 9 November 1559: John Hutton, of Dry Drayton, Cambs.
- 12 November 1560: Thomas Cotton, of Landwade, Cambs.
- 8 November 1561: Francis Hynde, of Madingley, Cambs.
- 19 November 1562: Henry Darcy, of Leighton Bromswold, Hunts.
- 8 November 1563: Clement Chicheley, of Wimpole, Cambs.
- 9 November 1564: William Mallory, of Papworth St Agnes, Cambs.
- 16 November 1565: Sir Henry Cromwell, of Hinchingbrooke Castle and Ramsey Abbey, Hunts.
- 18 November 1566: William Worthington, of Haslingfield, Cambs.
- 18 November 1567: Robert Peyton, of Isleham, Cambs.
- 18 November 1568: Thomas Ryvett, of Chippenham, Cambs.
- 12 November 1569: Henry Longe, of Shingay, Cambs.
- 13 November 1570: Francis Hynde, of Madingley, Cambs.
- 14 November 1571: Sir Henry Cromwell, of Hinchingbrooke Castle and Ramsey Abbey, Hunts.
- 13 November 1572: Sir John Cutts, of York or Childerley, Cambs.
- 10 November 1573: Thomas Wendy, of Haslingfield, Cambs.
- 15 November 1574: John Hutton, of Long Stanton, Cambs.
- 15 November 1575: William Mallory, of Papworth St Agnes, Cambs.
- 13 November 1576: Robert Bevill, of Chesterton, Hunts.
- 27 November 1577: Thomas Ryvett
- 17 November 1578: Fitz Ralph Chamberlaine, of Kingston Woodhouse, Cambs.
- 23 November 1579: Thomas Holmes
- 21 November 1580: Sir Henry Cromwell, of Hinchingbrooke Castle, Hunts.
- 27 November 1581: Robert Taylor
- 5 December 1582: Thomas Cotton, of Conington, Hunts.
- 25 November 1583: Sir Henry Darcy, of Leighton Bromswold, Hunts.
- 19 November 1584: Anthony Cage, of Longstowe, Cambs.
- 22 November 1585: Thomas Wendy, of Haslingfield, Cambs.
- 14 November 1586: Robert Peyton, of Isleham, Cambs.
- 4 December 1587: Francis Cromwell, of Hemingford Grey, Hunts.
- 25 November 1588: Robert Bevill, of Chesterton, Hunts.
- 24 November 1589: Sir Francis Hynde, of Madingley, Cambs.
- 24 November 1590: Thomas Chicheley, of Wimpole, Cambs.
- 25 November 1591: John Cotton, of Landwade, Cambs.
- 16 November 1592: Henry Cromwell, of Upwood, Hunts.
- 26 November 1593: Sir John Peyton, of Isleham, Cambs.
- 21 November 1594: Thomas March, of Waresley, Hunts.
- 27 November 1595: Robert Brudenell, of Doddington, Cambs.
- 22 November 1596: Anthony Cage, of Longstowe, Cambs.
- 25 November 1597: Sir Gervase Clifton, of Leighton Bromswold, Hunts.
- 22 November 1598: Oliver Cromwell, of Hinchingbrooke Castle, Hunts.
- 2 December 1599: Giles Alington, of Horseheath, Cambs.

== 1600–1699 ==
- 24 November 1600: William Hynde, of Madingley, Cambs.
- 2 December 1601: Sir John Cutts, of Childerley, Cambs.
- 7 December 1602: Thomas Wendy, of Haslingfield, Cambs.
- 1 December 1603: John Bedell, of Hamerton, Hunts.
- 5 November 1604: Sir John Peyton, of Isleham, Cambs.
- 2 February 1605: Sir Robert Bevill, of Chesterton, Hunts.
- 17 November 1606: Sir Thomas Jermy, of Teversham, Cambs.
- 9 November 1607: Sir Robert Payne of Midloe, Hunts.
- 12 November 1608: John Cage, of Longstowe, Cambs.
- 1609: Sir Oliver Cheney
- 6 November 1610: Sir Roger Millicent, of Barham in Linton, Cambs.
- 1611: Sir Simeon Steward, of Stuntney, Isle of Ely
- 1612: Edward Hind, of Madingley, Cambs.
- 1613: Thomas Baldwin, of Great Staughton, Hunts.
- 1614: Edward Aldred
- 6 November 1615: Sir Miles Sandys, 1st Baronet, of Wilburton, Isle of Ely
- 11 November 1616: Francis Brown, of Hunts.
- 6 November 1617: William Wendy, of Haslingfield, Cambs.
- 9 November 1618: Sir Thomas Steward, of Stuntney, Isle of Ely
- 1619: Sir John Cutts, of Swavesey and Childerley
- 6 November 1620: Thomas Maples, of Stow, Hunts.
- 1621: Robert Symons, of Witchford, Isle of Ely
- 7 November 1622: Sir Edward Peyton, 2nd Baronet, of Isleham, Cambs.
- 1623: Robert Audley, of Great Gransden, Hunts.
- 1624: Sir James Reynolds, of Fen Ditton, Cambs.
- 1625: Martin Pierce, of Cambridge, Cambs.
- 1626: John Goldsburgh, of Godmanchester, Hunts.
- 4 November 1627: Robert Hagar, of Bourn, Cambs.
- 1628: Thomas Parke, of Wisbech, Isle of Ely
- 1629: Jacob Pedley, of Abbotsley, Hunts.
- 7 November 1630: Thomas Terrell the elder, of Fulbourn, Cambs.
- 1631: Richard Covell or Colvile, of Newton, Isle of Ely
- 1632: Sir Capell Bedell, 1st Baronet, of Hamerton, Hunts.
- 10 November 1633: Anthony Cage, of Longstowe, Cambs.
- 5 November 1634: Robert Balam, of Elm, Isle of Ely
- 1635: Sir Lodowick Dyer, 1st Baronet, of Great Staughton, Hunts.

From 1636 to 1642 separate sheriffs were appointed for Cambridgeshire and Huntingdonshire.

Sheriffs of Cambridgeshire:

- 3 October 1636: Sir John Carleton, 1st Baronet, of Cheveley
- 30 September 1637: Sir Thomas Chicheley, of Wimpole Hall
- 4 November 1638: Sir Thomas Wendy, of Haslingfield
- 1639: Thomas Prichard, of Trumpington
- 1640: John Crane, of Kingston
- 1641: Sir John Cotton, 1st Baronet, of Landwade

Sheriffs of Huntingdonshire:

- 3 October 1636: Sir Thomas Cotton, 2nd Baronet
- 30 September 1637: Sir John Hewet, 2nd Baronet
- 4 November 1638: Sir Thomas Lake
- 1639: Sir William Airmine, 1st Baronet
- 1640: William Leman
- 1641: Richard Stone

In 1642, the appointment of joint Sheriffs of Cambridgeshire and Huntingdonshire resumed.

- 1642: Robert Coke
- 1643: Christopher Rose, of Cambridge, Cambs.
- 30 December 1643: Thomas Martin, of Barton, Cambs.
- 1644: Onslow Winch
- 1645: Tristram Diamond
- 1 December 1646: John Hobart
- 1647: Francis Bickley
- 1647: Tristram Dimond of Upwell.
- 30 May 1648: Thomas Marshe, of Swaffham, Cambs.
- 23 November 1648: Henry Pickering, of Paxton, Hunts.
- 7 November 1649: Robert Castle, of East Hatley, Cambs.
- 7 November 1650: John Towers, of Haddenham, Isle of Ely
- 4 November 1651: Sir Heneage Proby, of Elton Hall, Hunts.
- 12 November 1652: Levinus Bennet, of Babraham, Cambridgeshire
- 10 November 1653: Sir William Sidney
- 16 November 1653: William Fisher, of Wisbech, Isle of Ely
- 1654: Hugh Audley, of St Ives Priory, Hunts.
- 1655: Thomas Duckett, of Steeple Morden, Cambs.
- 1656: Richard Woodward
- 1657: Thomas Bateman
- 1658: John Jenkinson
- 5 November 1660: William Colville, of Newton, Isle of Ely
- 1661: Sir John Hewet, 2nd Baronet, of Hunts.
- 1662: Sir Thomas Hatton, 2nd Baronet, of Long Stanton, Cambs.
- 1663: William March, of Haddenham, Isle of Ely
- 1664: John Dryden, of Chesterton, Hunts.
- 12 November 1665: Sir Thomas Willys, 1st Baronet, of Fen Ditton, Cambs.
- 7 November 1666: John Caryll, of Woodhouse in Chatteris, Isle of Ely
- 6 November 1667: Sir Robert Sewster, of Upwood, Hunts.
- 6 November 1668: William Whitmore
- 25 November 1668: James Thompson, of Trumpington, Cambs.
- 11 November 1669: Haynes Barley, of Wilburton, Isle of Ely
- 3 November 1670: John Bradbourne, of Hunts.
- 9 November 1671: John Clerke, of Snailwell, Cambs.
- 11 November 1672: Thomas or Richard Read, of Whittlesea, Isle of Ely
- 12 November 1673: Castel Sherard, of Glatton, Hunts.
- 5 November 1674: George Pike, of Meldreth, Cambs.
- 15 November 1675: Christopher Turner, of Whittlesea, Isle of Ely
- 9 November 1676: William Drury
- 18 November 1676: Richard Drury, of Somersham, Hunts.
- 15 November 1677: Charles Baron, of Little Eversden, Cambs.
- 14 November 1678: Thomas Wiseman, of Whittlesea, Isle of Ely
- 13 November 1679: William Harlock
- 1679: Hugh Bonfoy, of Abbots Ripton, Hunts.
- 4 November 1680: Sir Thomas Sclater, 1st Baronet, of Catley, Cambs.
- 10 November 1681: Sir Robert Swayne
- 17 November 1681: Robert Swaine, of Leverington, Isle of Ely
- 13 November 1682: John Bigg, of Grafham, Hunts.
- 12 November 1683: Sir Henry Pickering, of Whaddon, Cambs.
- 20 November 1684: Samuel Fortrey, of Byall House, Isle of Ely
- 30 November 1685: Peter Pheasant
- 7 December 1685: Sir John Hewet, 3rd Baronet, of Hunts.
- 25 November 1686: Sir George Downing, 2nd Baronet, of Gamlingay, Cambs.
- 23 January 1687: Sir Robert Cotton, of Hatley St George, Cambs.
- 8 November 1688: Sir Robert Bernard, 3rd Baronet
- 17 November 1688: Henry Kingsley
- 18 March 1689: James Torkington, of Great Stukeley, Hunts.
- 18 November 1689: Felix Calvert
- 25 November 1689: William Calvert, of Childerley, Cambs.
- 27 November 1690: Nicholas Mallabar, of Ely, Isle of Ely
- 14 December 1691: Sir John Marshall
- 21 December 1691: Sir Robert Dacres
- 31 December 1691: Sir Robert Bernard, 3rd Baronet, of Brampton, Hunts.
- 17 November 1692: Robert Swann, of Hawkston cum Newton, Cambs.
- 16 November 1693: William Tanner, of the Isle of Ely
- 6 December 1694: Arthur Joscelyne, of Stapleford, Cambs.
- 5 December 1695: Granado Piggott, of Abington Pigotts, Hunts.
- 3 December 1696: Thomas Harrison, of March, Isle of Ely
- 16 December 1697: Erasmus Smith
- 23 December 1697: Robert Tompson, of Stanground, Hunts.
- 22 December 1698: William Eversden of Great Eversden, Cambs.
- 20 November 1699: Richard Read
- 23 November 1699: Richard Parlett Read, of Chatteris, Isle of Ely

== 1700–1799 ==
- 28 November 1700: Lawrence Blatt, of Somersham, Hunts.
- 1 January 1702: Edward Nightingale, of Kneesworth, Cambs.
- 3 December 1702: Sir Roger Jenyns, of Ely, Isle of Ely
- 2 December 1703: Sir John Marshall
- 20 December 1703: Francis Tyssen, of Offord D'Arcy, Hunts.
- 21 December 1704: John Bromley, of Horseheath, Cambs.
- 3 December 1705: John Walsham, of March, Isle of Ely
- 14 November 1706: Burrell Massingberd, of Hunts.
- 20 November 1707: Ralph Lane, of Woodbury House, Gamlingay, Cambs.
- 29 November 1708: Edward Partridge
- 13 December 1708: John Jenyns, of Doddington, Isle of Ely
- 18 December 1709: Robert Pigott, of Chesterton, Hunts.
- 24 November 1710: Thomas Cotton, of Connington, Cambs.
- 13 December 1711: Joseph Taylor, of Wisbech, Isle of Ely
- 11 December 1712: Edmund Glenister, of Royston, Cambs.
- 30 November 1713: Roger Rant
- 13 December 1713: Roger Pepys, of Impington, Hunts.
- 1714 John Marshall, jun. of Wisbech, Isle of Ely.
- 22 November 1715: Sir John Conyers, 1st Baronet, of Great Staughton, Hunts.
- 12 November 1716: Christopher Jefferson
- 6 December 1716: Maximilian Westerne, of Great Abington, Cambs.
- 21 December 1717: Roger Laxon, of Whittlesea, Cambs.
- 21 December 1718: Stephen Baseley, of Houghton, Hunts.
- 3 December 1719: Daniel Waite, of Toft, Cambs.
- 3 January 1721: Edward Partheriche, of Ely, Isle of Ely
- 14 December 1721 Martin Lacy, of Fenstanton, Hunts.
- 11 December 1722: Thomas Bendish
- 20 December 1722: Samuel Symonds Pepys
- December 1722: James Church, of Shelford, Cambs.
- 1723 T. Jenkinson of Elm.
- 7 January 1724: Thomas Jenkinson, of Elm, Isle of Ely
- 10 December 1724: Charles Green, of St Ives, Hunts.
- 13 January 1726: Sir Thomas Hatton, 6th Baronet, of Long Stanton, Cambs.
- 29 November 1726: William Whinn, of Mepal, Isle of Ely
- 16 December 1727: Roger Thompson, of Hunts.
- 18 December 1728: Samuel Symonds Pepys, of Cambridge, Cambs.
- 18 December 1729: James Anthony, of Wisbech, Isle of Ely
- 14 December 1730: Jasper Lister, of Somersham, Hunts.
- 9 December 1731: Walter Serocold, of Cherry Hinton, Cambs.
- 14 December 1732: George Waddington, of Doddington, Isle of Ely
- 10 January 1734: William Thompson the younger, of Somersham, Hunts.
- 9 January 1735: Richard Daston, of Isleham, Cambs.
- 18 December 1735: Jeremiah Riss, of Thorney, Isle of Ely
- 19 January 1737: William Mitchell, of Hemingford Grey, Hunts.
- 14 January 1738: Richard Hitch, of Duxford, Cambs.
- 21 December 1738: Robert Colvile, of Newton, Isle of Ely
- 27 December 1739: John Cole, of Fenton, Hunts.
- 24 December 1740: Chester Perne, of Little Abington, Cambs.
- 31 December 1741: Dingley Askham, of Conington, Cambs.
- 16 December 1742: Sir Thomas Peyton, 3rd Baronet, of Great Raveley, Hunts.
- 5 January 1744: Thomas Watson Ward, of Wilbraham, Cambs.
- 10 January 1745: Robert Gill of Upwell, Isle of Ely
- 16 January 1746: Thomas Houghton, of St Ives, Hunts.
- 15 January 1747: John Godfrey, of Brinkley, Cambs.
- 14 January 1748: John Partheriche, of Littleport, Isle of Ely
- 11 January 1749: Peter Standley, of Little Paxton, Hunts.
- 17 January 1750: Best Pearse, of Hatley St George, Cambs.
- 6 December 1750: John Sumpter, of Walsoken, Isle of Ely
- 14 January 1752: Richard Astell, of Everton-cum-Tetworth, Hunts.
- 31 January 1753: Sir Samuel Clarke, 3rd Baronet
- 7 February 1754: Henry Southwell, of Wisbech, Isle of Ely
- 29 January 1755: William Mitchell, of Hemingford, Hunts.
- 27 January 1756: Charles Pepys, of Impington, Cambs.
- 4 February 1757: Francis Dixon, of Upwell, Isle of Ely
- 27 January 1758: John Jackson, of Godmanchester, Hunts.
- 2 February 1759: George Montgomerie, of Fordham
- 1 February 1760: Sir Philip Vavazor, of Wisbech, Isle of Ely
- 28 January 1761: John Hagar, of Waresley, Hunts.
- 15 February 1762: Richard Cropp, of Castle Camps, Cambs.
- 4 February 1763: Isaac Young, of Wisbech, Isle of Ely
- 1 June 1763: John Garland, of Wisbech, Isle of Ely
- 10 February 1764: Edward Martin the younger, of Fenstanton, Hunts.
- 1 February 1765: Thomas Cockayne, of Soham, Cambs.
- 17 February 1766: John Goddard, of Elm, Isle of Ely
- 13 February 1767: John Heathcote, of Great Stukeley, Hunts.
- 15 January 1768: Edward Leeds, of Croxton, Cambs.
- 27 January 1769: James Collier, of March, Isle of Ely
- 9 February 1770: Lancelot Brown, of Fenstanton, Hunts.
- 6 February 1771: Christopher Anstey, of Trumpington, Cambs.
- 17 February 1772: John Waddington, of Ely, Isle of Ely
- 8 February 1773: Sir Charles Cope, 2nd Baronet, of Orton-cum-Bottlebridge, Hunts.
- 7 February 1774: John Hitch, of Melbourn, Cambs.
- 6 February 1775: Daniel Swaine, of Leverington, Isle of Ely
- 5 February 1776: Richard Reynolds, of Little Paxton, Hunts.
- 31 January 1777: Christopher Jeaffreson, of Dullingham, Cambs.
- 28 January 1778: Christopher Potter, of Ely, Isle of Ely
- 1 February 1779: William Fellowes, of Ramsey Abbey, Hunts.
- 2 February 1780: Thomas Rumbold Hall, of Hildersham, Cambs.
- 5 February 1781: John Johnson, of Leverington, Isle of Ely
- 1 February 1782: Henry Poynter Standly, of Little Paxton, Hunts.
- 10 February 1783: William Vachell, of Hinxton, Cambs.
- 9 February 1784: Thomas Shepheard, of March, Isle of Ely
- 18 February 1785: John Crichloe Turner, of Great Stukeley, Hunts.
- 13 February 1786: John Drage, of Soham, Cambs.
- 12 February 1787: William Camps, of Wilburton, Isle of Ely
- 8 February 1788: Eustace Kentish, of Kings Ripton, Hunts.
- 9 April 1789: Thomas Panton, of Fen Ditton, Cambs.
- 12 February 1790: Thomas Ground, of Whittlesea, Isle of Ely
- 4 February 1791: George Thornhill, of Diddington, Hunts.
- 3 February 1792: Richard Greaves Townley, of Fulbourn, Cambs.
- 6 February 1793: Thomas Cole, of Doddington, Isle of Ely
- 19 February 1794: John Richards, of Brampton, Hunts.
- 11 February 1795: Thomas Quinton, of Hatley St George, Cambs.
- 5 February 1796: John Gardiner, of Chatteris, Isle of Ely
- 1 February 1797: William Waller, of Chesterton, Cambs.
- 7 February 1798: John Tharpe, of Chippenham, Cambs.
- 8 February 1799: John Westwood, of Chatteris, Isle of Ely

== 1800–1899 ==
- 5 February 1800: Richard Hetley, of Alwalton, Hunts.
- 12 February 1801: Richard Eaton, of Stetchworth, Cambs.
- 3 February 1802: Thomas Aveling, of Whittlesea, Isle of Ely
- 3 February 1803: Sir James Duberley, of Gaynes Hall
- 1 February 1804: Benjamin Keene, of Westoe Lodge, Hunts.
- 6 February 1805: John Marshall, of Elm, Isle of Ely
- 1 February 1806: Lawrence Reynolds, of Stirtloe
- 4 February 1807: William Squire, of Knapwell, Cambs.
- 3 February 1808: Sir Henry Peyton, 2nd Baronet, of Emneth, Cambs.
- 6 February 1809: John Heathcote, of Conington Castle, Cambs.
- 31 January 1810: George William Leeds, of Croxton, Cambs.
- 8 February 1811: William Dunn Gardner, of Chatteris, Isle of Ely
- 24 January 1812: John Carstairs, of Woodhurst, Hunts.
- 10 February 1813: Charles Madryll Cheere, of Papworth Everard, Cambs.
- 4 February 1814: Jonathan Page, of Ely, Isle of Ely
- 13 February 1815: Knight Cook George Mitchell, of Hemingford Grey
- 24 February 1815: Robert Booth, of Alconbury, Hunts.
- 12 February 1816: John Whitby Quintin, of Hatley St George, Cambs.
- 1 March 1817: Thomas Spooner, of Hill House, Isle of Ely
- 19 February 1818: Thomas George Apreece, of Washingley, Hunts.
- 10 February 1819: John Hall, of West Wratting, Cambs.
- 12 February 1820: Thomas Burges, of Benwick
- 6 February 1821: John Pasheller, of Godmanchester
- 4 February 1822: Robert Jones Adeane, of Babraham
- 31 January 1823: William Rayner, of Wisbech
- 31 January 1824: George Thomson, of Somersham
- 2 February 1825: Sir Charles Ethelston Nightingale, 11th Baronet, of Kneesworth
- 30 January 1826: Thomas Skeels Fryer, of Chatteris
- 5 February 1827: John Margetts of St Ives
- 13 February 1828: John Peter Allix, of Swaffham Prior
- 11 February 1829: Richard Orton, of Upwell
- 2 February 1830: John Guillum Scott, of Somersham
- 31 January 1831: John Bendyshe, of Kneesworth
- 6 February 1832: Thomas Page, of Ely
- 1833: Denzil Onslow, of Great Staughton
- 1834: Richard Huddleston, of Sawston
- 1835: John Fryer, of Chatteris
- 1836: George Thornhill, of Diddington
- 1837: John Dobede, of Soham
- 1838: William Layton, of Woodhouse Ely
- 1839: Sir Richard Hussey Hussey, of the Views, Wood Walton, Huntingdon
- 1840: Thomas Mortlock, of Little Abington
- 1841: Joseph Marshall, of Elm, Cambridgeshire
- 1842: John Linton, of Stirtloe
- 1843: Edward Humphrys Greene, of Hinxton
- 1844: Robert Hutchinson Lewin, of March
- 1845: John Bonfoy Rooper, of Abbots Ripton Hall
- 1846: Sir Charles Watson, 2nd Baronet, of West Wratting
- 1847: Robert Francis Pate, of Wisbech
- 1848: John Moyer Heathcote, of Conington Castle
- 1849: Ebenezer Foster, of Trumpington, Cambridgeshire
- 1850: John Vipan, of Sutton
- 1851: George Rust, of Huntingdon
- 1852: William Parker Hamond, of Pampisford
- 1853: William Whitting, of Manea and Thorney Abbey
- 1854: George William Rowley, of the Priory, St. Neots
- 1855: Sir Williamson Booth, 2nd Baronet, of Gamlingay
- 1856: James Gay, of Upwell
- 1857: Sir John Henry Pelly, 2nd Baronet, of Warnham Court
- 1858: Christopher Robert Pemberton, of Newton
- 1859: John Dunn Gardner, of Chatteris
- 1860: Philip Castell Sherard, 9th Baron Sherard, of Glatton
- 1861: Edward Hicks, of Great Wilbraham
- 1862: John Richardson Fryer, of Chatteris
- 1863: Denzil Onslow, of Great Staughton
- 1864: George Onslow Newton, of Croxton Park
- 1865: John Hall, of Ely
- 1866: Octavius Duncombe of Waresley
- 1867: Stanlake Ricketts Batson, of Horseheath
- 1868: George Ebenezer Foster, of Brooklands, Cambridge, and Shippea Manor, Isle of Ely
- 1869: George Thornhill, of Diddington
- 1870: Richard Archer Houblon, of Bartlow House
- 1871: Thomas Richards, of Wimblington, Isle of Ely
- 1872: George Fitzwilliam of Milton Park, Northamptonshire
- 1873: Sidney Stanley of Longstowe Hall
- 1874: James Montagu, of Elm, Isle of Ely, and Melton-on-the Hill, Doncaster
- 1875: William Wells of Holmewood Hall
- 1876: Charles Isham Strong, of Thorpe Hall, Peterborough
- 1877: John Brown, of Elwyn Orchard, March
- 1878: Richard Hussey Hussey, of Upvvood, Huntingdonshire
- 1879: William Parker Hamond, of Pampisford Hall
- 1880: Robert Charles Catling, of Needham Hall, Elm, Wisbech
- 1881: Thomas Coote, of Oaklands, Fenstanton,
- 1882: Ebenezer Bird Foster of Anstey Hall, Trumpington
- 1883: Henry Pearson Crates, of the Vineyard, Peterborough
- 1884: William Duberley of Gaynes Hall, Kimbolton
- 1885: John Carbery Evans, of Hatley Park, St. Neots
- 1886: Thomas Maylin Vipan, of Button House, Sutton
- 1887: Henry Charles Geldart, of Waldcn House, Huntingdon
- 1888: John James Briscoe of Bourn Hall
- 1889: Thomas Richards Harding, of Coney House, Doddington
- 1890: Sir Arthur Wellington Marshall, of the Towers, Buckden
- 1891: William Henry Hall, of Six Mile Bottom, Newmarket
- 1892: Henry Sharpe, of Leverington
- 1893: Arthur John Thornhill, of Diddington Hall, Buckden
- 1894: Maj. Edward Henry Greene-de-Freville, of Hinxton Hall
- 1895: Frederic Nathan Sharpe, of Wisbech
- 1896: John Linton, of Stirtloe House, Buckden
- 1897: Ernest Terah Hooley, of Papworth Hall
- 1898: Fred Crisp, of Whitehouse, New Southgate, Middlesex, and Dry Drayton, Cambridgeshire
- 1899: Walter Henry Octavius Duncombe, of Waresley Park, St. Neots

== 1900–1965 ==
- 1900: Charles Finch Foster of Pinehurst, Cambridge
- 1901: Thomas Walter Harding, of Kirkstall Abbey, Leeds, and Doddington, Cambridge
- 1902: Charles Harold Coote, of Houghton Grange, Huntingdonshire
- 1903: James Binney, of Pampisford Hall, Pampisford
- 1904: Arthur Hall, of Ely
- 1905: George Wright Wright-Ingle, of Woodhouse, North Finchley, Middlesex
- 1906: Sir Charles Edward Hamilton, Bt., of Hatley Park, Hatley St. George, Cambs.
- 1907: William Cutlack, of The Grange, Littleport
- 1908: John Ashton Fielden, of Holme Wood, near Peterborough
- 1909: George Douglas Cochrane Newton of Croxton Park
- 1910: Walter Wooll West, of Needham Hall, Elm, Wisbech
- 1911: Howard Coote, of Stukeley Hall, Huntingdon
- 1912: Sidney Wynn Graystone, of The White Lodge, Broad Green, Cheveley, near Newmarket
- 1913: Frank Mills, of Wisbech
- 1914: John Henry Beeby, of The Gables, Peterborough
- 1915: Alfred Russell Fordham, of Melbourn Bury near Royston
- 1916: Alfred Edwin Wright, of Ivy Lodge, Haddenham
- 1917: John Norman Heathcote, of Conington Castle, Peterborough
- 1918: Sir Herbert George Fordham, of Odsey, Ashwell, Baldock, Herts
- 1919: Lancelot Harold Luddington, of The Chantrey, Ely
- 1920: Alfred Jordan, of Wistaria House, Huntingdon Street, St. Neots
- 1921: James Odell Vinter, of Southfield, Cambridge
- 1922: Sir Charles Walston, of Newton Hall, Newton, Cambridge
- 1923: Douglas James Proby of Elton Hall, Peterborough
- 1924: George Ralph Cunliffe Foster, of Anstey Hall, Trumpington, Cambridge
- 1925: Harold Fred Martin Peatling, of Leverington Hall, Wisbech
- 1926: Arthur George Dilley, of The Walks, Huntingdon
- 1927: Mowbray Frederick Vivian James Arthur Webber, of Wimbish Manor, Shepreth, Cambridgeshire.
- 1928: Hugh Abinger Whittome, of Shortacres, Peterborough
- 1929: Major Sir Lionel Cecil William Alexander, of The Grange, Hemingford Abbots, St. Ives, Hunts
- 1930: Sir Charles Wentworth Stanley, of Bentley Corner, Trumpington Road, Cambridge
- 1931: Sir Frederick Hiam of Cambridge
- 1932: Major-General Sir Borlase Elward Wyndham Childs of Thriplow House, Cambs
- 1933: Henry Gage Spicer, of " Holmwood", Sawston, Cambridge
- 1934: Col. William Philip Cutlack, of Whewell House, Cambridge
- 1935: Granville Proby, of Elton Hall, Hunts.
- 1936: William Warburton Pemberton, of Trumpington Hall, Cambridgeshire
- 1937: Thomas Peake, of Wellington Street, Littleport, Ely
- 1938: Major Sir Wiliam Prescott, of Godmanchester, Huntingdonshire
- 1939: Sir Harold William Stannus Gray of Gog Magog Hills, Babraham, Cambridgeshire
- 1940: Arthur Herbert Carter of Tydd St Giles, Wisbech
- 1941: Noel Thornhill, of Diddington Hall, Buckden, Huntingdon
- 1942: Lieut.-Col. Roger Henry Parker, of Thorneycreek, Cambridge
- 1943: Lieut.-Col. John William Arthur Ollard, of Petercroft, North Brink, Wisbech, Cambs
- 1944: Joseph Stephenson, of 19, Broadway Gardens, Peterborough
- 1945: Sir Stephen Gerald Howard of The Moat, Upend, Kirtling
- 1946: Leonard Childs of Chatteris, Cambridgeshire
- 1947: Colonel Charles William Dell Rowe, of Orton Longueville, near Peterborough
- 1948: Geoffrey Odell Vinter, of Manor House, Thriplow, Cambs
- 1949: Arthur Davis Burton, of Askham House, Doddington
- 1950: Major Reuben Llewelyn Farley, of Wornditch Hall, Kimbolton, Hunts
- 1951: Captain William Henry Ockleston, of Church Farm, Caxton, Cambs
- 1952: Walter Stewart Elgood, of Brewery House, North Brink, Wisbech, Cambs
- 1953: Joseph Hugh Leycester, of Wheatfield House, Hilton, Hunts
- 1954: Lieut-Colonel John Clement Wolstan Francis, of Quy Hall, Cambridge.
- 1955: William Guy Ruston, of Norden House, New Road, Chatteris, Cambs
- 1956: Francis Arthur Perkins, of Alwalton Hall, Peterborough.
- 1957: Edward Granville Gordon Frost, of 29, Barrow Road, Cambridge.
- 1958: William Ruane, of The Lomonds, Cambridge Road, Ely.
- 1959: Edward Palmer Brand, of Hazeldene, Bury Road, Ramsey.
- 1960: Miles Crawford Burkitt, of Merton House, Grantchester.
- 1961: Arthur Samuel Rickwood, of Victoria House, Chatteris.
- 1962: Francis John Shipley Ellas, of The Pump House, Elton.
- 1963: Colonel Geoffrey Taylor Hurrell, of Harston, Cambridge.
- 1964: James Brian Bamford, of 24 St. Mary's Street, Ely.
- 1965 onwards: See High Sheriff of Cambridgeshire and Isle of Ely and High Sheriff of Huntingdon and Peterborough

== Bibliography ==
- Carter, Edmund (1819). Upcott, William (ed.). The history of the county of Cambridge, from the earliest account to the present time. London: S. & R. Bentley. p. 353.
- Hughes, A. (1898). List of Sheriffs for England and Wales from the Earliest Times to A.D. 1831. London: Eyre & Spottiswoode. (with amendments of 1963, Public Record Office)
- The History of the Worthies of England Volume 1
