= John Cotton =

John Cotton may refer to:

== Politicians ==
- John Cotton (fl. 1379–88), MP for Cambridge 1379–1388
- John Cotton (MP died 1593) (1513–1593), MP for Cambridgeshire 1553, 1554
- John Cotton (MP died 1620/21) (1543–1620/21), MP for Cambridgeshire 1593
- Sir John Cotton, 2nd Baronet, MP for Cambridge 1689–90, 1696, 1705
- John Cotton (1671–1736), MP for Westminster 1722
- Sir John Hynde Cotton, 3rd Baronet (1686–1752), English Jacobite MP for Cambridge 1708–22,1727–41, for Cambridgeshire 1722–27, and for Marlborough 1741–52
- Sir John Cotton, 3rd Baronet, of Connington (1621–1702), MP for Huntingdon 1661 and Huntingdonshire 1685
- Sir John Hynde Cotton, 4th Baronet (c. 1717–1795), MP for St Germans 1741–47, Marlborough 1752–61, and Cambridgeshire 1764–80
- Sir John Cotton, 4th Baronet, of Connington (c. 1680–1731), MP for Huntingdon 1705 and Huntingdonshire 1710–13

== Sportsmen ==
- John Cotton (baseball) (born 1970), retired professional baseball player
- John Cotton (cricketer) (born 1940), English cricketer
- John Cotton (footballer) (1930–2015), footballer for Crewe Alexandra and Stoke City

== Others ==
- Johannes Cotto or John Cotton (12th century), author of a treatise on music
- John Cotton (minister) (1585–1652), American religious leader
- John Cotton (ornithologist) (1801–1849), British and Australian artist and ornithologist
- John Cotton (author), author of a treatise on music
- John G. Cotton (born 1951), US Navy admiral
- Jack Cotton (1903–1964), British entrepreneur
- John Cotton (architect) (1844–1934), British architect to whom Frank Worthington Simon was articled

== See also ==
- Jon Cotton, record producer
