= Denzil Onslow =

Denzil Onslow may refer to:

- Denzil Onslow of Pyrford (c. 1642–1721), British politician, Member of Parliament for several constituencies
- Denzil Onslow of Stoughton (c. 1698–1765), British politician, Member of Parliament for Guildford
- Denzil Onslow (British Army officer) (1770–1838), general in the British Army and amateur cricketer
- Denzil Onslow Jr (1802–1879), English cricketer, and son of the above
- Denzil Onslow (Conservative politician) (1839–1908), British politician, Member of Parliament for Guildford
