= Sir John Peyton, 1st Baronet =

English politician

Sir John Peyton, 1st Baronet (1561 – December 1616) was an English politician who sat in the House of Commons at various times between 1593 and 1611.

== Biography ==
Peyton was the eldest surviving son of Robert Peyton of Isleham and his wife, Elizabeth Rich, daughter of Richard Rich, 1st Baron Rich of Rochford Hall and Leigh's Priory, Essex. He was a justice of the peace (J.P.) for the Isle of Ely from about 1584. He succeeded to the family estates on the death of his father in 1590. From about 1591, he was a JP for Cambridgeshire.

In 1593, he was elected member of parliament for Cambridgeshire. He was High Sheriff of Cambridgeshire and Huntingdonshire from 1593 to 1594. He became deputy lieutenant in 1596 and was knighted on 1 November 1596. In 1604, he was elected again as MP for Cambridgeshire. He was created baronet on 22 May 1611.

Peyton died at the age of 56 and was buried at Isleham on 19 December 1616.

== Family ==
Peyton married Alice Osborne, daughter of Sir Edward Osborne, Lord Mayor of London, of St. Dionis Backchurch, London in 1580 and had six sons and five daughters. He was succeeded in the baronetcy by his son Edward. Their daughter, Frances Peyton, was mother of Sir John Hobart, 3rd Baronet.

Parliament of England
Preceded by John North (Sir) Francis Hynde	Member of Parliament for Cambridgeshire; 1593–1597; With: John Cotton	Succeeded by (Sir) Henry North; William Hynde
Preceded by Sir John Cutts; John Cotton	Member of Parliament for Cambridgeshire; 1604–1614; With: Sir John Cutts	Succeeded by Sir John Cutts; Thomas Chicheley
Baronetage of England
New creation	Baronet (of Isleham); 1611–1616	Succeeded by Edward Peyton
