= Robert Peyton =

Bob or Robert Peyton may refer to:

- Sir Robert Peyton of Isleham (before 1453–1518), English founder of Peyton baronets line
- Robert Peyton (MP died 1550) (before 1498–1550), English MP for Cambridgeshire
- Robert Peyton (MP died 1590) (before 1523–1590), English MP for Cambridgeshire
- Sir Robert Peyton (Middlesex MP), English Knight of the Shire of Middlesex 1679–1685
- Robert Ludwell Yates Peyton (1822–1863), American Confederate senator from Missouri
- Robert Peyton (actor) (1912–1993), American film and TV performer a/k/a Lee Frederick
- Bob Peyton (born 1964), English footballer

== See also ==
- Robert Payton (disambiguation)
