= John Cutts (died 1646) =

English politician

Sir John Cutts (c.1581–June 1646) was an English politician who sat in the House of Commons variously between 1604 and 1640.

== Life ==
Cutts was the son of Sir John Cutts of Childerley, who was keeper of the park at Somersham. His mother was Margaret Brocket, daughter of Sir John Brocket of Brocket Hall in Hatfield, Hertfordshire. Cutts was educated at Queen Elizabeth grammar school in Barnet, Hertfordshire.

In 1598 he was sent to work in the British Embassy in Paris. Home in England he is chiefly remembered for razing the villages of Great and Little Childerley to make way for a deer park (which was seen as an "improvement").

Cutts was knighted at the Charterhouse on 11 May 1603

Cutts was a Justice of the Peace in Cambridge 1614 to 1616. Thereafter he held some unusual posts many of which relate to birds or agriculture: commander of swan upping in Cambridge; oyer and terminer for Norfolk; commander of bridges in Cambridge; commander of sewers in the Great Fens; commander of enclosures; delivery of gaols for Cambridge and Ely; preservation of the royal game birds; collector of the Privy Seal loan; receiver of the Fen Drainage tax; commander of the poll tax for Cambridgeshire; collector of Irish aid for Cambridgeshire; sequestrator of delinquents.

In 1604 Cutts was elected Member of Parliament for Cambridgeshire and was re-elected in 1614. In 1615 he was awarded an honorary MA at Cambridge University on the visit of King James I. He was High Sheriff of Cambridgeshire and Huntingdonshire in 1619. In 1621 Cutts was re-elected MP for Cambridgeshire and was elected again in 1624, 1625 and 1626. He was appointed Custos Rotulorum of Cambridgeshire from 1621 to 1636. He was last elected MP for Cambridgeshire in April 1640 in the Short Parliament.

Cutts lived at Childerley and died in June 1646 and was buried in the family vault at Swavesey. After his death in 1646 (buried July 1646) his widow Anne controlled the whole estate until their son John came of age in around 1655. Charles I spent the night at Childerley on 6–7 June 1647 when he was brought by Cromwell's soldiers after being captured at Holdenby Hall, in Northamptonshire.

== Family ==
Cutts married twice.Firstly in March 1632 to Anne Kempe daughter of Sir Thomas Kempe of Olantigh in Wye, Kent. Anne died in childbirth later the same year. In December 1632 he married Anne Weld (d.1659), daughter of Sir John Weld of St Olave, Old Jewry, London, on 13 December 1632. They had sons John who was created a baronet in 1661 and Henry.

Parliament of England
Preceded by Sir John Cutts; Sir John Cotton	Member of Parliament for Cambridgeshire; 1604–1626; With: Sir John Peyton, 1st Baronet 1604–1614; Thomas Chicheley 1614; Sir Edward Peyton, 2nd Baronet 1621; Sir Simon Steward 1624; Sir Edward Peyton, 2nd Baronet 1624–1626	Succeeded by Sir Miles Sandys, 1st Baronet; Sir John Carlton
Vacant Parliament suspended since 1629	Member of Parliament for Cambridgeshire; 1640; With: Sir Dudley North	Succeeded by Sir Dudley North; Thomas Chicheley
