= Thomas Peyton (died 1484) =

Sheriff of Cambridgeshire and Huntingdonshire

Thomas Peyton (1418–1484), 1485 stained glass window in Long Melford Church, Suffolk

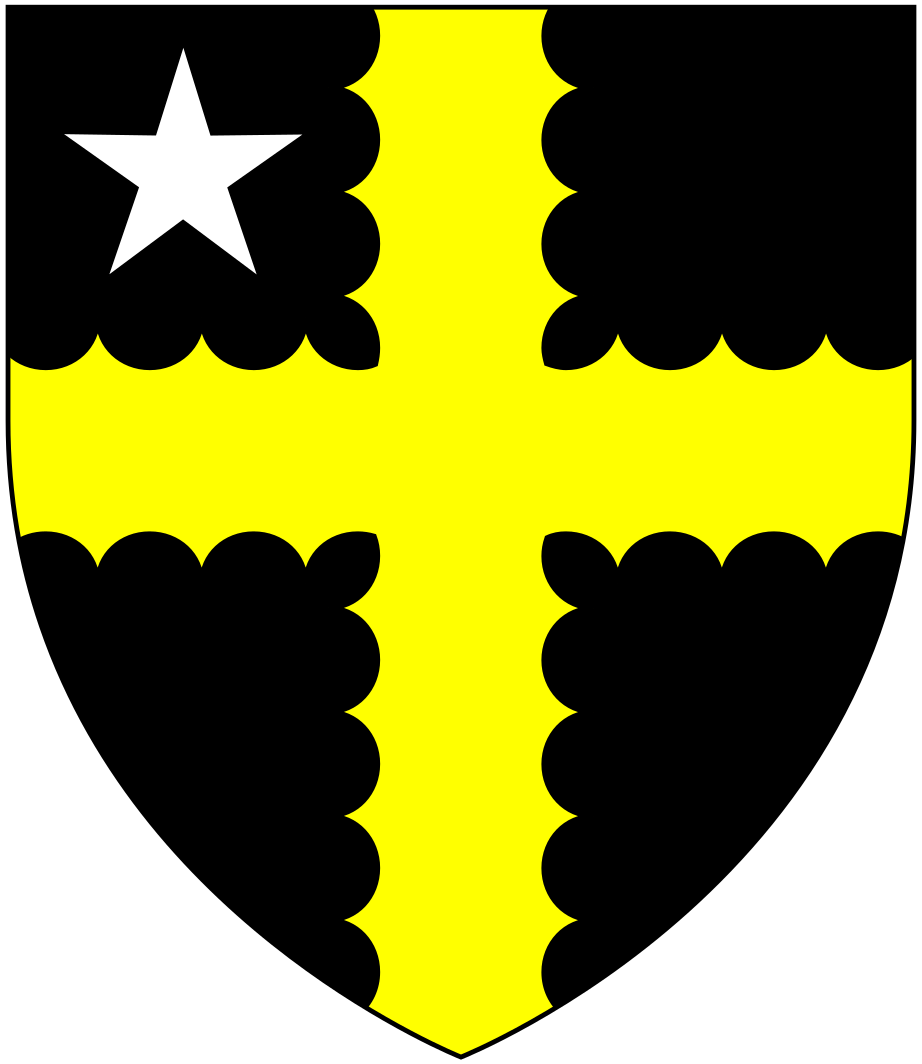
Arms of Peyton: Sable, a cross engrailed or a mullet in the first quarter argent

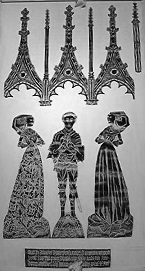
Monumental brass of Thomas Peyton (1418–1484) with his two wives, on top of his chest tomb in the chancel of Isleham Church

Thomas Peyton (1418–1484) of Isleham, Cambridgeshire, was twice Sheriff of Cambridgeshire and Huntingdonshire, in 1443 and 1453. He rebuilt the church of St Andrew's in Isleham, in the chancel of which survives his monumental brass. He is depicted in a 1485 stained glass window in Long Melford Church, Suffolk, where he displays on his surcoat the Peyton arms: Sable, a cross engrailed or a mullet in the first quarter argent.

== Origins ==
His family originated at the manor of Peyton in the parish of Boxford, Suffolk.

== Marriage ==
Peyton married twice. His first wife was Margaret Bernard, one of the daughters and co-heiresses of Sir John Bernard (died 1451) (whose effigy survives in Isleham Church), lord of the manor of Isleham, through which marriage he inherited that manor. By Margaret Bernard he had children including:

- Thomas Peyton (died 1484), who predeceased his father, having married Jane Calthorpe, heiress of Calthorpe in Norfolk, by whom he had children including:
  - Sir Robert Peyton (died 1518), heir to his grandfather, whose monument is also in Isleham Church, and from whom the three Peyton baronets were descended. His son Sir Robert Peyton (died 1550) married Frances Hazelden (died 1580), who in her widowhood and one year before her death founded the Peyton Hospital in Isleham.
  - John Peyton
  - Edward Peyton
  - Elizabeth Peyton, wife of Edward Langley of Knowlton in Kent.
  - Jane Peyton, wife of John Langley of Lowleworth in Cambridgeshire
  - Anne Peyton
  - Dorothy Peyton

His second marriage was to Margaret Francis, a daughter and co-heiress of Sir Hugh Francis of Giffords in Suffolk, by whom he had further sons:

- Christopher Peyton (died 1499), whose monumental brass survives in Isleham Church. He was Sheriff of Cambridgeshire and Huntingdonshire in 1496. He married a daughter of Leonard Hide of Hide Hall in Hertfordshire, but died without children. An inscription on the wall-plate of the roof of Isleham Church states: "Pray for the good prosperite of Crystofor Peyton and Elizabeth his wife and for the soul of Thomas Peyton squire and Margaret his wife fader and moder of the said Crystofor Peyton and for the souls of all the Awncestre of the said Crystofor Peyton Qwych dyd mak this rofe in the year of our lord MCCCCLXXXXV being the tenth year of King Henry the Seventh". (1495)
- Francis Peyton of St Edmundsbury in Suffolk and of Coggeshall in Essex, who married Elizabeth Brook, daughter of Reginald Brook of Aspallstoneham in Suffolk. By Elizabeth he had children including:
  - Christopher Peyton, eldest son and heir, of St Edmundsbury, who married Jane Mildmay, daughter of Thomas Mildmay. His eldest son was Thomas Peyton who married Lady Cecilia Bourchier, a daughter of John Bourchier, 2nd Earl of Bath (1499–1560/61) of Tawstock in Devon. Thomas and Cecilia had sons including:
    - Thomas Peyton, who married Dorothy Dowrich, a daughter of Walter Dowrich of Dowrich in the parish of Sandford in Devon by his wife Mary Carew (1550–1604), daughter of Dr. George Carew, Dean of Windsor, 3rd son of Sir Edmund Carew, Baron Carew, of Mohuns Ottery in the parish of Luppitt, Devon, and sister of George Carew, 1st Earl of Totnes (1555–1629). An image of Dorothy Dowrich below an escutcheon showing Peyton impaling Dowrich in included on the monumental brass of her mother Mary Carew in Sandford Church, Devon.
    - Sir Henry Peyton who married Lady Mary Seymour, a daughter of Edward Seymour, 1st Duke of Somerset, KG, (c. 1500 – 1552) Lord Protector of England from 1547 until 1549 during the minority of his nephew, King Edward VI (1547–1553) and the eldest brother of Queen Jane Seymour (died 1537), the third wife of King Henry VIII.
  - Edmund Peyton, Customer of Calais, died without children.

== Descendants ==
From him were descended the Peyton baronets of Isleham (1611), the Peyton baronets of Knowlton (1611) and the Peyton baronets of Doddington (1660 and later creations).
