= Robert Parys =

English Member of Parliament (died 1408)

Robert Parys (died 1408), of Hildersham, Cambridgeshire, was an English politician.

He was a Member (MP) of the Parliament of England for Cambridgeshire in September 1388 and was picked High Sheriff of Cambridgeshire and Huntingdonshire for 1386–87 and 1390–91.

He was Chamberlain of Chester and North Wales 6 May 1394 – 16 August 1399 (losing the post when Richard II was deposed), but he was reappointed late in 1399 under Henry IV and served until 1405. Parys Mountain is reputed to be named after him, after it was given to him by Henry IV.
