= Thomas Wendy (1614–1673) =

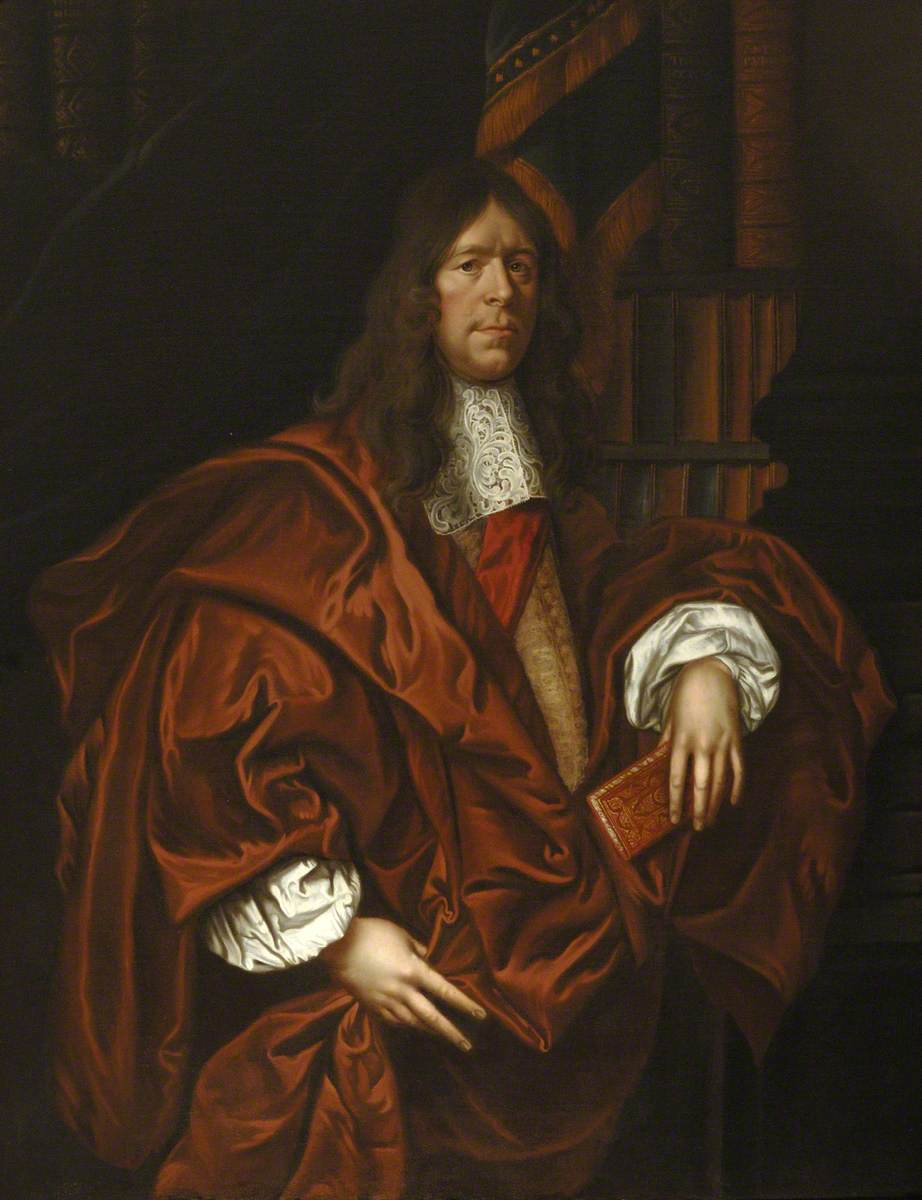
Image of Sir Thomas Wendy

Sir Thomas Wendy (8 February 1614 – 17 November 1673) was an English politician who sat in the House of Commons in 1660.

Wendy was the son of Francis Wendy. In 1629 he inherited the Haslingfield estate of his uncle Sir William Wendy. He was High Sheriff of Cambridgeshire and Huntingdonshire in 1638.

In 1660, Wendy was elected member of parliament for Cambridgeshire in the Convention Parliament. He was knighted in 1661. He was re-elected MP for Cambridgeshire in 1661 for the Cavalier Parliament and sat until his death.

Wendy made a collection of medals, optic glasses, and other rare items at Haslingfield Hall and also a considerable library. He brought a Danish savant called Simon Ertman back from his travels, who helped to found the parish school.

Wendy died childless, at the age of 59. He settled most of his estates, including Haslingfield, on his nephew Thomas Stewart, son of his sister Susan and Thomas Stewart of Barton Mills. His executors gave his library to Balliol College, Oxford.

Parliament of England
Preceded by Francis Russell	Member of Parliament for Cambridgeshire; 1660–1674; With: Isaac Thornton 1660; Thomas Chicheley 1661–1674	Succeeded by Sir Thomas Hatton, 2nd Baronet; Thomas Chicheley
