= Custos Rotulorum of Cambridgeshire =

This is a list of people who have served as Custos Rotulorum of Cambridgeshire. The office was created in 1368, at which time the Isle of Ely, Huntingdonshire and the Soke of Peterborough did not form part of the county.

- Sir John Hynde bef. 1544–1550
- Sir James Dyer bef. 1558 – aft. 1564
- Roger North, 2nd Baron North bef. 1573 – 1600
- Sir John Cotton 1600–1617
- Sir Edward Peyton, 2nd Baronet 1617–1618
- Sir John Cotton 1618–1621
- Sir John Cutts 1621–1636
- Sir Thomas Chicheley 1642–
- interregnum
- Sir Thomas Chicheley 1660–1689
- Edward Russell, 1st Earl of Orford 1689–1727

For later custodes rotulorum, see Lord Lieutenant of Cambridgeshire.
