= Arthur Wellington Marshall =

Colonel Sir Arthur Wellington Marshall DL (1841 - 1918) was High Sheriff of Cambridgeshire and Huntingdonshire in 1890. He commanded the Huntingdonshire militia, was made Knight Bachelor in 1898 and Mayor of Huntingdon in 1900.

== Life ==
Marshall was born in 1841, the son of James Marshall of Goldbeaters, Middlesex, and Catherine, daughter of Charles Morrison of Thurso. He was educated at St John's School, Leatherhead, and Trinity Hall, Cambridge. He served in the 5th King's Royal Rifles, commanded the Huntingdonshire militia, was knighted in 1898 and was High Sheriff of Cambridgeshire and Huntingdonshire in 1890. He was Mayor of Huntingdon in 1900.

Marshall married Constance, daughter of William Henry Desborough of Hartford, Huntingdonshire in 1867. They lived at Buckden Towers, Huntingdonshire and had three sons and one daughter. His wife predeceased him in 1915.
