= Robert Payton =

Robert Payton may refer to:

- Robert Payton Reid (1859–1945), Scottish academic painter
- Robert L. Payton (1926–2011), American jazz musician, writer, editor, academic and ambassador
- Bob Payton (1944–1994), American marketing man, restaurateur and hotelier

== See also ==
- Robert Peyton (disambiguation)
