= William Calthorpe =

15th-century English knight

Sir William Calthorpe KB
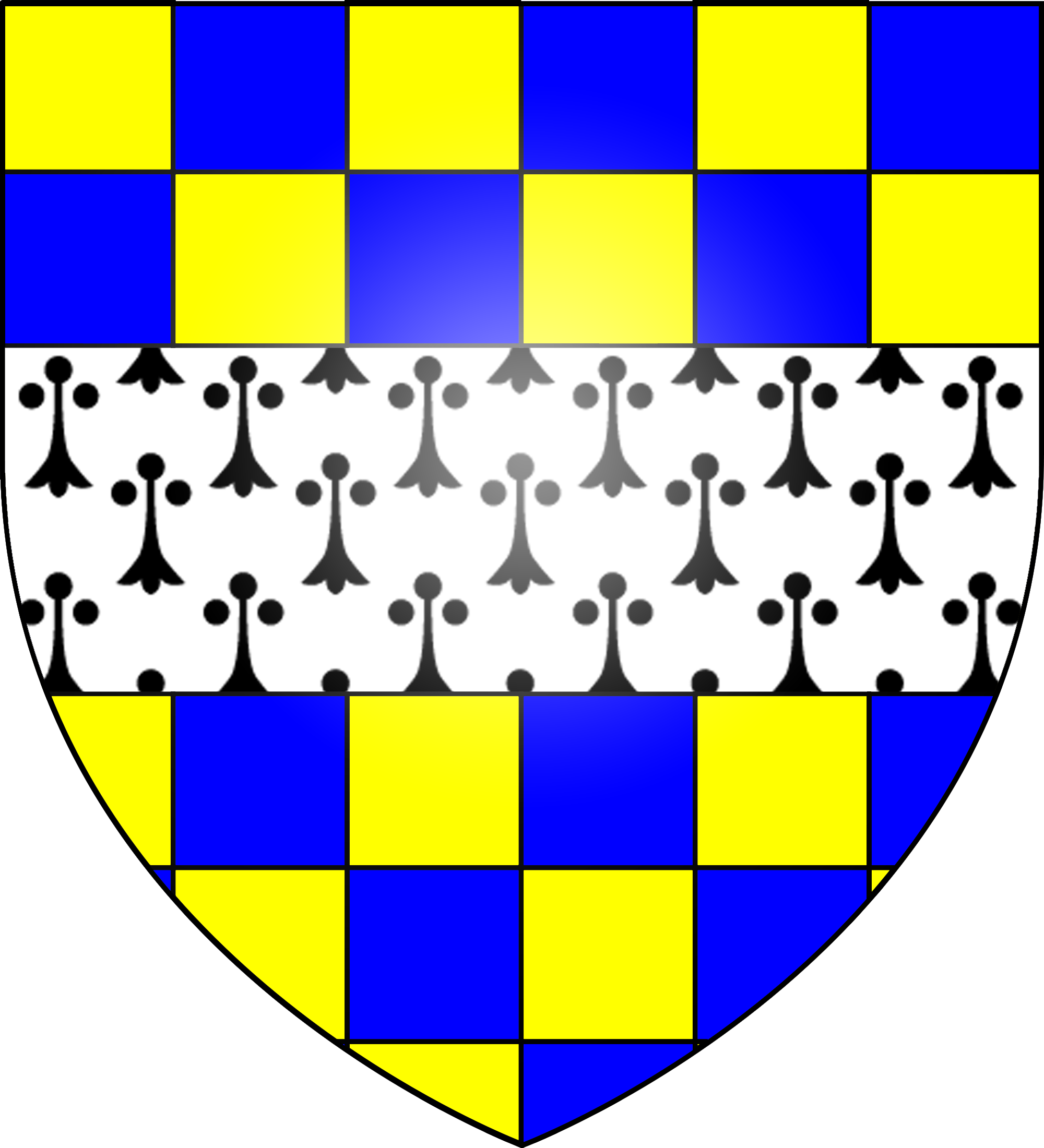
- Arms of Calthorpe: Chequy or and azure, a fess ermine
- Born: 30 January 1410; Burnham Thorpe, Norfolk
- Died: 15 November 1494 (aged 84)
- Buried: White Friars, Norwich
- Noble family: Calthorpe
- Spouses: Elizabeth de Grey and Ruthyn; Elizabeth Stapleton
- Father: Sir John Calthorpe
- Mother: Amy (Amice) Wythe

Sir William Calthorpe KB (30 January 1410 – 15 November 1494) was an English knight and Lord of the manors of Burnham Thorpe and Ludham in Norfolk. He is on record as High Sheriff of Norfolk and Suffolk in 1442, 1458 and 1464 and 1476.

== Family ==
Sir William Calthorpe was born on 30 January 1410 at Burnham Thorpe, in the English county of Norfolk. He was the son of Sir John Calthorpe and his wife Amy (Amice) Wythe.

His father died in the life of his own father, leaving William, who was found heir to his grandfather, and eleven years of age, in the 9th Henry V, 1421/2.

== Career ==
Sir William Calthorpe was a Norfolk sheep farmer. He became the heir to his grandfather's lands in 1431, and his children inherited the manor at Ingham, in north-east Norfolk. He is recorded on 28 June 1443, when he released one of his villeins, from serfdom and set him free from all future services.

He was a Member of Parliament, representing Norfolk from 1445 to 1446. He was sworn to the peace in Norfolk in 1434; the following year he was recorded as paying 10 marks rent for the farm of the church of Sculthorpe, Norfolk. He was among those thanked by the Council in connection with dealing with riots that took place in Norfolk in 1443. In 1448 he produced a charter of Henry III of England that granted free warren in Calthorpe to his ancestor William de Calthorpe.

He became locum tenens and Commissary-General to the late most noble and potent William, Duke of Norfolk, Earl of Pembroke, and Lord Great Chamberlain of England, Ireland and Aquitaine, during the minority of the Duke's son and heir, Henry, Earl of Exeter. In 1469, Sir William described himself as Sir William Calthorp of Ludham, a manor which he owned, as well as that of Burnham Thorpe. In 1479, he was Steward of the household of the Duke of Norfolk.

A Lancastrian, his arrest was ordered on 20 May 1450; he was pardoned in 1458. Calthorpe was made a Knight of the Bath in the Tower of London, by King Edward IV, on the Coronation of his Queen, Elizabeth Woodville, Ascension Day.

Calthorpe made Presentations to the Rectory of Beeston, Norfolk in 1460, 1481, 1492, and the Rectory of Hempstede in 1479 and 1485. He is on record as High Sheriff of Norfolk and Suffolk in 1442, 1458 and 1464 and 1476. He served as a Justice of the peace in Norfolk from 16 March to 24 November 1460; 4 July 1461 until becoming sheriff in 1463, 24 July 1466 until becoming sheriff in 1475, and from 28 June 1483 to 7 December 1485.

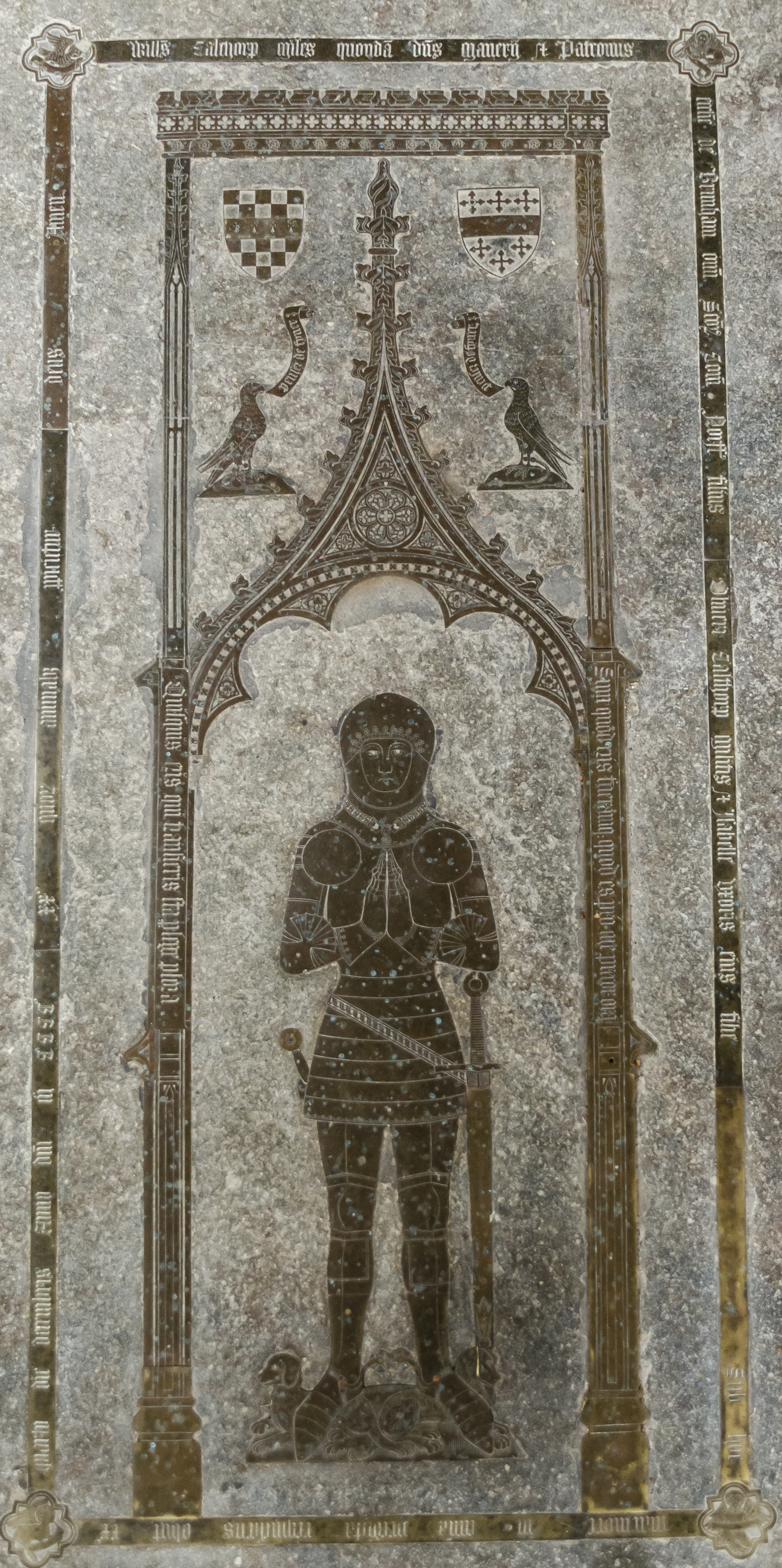
Brass to a certain Sir William Calthorpe (d.1420 / MCCCXX) in All Saints Church, Burnham Thorpe

In June 1469, he was "sworn one of my lord of Gloucester's men", but the following year was recorded as being a supporter of the Readeption of Henry VI. He was subsequently pardoned by the Yorkists on 8 February 1471, when he was given as being as "of Ingham, alias of Ludham, late sheriff". Similar documents name him on 12 December 1471 as being "of Norwich senior", and again in February 1473. He was a supporter of Richard III.

In the church of St. Martin at Palace, Norwich, is a tablet showing that in 1550 Lady Calthorp (Sir William's daughter-in-law) gave a silver cup and a velvet carpet to that church. It appears that the Calthorpes had their townhouse in this parish for many years, and Sir William Calthorp certainly lived there in 1492, and probably long before then, for it is recorded that in 1447 the Executors of Joan Lady Bardolph, sold the old seat of the Erpinghams, in St. Martin's at the Palace, to William Calthorp, Esq., and the receivership of the Erpingham manor was vested in Sir Philip Calthorp (d. 1535 – grandson of Sir William) and his wife Joan (née Blennerhasset), in 1487.

== Marriage and issue ==
Calthorpe's first wife was Elizabeth (1406–1437), daughter of Reginald Grey, 3rd Baron Grey de Ruthyn, by whom Sir William had a son and two daughters.

His second wife was Elizabeth (1440/1 – 18 February 1505), eldest daughter and co-heir of Sir Miles Stapleton, of Ingham, Norfolk, by his spouse, Katherine de la Pole (c. 1416–1488), who settled the manor of Hempstead, Norfolk, upon Elizabeth. Sir William was subsequently found to be lord of three parts of it in 1491; his second surviving son, Sir Francis, died possessed of it in 1544, and his son William next inherited it, and sold it about 1573. William was the elder brother of Charles Calthorpe, for many years Attorney General for Ireland.

One of Sir William's daughters by his second marriage, Anne (d. before March 1558), married Sir Robert Drury, of Thurston, and Hawstead, Suffolk. Another of Sir William's daughters by his second marriage, Elizabeth Calthorpe married Francis Hasilden on 31 May 1494. They had a daughter, Frances Hasilden who married Sir Robert Peyton, of Isleham in January 1516, becoming ancestors of the Peyton baronets. Sir Robert Peyton of Isleham was the son of Sir Robert Peyton, of Wicken by Elizabeth Clere.

Children of Sir William Calthorpe and Elizabeth de Grey and Ruthyn, first marriage:

- John Calthorpe, who married Elizabeth Wentworth, the daughter of Roger Wentworth and Margery le Despenser, and had issue. His son Philip Calthorpe (b. 1463/4) was his grandfather Sir William Calthorpe's heir when Sir William died in 1494.
- Anne Calthorpe, who married William Gorney
- William Calthorpe (d. 1528) of Pokethorpe near Norwich, who married firstly Cicely and secondly Elizabeth Burney (d. 1546), daughter of John Burney, Esquire, and had by her a daughter and heiress Anne or Amy, who married Robert Jenyson of Barnham Westgate in Norfolk

After his death, Sir William Calthorpe's widow Elizabeth Stapleton remarried two or three times. Sir John Fortescue (d. 28 July 1500), Knight, of Ponsbourne in Hertfordshire, Chief Butler of England, was her second husband, Lord Edmund Howard was her last. Children of Sir William Calthorpe and Elizabeth Stapleton, second marriage:

- Richard Calthorpe, probably died young
- Edward Calthorpe of Ludham (d. 1557), who married Anne Cromer (d. 1557), and had issue. 'In 1 and 2 Mary (A.D. 1553–4), all gentlemen possessing land to the clear value of £40 per annum were called upon to take the honour of knighthood, or pay a composition to avoid it.' Edward paid 8s. 4d.
- Sir Francis Calthorpe (d. 1544), who married firstly Elizabeth Wyndham (d. 23 July 1536), daughter of John Wyndham, and had issue by her, and secondly Elizabeth Barney (d. 24 December 1582), daughter of Rafe Barney. His widow Elizabeth Barney, Lady Calthorpe, remarried after his death to John Culpeper, Esquire.
- John Calthorpe of Cockthorp, who married a daughter of the Ermingland family, and had issue
- Anne Calthorpe (d. before March 1558), married Sir Robert Drury, knight, of Thurston, and Hawstead, Suffolk
- Elizabeth Calthorpe, who married Francis Hasilden on 31 May 1494. They had a daughter, Frances Hasilden, who married Sir Robert Peyton of Isleham in January 1516, becoming ancestors of the Peyton baronets. Sir Robert Peyton of Isleham was the son of Sir Robert Peyton of Wicken by Elizabeth Clere.

== Will and death ==
One of the executors of Sir William's will was the Norfolk justice of the peace Sir Robert Clere of Ormesby St. Margaret, who was bequeathed 200 sheep. The will mentions that many of his ancestors were buried in St. Mary's, North Creake in north-west Norfolk. (Note: The will of Sir William Calthorpe is given in full in East Anglian Notes & Queries (vol.ii, p. 210), as an interesting specimen of wills of that date.) Many of his family are mentioned. Sir William was buried at White Friars, Norwich, beside his first wife, where many of their children also lay.

This had not always been the Calthorpes preferred resting place. His grandfather and namesake, who died in 1420, is commemorated with a fine brass at Burnham Thorpe, depicting him in full armor.

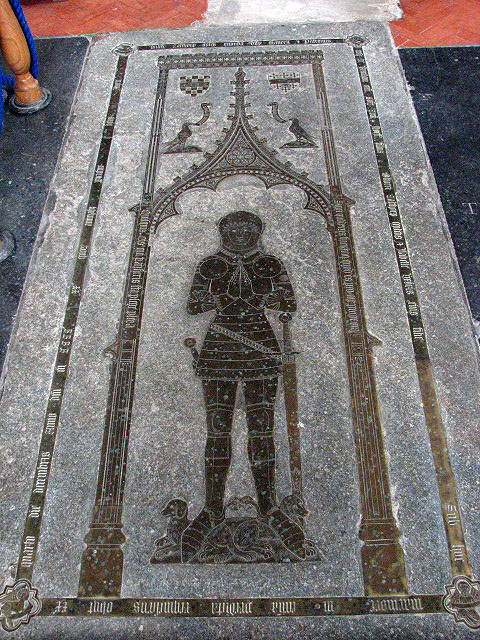
Brass to a certain Sir William Calthorpe (d. 1420 / MCCCXX) in All Saints Church, Burnham Thorpe

Arms above dexter: Chequy or and azure, a fess ermine (Calthorpe); sinister: arms of St Omer (Azure, a fess between six cross-crosslets or) for his second wife Sybilla de St. Omer, daughter and heiress of Sir Edward de St. Omer. It was his first wife, Elennor, daughter and heiress of Sir John Mautby, who was the grandmother of this Sir William.

== Sources ==
- Richardson, Douglas (2011). Everingham, Kimball G. (ed.). Plantagenet Ancestry: A Study in Colonial and Medieval Families. Vol. 1 (2nd ed.). Salt Lake City, Utah: Douglas Richardson. ISBN 978-14499-6-631-7.
- Wedgwood, Josiah Clement; Holt, Anne (1936). History of Parliament ... 1439-1509: Biographies of the Members of the Commons House. London: H.M. Stationery Office.

=== Further reading ===
- Banks, Sir T. C., Bt., Baronia Anglica Concentrata; or Baronies in Fee, London, 1844. Elizabeth Stapleton and her husband, Sir William Calthorpe, with their immediate successors, can be found in the summary pedigree of the Stapleton family on p. 267.
- Visitation of Yorkshire, 1563/4 by William Flower, Norroy King of Arms, published London, 1881, p. 295 (outline pedigree of the Stapleton family)..
- Burke, John, and John Bernard, The Royal Families of England, Scotland, and Wales, with their descendants, Sovereigns and Subjects, London, 1851, vol. 2, pedigree CXVII.
- Burke, Sir Bernard, Ulster King of Arms, Dormant, Abeyant, Forfeited, and Extinct Peerages of the British Empire, London, 1883, p. 504, where Sir William is erroneously named as Sir Philip.
- Carr-Calthorpe, Christopher William (1933) [1905]. Notes on the Families of Calthorpe and Calthrop (3rd ed.). London: F.A. Perry (privately published). OCLC 505064982.
- Shaw, William A., Litt.D., The Knights of England, London, 1906.
- Weis, Frederick Lewis, et al., (editor), The Magna Charta Sureties, 1215, 5th edition, Baltimore, 2002, p. 7.
