= Sir Edward Peyton, 2nd Baronet =

English landowner and politician

Sir Edward Peyton, 2nd Baronet (died April 1657) was an English landowner and politician who sat in the House of Commons at various times between 1621 and 1629. He fought for the Parliamentary cause in the English Civil War.

== Biography ==
Peyton was the eldest son of Sir John Peyton, 1st Baronet of Isleham and his wife Alice Osborne, daughter of Sir Edward Osborne, Lord Mayor of London. He was educated at Bury School. He was knighted at Whitehall on 18 March 1611. On 16 August 1611, he was admitted to Gray's Inn. He succeeded to the baronetcy and estates on the death of his father in December 1616. He was also owner of Great Bradley, Suffolk. In 1618 he was awarded MA by the University of Cambridge.

In 1621, Peyton was elected Member of Parliament for Cambridgeshire. He was High Sheriff of Cambridgeshire and Huntingdonshire from 1622 to 1623. In 1625 he was re-elected MP for Cambridgeshire and was returned again in 1626. He took an active part in the Civil War on the Parliamentary side, but so impoverished himself that he had to sell Isleham.

Peyton died at Wicken, Cambridgeshire and was buried at St Clement Danes in London.

== Family ==
Peyton married firstly on 24 April 1604, at Streatham, Surrey, Martha Livesey, daughter of Robert Livesey, of Tooting, Surrey. She died in 1613 and he married secondly on 6 June 1614, at St Bartholomew-the-Less, London, Jane Thimblethorpe, widow of Sir Henry Thimblethorpe, and daughter of Sir James Calthorpe, of Cockthorpe, Norfolk. He married thirdly on 13 December 1638 at St. James', Clerkenwell, Dorothy Minshaw. His widow married Rev. Edward Lowe, Vicar of Brighthelmstead, Sussex, who survived her. Peyton was succeeded in the baronetcy by his son by his first wife .

Parliament of England
Preceded by Sir Thomas Chicheley; Sir John Cutts	Member of Parliament for Cambridgeshire; 1621–1622; With: Sir John Cutts	Succeeded by Sir Simon Steward; Sir John Cutts
Preceded by Sir Simon Steward; Sir John Cutts	Member of Parliament for Cambridgeshire; 1624–1626; With: Sir John Cutts	Succeeded by Sir Miles Sandys, Bt; John Carleton
Baronetage of England
Preceded by John Peyton	Baronet (of Isleham); 1617–1657	Succeeded by John Peyton
