= Denzil Onslow Jr =

English cricketer (1802–1879)

Personal information
- Full name: Denzil Onslow
- Born: 27 July 1802; Middlesex
- Died: 10 February 1879; Great Staughton, Huntingdonshire

Domestic team information
- Years: Team
- 1821–1825: Cambridge University

Denzil Onslow Jr (27 July 1802 – 10 February 1879) was an English cricketer associated with Cambridge University who was active in the 1820s. He is recorded in two matches from 1821 to 1825, totalling 31 runs with a highest score of 26.

Onslow was the eldest son of General Denzil Onslow (1770–1838), of Staughton House, Great Staughton. He was educated at Eton and Trinity College, Cambridge. He was admitted to Lincoln's Inn in 1823 but is not recorded to have been called to the bar. He succeeded to Staughton House on his father's death and was a Justice of the Peace, and also High Sheriff of Huntingdonshire in 1963.
