= Carleton baronets =

Extinct baronetcy in the Baronetage of England

The Carleton Baronetcy, of Holcombe in the County of Oxford, was a title in the Baronetage of England. It was created on 28 May 1627 for John Carleton, subsequently Member of Parliament for Cambridgeshire. The title became extinct on the early death of his son, the second Baronet, in 1650.

Dudley Carleton, 1st Viscount Dorchester, was the uncle of the first Baronet.

== Carleton baronets, of Holcombe (1627) ==
- Sir John Carleton, 1st Baronet (died 1637)
- Sir George Carleton, 2nd Baronet (c. 1622–1650)
