= Leverington =

Village in Cambridgeshire, England

Coordinates: 52.6822°N 0.1359°E

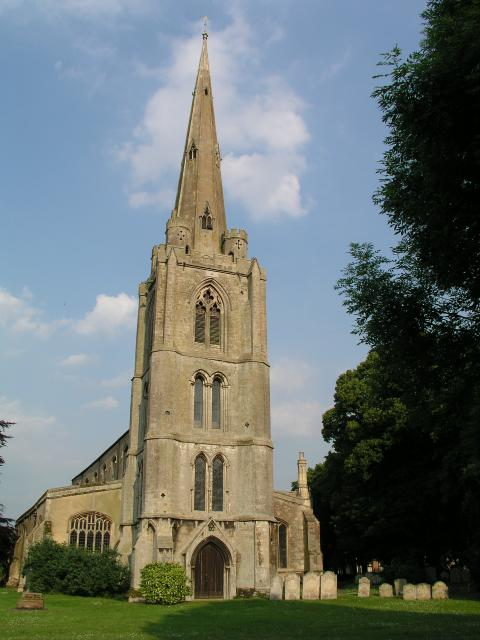
- St Leonard's church

- Location within Cambridgeshire
- Population: 3,339 (2011)
- OS grid reference: TF4411
- District: Fenland
- Shire county: Cambridgeshire
- Region: East
- Country: England
- Sovereign state: United Kingdom
- Post town: Wisbech
- Postcode district: PE13
- Dialling code: 01945
- Police: Cambridgeshire
- Fire: Cambridgeshire
- Ambulance: East of England

Leverington is a village and civil parish in the Fenland District of Cambridgeshire, England. The settlement is to the north of Wisbech.

At the time of the 2001 Census, the parish's population was 2,914 people, including Four Gotes, increasing to 3,339 at the 2011 Census.

== History ==
Leverington - an estate linked with a man called Leofhere. The 13th-century church of St Leonard is a Grade I listed building, noted for its spire, restored 15th-century, a Tree of Jesse window, and carved font. Rectors of the parish have included John Ailleston, Richard Reynolds, James Nasmith, Thomas Yale and John Jenkinson. Dramatist Edmund John Eyre (1767–1816), was a son of a rector.

Leverington Hall, originally constructed in the 17th century, is also Grade I listed.

In the middle of the 19th century a peppermint distillery was located in the parish.

Until 1870, Parson Drove and Gorefield were part of Leverington parish.

== Whirling Sunday ==
The Foods of England website states "The Gentleman's Magazine of 1789 reported a legend that an old woman of Leverington made some cakes which were so enjoyed by one of her guests, the devil in disguise, that he created a whirlwind to carry off both her and the cakes. A style of cake was baked on the fifth Sunday in Lent in supposed commemoration of this" and that the compendium Time's Telescope of 1823 adds that 'they are made by almost every family'."

The Cambridge Chronicle in 1865 reported "The Sunday before Palm Sunday, in the Parish of Leverington, is called Whirling Sunday. We are not aware that the origin of it is anywhere recorded, or that in any other place there is a similar observance. It is very probable that the name is a corruption, and the tradition of its having originated in a whirlwind is too glaring an absurdity. The superstition attached to it, which, a few years since, had not entirely died away, was, that if you did not spend your penny in the purchase of whirling cake, you be unlucky the year through. Under cover of this excuse it became the scene of rioting and drunkenness. Of late years the disgraceful part of the observance has had scarcely any existence; but still great numbers, particularly from the town, walk down in the afternoon, with no other object than to walk back again. Some of the older inhabitants of the village invite their friends to tea, and treat them with hot whirling cakes, which, we believe, in their composition is nothing more than ordinary buns".

In 1891 Frederick Carlyon, rector of Leverington, described it as "Whirling Sunday". He stated "None of the old people know anything of the origin of the Legend. But there are still many who recollect when there was a regular pleasure fair held in Leverington on Whirling Sunday, when a particular kind of whirling cake was made in most houses, and sports of all kinds, especially boxing matches, were carried on, and a regular holiday observed. There was no religious ceremony that I can hear of observed of on the day beyond the ordinary Church Services. Whirling cakes still continue to be made in one or two houses, but that and the memory of the day only remain. The Legend of the old woman being whirled over the church steeple is still repeated." Fredk Carlyon, the Rectory, Leverington.

== Architecture ==
=== Notable buildings and monuments ===
- Leverington Hall a Grade I listed 17th-century country house.
- Malvern House - a Grade II listed building, built c1840. once the home of the pioneer photographer Samuel Smith.
- Park House - a Grade II listed building. House, c.1720 with possibly slightly earlier range at rear. Red brick on plinth with parapetted roof, leaded, with end stacks. A residence of the Lumpkin family.

== SS Leverington ==
The Cambridge Chronicle reported in 1869 "Launch. - On Saturday last a very fine new screw steamer named the Leverington was launched from the yards of J. Laing, Sunderland. The Leverington - is the property of Richard Young, Esq., and is the largest and most powerful of that gentleman's fleet of steam ships".

== Notable residents ==
=== Deceased ===
- James Hill (1798-1872) a Unitarian, banker, merchant, school owner, theatre owner, newspaper owner, ship owner and father of Octavia Hill and Miranda Hill lived in Leverington prior to moving to Wisbech.
- Samuel (Philosopher) Smith (1802-1892) timber merchant and pioneer photographer.
- Richard Young (MP) (1809-1871) politician, merchant, ship owner, farmer and local landowner.
- Nicholas Lumpkin (died 1825) on whom the character Tony Lumpkin, in Oliver Goldsmith's play She Stoops to Conquer, is reputed to be based. Lumpkin later moved to Wisbech after his money ran out.
