= John Cotton (MP died 1593) =

16th-century English politician

Sir John Cotton (1512/13 – 21 April 1593), of Cheveley and Landwade, Cambridgeshire, was an English politician.

== Family ==
Cotton was the first surviving son of Sir Robert Cotton of Landwade. He married Isobel Spencer (died 1578), daughter of Sir William Spencer of Althorp. The Cottons had eight sons, including the MP, John Cotton, and five daughters.

== Career ==
He was a member (MP) of the Parliament of England for Cambridgeshire in October 1553 and November 1554 and was selected High Sheriff of Cambridgeshire and Huntingdonshire for 1549–50 and 1556–57. He was knighted in 1553.
