= Sir John Carleton, 1st Baronet =

English landowner and politician

Sir John Carleton, 1st Baronet (died 7 November 1637) was an English landowner and politician who sat in the House of Commons from 1628 to 1629.

Carleton was the son of George Carleton of Holcombe, Oxfordshire and his wife Elizabeth Brockett, daughter of Sir John Brocket of Brocket Hall, Hertfordshire. John Carleton's grandfather, Anthony Carleton, had been a member of parliament in the 1550s. John was at Christ Church, Oxford, and was awarded BA on 10 February 1610. On 28 May 1627, he was created a baronet and on 8 March 1628, he succeeded to Holcombe on the death of his father. He was elected Member of Parliament for Cambridgeshire in 1628 and sat until 1629 when King Charles decided to rule without parliament for eleven years.

Carleton inherited the estate of Brightwell, Oxfordshire on the death of his uncle Dudley Carleton, 1st Viscount Dorchester. He became a Gentleman of the Privy Chamber in 1633 and from 1636 to 1637 he was High Sheriff of Cambridgeshire.

Carleton died in London and was buried at Brightwell.

Carleton married Lady Anne Cotton, widow of Sir John Cotton of Landwade, Cambridgeshire and daughter of Sir Richard Hoghton, 1st Baronet. Through this marriage he came into the possession of Cheveley Park. He was succeeded in the baronetcy by his son George.

Parliament of England
Preceded by Sir Edward Peyton, Bt; Sir John Cutts	Member of Parliament for Cambridgeshire; 1628–1629; With: Sir Miles Sandys, Bt	Parliament suspended until 1640
Baronetage of England
New creation	Baronet (of Holcombe); 1627–1637	Succeeded by George Carleton
