= Simon Steward (MP) =

English politician

Sir Simon Steward (31 July 1575 – 10 February 1632) was an English politician who sat in the House of Commons at various times between 1614 and 1629.

Steward was the only surviving son of Sir Mark Steward of Stuntney, matriculated at Hart Hall, Oxford, on 8 December 1587 and was awarded BA on 11 February 1591. He was a student of Gray's Inn in 1590, and Trinity Hall, Cambridge. He succeeded his father in 1604 and was knighted on 23 July 1603.

He was a justice of the peace for the Isle of Ely from 1604 to 1614 and from 1617 to his death and for Cambridgeshire from 1614 to his death. He was appointed High Sheriff of Cambridgeshire and Huntingdonshire for 1611–12. In 1614, he was elected member of parliament for Shaftesbury for the Addled Parliament. He was elected MP for Cambridgeshire for the Happy Parliament in 1624 but was unseated in March the same year. In 1628 he was elected MP for Aldeburgh and sat until 1639 when King Charles decided to rule without parliament for eleven years.

He married twice: firstly Grace, the daughter of Edward St. Barbe of Ashington, Somerset, and having one son, and secondly Mary, the daughter of Sir John Monson of South Carlton, Lincolnshire, and the widow of Sir Thomas Reresby of Thribergh, Yorkshire. He was succeeded by his son, who died within two years, the estate passing to Sir Simon's grandson, Thomas.

Parliament of England
Preceded by Henry Croke; Sir Miles Sandys	Member of Parliament for Shaftesbury; 1614; With: Henry Croke	Succeeded by William Beecher; Thomas Sheppard
Preceded by Sir Edward Peyton, 2nd Baronet; Sir John Cutts	Member of Parliament for Cambridgeshire; 1624; With: Sir John Cutts	Succeeded by Sir Edward Peyton, 2nd Baronet; Sir John Cutts
Preceded by Sir Thomas Glemham; William Mason	Member of Parliament for Aldeburgh; 1628–1629; With: Marmaduke Rawden	Parliament suspended until 1640
