= Henry Peyton (courtier) =

Henry Peyton, attributed to Daniël Mijtens, Colchester and Ipswich Museums Service

Henry Peyton (died 1623) was an English courtier and soldier.

== Career ==
Henry Peyton was a son of Thomas Peyton of Bury St Edmunds (a great grandson of Thomas Peyton), and his wife Cecilia Bourchier, a daughter of John Bourchier, 2nd Earl of Bath.

Henry Peyton was gentleman of the Privy Chamber of Henry Frederick, Prince of Wales. He was listed as an "extraordinary" gentleman, meaning that he was not in regular attendance in the Prince's household.

Knighted by King James in May 1606 at Royston, he was a member of the Virginia Company.

On 22 September 1607, Henry Peyton married Mary Seymour, a daughter of Edward Seymour, 1st Duke of Somerset.

Mary Seymour, Lady Peyton, died in January 1620 and was buried at Westminster Abbey. The funeral was attended by aristocrats and soldiers. Henry Peyton died abroad in 1623.

== Portrait of a soldier ==
Peyton's portrait in military or tournament costume is attributed to Daniël Mijtens. A version of this portrait was formerly part of group known as "Lord Vere's captains" at Raynham Hall. Henry Peyton commanded a company of foot in 1604 in the Low Countries and led a company in Vere's regiment in Cleves-Jülich in 1614. In 1618, Peyton and Henry Mainwaring were given the command of an English fleet in the service of the Venetian Republic.
