= John Ailleston =

John Ailleston (or Ayleston) (fl. 1410s - 1410s) was a Canon of Windsor from 1404 to 1405.

== Career ==
He was appointed:

- Prebendary of the third stall in St Stephen's, Westminster 1404 - 1414
- Vicar of Leverington, Cambridgeshire 1414
- Prebendary of Newark College, Leicester 1405
- Rector of Towcester 1408 - 1414
- Rector of Stanwell, Middlesex 1408 - 1414
- Master of St Mary's Hospital, Chichester 1412
- Rector of Worthen, Shropshire 1412
- Prebendary of Ely 1414

He was appointed to the sixth stall in St George's Chapel, Windsor Castle in 1404 and held the canonry until 1405.
