= John Cotton (cricketer) =

English cricketer (born 1940)

Personal information
- Born: 7 November 1940 (age 86); Newstead, Nottinghamshire, England
- Batting: Right-handed
- Bowling: Right-arm fast-medium
- Role: Bowler

Domestic team information
- Years: Team
- 1958–1964: Nottinghamshire
- 1965–1969: Leicestershire

Career statistics
Competition	FC	LA
Matches	239	15
Runs scored	1631	21
Batting average	8.53	3.50
100s/50s	0/1	0/0
Top score	58	9*
Balls bowled	36,203	852
Wickets	652	15
Bowling average	25.57	31.46
5 wickets in innings	21	0
10 wickets in match	1	n/a
Best bowling	9/29	3/49
Catches/stumpings	74/–	7/–
- Source: Cricinfo, 26 June 2021

John Cotton (born 7 November 1940) is a former English cricketer. He was a right-arm fast-medium bowler and tail-end right-handed batsman who played first-class cricket for Nottinghamshire and Leicestershire between 1958 and 1969.

Cotton was born in Newstead, Nottinghamshire. He made his first-class debut for Nottinghamshire in 1958 at the age of 17 years and 181 days.

Cotton took his best first-class bowling figures in 1967 for Leicestershire against the touring Indian team, when he "utterly demolished the tourists' batting in just over two hours", finishing with 9 for 29 and dismissing the Indians for 63. He took three wickets in four balls for Nottinghamshire against the touring South African team in 1960, and took a hat-trick on the first morning of Leicestershire's match against Surrey at The Oval in May 1965.
