= Robert Peyton (MP died 1550) =

English politician

Sir Robert Thomas Peyton (by 1498 – 1550) of Isleham, Cambridgeshire, was an English politician.

== Family ==
He was born the eldest son of Sir Robert Peyton of Isleham. He married Frances, the daughter and heiress of Francis Haselden of Guilden Morden, Cambridgeshire and Chesterford, Essex by Elizabeth Calthorpe, daughter of Sir William Calthorp KB, and with her had six sons, including the MP Robert Peyton, and two daughters.

== Career ==
He was a member (MP) of the parliament of England for Cambridgeshire in 1529. He was knighted sometime after that year.
