= Thomas Chicheley =

English politician

Sir Thomas Chicheley
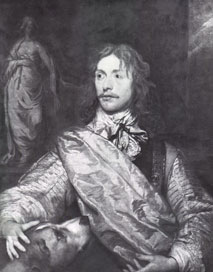

Master-General of the Ordnance
- In office 1670–1674

Personal details
- Born: 14 March 1614
- Died: 1 February 1699 (aged 84)

Sir Thomas Chicheley (25 March 1614 – 1 February 1699) of Wimpole Hall, Cambridgeshire was a politician in England in the seventeenth century who fell from favour in the reign of James II. His name is sometimes spelt as Chichele.

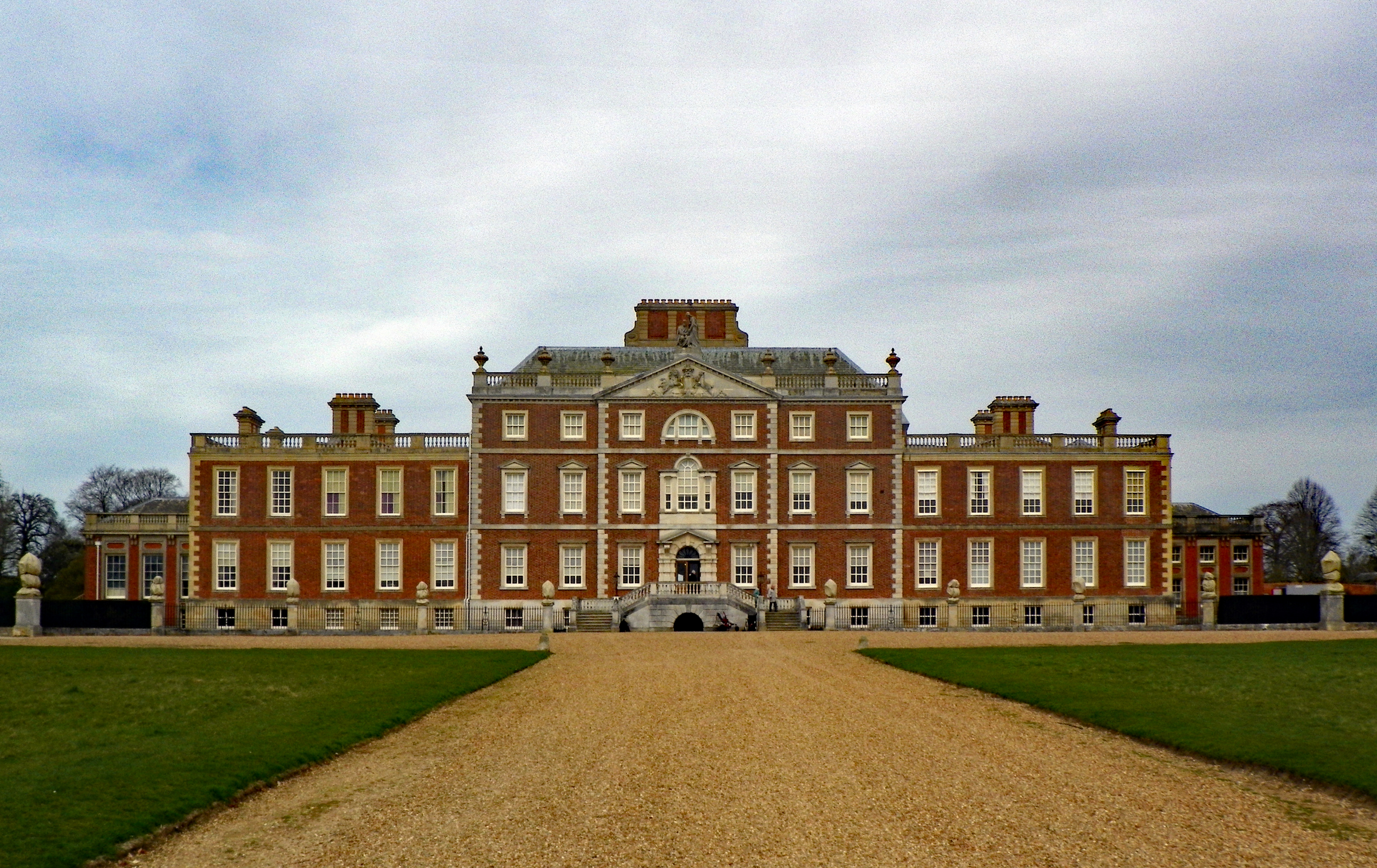
Wimpole Hall, Cambridgeshire

== Life ==
He was born the eldest surviving son of Thomas Chicheley (1578–1616) of Wimpole and was related to Henry Chichele, Archbishop of Canterbury and founder of All Souls College, Oxford. He succeeded his father to Wimpole Hall, the largest house in Cambridgeshire.

He was High Sheriff of Cambridgeshire for 1637–38, and in 1640 was elected to the Long Parliament as one of the MPs for Cambridgeshire. However, being a strong Royalist, he was "disabled from sitting" (in other words expelled) soon after the outbreak of the Civil War. After the Restoration, he was elected once more for Cambridgeshire in the Parliament of 1661–1679, and subsequently sat for the city of Cambridge until his retirement after the Convention Parliament (1689).

He was appointed a deputy lieutenant for the county by 1639 to 1642 and from 1660 to 1685. He was also custos rotulorum for the county in 1642 and, after the restoration in 1660, for Cambridgeshire and Ely (until 1687).

In 1670, he was knighted, made a member of the Privy Council and appointed Master-General of the Ordnance. He held that office until 1679, when he was succeeded by three Commissioners of the Ordnance, including his son John. The same year he became Chancellor of the Duchy of Lancaster, but was ejected from office and expelled from the Privy Council on 2 March 1687 by James II. He sat again, however, in Parliament for the city of Cambridge in 1678, 1679, 1685, and 1689, and died in 1699, at the age of eighty-four.

According to Pepys, Chicheley lived extravagantly in London, and this was probably the reason that he was forced to sell his Wimpole estate to Sir John Cutler thirteen years before his death. He had married Sarah, the daughter of Sir William Russell, and had 3 sons (who all predeceased him) and 2 daughters. After Sarah's death in 1654 he married again circa 1655 to Anne, the daughter of Sir Thomas Coventry, 1st Baron Coventry of Aylesborough and the widow of Sir William Savile, 3rd Baronet, of Thornhill, Yorkshire and had 2 further sons.

Parliament of England
Preceded by Thomas Wendy; Isaac Thornton	Member of Parliament for Cambridgeshire; 1661–1679; With: Thomas Wendy 1661–1674; Sir Thomas Hatton, 2nd Baronet 1674–1679	Succeeded by Gerard Russell; Edward Partherich
Preceded by The Lord Alington; Roger Pepys	Member of Parliament for Cambridge; 1679–1689; With: The Lord Alington 1679–1685; Sir William Wren 1685–1689; Sir John Cotton 1685–1689	Succeeded by Sir John Cotton; Granado Pigot
Political offices
Vacant Title last held by Sir John Cutts	Custos Rotulorum of Cambridgeshire; 1642–1687	Succeeded by Edward Russell
Preceded by Sir Robert Carr	Chancellor of the Duchy of Lancaster; 1682–1687	Succeeded by seal in commission
Military offices
Preceded by In Commission	Master-General of the Ordnance; 1670–1679	Succeeded by Thomas Chicheley
Honorary titles
Preceded by Sir John Carleton, Bt	High Sheriff of Cambridgeshire; 1637	Succeeded by Thomas Wendy
