= Four Gotes =

Village in Cambridgeshire, United Kingdom

Coordinates: 52.729°N 0.145°E

Four Gotes is a hamlet in the civil parishs of Newton-in-the-Isle and Tydd St Giles in Cambridgeshire, England. The population is included in both of the civil parishes.
