= Robert Peyton (died 1590) =

English politician

Robert Peyton (by 1523 – 1590), of Isleham, Cambridgeshire, was an English politician.

== Family ==
Robert was the son of Robert Peyton, MP. He married Elizabeth Rich, daughter of Richard Rich, 1st Baron Rich of Rochford Hall and Leigh's Priory, Essex. Their eldest surviving son was Sir John Peyton, 1st Baronet.

== Career ==
He was a member (MP) of the parliament of England for Cambridgeshire in 1558 and 1563.
