= Leverington Hall =

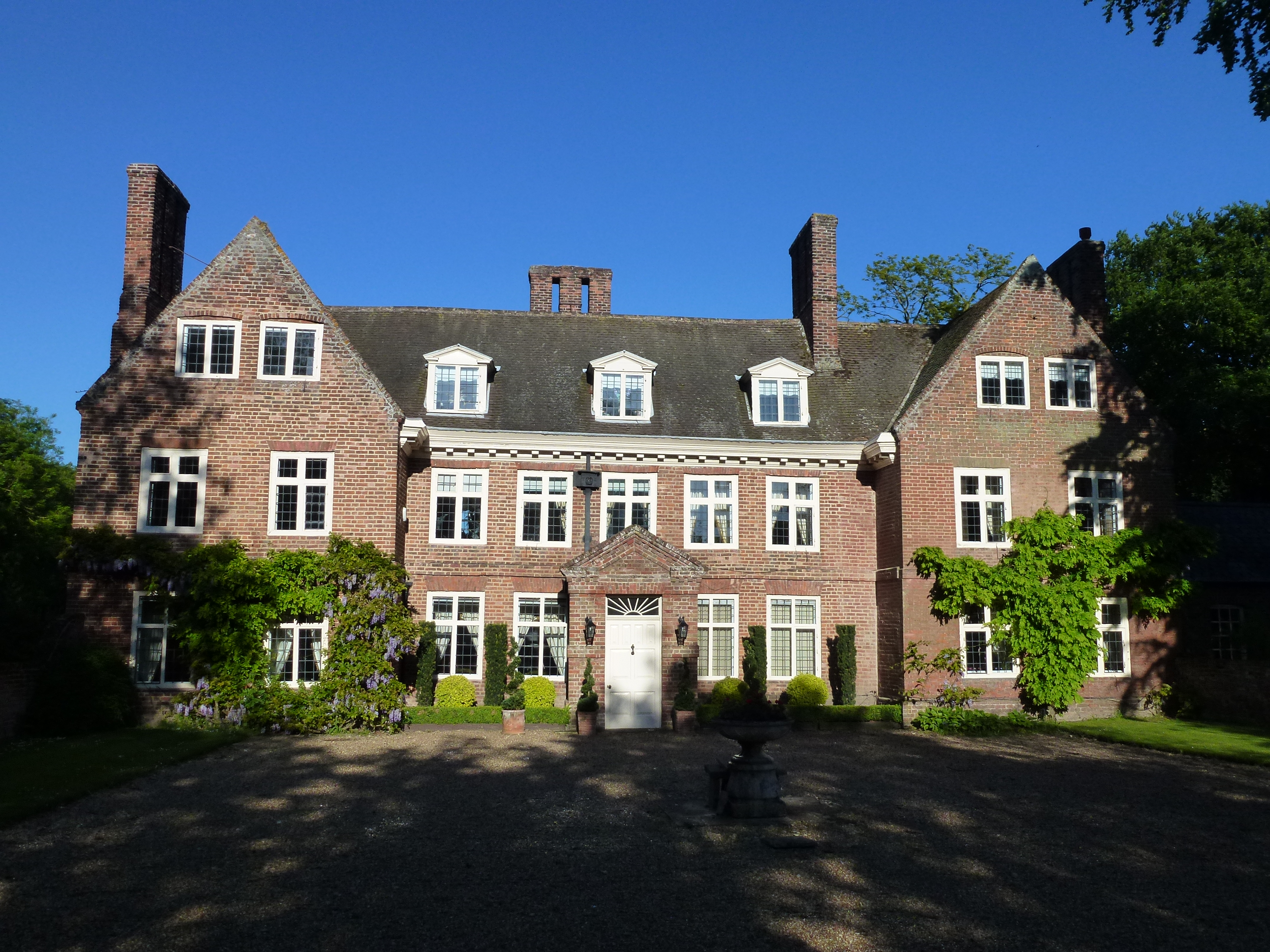
- Leverington Hall on Church Road

- Location within Cambridgeshire
- 52.679778°N 0.136944°E
- Type: English bond brickwork country house
- Location: Leverington, England

History
- Built: c. 1630
- Built for: Robert Swaine

Site notes
- Architectural style: Elizabethan

Listed Building – Grade I
- Designated: 23 June 1952
- Reference no.: 1125948

Leverington Hall is a 17th-century country house in the parish of Leverington, Cambridgeshire, England. The house is Grade I listed and is privately owned.

== History ==
The parish of Leverington was not mentioned in the Domesday Book. It is believed that an earlier building, Durham's Place, was on the site. Durham's Place was the property and residence of William Everard, son of Sir Lawrence Everard. The main body of the current house was built c. 1630, with a crosswing added to the south end in the early 18th century. The first owner was Robert Swaine (d. 1705), son of Thomas Swaine of Wisbech.

Robert Swaine is believed to have inherited substantial wealth through the deaths of his father and brother (also Thomas Swaine), and through his marriage in 1640 to Mary Freeman, daughter of London merchant William Freeman. Swaine added considerably to the property. Leverington Hall was passed into the hands of his only surviving son, Thomas (1645-1728), a justice of the peace. A lead rainwater head, dated 1716, contains a crest and initials "T.S.E." for Thomas and Elizabeth Swaine.

Leverington Hall stayed in the Swaine family until 1785, when the house and surrounding 32 acres were offered for sale at auction, and over the years it passed through several hands. In 1946, the house was sold to George Campbell Munday, who was decorated with the Military Cross, and was still living there in the 1950s. Munday's daughter Hope married Anthony Brooks, who was highly decorated for his service in the Second World War.

The house went up for sale for £2,000,000 in 2022.

== See also ==
- List of country houses in the United Kingdom
