= Sheriff of Huntingdon and Peterborough =

Ceremonial officer of Huntingdon and Peterborough, England

Below is a list of Sheriffs of Huntingdon and Peterborough since the creation of that county in 1965 until its abolition in 1974:

- 1965–1966: Oscar Ernest Johnson, of Rippington Manor, Great Gransden, near Sandy, Bedfordshire.
- 1966–1967: Lieut-Colonel Peter Esmé Brassey, of The Close House, Barnack, Stamford, Lincs.
- 1967–1968: Commander Charles Francis Alington, RN, of Hemingford Park, Hemingford Abbots, Huntingdon.
- 1968–1969: Allan Ivor Baker,, of 29 Westwood Park Road, Peterborough.
- 1969–1970: John Jenkins Goodliff, of The Cedars, Houghton, Huntingdon.
- 1970–1971: Lieut-Colonel Darrell John Robert Moore, of Wennington Lodge, Abbots Ripton, Huntingdon.
- 1971–1972: Richard Maynard Maris, of The Old Rectory, Alwalton, Peterborough.
- 1972–1973: John Patteson Strong, of The Croft, Tilbrook, Huntingdonshire.
- 1973–1974: Geoffrey Walford Wilks, of Walnut House, Ufford, Stamford, Lincs.
