= Hildersham =

Village in Cambridgeshire, England

Coordinates: 52.11°N 0.25°E

- Location within Cambridgeshire
- Population: 211 (2011)
- OS grid reference: TL5448
- District: South Cambridgeshire
- Shire county: Cambridgeshire
- Region: East
- Country: England
- Sovereign state: United Kingdom
- Post town: CAMBRIDGE
- Postcode district: CB21
- Dialling code: 01223
- Police: Cambridgeshire
- Fire: Cambridgeshire
- Ambulance: East of England
- UK Parliament: South East Cambridgeshire

Hildersham is a small village 8 miles (13 km) to the south-east of Cambridge, England. It is situated just off the A1307 between Linton and Great Abington on a tributary of the River Cam known locally as the River Granta.

The parish boundary extends from the Roman Road, known in medieval times as Wool Street, north of the village, to the border with Essex to the south.

The village sign was designed by D.E. Arkright, who along with her husband, R.B. Arkright, lived in the village for over 40 years.

== Population ==
In the 2001 census, the parish had a population of 202, in 81 households, increasing to a population of 211 in 90 households at the 2011 Census.

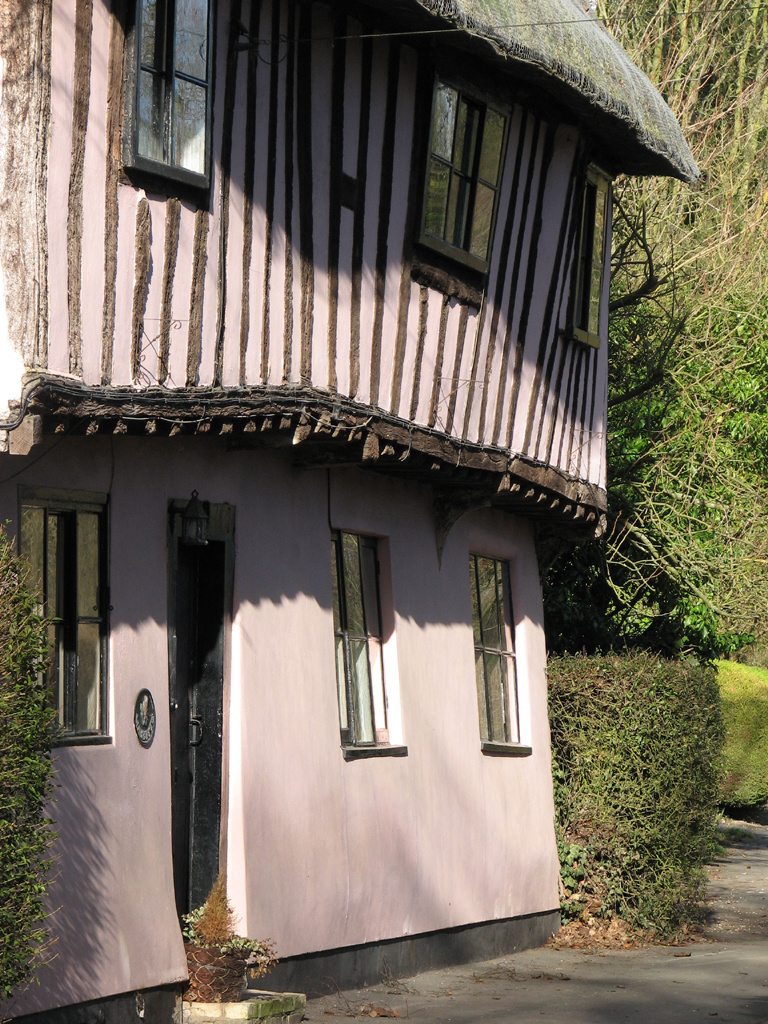
Timber framed house in Hildersham

== History ==
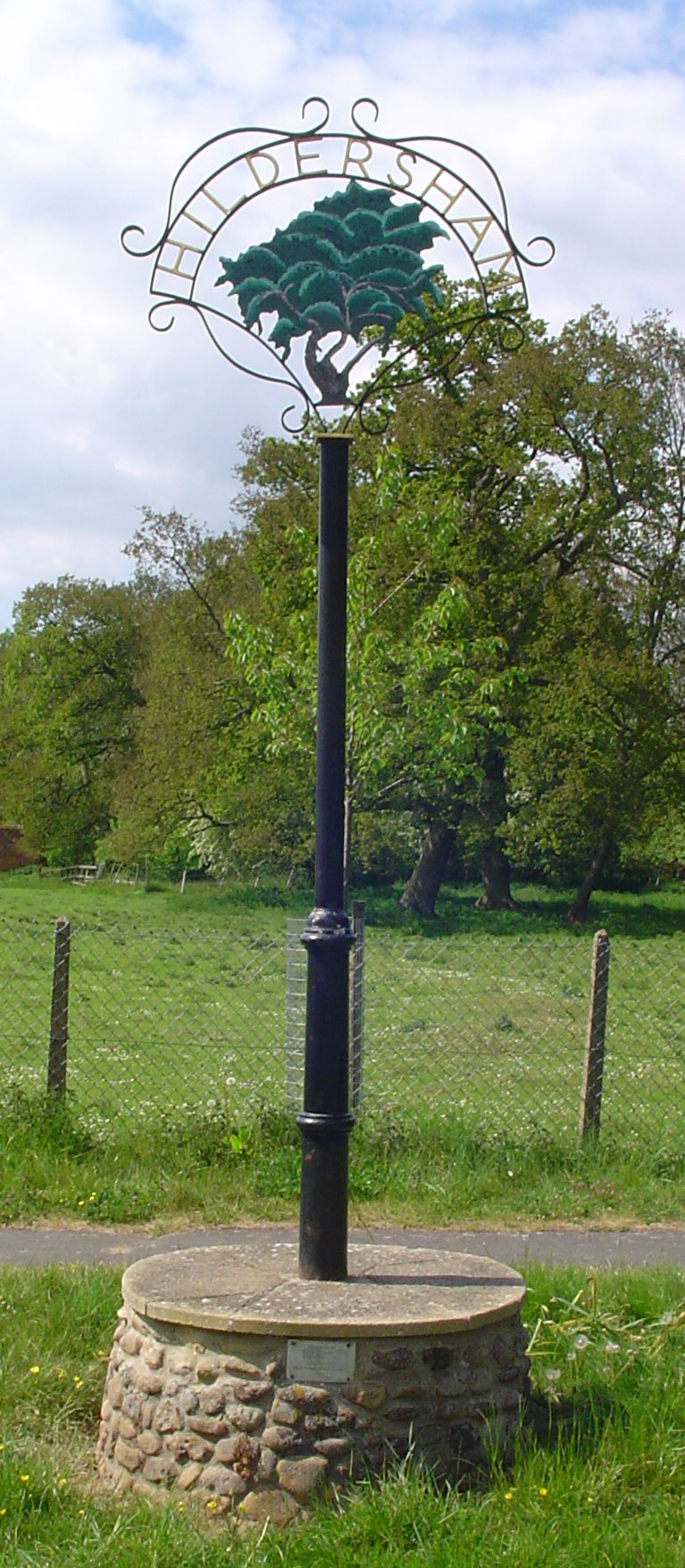
Village sign in Hildersham

The place-name 'Hildersham' is first attested in the Domesday Book of 1086, where it appears as Hildricesham. The name means 'Hildric's village or settlement'. At the time of Domesday there were 20 residents in the parish.

One of England's greatest chroniclers, Matthew Paris, is believed to have been born in Hildersham, where the Paris family were at one time lords of the manor. The Anglican divine Conyers Middleton died in the village in 1750.

== Church ==
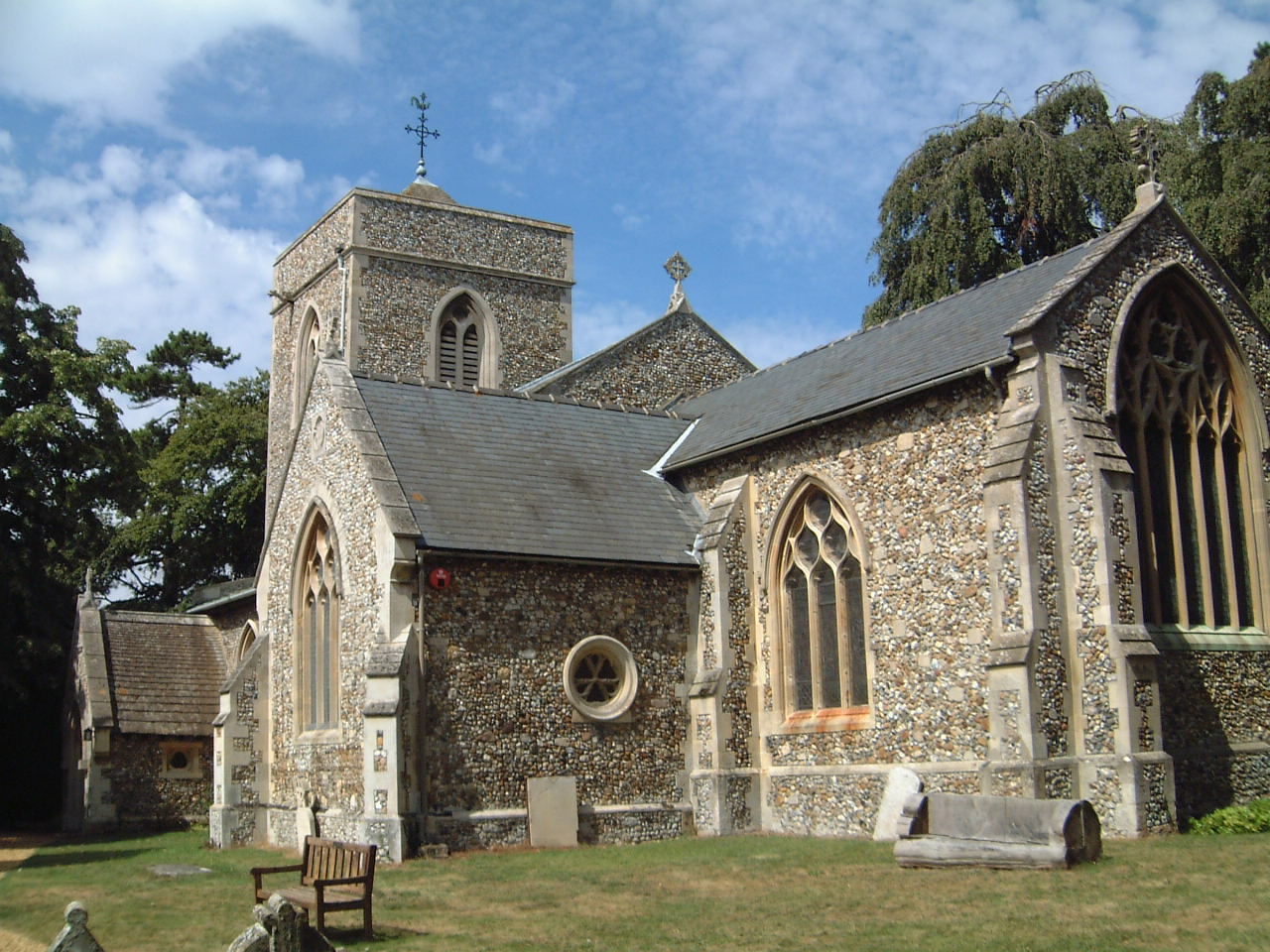
Holy Trinity Church, Hildersham

The parish is served by Holy Trinity Church in Hildersham. The church was first built in the 12th century, and the present tower and sacristy survive from that date. The tall nave was rebuilt in the late 13th century and the chancel arch around 1400. The original 12th-century octagonal font is still present.

== Village life ==
Until August 2013, the village was home to The Pear Tree public house.

== See also ==
The Hundred Parishes
