= John Cotton (MP died 1620 or 1621) =

English politician

Sir John Cotton (1543? – 1620 or 1621), of Landwade, Cambridgeshire, was an English politician.

== Biography ==
Cotton was the eldest son of John Cotton of Landwade, Cambridgeshire and his wife Isabell, daughter of Sir William Spencer of Althorp. He succeeded his father in 1594 and was knighted between 1597 and 1 October 1601.

He was appointed a justice of the peace for Cambridgeshire in 1582, served as Custos Rotulorum of Cambridgeshire from 1600 to 1621 (except for 1617) and custos rotulorum of the Isle of Ely from 1601. He was pricked High Sheriff of Cambridgeshire and Huntingdonshire for 1591–92 and appointed Deputy Lieutenant of Cambridgeshire in 1596.

He was elected a member of parliament (MP) in the Parliament of England for Cambridgeshire in 1593 and 1601. He built or significantly expanded Cheveley Park in 1603.

He married three times:

1. Elizabeth, the daughter of Thomas Caryll of Warnham, Sussex
2. Elizabeth, the daughter of Sir Humphrey Bradbourne of Derbyshire
3. Anne, the daughter of Sir Richard Hoghton, 1st Baronet of Hoghton Tower and the granddaughter of Sir Richard Houghton, Steward of Amounderness, the mother of his son John. His widow subsequently married Sir John Carleton, 1st Baronet.
