= Isaac Thornton =

English Member of Parliament (1615–1669)

Sir Isaac Thornton (27 February 1615 – 1 May 1669) was an English lawyer and politician who sat in the House of Commons in 1660.

Thornton was the son of Sir Roger Thornton of Soane, Cambridgeshire. He matriculated from Corpus Christi College, Cambridge at Easter 1631. He was admitted at Lincoln's Inn on 20 June 1632 and was called to the Bar in 1640.

In 1660, Thornton was elected Member of Parliament for Cambridgeshire in the Convention Parliament. He was knighted on 19 March 1661.

Thornton was of Snailwell, Cambridgeshire. He died at the age of 54 and is buried in the parish church in Snailwell.
