= Denzil Onslow (British Army officer) =

British general and politician

General Denzil Onslow (12 September 1770 – 21 August 1838) was a British soldier. He was born at Marylebone, London, the son of the British Member of Parliament Middleton Onslow.

== Military career ==
He was commissioned as an ensign in the 1st Regiment of Foot Guards in 1787 and was promoted to lieutenant in 1793, with the rank of captain in the Army. In 1794 he purchased the rank of major in the 19th Regiment of Foot, and later that year was appointed lieutenant-colonel of Sir James Grant's newly-raised 97th Regiment of Foot. The regiment was disbanded the following year, so he was on half-pay when granted the brevet rank of colonel in 1800. He was thereafter promoted by seniority to major-general in 1805, lieutenant-general in 1811, and general in 1825.

== Family ==
His daughter, Amelia, married Thomas Chamberlayne, who played for Hampshire; their son Tankerville Chamberlayne also had a brief career as a cricketer, and was Member of Parliament for the Southampton constituency three times. The main road through Bevois Valley was named Onslow Road after Onslow as was nearby Denzil Avenue.

In 1833, Onslow was living at Great Staughton and was appointed High Sheriff of Cambridgeshire and Huntingdonshire. He died in 1838 at Huntingdon.

== Cricket ==
Onslow was also an amateur cricketer who made nine known appearances in high-level matches from 1796 to 1807. He was mainly associated with Marylebone Cricket Club (MCC) but also represented other teams.
