= Landwade =

Village in Suffolk, England

Coordinates: 52°17′10″N 0°23′0″E

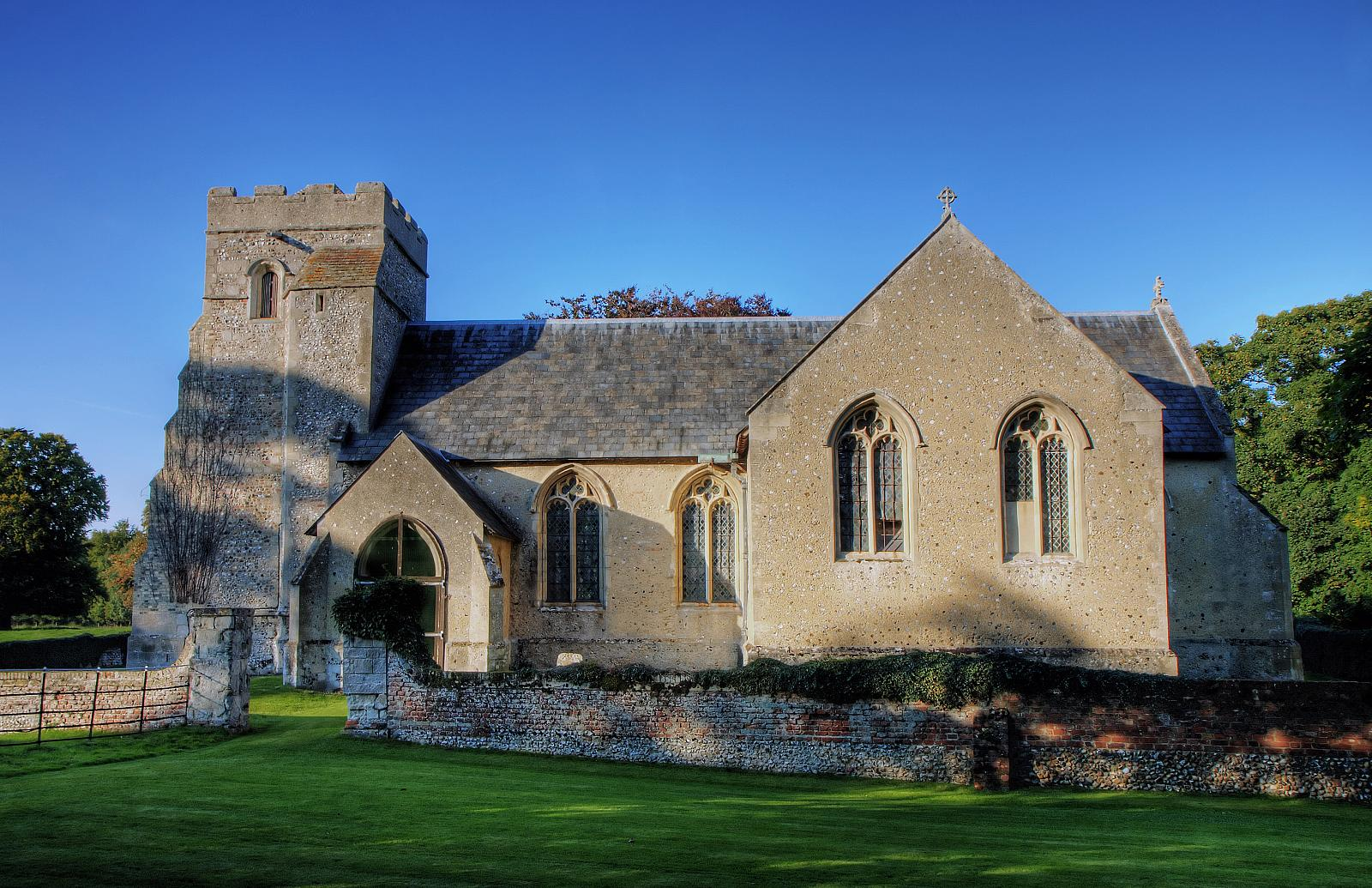
- St Nicholas’s Church, Landwade

- Location within Suffolk
- Civil parish: Exning
- District: West Suffolk
- Shire county: Suffolk
- Region: East
- Country: England
- Sovereign state: United Kingdom
- Post town: NEWMARKET
- Postcode district: CB8
- UK Parliament: West Suffolk

Landwade is a village and former civil parish, now in the parish of Exning, in the West Suffolk district, in the county of Suffolk, England. It is 4 miles north of Newmarket. It was one of the smallest parishes in the county, it is only 1 kilometre from north to south and at most 500m from east to west. In 1951 the parish had a population of 38.

The village is crossed by the New River (formerly known as Monk's Lode), a small river that flows through Wicken Fen and reaches the River Cam at Upware. The village's name probably derives in part from gewaed, an Old English word meaning "ford".

== History ==
The area around Landwade was occupied in Roman times, and a villa was situated just to the south of the modern parish.

Although it has existed since early medieval times, the parish of Landwade has always been comparatively small. By the late 13th century it consisted of around 300 acres of farmland and around 1400 acres of fen, but boundary changes between 1881 and 1954 reduced it to its present size of only 127 acres. The civil parish was amalgamated with Fordham, Cambridgeshire on 1 April 1954, though it is now part of the parish of Exning in Suffolk.

Parishes of its size were often absorbed in the Middle Ages, but Landwade survived thanks to the rebuilding of the church by Walter Cotton (d. after 1434), Lord of the Manor, in the 15th century to serve as a burial place for his family. The Manor of Landwade had passed to Sir Thomas Cotton, Knt., of Cotton Hall, Cambs., by virtue of his marriage to Alice, daughter and heiress of John Hastings, Lord of the Manor of Landwade in the 14th century.

Landwade Hall, a large house that was partially destroyed by bombs during the Second World War, was the ancestral home of the Cotton family until they moved to Madingley in the 18th century. From 1919, it was the home of William Tatem, 1st Baron Glanely.

== County ==
Historically in Cambridgeshire, Landwade has only been part of Suffolk since 1994.

Neighbouring Exning and the northern part of Newmarket were historically almost an island of Suffolk in east Cambridgeshire. The narrow parish of Newmarket All Saints was transferred from Cambridgeshire to this part of Suffolk in 1895, but the "bridge" linking it to the rest of the county was still only a few tens of metres wide as late as 1994, when local government reforms that came into effect on 1 April of that year substantially increased its width.

In the early 1970s, when major alterations were about to be made to the borders of many English counties, it was proposed that Newmarket and Exning be moved to Cambridgeshire, but this was voted down by residents in a referendum.

Although only small parcels of land were transferred when further adjustments to the Suffolk/Cambridgeshire border were made in 1994, some houses changed county nonetheless: two people moved from Suffolk to Cambridgeshire, and ten from Cambridgeshire to Suffolk. All of the houses affected were in the estate of Landwade Hall, and Landwade's church was among the buildings transferred to Suffolk.

== Church ==
The Grade II* listed church of St Nicholas is privately owned and located in the grounds of Landwade Hall.

Built in the mid 15th century by Walter Cotton, the church contains fine memorials to members of the Cotton family.
