= Isleham =

Village in Cambridgeshire, England

Coordinates: 52.33°N 0.4°E

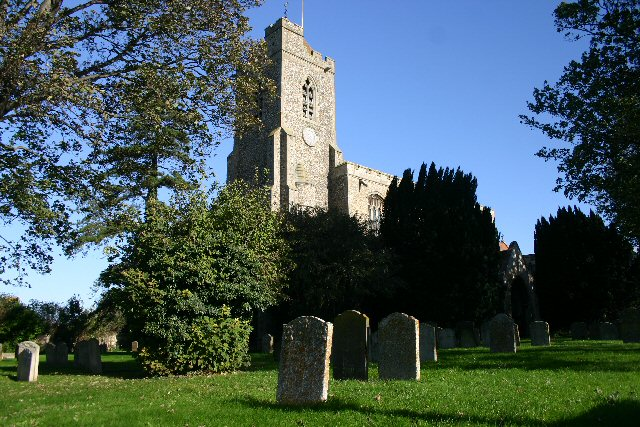
- St Andrew's Church

- Location within Cambridgeshire
- Population: 2,378 (2011)
- OS grid reference: TL644738
- District: East Cambridgeshire
- Shire county: Cambridgeshire
- Region: East
- Country: England
- Sovereign state: United Kingdom
- Post town: ELY
- Postcode district: CB7
- Dialling code: 01638

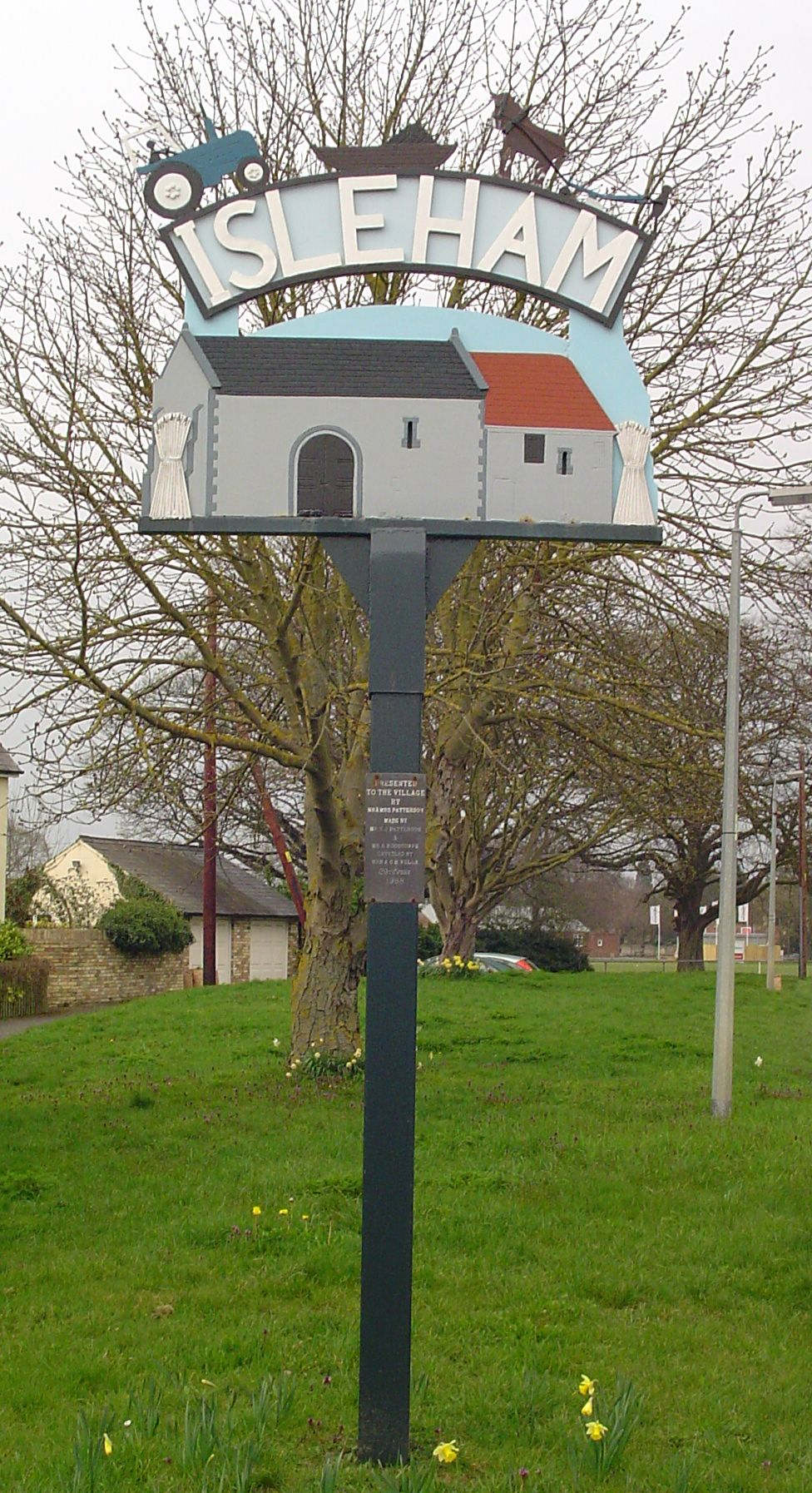
Isleham village sign

Isleham is a village and civil parish in the English county of Cambridgeshire. It is part of the Fens. It has three pubs.

== Geography ==
Isleham is located in the Fens of south-east Cambridgeshire. The western parish boundary is formed by the Crooked Ditch or Crooked Drain, the eastern boundary largely by the Lea Brook and the north by the River Lark. The village lies on the B1104 from Prickwillow to Chippenham. Isleham is twinned with Nesles in France and Magdala in Germany.

== Amenities ==
The village has a Co-op supermarket and Post Office. There are three public houses - The Griffin, The Merry Monk and the Rising Sun - and three churches: St Andrew's Church of England parish church, plfc (Pound Lane Free Church) and the Ark Church.

== Archaeology ==
The region between Devil's Dyke and the line between Littleport and Shippea Hill shows a remarkable amount of archaeological findings of the Stone Age, the Bronze Age and the Iron Age . Findings in Isleham include the Isleham Hoard of more than 6500 pieces of bronze, both manufactured articles and fragments of sheet bronze, all dating from the late Bronze Age, and discovered by Bill Houghton and his brother, Arthur.

== Genealogy ==
Following a landscaping project, plfc (Pound Lane Free Church) have made listings and photographs of the graveyard headstones available via an on-line library.

== History ==
Its name seems to come from Anglo-Saxon Gísla hám = "the home of the hostages". It seems that in Anglo-Saxon societies the position of a hostage from one political group held by another political group, was sometimes more or less voluntary, and the meaning of the word could slip into "representative".

The Priory of St Margaret of Antioch was founded in the village in 1090. It was always an alien priory run directly from France and, as such, was dissolved in 1414. It was later used as a barn and is now looked after by English Heritage.

St Andrew's parish church is a Grade I listed building. It was the burial site for ancestors of the Peyton family. Descendants of Peytons visit the church and obtain rubbings of the brasses decorating the Peyton monuments. The church continues to be restored with the help of donations from Peyton families in the UK and USA. Isleham Hall on West Street is a building associated with the Peyton family, and dating from the 16th century.

On 3 May 1850 Baptist preacher Charles Spurgeon was baptised in the river Lark. A stone marks the location.

== Culture ==
In 1975 Mary Chamberlain published the book Fenwomen, an account of the lives of women in the village of Gislea - which was a pseudonym for Isleham.

In 2015, English rapper Dirty Dike released his fourth album which included a track entitled "Isleham Swamp". Dirty Dike has referenced Cambridgeshire and the Fenland in several of his tracks.
