= William North, 6th Baron North =

English soldier, peer and Jacobite

Lieutenant-General The Right Honourable The Lord North and Grey
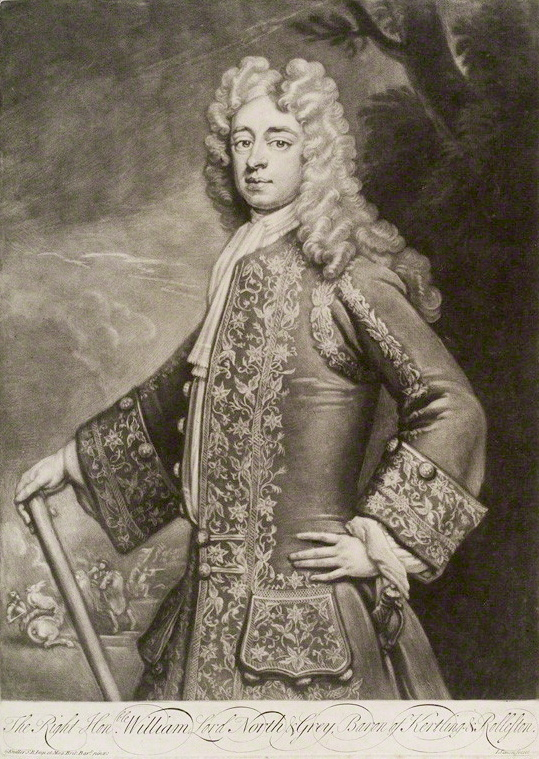
- Mezzotint after Sir Godfrey Kneller
- Born: William North; 22 December 1678; Caldecote, Cambridgeshire, England
- Died: 31 October 1734 (aged 55) Madrid, Spain

William North, 6th Baron North and 2nd Baron Grey (22 December 1678 – 31 October 1734), known as Lord North and Grey, was an English soldier and Jacobite, and a peer for more than forty years. He had the right to sit in the House of Lords between 1698 and 1734, although he spent the last twelve years of his life overseas.

North and Grey was the first of his family to become a professional soldier, and he rose to the rank of Lieutenant-General. His career faltered after the death of Queen Anne because he was known to be a Jacobite. After being arrested for his part in the Atterbury Plot, but released for lack of evidence, North and Grey took service in the army of King Philip V of Spain. He died in Madrid.

== Early life and family ==
North was born in Caldecote, Cambridgeshire, the son of Charles North, 5th Baron North (c. 1636–1691), by his marriage to a daughter of the first Baron Grey of Warke. He was the grandson of Dudley North, 4th Baron North (1602–1677). Four years before the death of his grandfather, his father had been created a peer in his own right and summoned to the House of Lords as Baron Grey of Rolleston, so that North inherited both titles on his father's death in 1691 and was known as Lord North and Grey.

He came from a more intellectual family than most peers of his day. His uncle Francis North became Lord Chancellor as Lord Guilford, while other uncles were Sir Dudley North, an economist, John North, master of Trinity College, Cambridge, and Roger North, a historian. His sister was the orientalist and linguist Dudleya North (1675–1712).

He was educated at Magdalene College, Cambridge and Foubert's Military Academy.

== Life ==
While aiming for a military career, North was considered too young to take part in the Williamite War in Ireland of 1689–1691. However, in 1691 he travelled to Flanders to fight as a "gentleman volunteer". In 1698 he took his seat in the House of Lords. He served for many years under the Duke of Marlborough, and at the Battle of Blenheim on 13 August 1704 he commanded Lord North and Grey's Regiment of Foot. During this battle, he lost his right hand. In 1710 he was promoted a Lieutenant General.

In 1705 North married the young Dutchwoman Maria Margaretha de Jonge van Ellemeet (1690–1762), a daughter of Cornelis de Jonge van Ellemeet (1646–1721), Receiver General of the Republic of the Seven United Netherlands.

Outside his military career, North served from 6 December 1711 until 28 October 1715 as Lord Lieutenant of Cambridgeshire, a position previously held by his ancestors the first, second, and third Barons North, and Queen Anne appointed him a member of her Privy Council. At the time of Anne's death in 1714, North was Governor of Portsmouth and favoured a Jacobite succession. His garrison consisted of Scots Guards, who were reported to drink the health of the claimant James Francis Edward Stuart every day. Amid fears that the Duke of Berwick would use Portsmouth as a base for a Jacobite invasion of England, North was speedily replaced by Thomas Erle. In 1720 he was elected a Fellow of the Royal Society and he was known to be a member of the Loyal Brotherhood.

In August 1721 North was arrested and accused of being part of the Atterbury Plot, a conspiracy led by Francis Atterbury aimed at the restoration of the House of Stuart. However, no one would give evidence against him, so he escaped the fates of some other conspirators and was released. His agent and legal advisor Christopher Layer was hanged, drawn and quartered. After his release, North travelled on the continent and was believed to have converted to Roman Catholicism. He was given an earldom in the Jacobite peerage as 'Earl North' on 6 January 1722. He then took service as a general in the army of King Philip V of Spain.

North died in Madrid on 31 October 1734, when he was succeeded in his estates and in the title of Baron North by a first cousin once removed, Francis North, 3rd Baron Guilford, the grandson of North's uncle Lord Chancellor North. The title of Baron Grey de Rolleston became extinct.

In 1735 North's widow married secondly Patrick Murray, 5th Lord Elibank.

Military offices
Preceded by Bevil Granville	Colonel of Lord North and Grey's Regiment of Foot; 1703–1715	Succeeded by Henry Grove
Preceded by Thomas Erle	Governor of Portsmouth; 1712–1714	Succeeded by Thomas Erle
Honorary titles
Preceded by The Duke of Bedford	Lord Lieutenant of Cambridgeshire; 1711–1715	Succeeded by The Earl of Orford
Peerage of England
New creation	— TITULAR — Earl North; Jacobite peerage 1722–1734	Extinct
Preceded by Charles North	Baron North; 1691–1734	Succeeded by Francis North
Preceded by Charles North	Baron Grey de Rolleston; 1691–1734	Extinct
