= Lord North (disambiguation) =

Lord North (1732–1792) was Prime Minister of Great Britain from 1770 to 1782.

Lord North may also refer to:

- Baron North, an abeyant title in the Peerage of England whose male holders were referred to as Lord North
  - Edward North, 1st Baron North (c. 1496–1564), lawyer, clerk in the House of Lords, and Privy Councillor
  - Roger North, 2nd Baron North (1530–1600), Treasurer of the Household for Elizabeth I
  - Dudley North, 3rd Baron North (1581–1666), politician, and one of few Lords who supported the Parliamentarians in the Civil War
  - Dudley North, 4th Baron North (1602–1677), Member of Parliament for Cambridgeshire in Short, Long, and Convention Parliaments
  - William North, 6th Baron North, 2nd Baron Grey (c. 1673–1734), soldier and Jacobite exile who fought for Spain
  - Francis North, 1st Earl of Guilford, 7th Baron North (1704–1790), politician and Queen Charlotte's treasurer
  - George North, 3rd Earl of Guilford, 9th Baron North (1757–1802) (abeyant 1802), son of the prime minister and politician
- Lord North Street, a street in Westminster, London
- Lord North Street, a London wealth management firm that merged to form Sandaire Investment Office in 2014
- Lord North (horse) (born 2016), winner of the 2020 Prince of Wales's Stakes

== See also ==
- Earl of Guilford
- Lord North's Conciliatory Proposition
