= Dudleya North =

English orientalist

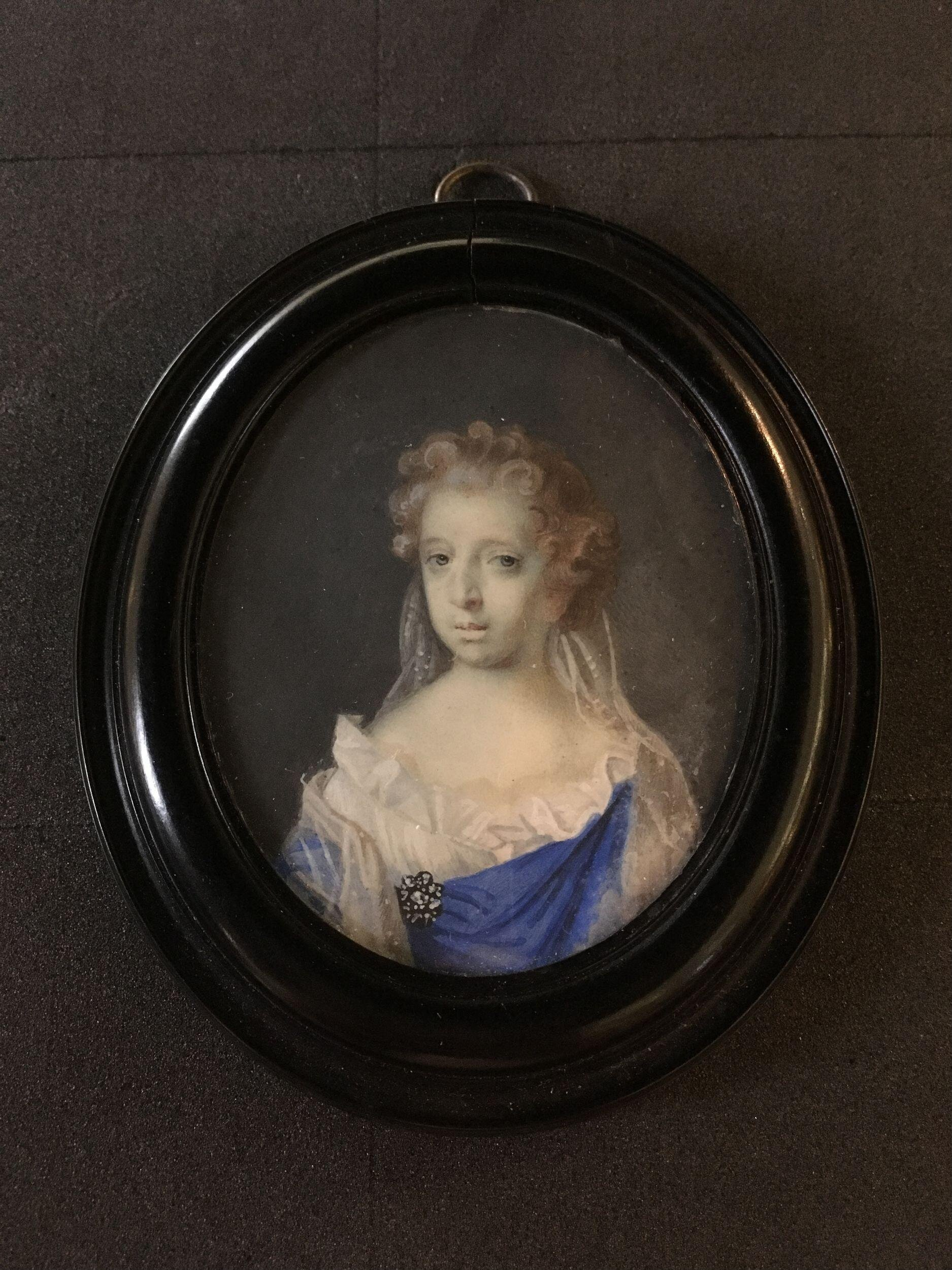
- portrait by Edmund Ashfield
- Born: July 1675; London
- Died: 25 April 1712 (aged 36–37)
- Occupation: Orientalist
- Parent(s): Charles North, 5th Baron North and 1st Baron Grey of Rolleston; Catharine Grey
- Relatives: William North, 6th Baron North

The Hon. Dudleya North (July 1675–25 April 1712) was an English aristocrat, orientalist, linguist and classical scholar.

== Early life ==
Dudleya North was born at the house of her father Charles North, 5th Baron North (c. 1636–1691) in Leicester Fields in London. Her mother Catherine was a daughter of the first Baron Grey of Werke and Dudleya was a granddaughter of Dudley North, 4th Baron North (1602–1677). Her brother was the soldier and Jacobite William North, the 6th Baron North. Four years before the death of her grandfather, her father had been created a peer in his own right and summoned to the House of Lords as Baron Grey of Rolleston.

She came of a more intellectual family than most aristocratic families of the day. Her uncle Francis North became Lord Chancellor as Lord Guilford, while other uncles were Sir Dudley North, an economist, John North, Master of Trinity College, Cambridge, and Roger North, a historian.

The younger of two daughters, at a young age she had a desire for learning and, unusually for the time, she was educated privately alongside her brothers by their tutors. A water colour portrait of her aged 15 from 1690 painted by Edmund Ashfield is held in the collection of the Victoria and Albert Museum.

== Career ==
A natural linguist, she quickly became fluent in Latin and Ancient Greek following which she began to study Hebrew and some eastern languages. After a 'long and severe course of study' she mastered 'a competent share of knowledge in the whole circle of Oriental learning' collecting in her personal library a number of non-western language books. Other than the fact that she was devoted to her brothers and to her studies little is known of her life. While Lord North intended for her to marry, apparently Dudleya was uninterested in such a prospect, preferring instead to keep to her books and her studies.

== Death ==
She died aged 36 on 25 April 1712 at the home of her sister-in-law on Bond Street in London of consumption brought on, it was said, by her diligent studies and 'sedentary distemper'. Dudleya North was buried on 2 May 1712 in the North family vault at Kirtling in Cambridgeshire.

== Legacy ==
Her uncle Roger North had set up a parochial library at Rougham in Norfolk and after her death he sorted out her affairs and added her books on oriental subjects and languages and her manuscripts to the collection. These are now kept in the Bodleian Library at Oxford and Norfolk Record Office.
