= Elizabeth Wiseman =

- Born: 4 January 1647; London
- Died: 1730 (aged 82–83)
- Occupation: noblewoman
- Known for: alleged breach of promise
- Children: none

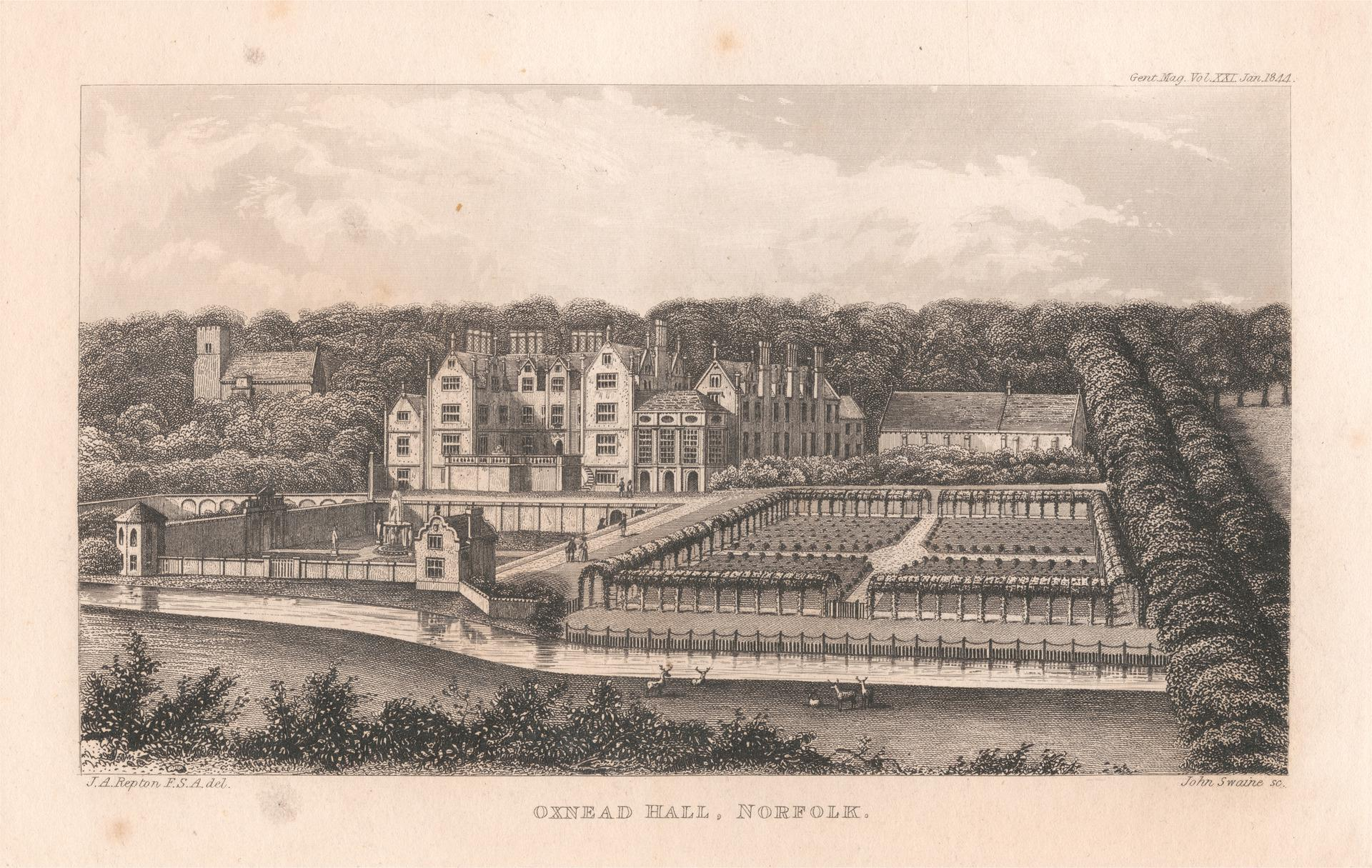
Oxnead Hall, seat of Countess Elizabeth North

Elizabeth Wiseman born Hon. Elizabeth North aka; Lady Wiseman and Elizabeth Paston, Countess of Yarmouth (4 January 1647 – 1730) was an English noblewoman and litigant. After her first marriage left her as a woman of property she found that she was a commodity which her own brother was keen to see married to advantage irrespective of her views.

== Life ==
Wiseman was born in London in 1647. Her mother was Anne (born Montagu) and her father was Dudley North, fourth Baron North. Her notable siblings included Francis North, 1st Baron Guilford, Roger North who was a lawyer and biographer and Professor John North who taught Greek at Cambridge.

She married the jurist Sir Robert Wiseman and after he died in 1684 she had £20,000 available to the man that married her. This led to a lot of interest and among the candidates was Robert Spencer who was backed by her eldest brother Charles North. Elizabeth disliked Robert Spencer, but Charles where arranged meetings where Robert would suddenly appear despite it being agreed that he would not be invited. Charles and his wife arranged for them to be in rooms together and they said that they had heard Robert and Elizabeth agree to marriage.

Elizabeth realised she was being used as a commodity. Charles wanted to see her remarried to his benefit. All of those involved including Elizabeth wrote about financial advantage in planning her new husband. She asked three of her other brothers to stand by her. They told her to move away and she went to lodge with her brother-in-law Sir George Wenyeve in Suffolk. Another potential marriage to Sir John Thorold was also put aside and Roger North took it upon himself to gather together the letters written by him and his brothers about the case. Roger believed there might be a breach of promise case and he wanted sufficient evidence to counter any such claim. There was a case at the Court of Arches and Robert Spenser and Charles North were required to recant their version of the events.

At about the same time, Peter Lely, created a portrait of her, painted for by her brother Francis. There are lots of Lely's paintings of women where the subject is no longer known. Her painting may be one of those.

Elizabeth avoided her prospective suitors by marrying the Earl William Paston in March 1687. He had been made the treasurer of the household the month before and he had inherited the title of second earl of Yarmouth four years before. In 1690 her husband, who supported the usurped James II, was in the tower and she wrote to Queen Mary for permission to live with him there.

== Death and legacy ==
She died in 1730. By this time her husband, William Paston, 2nd Earl of Yarmouth, was poor. He would die a bankrupt in 1732. Her case with Robert Spencer is the scholarly subject of Mary Chan's book, Life into Story: Courtship of Elizabeth Wiseman, in 1998.
