= George North (diplomat) =

English diplomat

George North (fl. 1561–1581) was an English diplomat sent to Sweden in 1564, known also as a man of letters. His unpublished work A Brief Discourse of Rebellion and Rebels has been claimed as an important source for the plays of William Shakespeare.

== Works ==
North, who described himself as "gentleman" in his books, had Sir Christopher Hatton as patron. He published:

- The Description of Swedland, Gotland, and Finland, the auncient estate of theyr Kynges, the most horrible and incredible tiranny of the second Christiern, kyng of Denmarke, agaynst the Swecians. … Collected … oute of Sebastian Mounster (London, by John Awdeley), 1561; dedicated to Thomas Steuckley, esq. Close to a verbatim translation of the Cosmographia of Sebastian Münster.
- The Philosopher of the Court, written by Philbert of Vienna in Champaigne, and Englished by George North, gentleman … London, by Henry Binneman for Lucas Harrison and George Byshop, Anno 1575; dedicated to Christopher Hatton, with prefatory verses by John Daniell and William Hitchcock, gent. Translation of Le Philosophe de Court by Philibert de Vienne. The original had a satirical intent. It has been argued that North missed that point.
- The Stage of Popish Toyes; conteining both tragicall and comicall partes, played by the Romishe roysters of former age, notably describing them by degrees in their colours … collected out of H. Stephanus in his Apologie upon Herodotus, compyled by G. N. (London, by Henry Binneman), 1581; dedicated to Sir Christopher Hatton. Based on Henri Estienne.

The manuscript A Brief Discourse of Rebellion and Rebells is described in a 20th-century bookseller's catalogue, and dated c. 1576. It is dedicated to "Sir Roger North" (Roger North, 2nd Baron North), and praises his brother Thomas North. The suggestion is that these were relatives. The suggestion is also there, that North's poems on Owain Glyndŵr and Jack Cade should be compared to Shakespeare's dramatic treatments of these figures. An edition was published in 2018, by Dennis McCarthy and June Schlueter, as "A Brief Discourse of Rebellion and Rebels" by George North: A Newly Uncovered Manuscript Source for Shakespeare's Plays. They identify the manuscript as an important source for Shakespeare's plays and note that the manuscript is now in the British Library, is dated to 1576, and was written by North at Kirtling Hall.
