= Hugh Duberly =

British farmer, campaigner and politician

Sir Hugh Duberly KCVO CBE
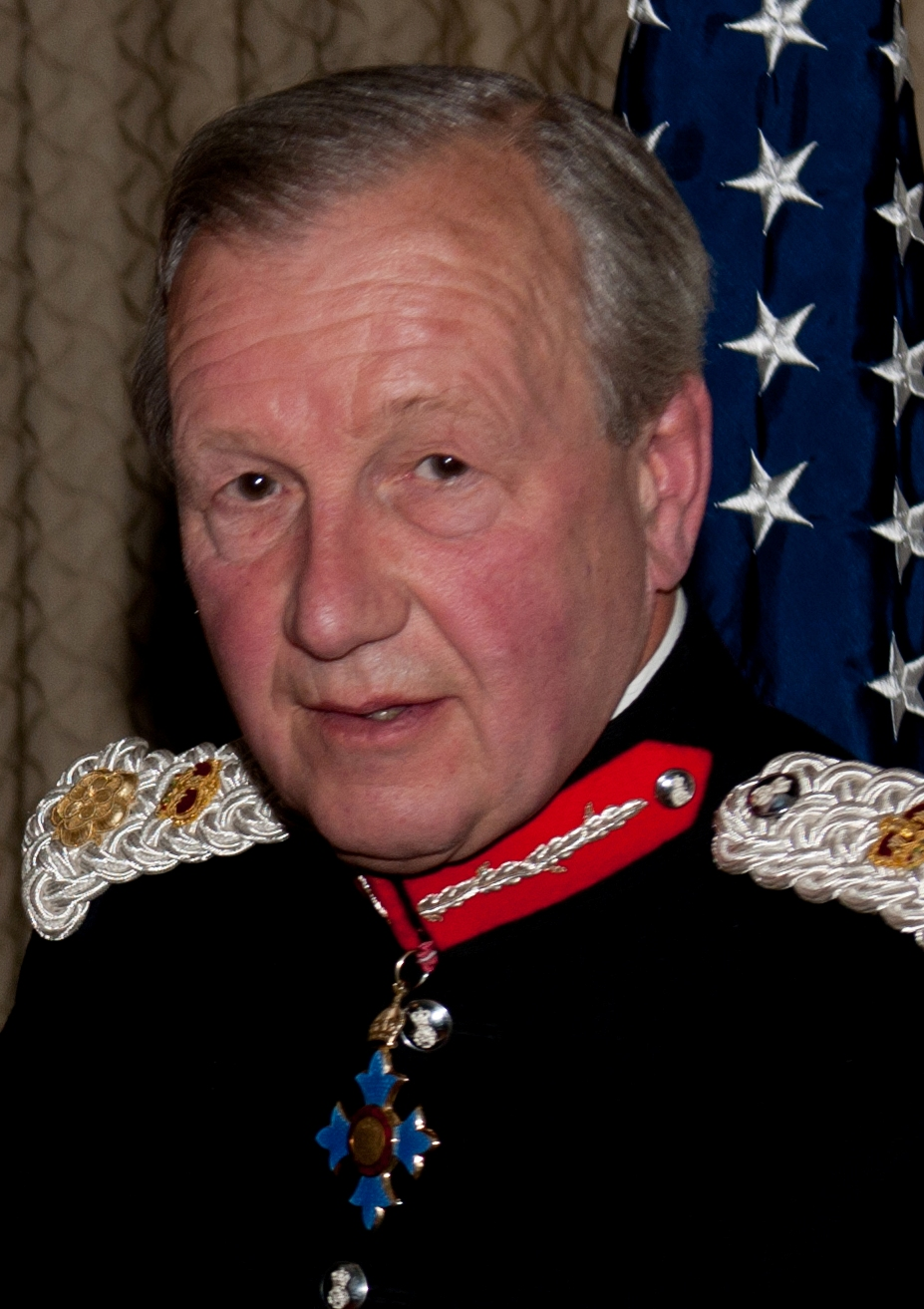
- 2012 Image of Hugh Duberly
- Born: 4 April 1942 (age 83)
- Occupations: farmer, campaigner and politician
- Years active: 1979–2004
- Known for: independent local councillor for Great Staughton
- Awards: Commander of the Order of the British Empire, Knight Commander of the Royal Victorian Order

Sir Archibald Hugh Duberly KCVO CBE (born 4 April 1942), is a British farmer, campaigner and politician.

Duberly was elected as an independent local councillor for Staughton in Huntingdonshire from 1979 until 2004. During that time, Sir Hugh was President of the Country Landowners' Association, serving from 1993 to 1995.

Sir Hugh was a Commissioner of the Crown Estate for seven years between 2002 and 2009, when he was replaced by Gareth Baird. He is the President of the East of England Agricultural Society for 2015/16.

Sir Hugh was appointed a Deputy Lieutenant for Cambridgeshire in 1989. He served as High Sheriff of Cambridgeshire for 1991–92. He took over from James Crowden as Lord Lieutenant of Cambridgeshire in 2003, serving in the position until 4 April 2017 upon his replacement by Julie Spence. He served on the board of trustees of the disability charity The Papworth Trust from 1992 as a member, and from 1997 as chair, until 2012, when he retired and was replaced by Rob Hammond. He was Chairman of the Governors at Kimbolton School from 1992 to 2000.

Sir Hugh was appointed a Commander of the Order of the British Empire in the 1996 Birthday Honours, and as a Knight Commander of the Royal Victorian Order in the 2015 Birthday Honours.

Honorary titles
Preceded by Nigel Stewart Elgood	High Sheriff of Cambridgeshire; 1991–1992	Succeeded by Godfrey Richard Warde Wright
Preceded by James Crowden	Lord Lieutenant of Cambridgeshire; 2003–2017	Succeeded by Julie Spence
