= Baron North =

Title of nobility

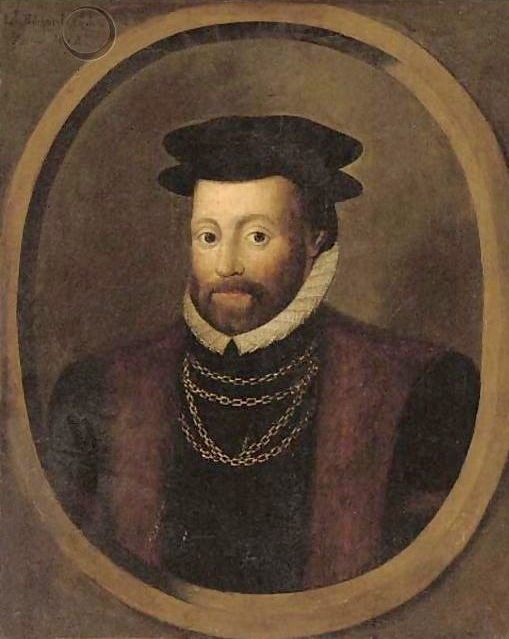
Edward North, 1st Baron North.

Baron North, of Kirtling Tower in the County of Cambridge, is an abeyant title in the Peerage of England. Its most famous holder was Frederick North, 2nd Earl of Guilford, 8th Baron North, who served as Prime Minister of Great Britain from 1770 to 1782, a period which included most of the American Revolutionary War.

== History ==
The title was created on 17 January 1554 for Sir Edward North, a successful lawyer, clerk of the Parliament and chancellor of the Court of Augmentations. The barony was created by writ, which means that it can descend through both male and female lines. Lord North was succeeded by his son Roger, the second Baron. He was English ambassador to France, Treasurer of the Household and Lord-Lieutenant of Cambridgeshire. On his death, the title passed to his grandson Dudley, the third Baron. He was also Lord-Lieutenant of Cambridgeshire. He was succeeded by his son, also named Dudley, the fourth Baron. He represented Horsham and Cambridgeshire in the House of Commons. His second son the Hon. Sir Francis North was created Baron Guilford in 1683.

Lord North was succeeded by his eldest son, the fifth Baron. He married a daughter of the first Baron Grey of Warke and in 1673, four years before he succeeded his father, he was raised to the Peerage of England in his own right as Baron Grey, of Rolleston in the County of Stafford. He was succeeded in both peerages by his son, the sixth Baron. He served as Lord-Lieutenant of Cambridgeshire. He was created a Jacobite peer as 'Earl North' on 6 January 1722. He was childless and on his death in 1734 the Jacobite earldom (such as it was) and the barony of Grey became extinct. He was succeeded in the barony of North by his cousin the third Baron Guilford, who became the seventh Baron North as well. In 1752 he was created Earl of Guilford in the Peerage of Great Britain. The barony of North remained a subsidiary title of the earldom until the death of his grandson, the third Earl, in 1802. He had no sons and was succeeded in the barony of Guilford and earldom by his younger brother (see the Earl of Guilford for later history of these titles). The barony of North, meanwhile, fell into abeyance between his daughters.

The peerage remained in abeyance for thirty-nine years, until the abeyance was terminated in 1841 in favour of the late Earl's second daughter Susan North, who became the tenth holder. She was the wife of John North, a Colonel in the Army and Member of Parliament. Born John Doyle, he had assumed the surname of North in lieu of Doyle in 1838. The title descended in the direct line until the death of her great-great-grandson, the thirteenth Baron (who had succeeded his grandfather), in 1941. Lord North was killed in action as a member of the crew of HMS Neptune. On his death, the barony fell into abeyance between his two sisters, Dorothy Anne Graham (1915–2011) and Susan Silence Beauchamp (1920–1999).

== Barons North (1554) ==
- Edward North, 1st Baron North (c. 1496–1564)
- Roger North, 2nd Baron North (1530–1600)
  - Hon. Sir John North (d. 1597)
- Dudley North, 3rd Baron North (1581–1666)
- Dudley North, 4th Baron North (1602–1677)
- Charles North, 5th Baron North, 1st Baron Grey (c. 1636–1691)
- William North, 6th Baron North, 2nd Baron Grey (also Earl North in the Jacobite Peerage)(c. 1673–1734)
- Francis North, 1st Earl of Guilford, 7th Baron North (1704–1790)
- Frederick North, 2nd Earl of Guilford, 8th Baron North (1732–1792)
- George Augustus North, 3rd Earl of Guilford, 9th Baron North (1757–1802) (abeyant 1802)
- Susan North, 10th Baroness North (1797–1884) (abeyance terminated 1841)
- William Henry John North, 11th Baron North (1836–1932)
- William Frederick John North, 12th Baron North (1860–1938)
- John Dudley North, 13th Baron North (1917–1941) (abeyant 1941)

== Notes ==
=== Bibliography ===
- Kidd, Charles; Williamson, David, eds. (1990). Debrett's Peerage and Baronetage. London and New York: St Martin's Press.
- leighrayment.com
- Mosley, Charles (2002). The Peerage and Baronetage of Great Britain and Ireland (106th ed.). London: Cassells.
- Mosley, Charles (2010). The Peerage and Baronetage of Great Britain and Ireland (107th ed.). London: Cassells.
