= Rougham, Norfolk =

Village in Norfolk, England

Coordinates: 52.75073°N 0.71149°E

Rougham
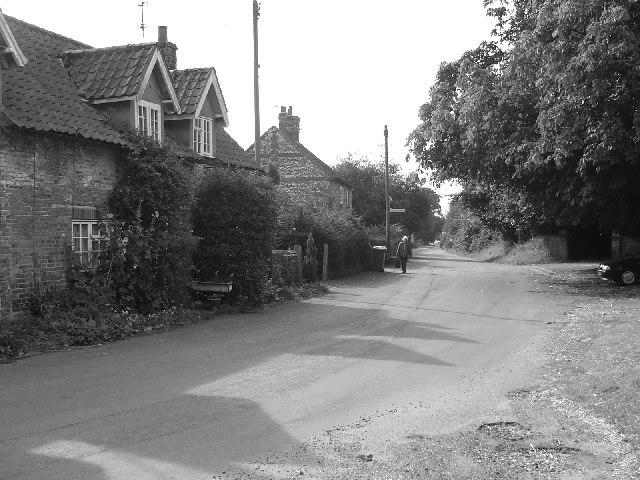
- The street, Rougham

- Location within Norfolk
- Area: 10.85 km^{2} (4.19 sq mi)
- Population: 141 (2011)
  - Density: 13/km^{2} (34/sq mi)
- OS grid reference: TF830204
- District: Breckland
- Shire county: Norfolk
- Region: East
- Country: England
- Sovereign state: United Kingdom
- Post town: King's Lynn
- Postcode district: PE32
- Dialling code: 01328
- Police: Norfolk
- Fire: Norfolk
- Ambulance: East of England

Rougham is a village and civil parish in the English county of Norfolk. It covers an area of 10.85 km^{2} (4.19 sq mi) and had a population of 152 in 69 households at the 2001 census, reducing to a population of 141 at the 2011 Census in 55 households. For the purposes of local government, it falls within the district of Breckland.

== Buildings of note ==
The local Church is Saint Mary's, a Perpendicular church dating from the 14th century, that was partly rebuilt in 1913. It contains a number of monuments to the Yelverton family.

Rougham Hall is a Grade II listed manor house, a largely 19th-century building on the site of the former Jacobean manor. During its restoration in 1878 it had added to it a staircase dated from circa 1700 taken from Finborough Hall, in Suffolk. It is the ancestral home of the North family, descendants of Dudley North, 4th Baron North, and his son, the lawyer Roger North. The latter set up a parochial library at Rougham which contained the books and manuscripts of his late niece, the orientalist and linguist Dudleya North.

== Toponymy ==
The name "Rougham" is derived from the old English Ruhham, with ruh probably meaning rough ground, and ham, meaning village.
