= François de Prendcourt =

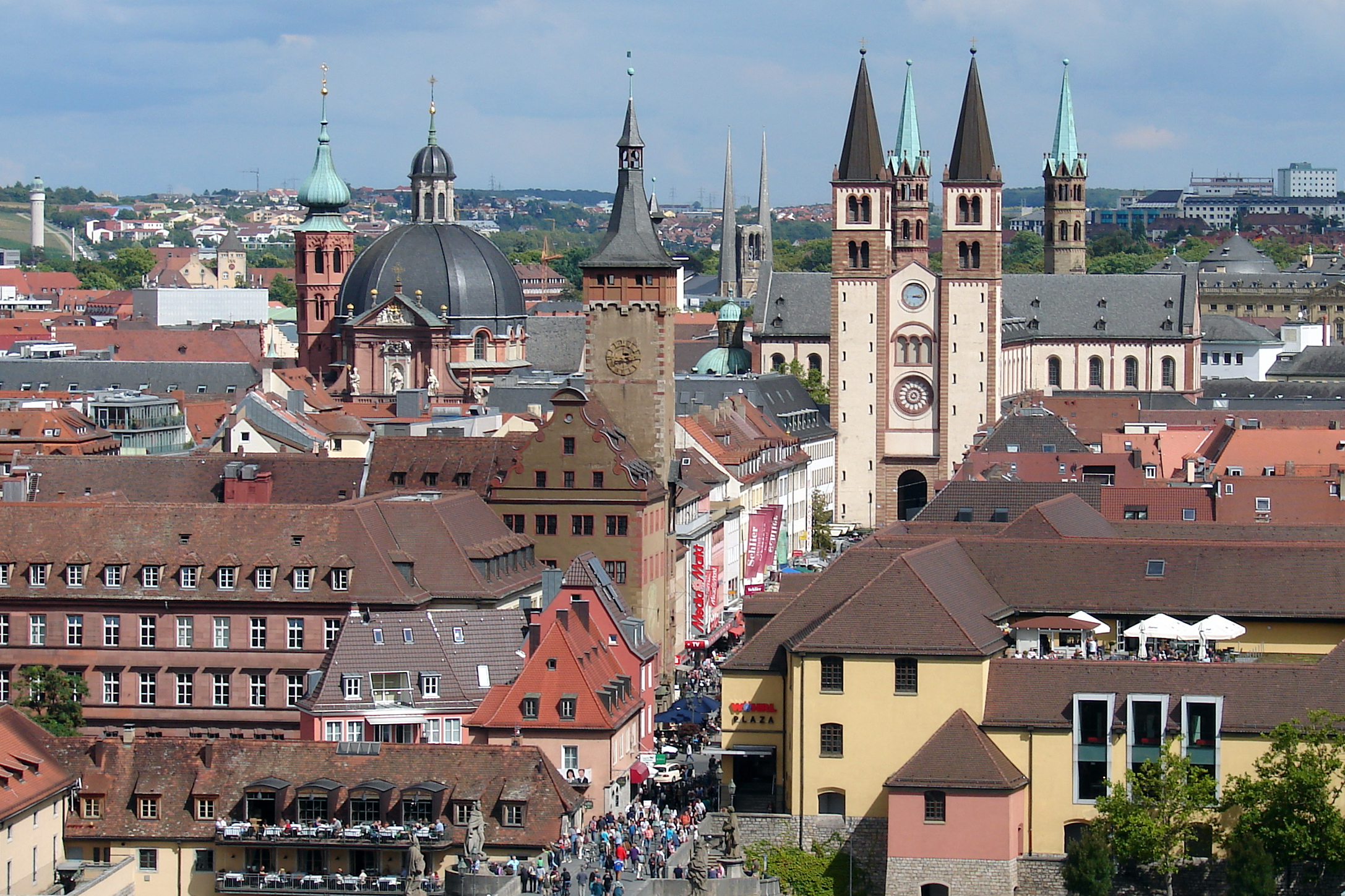
Prendcourt's hometown of Würzburg, Germany

François de Prendcourt (born Gutenberg von Weigolshausen; 1640s – 1725) was a German composer, organist, harpsichordist, and soldier.

Little is known of Prendcourt's early life and education. He was born in Würzburg and spoke German, French, Spanish, Latin, and English. From 1686 to 1688 he was Master of the Children at the Catholic chapel in Whitehall, England under James II, where he taught Latin, music, and singing. He was dismissed for misconduct, probably for having an affair with the daughter of Richard Bishop, whom he later married. The couple went to Ireland, and in 1689 Prendcourt was made military governor of the town of Armagh and held the rank of lieutenant. Arrested for espionage, he was imprisoned in the Bastille from the spring of 1690 to the autumn of 1697.

Upon his release, he was probably employed at the Catholic chapel of the Duke of Tallard in London, who at the time was the French ambassador. However, Tallard was expelled from London in 1702, and Prendcourt began teaching harpsichord to support himself. He was given room and board in several households, but gained a bad reputation by selling the furnishings of his rooms. Thomas Coke, Vice-Chamberlain to Queen Anne, hired him in 1705 to arrange music and correspond with the Duke of Tallard. Then in 1709 he was hired by Roger North to teach his children; North reports that Prendcourt was conceited and arrogant, and would only perform his own compositions. Prendcourt was appointed organist of All Saints’ Church in Newcastle upon Tyne in 1714, for which he was paid £12 a year. He apparently held this job the remainder of his life, and was buried there September 12, 1725.

Prendcourt sometimes referred to himself as a captain, but there is no evidence that he attained a rank higher than lieutenant. Referring to his technique on the organ, North stated that

His graces [i.e., ornaments] were clear, true descant, and harmonious; his movement distinct and swift; but this latter he aided by an undue slurr of the keys, which the eye would catch, sooner than the ear. In a word, as he knew how to set forth all musik to the best advantage, so upon those noble instruments he would doe wonders, and to use the words of the poet, elevate and surprise his hearers.

Although apparently a prolific composer and arranger, a single manuscript volume of harpsichord music known to be by Prendcourt survives, which consists of twenty-four pieces arranged in four suites. The manuscript is currently held by the cathedral of York. However, Matthew Spring believes that some of the pieces in the Poznań manuscript (discovered in Poland in 1979) may be by Prendcourt. Prendcourt also wrote a treatise on harpsichord technique and figured bass, which was transcribed by North.
