= Dudley North (economist) =

English merchant, politician, economist and writer

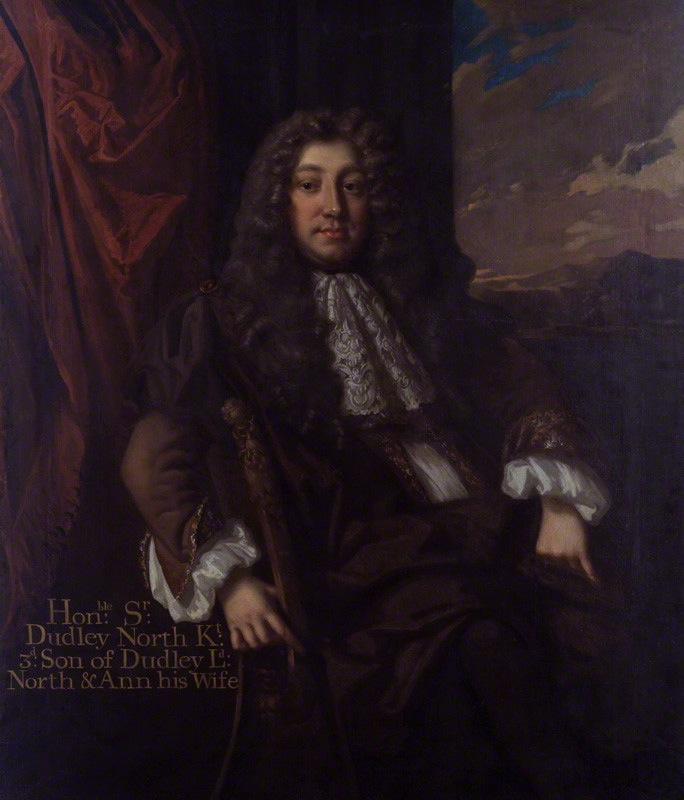
Sir Dudley North (1641–1691)

Sir Dudley North (16 May 1641 in Westminster – 31 December 1691 in London) was an English merchant, politician, economist and writer on free trade. He was also a member of the North family.

== Life ==
He was the fourth son of Baron Dudley North of Kirtling Tower and Anne Montagu, daughter of Sir Charles Montagu of Boughton House. In his early years he was carried off by Gypsies but was recovered by his family. He was the brother of Lord Chancellor Francis North, 1st Baron Guilford and Roger North, the Solicitor General of the Duke of York, and Attorney General of Queen Mary of Modena of the House of Este. His nephew was Lt. Gen. William North, 6th Baron North, who fought under Prince John Churchill, 1st Duke of Marlborough of Blenheim Palace, named after the Battle of Blenheim in which North fought.

Dudley engaged in foreign trade, especially with Turkey, and spent a number of years at Constantinople and Smyrna. Having returned to London with a fortune, he continued to trade with the Levant. His knowledge of commerce attracted the attention of the government, and he was further recommended by the influence of his brother Lord Guilford. During the Tory reaction under Charles II he was one of the sheriffs forced on the city of London in 1683 with an express view to securing verdicts for the crown in state trials.

He was knighted in 1683, and was appointed a commissioner of customs, and later of the treasury, and then again of the customs. Having been elected a member of parliament in 1685 for Banbury under James II, he took, says Roger North, the place of manager for the crown in all matters of revenue. After the Glorious Revolution he was called to account for his alleged unconstitutional proceedings in his office of sheriff.

He was buried in St Andrew's Church at Little Glemham in Suffolk. A memorial on the east wall of the chancel lies nearby.

== Family ==
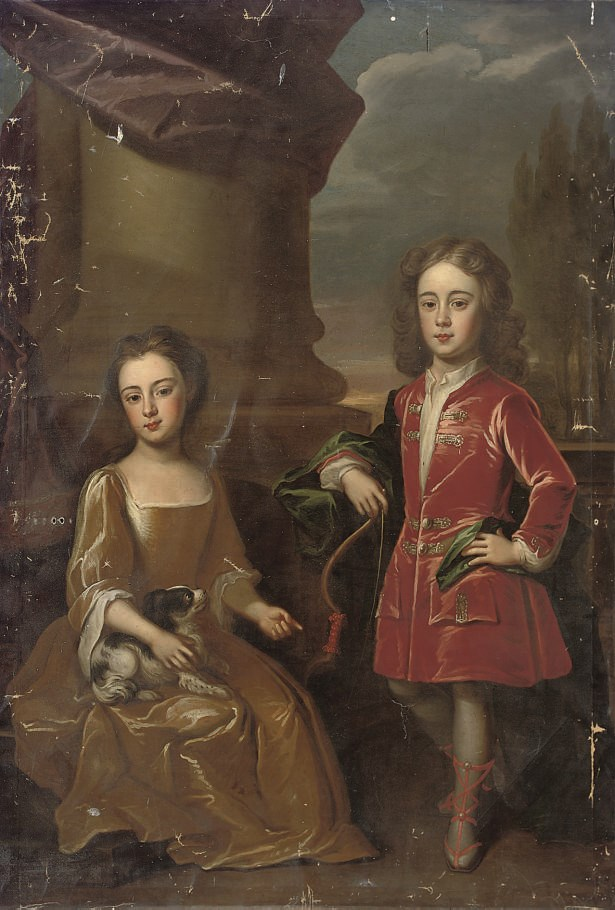
Double portrait of Dudley North (1684–1730), with his sister Anne

He had married Anne, the daughter of Sir Robert Cann, 1st Baronet of Compton Greenfield, Gloucestershire, and the widow of Sir Robert Gunning of Cold Ashton, Gloucestershire. They had one surviving son, Dudley North, who succeeded to Glemham, and married Katherine Yale, daughter of Gov. Elihu Yale of Yale College.

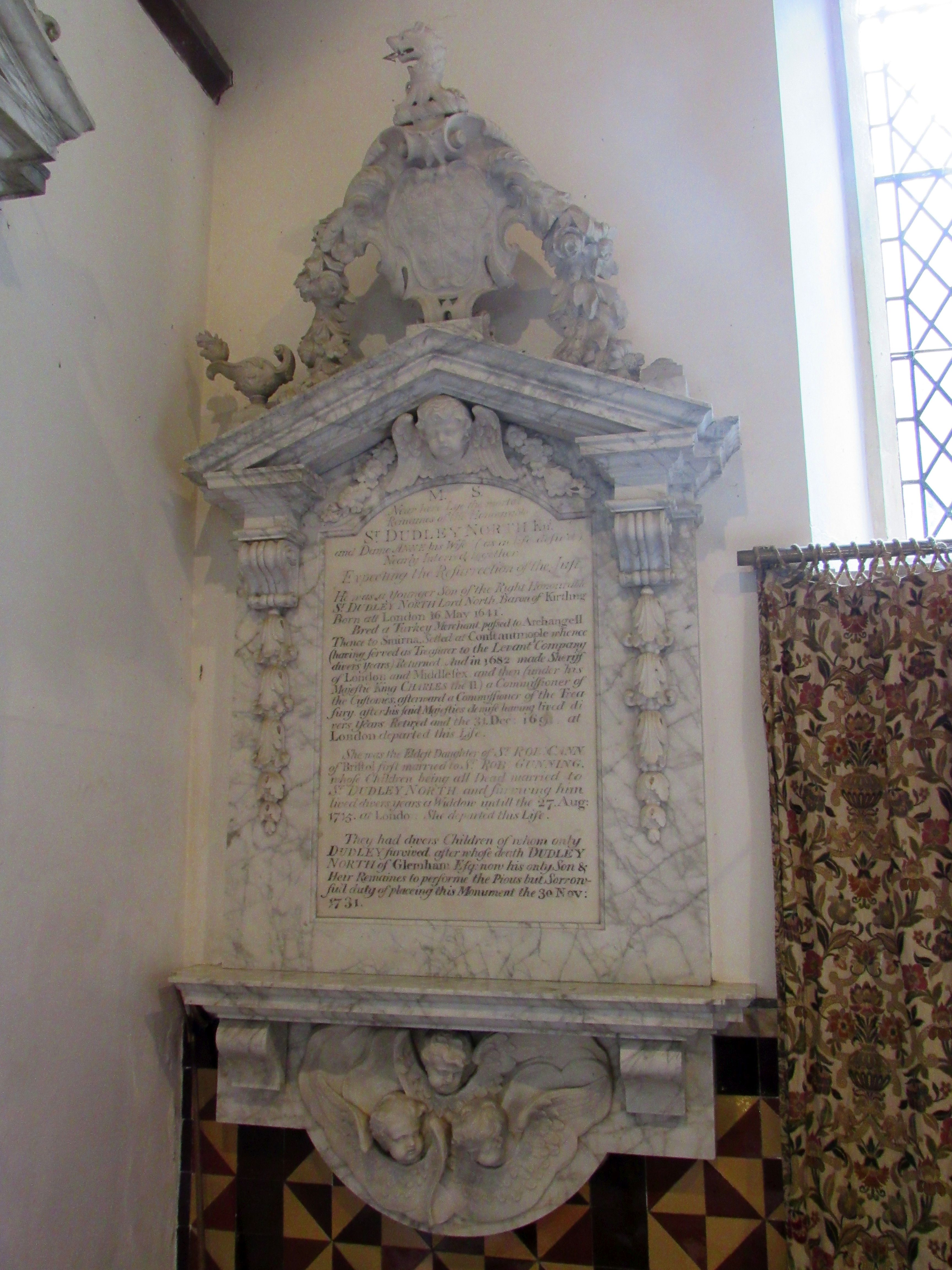
Dudley North memorial in St Andrew's Church, Little Glemham

== Works ==
Some notices of the manners and customs of the east were printed from his papers by his brother.

His tract entitled Discourses upon Trade, principally directed to the cases of the interest, coinage, clipping and increase of money, was published anonymously in 1691, and was edited in 1856 by J. R. McCulloch in the Select Collection of Early English Tracts on Commerce printed by the Political Economy Club of London. In this assertion of the free-trade doctrine against the system of prohibitions which had gained strength by the Revolution, North shows that wealth may exist independently of gold or silver, its source being human industry, applied either to the cultivation of the soil or to manufactures. It is a mistake to suppose that stagnation of trade arises from want of money; it must arise either from a glut of the home market, or from a disturbance of foreign commerce, or from diminished consumption caused by poverty. The export of money in the course of traffic, instead of diminishing, increases the national wealth, trade being only an exchange of superfluities. Nations are related to the world just in the same way as cities to the state or as families to the city. North emphasizes more than his predecessors the value of the home trade.

With respect to the interest of capital, he maintains that it depends, like the price of any commodity, on the proportion of supply and demand, and that a low rate is a result of the relative increase of capital, and cannot be brought about by arbitrary regulations, as had been proposed by Sir Josiah Child and others. In arguing the question of free trade, he urges that every advantage given to one interest over another is injurious to the public. No trade is unprofitable to the public; if it were, it would be given up; when trades thrive, so does the public, of which they form a part. Prices must determine themselves, and cannot be fixed by law; and all forcible interference with them does harm instead of good. No people can become rich by state regulations, only by peace, industry, freedom and unimpeded economic activity.

North was named by Wilhelm Roscher as one of the triumvirate of the 17th century English school of economists to the foremost place in Europe, the others being John Locke and William Petty.

== Notes ==
Parliament of England
Preceded by Sir John Holman, Bt	Member of Parliament for Banbury; 1685–1689	Succeeded by Sir Robert Dashwood, Bt
