= Thomas North =

English translator and lawyer (1535–c.1604)

Sir Thomas North
- Born: 28 May 1535; London
- Died: 1604 (aged 68–69); London
- Education: Peterhouse, Cambridge
- Occupations: Justice of the Peace, author and translator
- Known for: Translating Plutarch's Lives into English
- Parent(s): Edward North, 1st Baron North, Alice Brockenden
- Relatives: Roger North, 2nd Baron North (brother); Alice Arden in Arden of Faversham (half-sister); Elizabeth North (daughter); Christina North, Mary North (sisters)

Sir Thomas North (28 May 1535 – c. 1604) was an English translator, military officer, lawyer, and justice of the peace. His translation into English of Plutarch's Parallel Lives is notable for being the main source text used by William Shakespeare for his Roman plays. He was the second son of Edward North, the 1st Baron North, and brother to Roger North. He maintained a long literary career, spanning four decades, but likely faced financial difficulties later in life due to receiving little inheritance. It has recently been hypothesised that all of his published translations may have influenced the Shakespearean theatrical canon, and that he may himself have known William Shakespeare.

== Life ==
Thomas North was born between 9 and 10 o'clock at night on Friday, 28 May 1535, in the parish of St Alban, Wood Street, in the City of London. He was the second son of the Edward North, 1st Baron North.

Thomas likely studied at Peterhouse, Cambridge. In 1555, during the reign of the Catholic Queen Mary, he travelled in an embassy to Rome with Thomas Thirlby, Bishop of Ely (c. 1506-1570), Anthony Browne, Sir Edward Carne (c. 1500-1561), and Viscount Montague (1552-1592). Their mission was to reconcile England with the Pope, and North kept a journal of his travels.

In 1557, Thomas became Master of the Revels at Lincoln's Inn. In 1560, North was praised by Jasper Heywood in his translation of Seneca's Thyestes for his "stately style" and "goodly grace". Heywood then listed him with other well-known writers at the Inns of Court, Thomas Sackville, 1st Earl of Dorset, and Christopher Yelverton. North may have written plays for Leicester's Men and his brother's accounts include a payment that may indicate that he put on a play with this troupe at court in 1580.

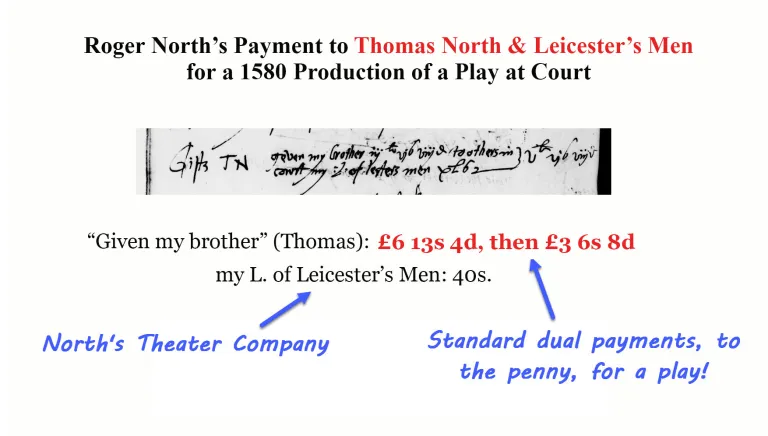
Roger pays both Thomas and Leicester’s Men for a play performed at court in 1580

In 1574, Thomas accompanied his brother, Roger, 2nd Lord North, on a diplomatic mission to the French court in Lyon. He served as captain of a band of footmen in Ireland in 1580, fought with the Earl of Leicester in the Low Countries in 1587, was appointed to defend the Isle of Ely in the year of the Armada, and was knighted in France in October of 1591 by the Earl of Essex, just before the Siege of Rouen. He returned to Ireland to help quell Tyrone's Rebellion in 1596.

His daughter, Elizabeth North, was posited as the inspiration for a character in Edmund Spenser's The Shepheardes Calender by Percy Long in 1905. This identification is based on the commonalities between this poem's "Rosalinde", and North's daughter who lived with her powerful uncle, Roger North, 2nd Baron North, at his estate of Kirtling Tower. As Long notes, Spenser admits the name Rosalinde was an anagram, and her name resolves to Elisa Nord: Elisa being a shortened version of Elizabeth, and Nord being French for North.

His name is on the roll of justices of the peace for Cambridge in 1592 and again in 1597. He was presented with a reward of £25 for his part in putting down Essex's Rebellion in 1601, and received a small pension (£40 a year) from Queen Elizabeth that same year.

== Translations ==
=== Guevara ===
His first translation, of Guevara's Reloj de Principes (commonly known as Libro áureo), was published in 1557. It is a compendium of moral counsels chiefly compiled from the Meditations of Marcus Aurelius, under the title of Diall of Princes. The English of this work is one of the earliest specimens of the ornate, copious and pointed style for which educated young Englishmen had acquired a taste in their Continental travels and studies.

North translated from a French copy of Guevara, but seems to have been well acquainted with the Spanish version. Marcus Aurelius had already been translated by John Bourchier, 2nd Baron Berners, but without reproducing the rhetorical artifices of the original. North's version, with its mannerisms and its constant use of antithesis, set the fashion which was to culminate in John Lyly's Euphues.

Linguistic evidence suggests that The Dial of Princes is a possible source for some passages in Titus Andronicus by William Shakespeare. Other biographical and historical parallels have led to the suggestion that North may have been the author of the now-lost play Titus and Vespasian, written in 1562, and that this was in turn the source for Shakespeare's own Titus Andronicus. Phrases from North's Dial of Princes may also appear in Shakespeare’s Hamlet.

=== Eastern fables ===
His next work was The Morall Philosophie of Doni (1570), a translation of an Italian language version of originally Indian fables, popularly known as The Fables of Bidpai which had come to Europe primarily through Arabic translations.

=== Plutarch's Lives ===
North published his translation of Plutarch in 1580, basing it on the French version by Jacques Amyot. The first edition was dedicated to Queen Elizabeth, and was followed by another edition in 1595. A third edition of his Plutarch was published, in 1603, with more translated Parallel Lives, and a supplement of other translated biographies.

North's Plutarch was reprinted for the Tudor Translations (1895), with an introduction by George Wyndham.

According to the Encyclopædia Britannica Eleventh Edition, "[i]t is almost impossible to overestimate the influence of North's vigorous English on contemporary writers, and some critics have called him the first master of English prose".

=== Shakespeare and North ===
The Lives translation formed the source from which Shakespeare drew the materials for his Julius Caesar, Coriolanus, Timon of Athens, and Antony and Cleopatra. It is in the last-named play that he follows the Lives most closely, whole speeches being taken directly from North. Some have hypothesized that North wrote plays later adapted by Shakespeare.
