= Upend =

Hamlet in Cambridgeshire, England

Coordinates: 52.19°N 0.49°E

- Location within Cambridgeshire
- Population: 70
- OS grid reference: TL705575
- Shire county: Cambridgeshire
- Region: East
- Country: England
- Sovereign state: United Kingdom
- Post town: Newmarket
- Postcode district: CB8
- Website: www.kirtlingandupend.org

Upend is a hamlet in the east of Cambridgeshire, England. It is five miles (8.0 km) south-east of Newmarket and lies in the same parish as Kirtling. Until the 15th century Upend was called Upheme which is old English for "the up-dwelling". Upend may once have been a separate village but it had been absorbed into Kirtling at some time before 1066.

The population of Upend in 2013 was 70. As the population at the 2011 census was less than 100 the population is included in the civil parish of Kirtling.
