= Brian Tuke =

Secretary of Henry VIII and Cardinal Wolsey

Sir Brian Tuke
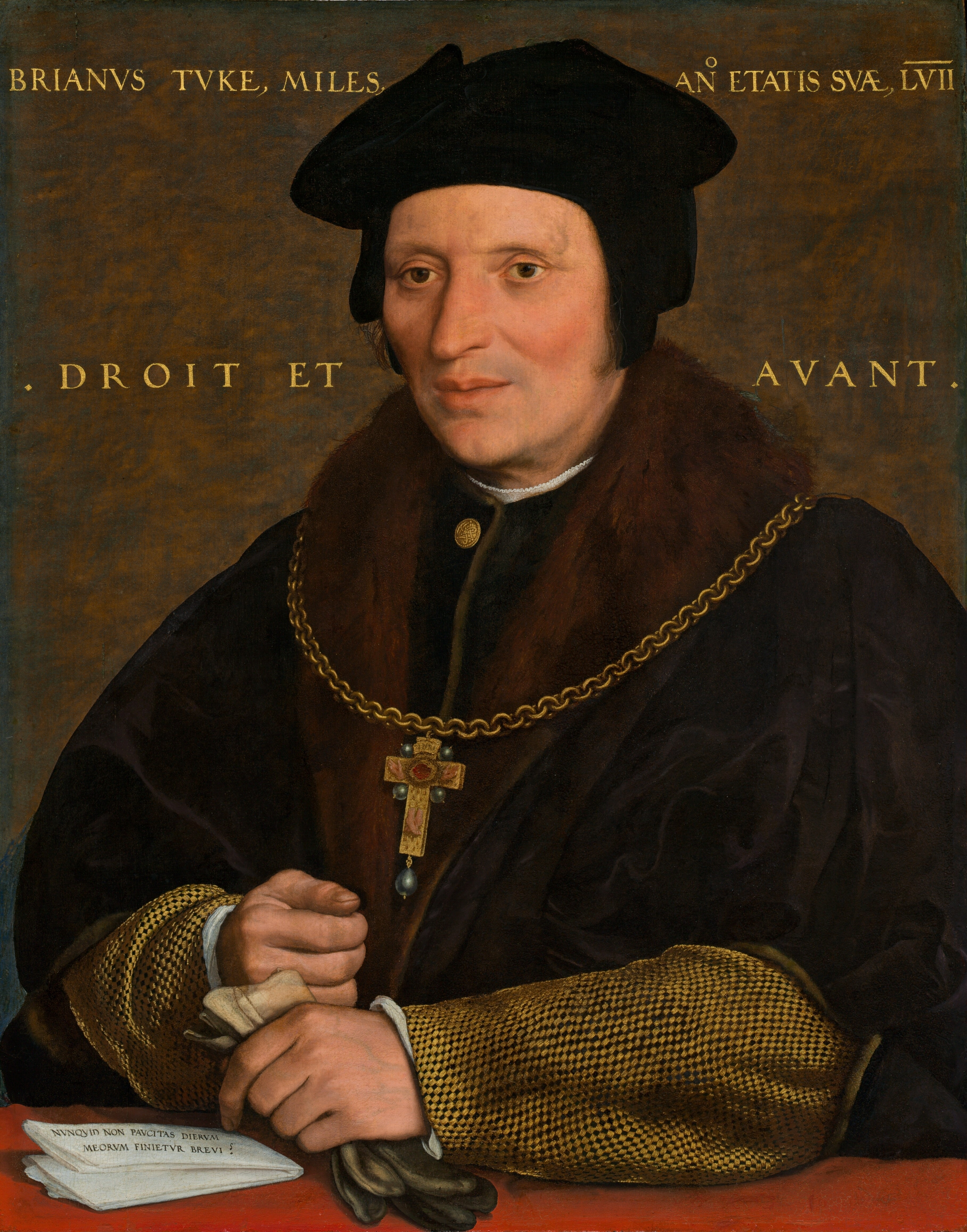
- Brian Tuke portrait by Hans Holbein c. 1527

Governor of the King's Posts
- In office 1517–1545
- Monarch: Henry VIII
- Succeeded by: John Mason

Clerk of the Signet
- In office 1509 – 17 April 1523
- Monarch: Henry VIII

Clerk of the Parliament
- In office 17 April 1523 – 1531
- Monarch: Henry VIII
- Preceded by: John Taylor
- Succeeded by: Sir Edward North

Personal details
- Born: approx. 1470
- Died: 26 October 1545 Layer Marney, Essex, England
- Resting place: St Margaret Lothbury
- Spouse: Grissell Boughton (died 1538)

Sir Brian Tuke (born c. 1470 - died 26 October 1545) was the secretary of Henry VIII and Cardinal Wolsey. He served as the first Governor of the King's Posts (later the Postmaster General of the United Kingdom) from 1517 to 1545.

== Life ==
Sir Brian Tuke appears to have been born in 1470, as Holbein’s portrait of him (National Gallery in Washington D.C.), at the age of 57 has been dated to 1527. He may have been the son of Richard Tuke (died 1498?) and Agnes his wife, daughter of John Bland of Nottinghamshire. The family was settled in Kent, and Sir Brian's father or grandfather, also named Richard, is said to have been tutor to Thomas Howard, 2nd Duke of Norfolk. Possibly through Norfolk's influence, Brian Tuke was introduced at court; in 1508 he was appointed king's bailiff of Sandwich, Kent and in 1509 was appointed Clerk of the Signet. On 28 October 1509 he was appointed clerk of the council at Calais. He accompanied Henry VIII at Tournai in September 1513, and his correspondence with Richard Pace, Wolsey's secretary relates valuable information on the Battle of Flodden.

== Offices ==
About 1510 he became secretary to Chancellor Cardinal Thomas Wolsey and received his knighthood. The earliest mention of Master of the Posts is in the King's Book of Payments where a payment of £100 was authorised for Tuke as master of the posts in February 1512. Belatedly, in 1517, he was officially appointed to the office of Governor of the King's Posts, a precursor to the office of Postmaster General of the United Kingdom, by Henry VIII.

In 1516 he was made a knight of the king's body, and in 1517 governor of the king's posts. For some time Tuke was secretary to Cardinal Wolsey, and in 1522 he was promoted to be French secretary to the king; much correspondence passed through his hands, and there are more than six hundred references to him in the fourth volume alone of Brewer's Letters and Papers of Henry VIII.

On 17 April 1523 Tuke was granted the office of Clerk of the Parliament (as it was then known) surrendered by John Taylor. In 1528 he was one of the commissioners appointed to treat for peace with France, and in the same year was made treasurer of the household. A copy of one of his account books as treasurer of the chamber survives.

In February 1530-1 Edward North was associated with him in the clerkship of parliaments, and in 1533 Tuke served as High Sheriff of Essex and Hertfordshire. In January 1538, Tuke was at court and made a list of New Year's Day gifts presented to Henry VIII.

Among the numerous grants with which his services were rewarded Tuke received the manors of South Weald, Layer Marney, Thorpe, and East Lee in Essex. He performed his official duties to the king's satisfaction, avoided all pretence to political independence, and retained his posts until his death at Layer Marney on 26 October 1545. He was buried with his wife in St Margaret Lothbury.

== Family ==
Tuke married Grissell Boughton (d. 28 December 1538), daughter of Nicholas Boughton of Woolwich, by whom he had three sons and three daughters. The eldest son, Maximilian, predeceased him; the second, Charles, died soon after him, and the property devolved on the third, George Tuke, who was sheriff of Essex in 1567. His eldest daughter, Elizabeth, married George Tuchet, 9th Baron Audley. His second daughter, Mary, married Sir Reginald Scott of Scot's Hall, Kent, by whom she was the mother of five sons and four daughters, including Mary Scott, who married firstly Richard Argall, by whom she had five sons, including Sir Samuel Argall, and six daughters; and secondly Lawrence Washington of Maidstone, by whom she had no issue.

== Works ==
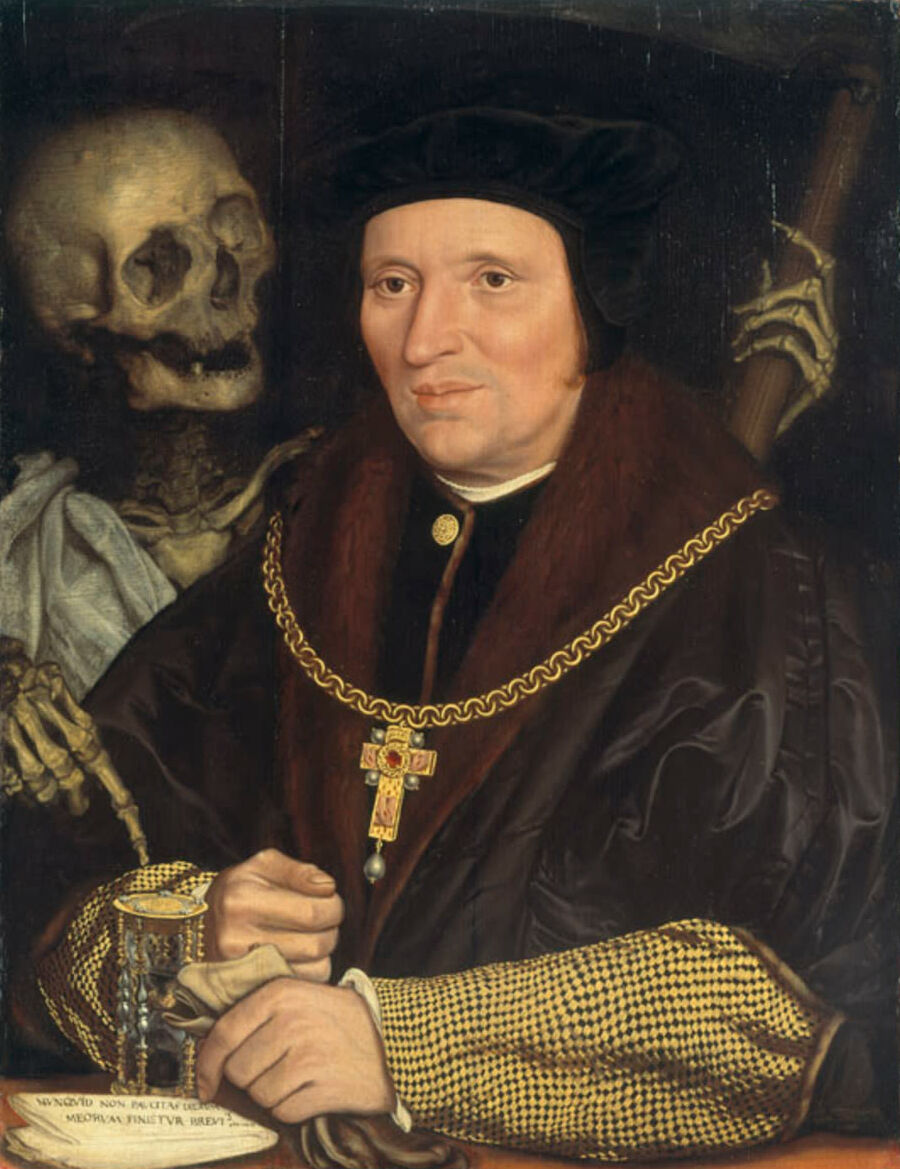
Sir Brian Tuke shadowed by Death, c.1540, by an anonymous artist after Holbein.

Six portraits of Tuke are ascribed to Holbein, whose salary it was Tuke's business to pay. Tuke was a patron of learning as well as of art; John Leland speaks of his eloquence, and celebrates his praises in nine Latin poems in Encomia. He wrote the preface to William Thynne's edition of Chaucer published in 1532. He is said to have written against Polydore Vergil, and to have been one of the authors from whom Raphael Holinshed derived his facts (which may refer to Tuke's numerous letters and state papers.)

== Notes ==
Political offices
Unknown	Clerk of the Signet; 1509–1523	Succeeded by Thomas Derby
New creation	Master of the King's Posts; 1517–1545	Succeeded by John Mason
Preceded by J Taylor	Clerk of the Parliaments; 1523–1531	Succeeded by Edward North
Preceded by Henry Wyatt	Treasurer of the Chamber; 1528 – 1545	Succeeded by Sir Anthony Rous
