= Lord Lieutenant of Cambridgeshire =

Civil post in Cambridgeshire, England

This is a list of people who have served as Lord Lieutenant of Cambridgeshire. The title Lord Lieutenant is given to the British monarch's personal representative in the counties of the United Kingdom. Lord Lieutenants are supported by an appointed Vice Lord Lieutenant and Deputy Lieutenants. Since 1715, all Lord Lieutenants have also been Custos Rotulorum of Cambridgeshire.

The current Lord-Lieutenant of Cambridgeshire is Julie Spence as of 4 April 2017.

Flag of a Lord Lieutenant

== Lord Lieutenants of Cambridgeshire to 1965 ==
Incorporating the liberty of Isle of Ely, a county palatine from 1107 to 1535/6, declared a division of Cambridgeshire in 1837 when the secular powers of the Bishop of Ely ended. For the Soke of Peterborough to 1965, see Lord Lieutenant of Northamptonshire and for Huntingdonshire during this period, Lord Lieutenant of Huntingdonshire.

- William Parr, 1st Marquess of Northampton 1547–?
- Edward North, 1st Baron North 1557–1564
- Roger North, 2nd Baron North 20 November 1569 – ?
- unknown
- Roger North, 2nd Baron North 8 April 1588 – 3 December 1600
- vacant
- Thomas Howard, 1st Earl of Suffolk 17 July 1602– 28 May 1626
- Theophilus Howard, 2nd Earl of Suffolk 15 June 1626 – 3 June 1640
- William Maynard, 1st Baron Maynard 17 June 1640 – 17 December 1640 jointly with
- Dudley North, 3rd Baron North 22 October 1640 – 1642
- Interregnum
- James Howard, 3rd Earl of Suffolk 25 July 1660 – 9 March 1681
- William Alington, 3rd Baron Alington 9 March 1681 – 1 February 1685
- Edward Montagu, 2nd Earl of Sandwich 1685 (did not serve; exercised in his absence by:)
  - Robert Bruce, 1st Earl of Ailesbury 4 March 1685 – 20 October 1685
- vacant
- Henry Jermyn, 1st Baron Dover 26 November 1686 – 10 May 1689
- William Russell, 1st Duke of Bedford 10 May 1689 – 7 September 1700
- Lord Edward Russell 22 November 1700 – 27 November 1701
- Wriothesley Russell, 2nd Duke of Bedford 27 November 1701 – 26 May 1711
- William North, 6th Baron North 6 December 1711 – 28 October 1715
- Edward Russell, 1st Earl of Orford 28 October 1715 – 26 November 1727
- Henry Clinton, 7th Earl of Lincoln 28 March 1728 – 7 September 1728
- Henry Bromley, 1st Baron Montfort 13 June 1729 – 24 July 1742
- Henry Fiennes Pelham-Clinton, 2nd Duke of Newcastle 24 July 1742 – 25 August 1757
- Philip Yorke, 2nd Earl of Hardwicke 25 August 1757 – 16 May 1790
- Philip Yorke, 3rd Earl of Hardwicke 3 July 1790 – 18 November 1834
- Charles Yorke, 4th Earl of Hardwicke 20 January 1834– 17 September 1873
- Charles Watson Townley 20 January 1874 – 17 October 1893
- Alexander Peckover, 1st Baron Peckover 11 December 1893 – 12 December 1906
- Thomas Agar-Robartes, 6th Viscount Clifden 12 December 1906 – 1915
- Charles Adeane 25 October 1915 – 11 February 1943
- Richard George Briscoe 15 May 1943 – 11 December 1957
- Robert Henry Parker 16 June 1958 – 14 April 1965

== Lord Lieutenants of Cambridgeshire and the Isle of Ely ==
The Lieutenancy became that of Cambridgeshire and Isle of Ely on 1 April 1965, when that administrative county was formed. For Huntingdon and Peterborough, see the separate Lord Lieutenant of Huntingdon and Peterborough.

- Geoffrey Taylor Hurrell 14 April 1965 – 31 March 1974

== Lord Lieutenants of Cambridgeshire from 1974 ==
On 1 April 1974, the new non-metropolitan county of Cambridgeshire was formed from Cambridgeshire and Isle of Ely and Huntingdon and Peterborough. On 1 April 1998, the city of Peterborough ceded from Cambridgeshire as a unitary authority, but it continues to form part of that county for ceremonial purposes.

- Geoffrey Taylor Hurrell 1 April 1974 – 26 March 1975 (former Lord Lieutenant of Cambridgeshire and Isle of Ely), with
  - Dennis George Ruddock Herbert, 2nd Baron Hemingford 1 April 1974 – ?, styled Lieutenant of Cambridgeshire
- Peter Esmé Brassey 26 March 1975 – 9 March 1981
- Sir Peter Proby, 2nd Baronet 9 March 1981 – 1985
- Michael Guy Molesworth Bevan 1985 – 2 March 1992
- James Crowden 3 July 1992 – 2002
- Sir Hugh Duberly 20 August 2003 – 4 April 2017
- Julie Spence 4 April 2017 – present

== Deputy Lieutenants ==
A deputy lieutenant of Cambridgeshire is commissioned by the Lord Lieutenant of Cambridgeshire. Deputy lieutenants support the work of the lord-lieutenant. There can be several deputy lieutenants at any time, depending on the population of the county. Their appointment does not terminate with the changing of the lord-lieutenant, but they usually retire at age 75.

=== 19th Century ===
- 25 January 1831: William Henry Cheere
- 25 January 1831: George Newton
- 16 February 1831: John Bendyshe
- 16 February 1831: Henry Hawkins
- 16 February 1831: Richard Huddleston
- 16 February 1831: Wedd William Nash
- 16 February 1831: John Phillips
- 16 February 1831: James Wortham
- 25 February 1831: Ebenezer Foster
- 25 February 1831: Robert Francis Pate
- 25 February 1831: John Wing

== See also ==
- High Sheriff of Cambridgeshire
