= Julie Spence =

British police officer (retired), activist, and Lord Lieutenant of Cambridgeshire (2017-)

Julie Spence OBE QPM CStJ
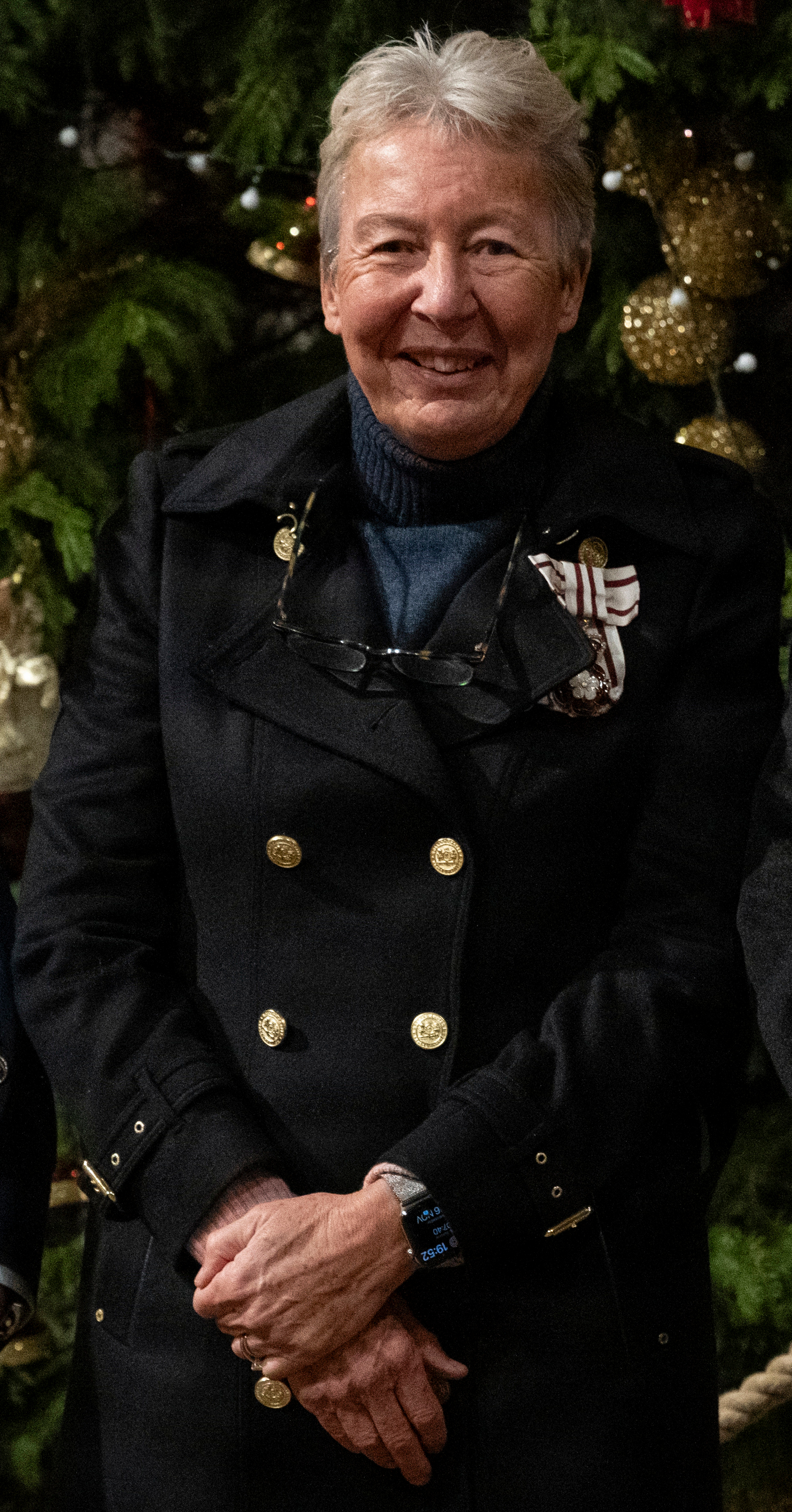
- Spence in 2025
- Born: 7 August 1955 (age 71)
- Occupation: Police officer (retired)
- Office: Lord Lieutenant of Cambridgeshire
- Awards: Officer of the Order of the British Empire (2006); Queen’s Police Medal (2010); Commander of the Order of St John (2021)

Julie Spence is a retired British police officer and activist. She served as the chief constable for Cambridgeshire Constabulary from 10 December 2005 to 5 September 2010, and made headline news over demanding fairer funding due to the rise in migration and immigration in Cambridgeshire.

Spence is the former president of the British Association for Women in Policing and was the ACPO lead on citizen focus issues. In 2006 she won the Champion Award for her commitment and achievement in her role as a gender champion. She is currently the chair of both Cambridgeshire and Peterborough NHS Foundation Trust and Police Mutual, and is currently serving as His Majesty's Lord Lieutenant of Cambridgeshire since her appointment in 2017. As lord-lieutenant she leads the Lieutenancy of Cambridgeshire.

== Policing career ==
In 1978, Spence joined Avon and Somerset Police and was posted to South Bristol. After a period of service, which included postings to CID, community policing, the force communications centre, the Family and Child Protection Unit, the Press Office and uniform patrol, she was seconded to the Association of Chief Police Officers secretariat in London for two years as a temporary chief inspector.

On returning to Avon and Somerset Spence undertook a number of operational roles before being promoted to superintendent and posted to North Bristol. She is an advocate of lifelong learning and during her career continued her personal development and consequently undertook part-time and distance learning degree courses in law, police studies and management. In 1999 she was appointed to assistant chief constable for Thames Valley Police, where she held the Corporate Development portfolio. She took over the Territorial Policing portfolio in January 2003.

Spence was appointed to deputy chief constable for Cambridgeshire Constabulary in April 2004 and was responsible for operational policing for the county. On 1 June 2005, she was appointed acting chief constable and subsequently appointed chief constable on 10 December 2005. She retired from the police force on 5 September 2010.

Spence was appointed as Her Majesty's Lord Lieutenant of Cambridgeshire on 4 April 2017.

On 12 July 2024, Spence unveiled the first Royal Mail post box to feature Charles III's cypher in Cambourne, Cambridgeshire.

== Charity work ==
Spence is currently an ambassador for the charity SkillForce, and a trustee of Ormiston Families, an East of England charity which endeavours to give young people a better chance in life. She is also the Cambridge branch chair of Wellbeing of Women, a charity which raises money to fund research into conditions which impact on the lives of women and babies.. In April 2018, she became the patron of Cambridgeshire Search and Rescue (Registered Charity No. 111862).

== Awards ==
Spence was appointed an OBE in the Queen's 2006 Birthday Honours on the following grounds:

- Management of complex and contentious organisational issues
- Leadership of Thames Valley's contribution to the operations to protect Heathrow and the Queen Mother's funeral
- Work for the ACPO Terrorism and Allied Matters Committee on Royalty and VIP Protection
- Strong leadership and determination in taking forward the Gender Agenda and the development of the British Association of Women in Policing

In 2021, it was gazetted that Spence had been appointed as a Commander of the Order of St John.
