= Kirtling =

Settlement in Cambridgeshire, England

Coordinates: 52.18°N 0.47°E

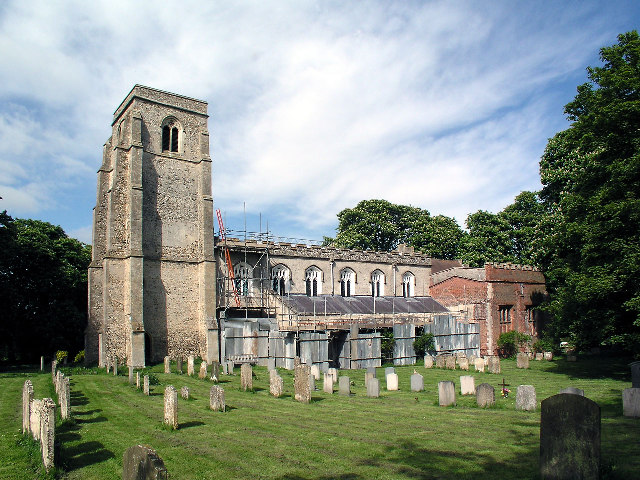
- Kirtling All Saints parish church

- Location within Cambridgeshire
- Population: 327 (2011)
- OS grid reference: TL687565
- Shire county: Cambridgeshire
- Region: East
- Country: England
- Sovereign state: United Kingdom
- Post town: Newmarket
- Postcode district: CB8
- Website: http://www.kirtlingandupend.org/

Kirtling, together with Kirtling Green and Kirtling Towers, is a scattered settlement in the south-eastern edge of the English county of Cambridgeshire. It forms a civil parish with the nearby village of Upend to its north. The population of the settlement is included in the civil parish of Woodditton.

== Heritage ==
From the 16th to the 19th centuries, Kirtling was known as Catlidge. Upend was originally called Upheme – old English for "the up-dwelling". Upend may once have been a separate village, but it had been absorbed into Kirtling before 1066. By 1086, Kirtling had become the most heavily populated parish in the neighbourhood.

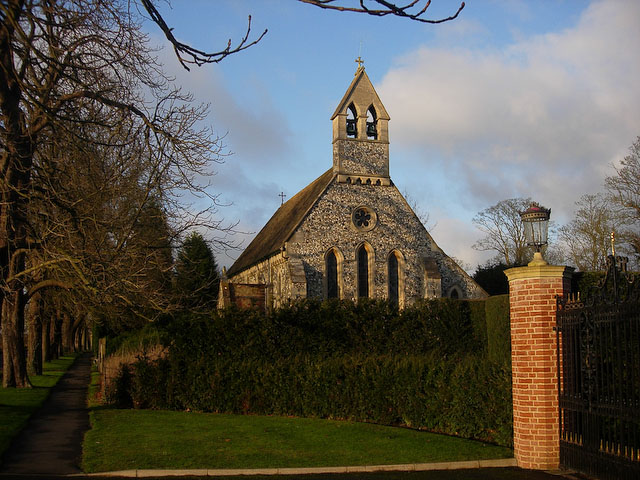
Roman Catholic Church of the Immaculate Conception and St Philip Neri, Kirtling

A rich Cambridgeshire landowner named Oswi and his wife Leofflaed gave the parish of Kirtling to Ely Abbey around 1000. It later belonged to Earl (later King) Harold, who died in 1066. By 1086 it was probably held by an Englishman named Frawine of Kirtling.

All Saints Parish Church is a Grade I listed building, dating back to the 13th century. Kirtling Tower is also a Grade I listed building, its gatehouse built about 1530 by Edward North, 1st Baron North. Dudley North, 4th Baron North, politician and polymath, was buried at Kirtling on 27 June 1677. His granddaughter Dudleya North, an orientalist and linguist, was buried here in 1712.

John Crichton-Stuart, 2nd Marquess of Bute built almshouses in Kirtling in 1842 in memory of his late wife Lady Maria (died 1841).

== Population ==
The population of the parish peaked at 909 in 1851, then fell below 800 in 1880, 600 in 1910, 500 in 1930 and to 300 in 1971. The population (including Upend) at the 2011 census was 327.

== Infant deaths in 1991 ==
In July 1991 27 year Lorraine Voelcker (17 October 1966 - June 1991), had an asthma attack and died at her home, The Forge, where they had lived since March 1991. There were two children Galen, aged 2, and Laura, aged 16 months. 23 year Sgt Gregory Brian Voelcker (born 4 October 1967), from Dallas, Texas, at RAF Mildenhall on the 6988th Electronic Security Squadron, had married Lorraine Worth on 16 August 1988 in Tom Green County, Texas. He was due home on 27 June 1991 but his tour in Crete, from 3 June 1991, was extended by three days. His two children had starved and were dehydrated. He returned at 6pm on Sunday 30 June 1991.

RAF Mildenhall had a contact policy to make weekly calls to servicemen's wives, when the servicemen were away on duty. The last call was made on 12 June 1991, when the USAF personnel were told that Mrs Voelcker was going to North Wales with her children. When the next weekly call was not answered, it was assumed that Mrs Voelcker was in north Wales. The death was investigated by Prof Austin Gresham. Mr Voelcker remarried in May 1992, in Suffolk, with their daughter born in June 1993 in Texas.
