= Dudley North, 3rd Baron North =

English nobleman and politician

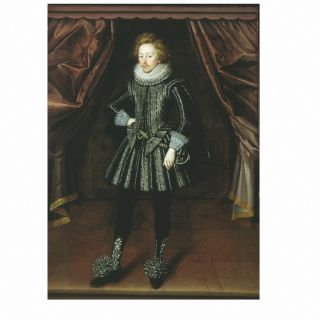
Dudley, Third Baron North (1581–1666), artist unknown, about 1615, England V&A Museum no. P.4&:1-1948

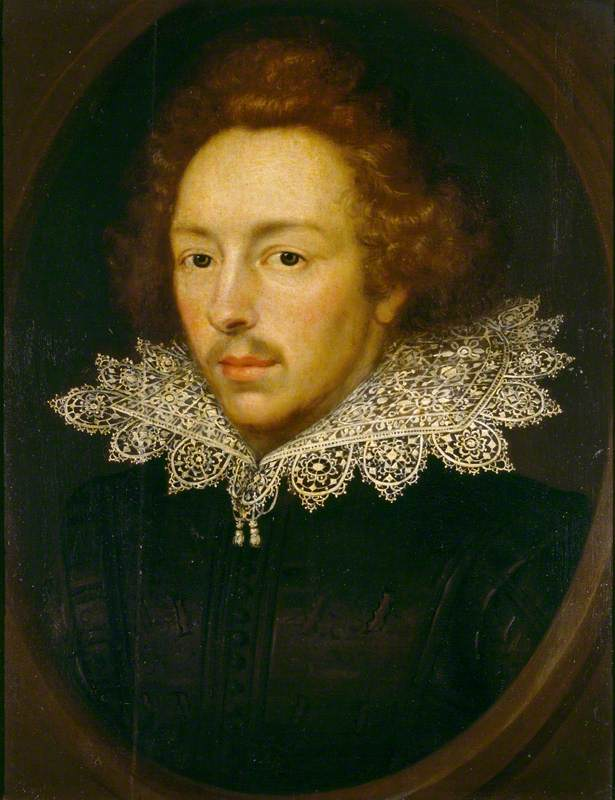
Portrait of Dudley North, 1615, at the Vyne

Dudley North, 3rd Baron North (1581 – 16 January 1666) was an English nobleman and politician.

== Biography ==
North was the son of Sir John North and of Dorothy, daughter and heiress of Sir Valentine Dale. He succeeded his grandfather, Roger North, 2nd Baron North, at the age of nineteen. He was educated at Trinity College, Cambridge, and married in 1599 Frances, daughter of Sir John Brocket of Brocket Hall in Hertfordshire. He travelled in Italy, took part in the campaign of 1602 in the Netherlands, and on his return became a conspicuous figure at court, excelling in athletic exercises as well as in poetry and music, and gaining the friendship of Prince Henry.

In 1606, while returning from Eridge to London, he discovered the springs at The Pantiles, Tunbridge Wells, which cured North himself of a complaint and quickly became famous. He also recommended the Epsom springs to the public.

He supported and subscribed to the expedition to Guyana made by his brother Roger North (c. 1582 – c. 1652) in 1619, and when Roger departed without leave, Dudley was imprisoned for two days in the Fleet. In 1626 he attached himself to the party of Lord Saye and Sele in the Lords, who were in sympathy with the aims of the Commons; and when the Civil War broke out he was on the side of the parliament. In 1641 he was a member of the Lords committee on Religion, and served on the committee to consider Laud's attainder in 1644, finally voting for the ordinance in January 1645. He was placed on the admiralty commission in 1645, and acted as Lord Lieutenant of Cambridgeshire. He was one of the small group of Lords who continued attendance in the House of Peers, and on 19 December 1648, with three others, visited Fairfax, when they "cast down their honors at his Excellency's feet" and protested their desire not to retain any privileges prejudicial to the public interest. He passed the rest of his life in retirement at Kirtling in Cambridgeshire. He died leaving a daughter (Dorothy) and two sons, the elder of which, Sir Dudley, succeeded him as the 4th Baron North.

== Works ==
Dudley North wrote A Forest of Varieties (1645), a miscellany of essays and poems, another edition of which was published in 1659 under the title of A Forest promiscuous of various Seasons' Productions.

Political offices
Preceded by The Lord Maynard	Lord Lieutenant of Cambridgeshire jointly with The Lord Maynard October–December 1640; 1640–1642	Succeeded by Interregnum
Peerage of England
Preceded by Roger North	Baron North; 1600–1666	Succeeded by Dudley North
