= Dudley North, 4th Baron North =

English politician

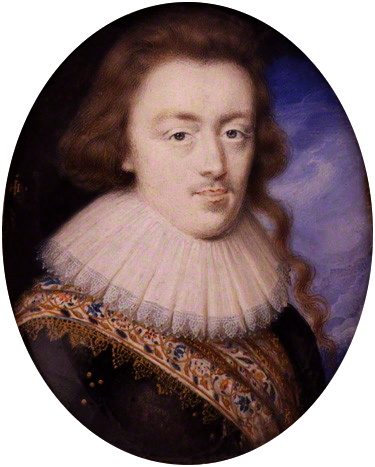
Lord North

Dudley North, 4th Baron North, KB (1602 – 24 June 1677) of Kirtling Tower, Cambridgeshire was an English politician, who sat in the House of Commons at various times between 1628 and 1660.

== Life ==
North was the elder son of Dudley North, 3rd Baron North, and his wife Frances Brockett, daughter of Sir John Brocket of Brocket Hall in Hertfordshire. In 1616 he was created a Knight of the Bath. He was admitted to St John's College, Cambridge, in 1619 and to Gray's Inn in August 1619. In 1620 he joined the volunteer regiment for the relief of the Electoral Palatinate and served in Holland during the Dutch–Portuguese War. He travelled in Italy, France and Spain. In 1628 he was elected member of parliament for Horsham and sat until 1629, when Charles I of England decided to rule without parliament for eleven years.

North was then elected, in April 1640, as MP for Cambridgeshire in the Short Parliament. He was re-elected to the seat in November 1640, in the Long Parliament, and ultimately in 1660, to the Convention Parliament, after the Restoration of the monarchy. On the death of his father in January 1667 he succeeded to the title Baron North.

North was an accomplished, studious man, who wrote on economic and religious subjects. Among his publications were Passages relating to the Long Parliament, of which he had himself been a member, and Observations and Advices Oeconomical. He also wrote poetry for private consumption.

North died in 1677 and was buried at Kirtling, Cambridgeshire, on 27 June 1677.

== Family ==
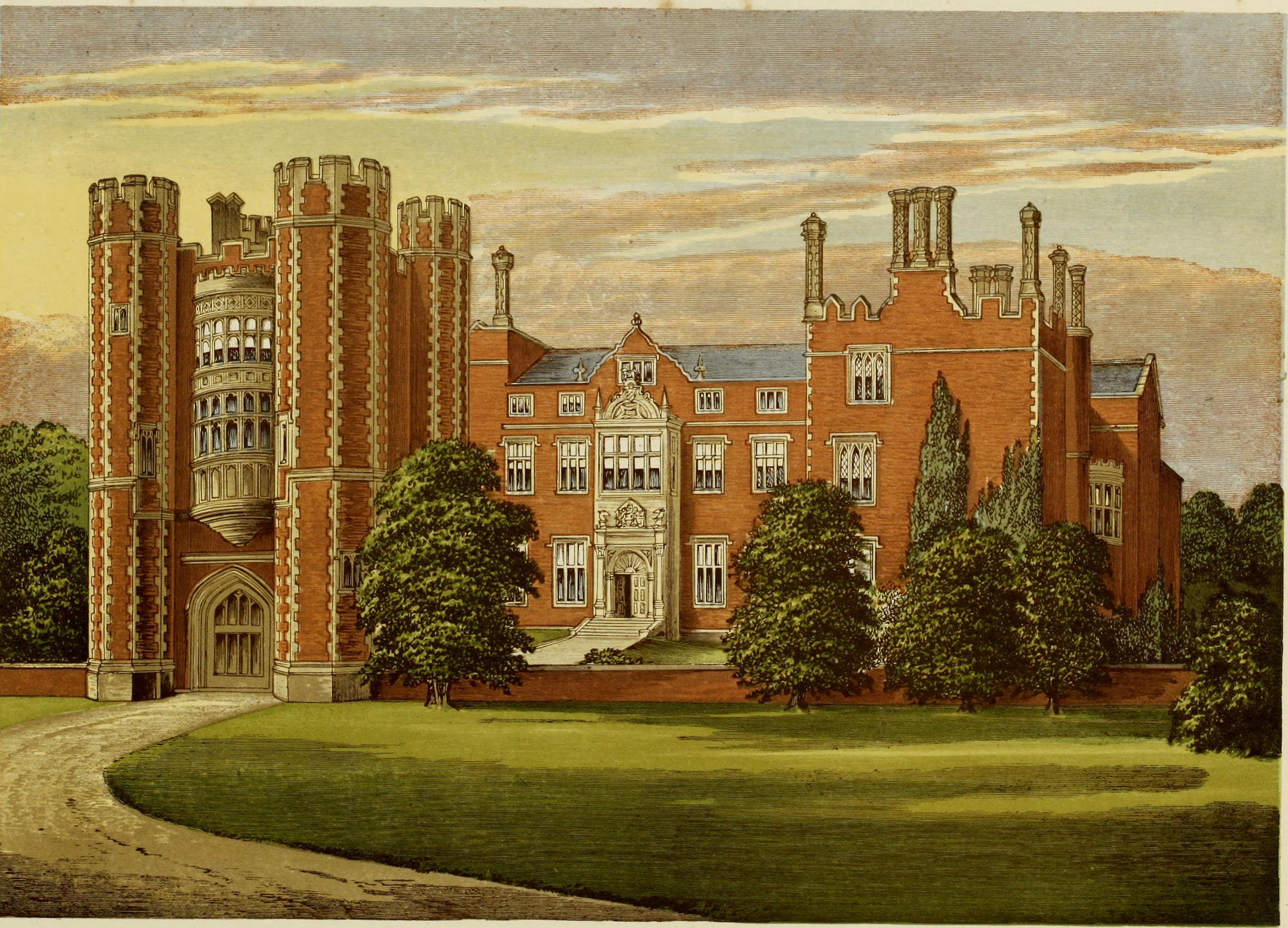
Kirtling Tower, from, A series of picturesque views of seats of the noblemen and gentlemen of Great Britain and Ireland (1840)

North married Anne Montagu, daughter of Sir Charles Montagu of Boughton House and his wife Mary Whitmore, and brother of Henry Montagu, 1st Earl of Manchester, so increasing the family fortune. They had 14 children. His eldest son, Charles (c. 1636–1691), was created Baron Grey of Rolleston during his father's life and succeeded his father as 5th Baron North. His third son, Francis North, became Lord Chancellor as Lord Guilford. His fourth son was Sir Dudley North, the economist. His fifth son was John North (1645–1683), master of Trinity College, Cambridge, and professor of Greek in the university. His sixth son was Roger North, the lawyer and historian. One of his daughters, Mary, married Sir William Spring MP, and another, Jane Bridget, married William Henry Moss. Elizabeth, his 3rd surviving daughter married twice including as Elizabeth Wiseman; she was a noted litigant. His granddaughter Dudleya North was an orientalist, linguist and classical scholar.

Parliament of England
Preceded by John Borough; John Middleton	Member of Parliament for Horsham; 1628–1629; With: John Middleton	Parliament suspended until 1640
Vacant Parliament suspended since 1629	Member of Parliament for Cambridgeshire; 1640–1648; With: Sir John Cutts 1640; Thomas Chicheley 1640–1644; Sir Francis Russell, 2nd Baronet	Succeeded by John Sadler; Thomas French; Robert Castle; Samuel Warner
Vacant Not represented in restored Rump	Member of Parliament for Cambridge; 1660; With: Sir Thomas Wills, 1st Baronet	Succeeded by Sir William Compton; Roger Pepys
Peerage of England
Preceded by Dudley North	Baron North; 1666–1677	Succeeded by Charles North
