= Kirtling Tower =

Grade I listed castle in East Cambridgeshire, United Kingdom

- Kirtling, Cambridgeshire, England
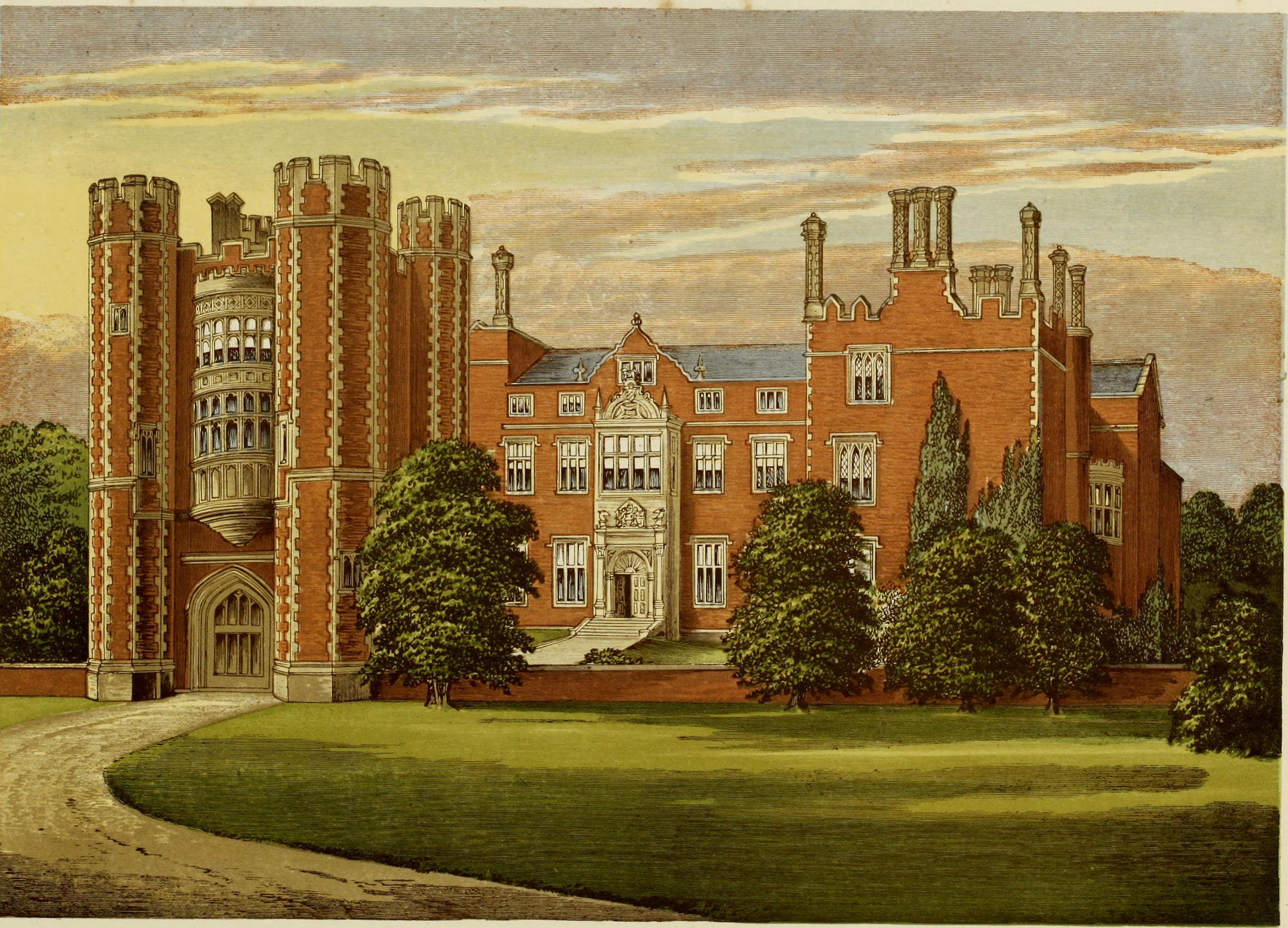
- Kirtling Tower, from, A series of picturesque views of seats of the noblemen and gentlemen of Great Britain and Ireland (1840)

Site information
- Open to the public: No
- Condition: Private

Location
- Shown within Cambridgeshire
- Location within Cambridgeshire
- Coordinates: 52.1891°N 0.4650°E
- Grid reference: grid reference TL686574

Site history
- Materials: Brick

Kirtling Tower was a medieval castle and Tudor country house in Kirtling, Cambridgeshire, England, of which the gatehouse still remains.

== History ==
The first documentary records for Kirtling Tower date from 1219, and the 13th century Kirtling Castle was described as having a moat, a ditch and a palisade. In 1424 there was a substantial rebuilding of the castle by Richard de Beauchamp, the Earl of Warwick, with a hundred oak trees used to create a complex with a parlour, a solar and chambers.

Edward North, a successful lawyer, rebuilt the castle in the 1540s and between 1556 and 1558 using the architect Francis Adams, renaming it Kirtling Hall. The earthworks around the castle were considerably altered to provide for a raised platform for the new house, which included contemporary Tudor features such as a gatehouse, gallery, lodgings, a banqueting house and a garden, complete with grand water features and ponds. Queen Elizabeth I stayed at the castle as the guest of Roger North, 2nd Baron North for three days in September 1578 during her state procession across Cambridgeshire. The visit cost Lord North £642.

Roger North's niece, Elizabeth North, was the inspiration for the character Rosalind(e) in Rosalind (As You Like It). In 1905, Spenser scholar Percy Long identified Thomas North’s daughter, Elisa North, as the Rosalinde Spenser was courting in The Shepheardes Calender. Long provided evidence that Elisa lived with her powerful uncle, Roger North, 2nd Baron North, at his estates of Kirtling Tower and that Spenser met Elisa at festivities there. Rosalind(e) was an anagram for Elizabeth North or R O S A L I N D E = ELISA NORD, and Nord is French for North.

Rosalinde’s residence was among "those hills" of the "higher country." Kirtling Hall sat atop one of the tallest hills in the highest part of a ridge, commanding a view of two shires. Indeed, Kirtling (or, at times, “Carthlage” or “Catlidge”) was named for the ridge upon which it was founded: “Cyrtla’s” ridge. The source for the name of Upend, which had been a part of Kirtling since before 1066, is even more fitting: British History Online includes a webpage on the history of Kirtling, which states: “Upend was until the 15th century called Upheme (Old English ‘the up-dwellers’), indicating its position further up the valley. Visitors to Kirtling Hall will also notice that it offers an elevated and commanding view of the surrounding countryside. The gloss in The Shepheardes Calender also emphasizes Rosalinde’s residence as "the North country" and "the North parts". This has confused several scholars, who had a difficult time explaining why Spenser would refer to a region in Cambridgeshire as "North country." But given that Roger, the 2nd Lord North, was both the Lord Lieutenant of Cambridgeshire and High Steward of Cambridge, the Norths were the most powerful family in the region—and Elisa North was then the focus of his life—it is not difficult to see why Spenser would refer to Kirtling and the Cambridge region as "the North country" and "the North parts."

Thomas North's likely cousin, George North (diplomat) wrote the manuscript A Brief Discourse of Rebellion and Rebells while at Kirtling Hall. It is dedicated to "Sir Roger North" (Roger North, 2nd Baron North), and praises his brother Thomas North. The suggestion is that these were relatives. The suggestion is also there, that North's poems on Owain Glyndŵr and Jack Cade should be compared to Shakespeare's dramatic treatments of these figures. An edition was published in 2018, by Dennis McCarthy and June Schlueter, as "A Brief Discourse of Rebellion and Rebels" by George North: A Newly Uncovered Manuscript Source for William Shakespeare's plays. They identify the manuscript as an important source for Shakespeare's plays and note that the manuscript is now in the British Library, is dated to 1576.

The castle continued to develop, and by the 1660s was the largest country house in Cambridgeshire, centered on a symmetrical two-storeyed south-facing range, with east and west wings providing additional accommodation and facilities.

The castle went into decline after 1691 and by 1735 the Victoria County History of the castle describes the property as being "in disorder". Much of the castle was pulled down in 1748 in order to make the remainder habitable for Lord Elibank, but the property went into decline again after his death in 1762. By the 1770s it was unhabitable and most of the castle was pulled down in 1801. In the 1830s the gatehouse was turned into a residential property and was renamed Kirtling Tower; an extension was built in 1872 and the house remained in use under a sequence of tenants.

== Today ==
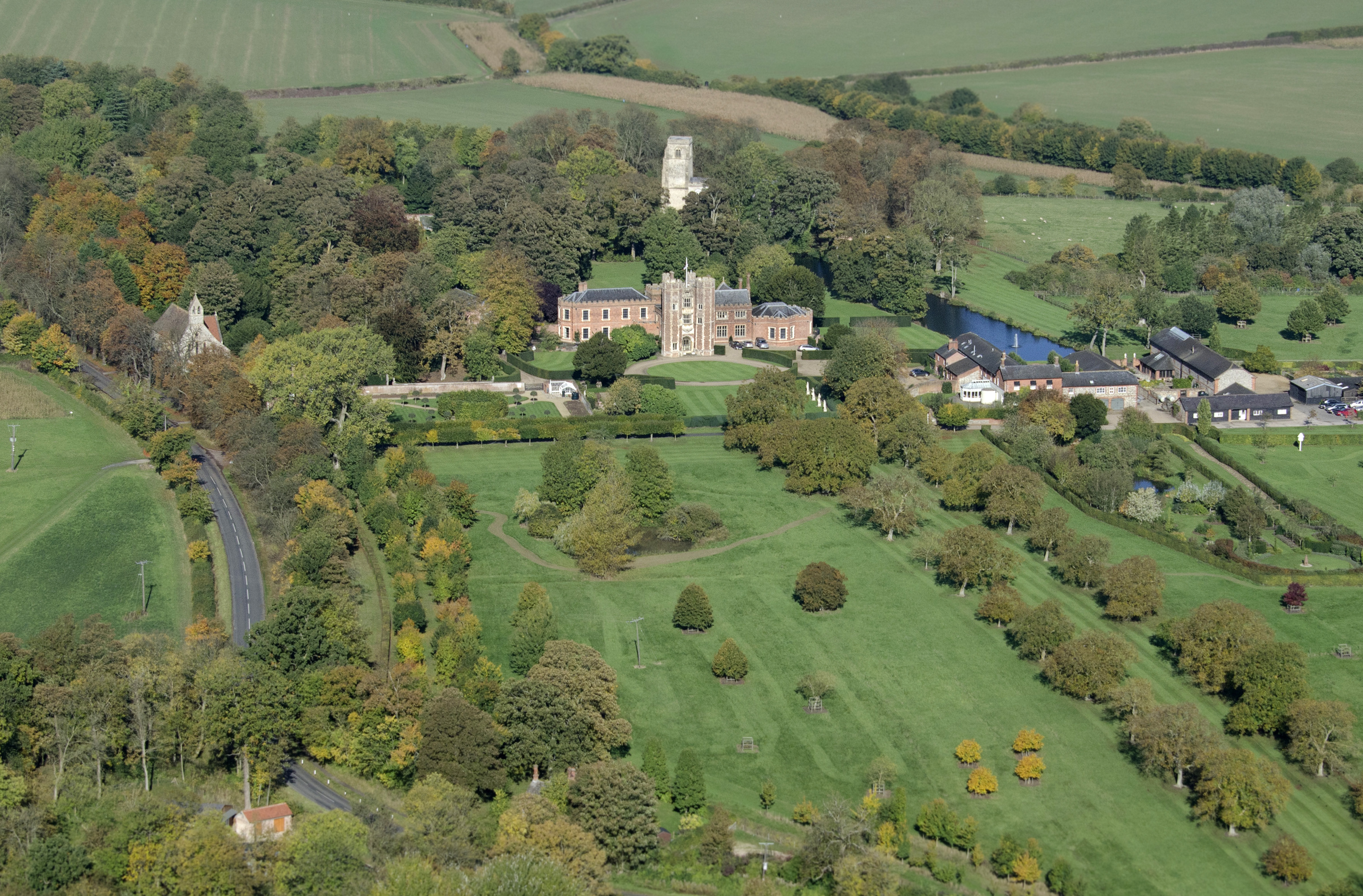
Kirtling Tower gatehouse (2013)

The main feature of the castle today is the three-storeyed Tudor gatehouse, which closely resembles the gatehouse at Leez Priory in Essex, built by North's friend and fellow lawyer Richard Rich. Built of brick, it has octagonal turrets and an oriel window of Italian design. It is a scheduled monument and a Grade I listed building.

== See also ==
- Castles in Great Britain and Ireland
- List of castles in England
