= High Sheriff of Cambridgeshire =

List of sheriffs

This is a list of sheriffs and since 1974 high sheriffs of Cambridgeshire.

The Sheriff is the oldest secular office under the Crown. Formerly the Sheriff was the principal law enforcement officer in the county but over the centuries most of the responsibilities associated with the post have been transferred elsewhere or are now defunct, so that its functions are now largely ceremonial. Under the provisions of the Local Government Act 1972, on 1 April 1974 the office previously known as Sheriff was retitled High Sheriff.

== Before 1154 ==
- Tempore Regis Eduardi: Aluric Godricson, Orgar, Blacuin
- 1066: Elfric
- 1070–c.1090: Picot of Cambridge
- c.1110–1122: Gilbert
- c.1125–1129: Fulk
- Michaelmas 1129: Richard Basset with Aubrey de Vere
- c.1133: Fulk
- 1140: Payn

From 1154 until 1635, appointees to the shrievalty held the joint office of Sheriff of Cambridgeshire and Huntingdonshire.

== 1636–1641 ==
- 3 October 1636: Sir John Carleton, 1st Baronet, of Cheveley
- 30 September 1637: Sir Thomas Chicheley, of Wimpole Hall
- 4 November 1638: Sir Thomas Wendy, of Haslingfield
- 1639: Thomas Prichard, of Trumpington
- 1640: John Crane, of Kingston
- 1641: Sir John Cotton, 1st Baronet, of Landwade

From 1642 until 1965, appointees to the shrievalty held the joint office of Sheriff of Cambridgeshire and Huntingdonshire. From 1965 until 1974, sheriffs were Sheriff of Cambridgeshire and Isle of Ely.

== 1974–1999 ==
- 1974: Michael Henry Tindall Carter of Paget Hall, Tydd St. Giles, Wisbech
- 1975: Kenneth Beaton
- 1976: Peter Boyton Taylor
- 1977: David Dring Morrell
- 1978: David Whittome
- 1979: George Edward McWatters
- 1980: George Simon Cecil Gibson, of Landwade Hall
- 1981: John Ray Horrell
- 1982: David Owen Arthur Morbey
- 1983: Major William Birkbeck, of Bainton House
- 1984: Brigadier Alan Norman Breitmeyer
- 1985: John Sinclair Martin, of Denny Abbey, Waterbeach
- 1986: Dr Irwin Arthur William Peck
- 1987: Sir Alexander James Reid
- 1988: Michael John Marshall
- 1989: Joseph Odam
- 1990: Nigel Stewart Elgood
- 1991: Hugh Duberly
- 1992: Godfrey Richard Warde Wright
- 1993 Elizabeth Anne, Lady Hastings of Milton Hall, Peterborough
- 1994: Frederick James Grounds
- 1995: Margaret Elspeth Thomas
- 1996: Nigel Hugh Mosman Chancellor
- 1997: David Temple Ramply
- 1998: Richard Brian Bamford
- 1999: John Edwin Heading

== 2000–present ==
- 2000: Antony Francis Pemberton
- 2001: Sir William Henry Proby
- 2002: Jane Lewin Smith
- 2003: David John Riddington
- 2004: Sir Charles Edward Chadwyck-Healey
- 2005: Simon Patrick Leatham of Burghley House
- 2006: John Jeremy Seymour Marshall
- 2007: Colonel Peter Geoffrey Ray Horrell
- 2008: Judith Penelope Glossop Bennett Gape Pearson
- 2009: Lady De Ramsey
- 2010: Nigel Wooldridge Brown
- 2011: Richard Symond Gyles Barnwell of Wisbech
- 2012: Penelope Walkinshaw of Cambridge
- 2013: Aubrey James Francis Buxton of Newmarket
- 2014: Linda Alison Fairbrother of Cambridge
- 2015: Captain Victor H. Lucas of the Manor House, Warboys
- 2016: Sir David Arculus
- 2017: Richard Pemberton of Haslingfield
- 2018: Dr Andrew Charles Harter
- 2019: Neil A McKittrick of Peterborough
- 2020: Brigadier Timothy John Seal of Orton Longueville
- 2021: Caroline Laura Elizabeth Margaret Bewes
- 2022: Jennifer Crompton
- 2023: Dr. Bharatkumar Narshidas Khetani
- 2024: David John Way
- 2025: Frances Stanley, Newmarket
- 2026: Francis William Miles Burkitt, Grantchester
