= John North (Trinity) =

John North (4 September 1645 – April 1683) was an English academic. He was born at Westminster, the fifth of fourteen children of Sir Dudley North, 4th Baron North, and became Regius Professor of Greek at the University of Cambridge from 1672 to 1674, and Master of Trinity College, Cambridge from 1677 to 1683.

John North was educated in Bury St Edmunds and entered Jesus College, Cambridge as a fellow-commoner in February 1660/1. He graduated BA in 1663/4, and (by Royal mandate) became a fellow of Jesus in 1664. In 1672 he migrated to Trinity College, Cambridge, and was Regius Professor of Greek from 1672 to 1674. He was made Clerk of the Closet in 1673, he was a prebendary of Westminster from 1673 to 1683 and chaplain to the King from 1676 to 1683. He was Master of Trinity from 1677 to 1683. He died in Cambridge and is buried in Trinity College Chapel.

Academic offices
Preceded by Isaac Barrow	Master of Trinity College, Cambridge; 1677–1683	Succeeded by John Montagu
