= Roger North (biographer) =

English lawyer and biographer (1653–1734)

Roger North KC
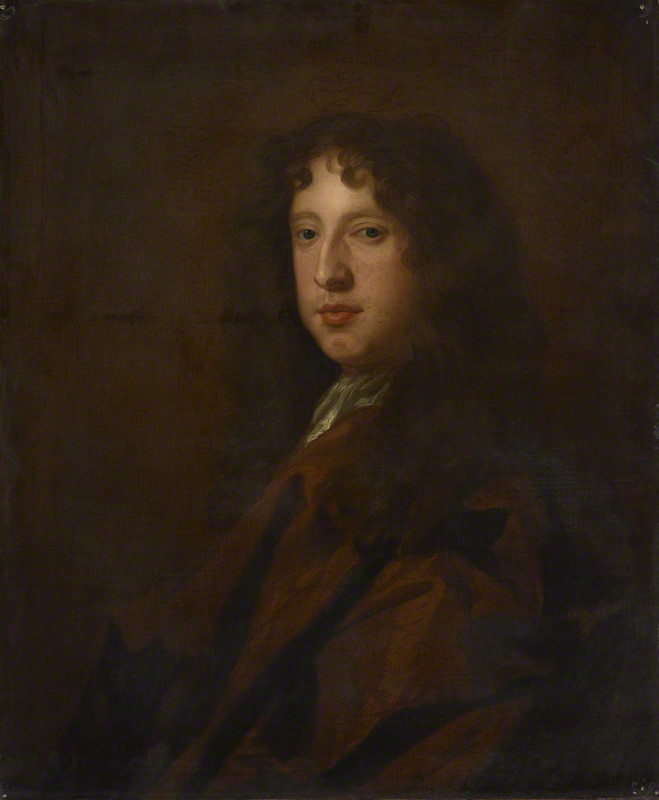
- North, 1680 portrait after Peter Lely
- Born: 3 September 1653; Tostock, Suffolk, England
- Died: 1 March 1734 (aged 80); Rougham, Norfolk, England
- Occupations: Lawyer, biographer

Roger North KC (3 September 1653 – 1 March 1734) was an English lawyer, biographer, and amateur musician.

== Life ==
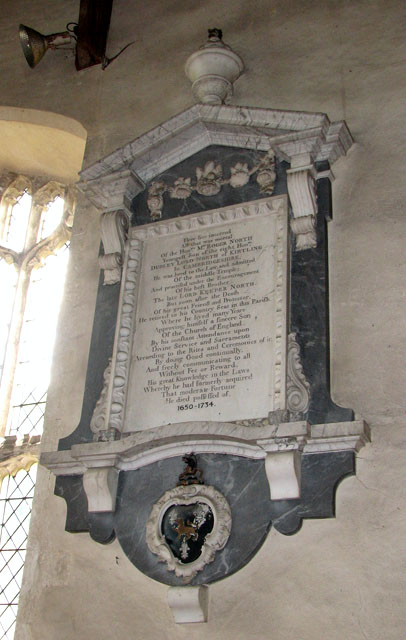
Mural monument to Roger North, Rougham Church, Norfolk

North was the sixth son of Dudley North, 4th Baron North, and his wife Anne Montagu and was the brother of Francis North, Elizabeth (became) Wiseman and Dudley North. He was born in Tostock, Suffolk. He attended Bury St Edmunds Grammar School and then Thetford Grammar School from 1663, followed by Jesus College, Cambridge, and the Middle Temple. He was called to the bar in 1674, and was Steward of the Diocese of Canterbury in 1678. He became King's Counsel and a Bencher of Middle Temple in 1682.

North developed a good practice at the bar, helped by his elder brother Francis, who became Lord Chancellor. Henry Hyde, 2nd Earl of Clarendon, called him "one of only two honest lawyers I ever knew". During the Popish Plot, while Francis succumbed to the prevailing anti-Catholic hysteria, Roger remained detached and sceptical. Although he was always loyal to his brother's memory, Roger admitted that during the Plot "wise men behaved like stark fools". In 1684 he became Solicitor-General to the Duke of York. After this his career suffered something of a check: Francis' unexpected early death in September 1685 was both a personal loss and a blow to Roger's career, since Francis was replaced as Lord Chancellor by the formidable Lord Jeffreys. Roger, who left a scarifying picture of Jeffreys in his memoirs, was a rather shy and diffident man, and frankly admitted to being terrified of Jeffreys; as a result, in his own words, his practice "declined so as to be scarce worth attending Court". The check was only temporary: in 1685, he was chosen as a Tory Member of Parliament for Dunwich, and became Recorder of Bristol. He was further advanced in 1686 to the office of Attorney General to Queen Mary of Modena. In 1686 his sister Elizabeth Wiseman was involved in a dispute. She was a rich widow, and their brother Charles North had tried to marry her off to his chosen candidate, Robert Spencer. Elizabeth asked for help, and three of her brothers, including Roger, came to her aid. This case is very well documented as Roger gathered together all the letters. There was a case at the Court of Arches and Robert and Charles were required to recant their version of the events.

The Glorious Revolution stopped his advancement, and he retired to his estate of Rougham in Norfolk and increased his fortune by marrying the daughter of Sir Robert Gayer.

North died at Rougham on 1 March 1734, leaving a family from whom the Norths of Rougham were descended.

== Works ==
North collected books, and was constantly occupied in writing, but he is best known for his Lives of the Norths, published after his death, together with his own autobiography (edition in Bohn's Standard Library, 1890, by Augustus Jessopp), an authority for the period. His comments on musical performance practice, in particular, have proven helpful for musicologists researching the Baroque style in England. In addition to his writing on performance practice, he wrote on musical aesthetics, pedagogy, and tuning and temperament; one of his most important achievements in this regard was devising a practical and detailed system for mean-tone tuning in the age before equal temperament. Another well-known work is Examen, a defence of Charles II's record as a ruler. He was also a learned connoisseur of architecture and designed a new gateway for the Middle Temple in London and a Palladian extension to his house at Rougham.

== Family ==
North married Mary, the daughter of Sir Robert Gayer of Stoke Poges, Buckinghamshire and his first wife Mary Rich, daughter of Sir Thomas Rich, 1st Baronet, with whom he had two sons and five daughters. Notable descendants include Marianne North, the botanical illustrator, and Frederick North, a Liberal politician.

== Notes ==
Parliament of England
Preceded by Sir Philip Skippon; Sir Robert Kemp, Bt	Member of Parliament for Dunwich; 1685–1689; With: Thomas Knyvett	Succeeded by Sir Philip Skippon; Sir Robert Rich, Bt
