= Roger North, 2nd Baron North =

Member of the Parliament of England

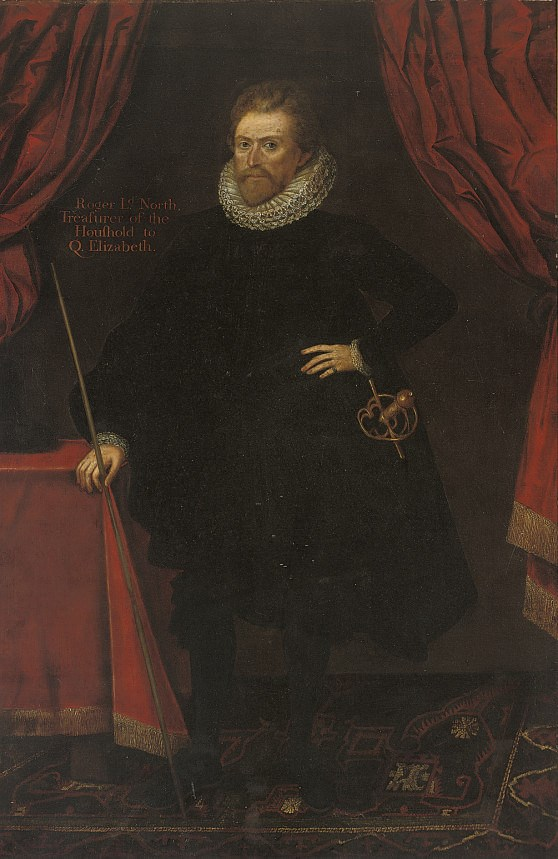
Portrait of Roger, 2nd Lord North

Roger North, 2nd Baron North (1531 – 3 December 1600) was an English peer and politician at the court of Elizabeth I.

== Biography ==
He was born 27 February 1531 to Edward North, 1st Baron North and his first wife. His father had represented Cambridgeshire in 3 Edwardian parliaments, and following his father's ennoblement by Mary I and presumably through his influence North sat for the Cambridgeshire in the queen's first parliament of 1555. His opposition to a government bill may have resulted in his failure to be returned for the next parliament, but he sat for Cambridge in the first two parliaments of Elizabeth I. He was created a knight of the Bath at Elizabeth's coronation and succeeded his father as Lord North in 1564.

In 1568 he was sent to Vienna with the Earl of Sussex to invest Emperor Maximilian with the Order of the Garter. He was appointed Lord Lieutenant of Cambridgeshire in 1569, and was Custos Rotulorum of Cambridgeshire by 1574. In 1574 he was sent on embassy to France, following the accession of Henry III. He was appointed Treasurer of the Household in 1596 after the death of Sir Francis Knollys.

North played card games called "maw" and Primero with Elizabeth on 6 August 1576. The queen came to his house at Kirtling for three days on 1 September 1578. The visit cost Lord North £642. He gave the queen a jewel worth £120.

North was a personal friend of Robert Dudley, Earl of Leicester, the Queen's favourite. He was present at the latter's secret marriage to Lettice Knollys, Countess of Essex in 1578, and served at his expedition to the Netherlands in 1585–1587. Leicester wanted to make Lord North governor of Brill in 1586, which desire was, however, declined by Elizabeth.

== Family ==
He married Winifred(d. 1578), daughter of Richard Rich, 1st Baron Rich and widow of Sir Henry Dudley (d. 1544). Their children included:

- Sir John North (c.1551–1597)
- Sir Henry North (1556–1620)

North was succeeded upon his death in 1600 by his grandson, Dudley North, 3rd Baron North, the son of Sir John North.

Political offices
Preceded by Sir Francis Knollys	Treasurer of the Household; 1596–1600	Vacant Title next held by Sir William Knollys
Unknown	Lord Lieutenant of Cambridgeshire; 1569–1600	Vacant Title next held by The Earl of Suffolk
Preceded by Sir James Dyer?	Custos Rotulorum of Cambridgeshire bef. 1573–1600	Succeeded by Sir John Cotton
Peerage of England
Preceded by Edward North	Baron North; 1564–1600	Succeeded by Dudley North
