= Francis North, 1st Baron Guilford =

English politician and judge (1637–1685)

The Right Honourable The Lord Guilford PC KC
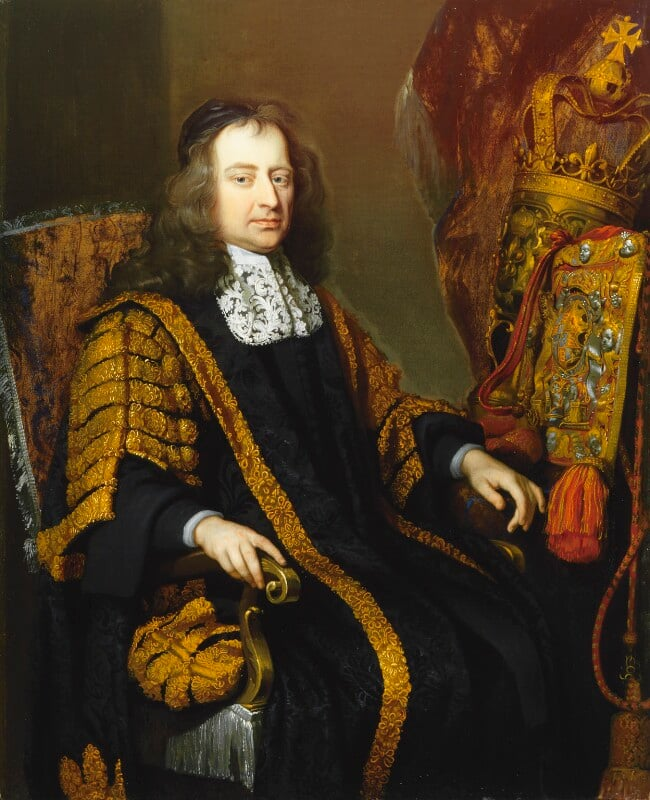
- Portrait by John Riley, c. 1682

Lord Keeper of the Great Seal
- In office 1682–1685
- Preceded by: The Earl of Nottingham
- Succeeded by: The Lord Jeffreys

Personal details
- Born: Francis North; 22 October 1637
- Died: 5 September 1685 (aged 47) Wroxton Abbey, Oxfordshire
- Education: St John's College, Cambridge

Francis North, 1st Baron Guilford (22 October 1637 – 5 September 1685) was an English politician and judge. He was the third son of Dudley North, 4th Baron North, and his wife Anne Montagu, daughter of Sir Charles Montagu of Boughton House and Mary Whitmore. He was created Baron Guilford in 1683, after becoming Lord Keeper of the Great Seal in succession to Lord Nottingham.

== Biography ==
Francis North was educated at St John's College, Cambridge and was admitted to the Middle Temple on 27 November 1655. He was Called to the Bar on 28 June 1661. He was an eminent lawyer, Solicitor-General (1671), Attorney-General (1673), and Chief Justice of the Common Pleas (1675), and in 1679 was made a member of the Privy Council Ministry and, on its dissolution, of the Cabinet. He was a man of wide culture and a staunch royalist, although he opposed the absolutist tendencies of Sunderland and Jeffreys, his two bitterest political enemies. He was a strong supporter of the royal prerogative, remarking that he did not see how any honest lawyer could oppose it, as all the precedents were in its favour. He became Lord Keeper of the Great Seal in 1682, an office tied with the one of Lord Chancellor at the time.

== Popish Plot and afterwards ==
Guilford sat as a judge at some of the Popish Plot trials, and like his colleagues, he has been accused of excessive credulity in believing the lies of Titus Oates and the other informers. On the other hand, it has been argued that the senior Chief Justice, Sir William Scroggs, so dominated the proceedings that none of the other judges had any influence on the outcome. If North succumbed to the prevailing hysteria, so did many others: his brother Roger wrote that "it was a time when wise men behaved like stark fools".

When public opinion finally began to turn against the Plot, the Crown moved against its instigators. North presided at the trial of one of the more disreputable of the Plot informers, Stephen College, nicknamed "the Protestant joiner", for high treason, in August 1681, and virtually ordered the jury to convict him. College was duly found guilty and hanged. North's conduct of the trial attracted a great deal of criticism, as the evidence of treason (College was accused of appearing in arms at the Oxford Parliament) was considered by many to be flimsy, and the charge had already been thrown out by a grand jury.

== Later years ==
Guilford was hostile to Lord Jeffreys, and regarded the future Lord Chief Justice, Sir Robert Wright, as utterly unfit for any judicial office; he was well qualified to assess Wright's ability since Wright as a young barrister had been a friend of his and had relied on North to write his legal opinions for him. He has been criticised for remaining in office after Wright was made Chief Justice over his vehement objections, especially as it must have been clear that he no longer had any influence over judicial appointments. On the other hand, he may have felt that keeping Jeffreys out of the Lord Chancellorship was a sufficient justification for clinging to office.

== Character ==
Guilford was generally respected for his integrity, (apart perhaps from his conduct of the trial of Stephen College), but he was sometimes accused of self-importance and a lack of any sense of humour; for example, he showed excessive agitation at the ridiculous rumour spread by Sunderland and Jeffreys that he had been seen riding on a rhinoceros. Sunderland hated North with a passion, describing him as the most unfit man who ever held his office: "partial, unreasonable, corrupt, arbitrary and ignorant". There is no reason to believe any of these accusations: certainly no one, other than Sunderland, seems to have thought that Guilford was either corrupt or ignorant.

== Death ==
Guilford died, it seems rather unexpectedly, at his country house, Wroxton Abbey, near Banbury, on 5 September 1685, aged only 47. Although he had apparently been suffering from stress and overwork, the precise reasons for his early death are unclear. His rather cryptic last words were: "It will not do".

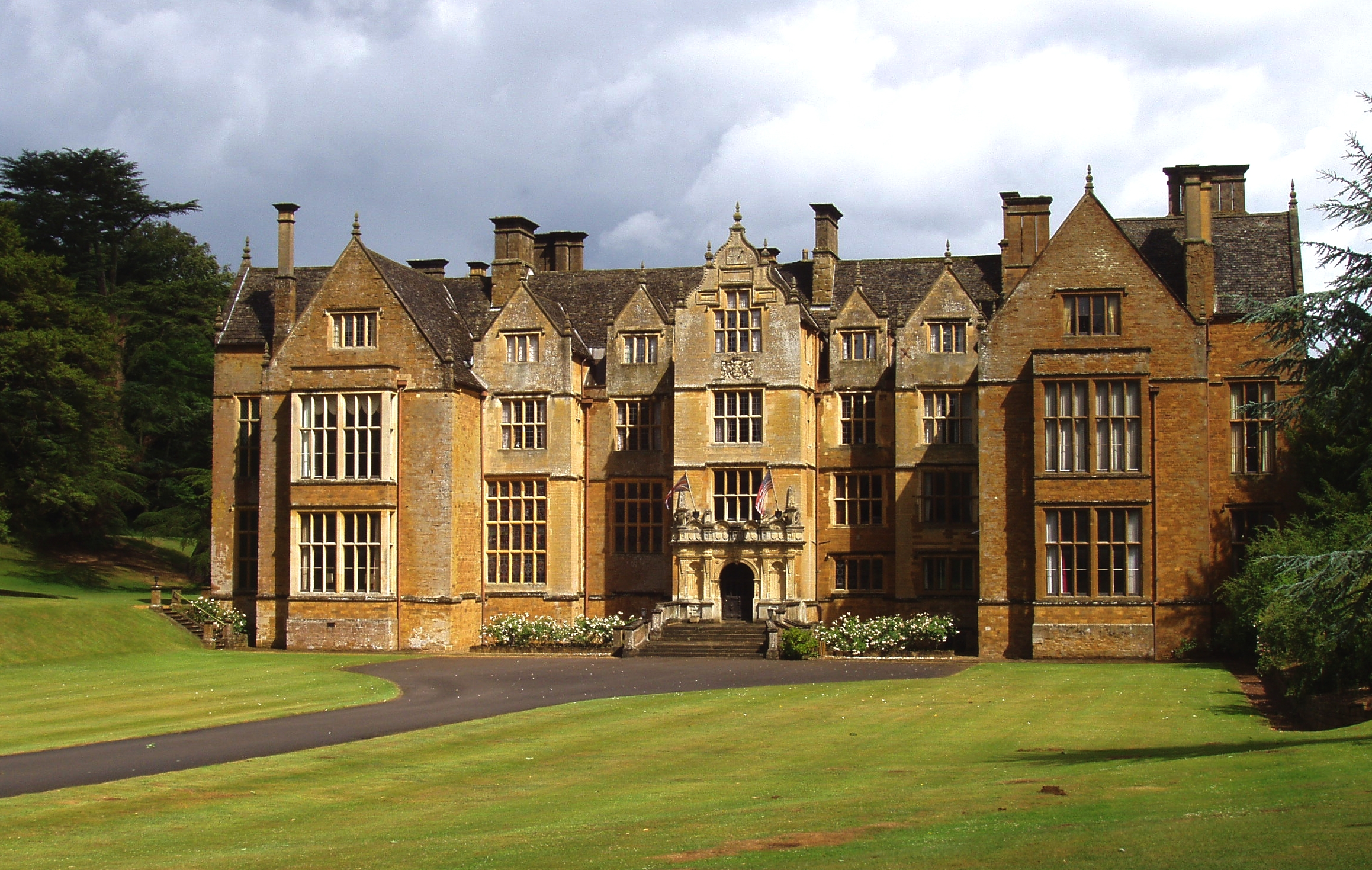
Wroxton Abbey, North's country seat

== Family ==
In 1672 he married Lady Frances Pope, daughter and co-heiress of Thomas Pope, 3rd Earl of Downe by his wife Beatrice (Beata) Poole, daughter of Henry Poole. Frances inherited the Wroxton estate. He was succeeded as 2nd baron by his only son Francis North, 2nd Baron Guilford (1673–1729).

== Works ==
Like many upper-class Englishmen of his time, North was devoted to music. Less typically for his time and class he had a keen interest in musical theory (as did his brother Roger), and published a book on the subject, A Philosophical essay on musick (1677), which has been praised as "an admirably clear exposition of the physical basis of music". Francis North's musical notations have been described as the earliest known examples of synthetic phonograms.

== Notes ==
Parliament of England
Preceded by Sir Robert Wright; John Coke	Member of Parliament for Kings Lynn; 1673–1675; With: Sir Robert Wright	Succeeded by Sir Robert Wright; Robert Coke
Legal offices
Preceded by Sir Edward Turnour	Solicitor General; 1671–1673	Succeeded by Sir William Jones
Preceded by Sir Heneage Finch	Attorney General; 1673–1683	Succeeded by Sir William Jones
Preceded by Sir John Vaughan	Chief Justice of the Common Pleas; 1675–1682	Succeeded by Sir Francis Pemberton
Political offices
Preceded by The Earl of Nottingham	Lord Keeper; 1682–1685	Succeeded by The Lord Jeffreys
Peerage of England
New creation	Baron Guilford; 1683–1685	Succeeded by Francis North
