= Peyton (name) =

Peyton is an English surname and a unisex given name. In Ireland it is known to have been among the anglicized forms of Ó Peatáin.

== Surname ==
- Balie Peyton (1803–1878), American lawyer and politician
- Ben Peyton (born 1977), British actor
- Benny Peyton (c. 1890 – 1965), American jazz drummer
- Bob Peyton (born 1954), English former footballer
- Brad Peyton (born 1980), Canadian-born film director
- Caroline Peyton (1951–2021), American singer and songwriter
- Claudia Jessie Peyton (born 1989), English actress
- Craig Peyton (born 1953), American producer
- Dave Peyton (c. 1885 – 1955), American songwriter, pianist, and arranger
- Edward Peyton (died 1749), officer of the Royal Navy
- Elizabeth Peyton (born 1965), American painter
- Ephraim G. Peyton (1802–after 1876), justice of the Mississippi Supreme Court
- Gerry Peyton (born 1956), English football player
- Sir Henry Peyton, 1st Baronet (1736–1789), MP for Cambridgeshire 1782–89
- Sir Henry Peyton, 2nd Baronet (1779–1854), MP for Cambridgeshire in 1802
- Sir Henry Peyton, 3rd Baronet (1804–1866), MP for Woodstock 1837–38
- Herb Peyton (born 1932), American entrepreneur and founder of Gate Petroleum in Jacksonville, Florida
- Jane Peyton (1870–1946), American actress
- John Peyton (disambiguation)
- Joseph Hopkins Peyton (1808–1845), American politician
- K. M. Peyton (1929–2023), British author
- Kate Peyton (1965–2005), Senior Producer for the BBC Johannesburg Bureau 2002–05
- Kim Peyton (1957–1986), competitive freestyle swimmer, Gold medalist for the United States at the 1976 Montreal Summer Olympics
- Malcolm Peyton (1932–2025), American composer, concert director, conductor, and teacher
- Marlowe Peyton (born 2004), American actor and singer
- Mike Peyton (1921–2017), British cartoonist
- Noel Peyton (1935–2023), Irish footballer
- Oliver Peyton (born 1963), Irish restaurateur and judge on the BBC television series Great British Menu
- Patrick Peyton (1909–1992), Irish-born American priest
- Robert Ludwell Yates Peyton (1822–1863), American politician and soldier
- Rog Peyton (born 1942), science fiction bookseller and editor
- Samuel Peyton (1804–1870), U.S. Representative from Kentucky
- Shelly Peyton, American chemist
- Tony Peyton (1922–2007), member of the Harlem Globetrotters basketball team
- Warren Peyton (born 1979), English footballer
- Whitney Peyton, American rapper from Philadelphia, Pennsylvania
- William Peyton (1866–1931), British general

== Given name ==
- Peyton (musician), singer-songwriter Peyton Nicole Booker
- Peyton Anderson (born 2001), American ice hockey player
- Peyton Bowen (born 2004), American football player
- Peyton H. Colquitt (1831–1863), Confederate Officer
- Peyton Dix, American writer and social media strategist
- Peyton Evans (1892–1972), former head coach of the University of Virginia college football program from 1916 to 1916
- Peyton Gordon (1870–1946), United States federal judge
- Peyton R. Helm, eleventh president of Muhlenberg College
- Peyton Hemp (born 2003), American ice hockey player
- Peyton Hendershot (born 1999), American football player
- Peyton Hillis (born 1986), American football player
- Peyton Kennedy (born 2004), American actress
- Peyton Krebs (born 2001), Canadian ice hockey player
- Peyton Elizabeth Lee (born 2004), American actress
- Peyton Lewis (born 2005), American football player
- Peyton List (born 1986), American actress
- Peyton List (born 1998), American actress
- Peyton M. Magruder (1911–1982), aircraft designer
- Peyton Manning (born 1976), American football player
- Peyton C. March (1864–1955), American soldier and Army Chief of Staff
- Peyton Meyer (born 1998), American actor
- Peyton Pallette (born 2001), American baseball player
- Peyton Parrish (born 1996), American musician
- Peyton Randolph (1721–1775), American politician
- Peyton Randolph (governor) (1779–1828), American politician
- Peyton Reed (born 1964), American director
- Peyton Sellers (born 1983), American race car driver, competing in the NASCAR Nationwide Series
- Peyton Short (1761–1825), land speculator and politician in Kentucky
- Peyton Siva (born 1990), American basketball player
- Peyton Stearns (born 2001), American tennis player
- Peyton Thompson (born 1990), American football player
- Peyton Watson (born 2002), American basketball player
- Peyton Williams (born 1998), American basketball player
- Peyton Woodring (born 2004), American football player
- Peyton Young (born 1945), American game theorist

== Fictional characters ==
- Kelly Peyton, character in the television series Alias
- Peyton (Chaotic) in Chaotic (TV series)
- Peyton Bragg, character in the 1959 novel Alas, Babylon
- Peyton Charles, in TV series iZombie
- Peyton Driscoll, in the television series CSI: NY
- Peyton Farquhar, character in the short story An Occurrence at Owl Creek Bridge by Ambrose Bierce
- Peyton Kelly, in 2007's The Game Plan (film)
- Peyton Leverett, in the 2011 film Sharpay's Fabulous Adventure
- Peyton Loftis, in the 1951's Lie Down in Darkness (novel) by William Styron
- Peyton Mott, in 1992's The Hand That Rocks the Cradle (1992 film)
- Peyton Sawyer, character in the television series One Tree Hill
- Peyton Westlake, in the 1990 film Darkman

== See also ==
- Peyton-Jones (disambiguation)
- Payton (given name)
- Payton (surname)
