= Henry Peyton =

Henry Peyton may refer to:

- Sir Henry Peyton, 1st Baronet (1736–1789), MP for Cambridgeshire 1782–89
- Sir Henry Peyton, 2nd Baronet (1779–1854), MP for Cambridgeshire in 1802
- Sir Henry Peyton, 3rd Baronet (1804–1866), MP for Woodstock 1837–38
- Henry Peyton (burgess) (1725–1781), Virginia planter and military officer who served in the House of Burgesses

== See also ==
- Henry Peyton Cobb (1835–1910), English banker, solicitor and Liberal politician
- Peyton (disambiguation)
