= Peyton baronets of Doddington (3rd creation, 1776) =

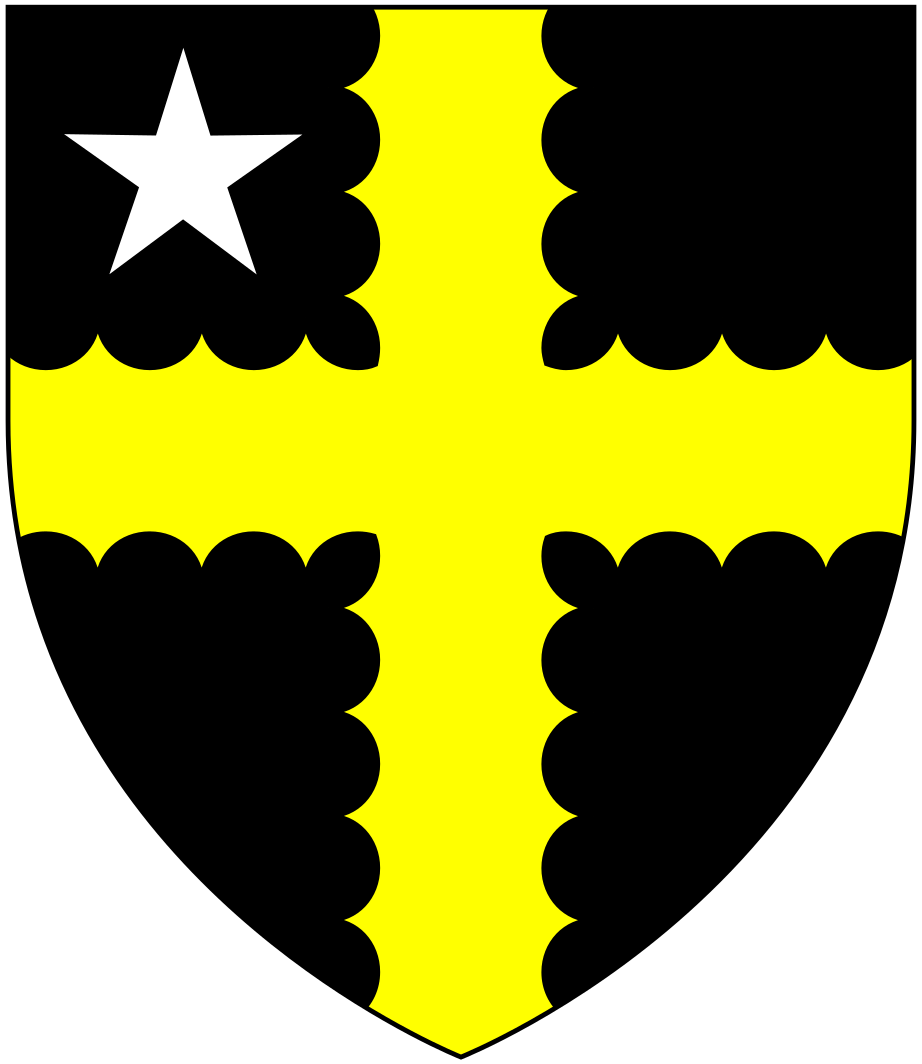
Escutcheon of the Peyton baronets of Doddington

The Peyton baronetcy, of Doddington in the County of Cambridge, was created for the third time on 18 September 1776 for Henry Dashwood, son of Margaret Peyton, daughter of Sir Sewster Peyton, 2nd Baronet of the second creation. Dashwood, who was related to the Dashwood baronets changed his name by Act of Parliament to Henry Dashwood Peyton. The 1st and 2nd Baronets sat as MPs for Cambridgeshire in 1782 and 1802 respectively.

From the time of the 2nd Baronet, the family had a seat at Swift's House, Stoke Lyne, Oxfordshire. The 2nd Baronet served as High Sheriff of Cambridgeshire and Huntingdonshire for 1808 and the 4th, 5th, 6th and 7th Baronets served as High Sheriff of Oxfordshire for 1871, 1881, 1896 and 1928 respectively.

The baronetcy became extinct on the death of the 7th Baronet in 1962.

== Peyton baronets, of Doddington (1776; Third creation) ==
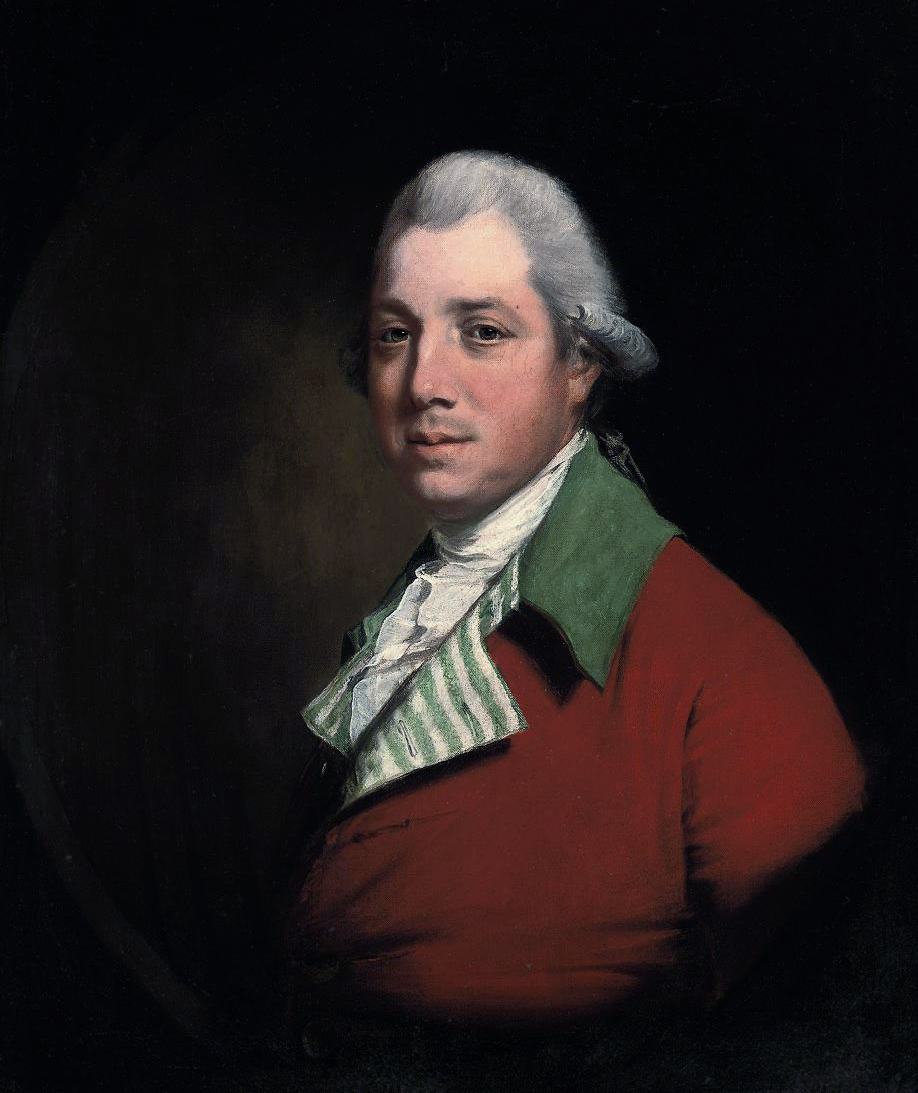
Sir Henry Dashwood Peyton, 1st Baronet (1736–1789)

- Sir Henry Dashwood Peyton, 1st Baronet (1736–1789).
- Sir Henry Peyton, 2nd Baronet (1779–1854)
- Sir Henry Peyton, 3rd Baronet (1804–1866)
- Sir Algernon Peyton, 4th Baronet (1833–1872)
- Sir Thomas Peyton, 5th Baronet (1817–1888)
- Sir Algernon Francis Peyton, 6th Baronet (1855–1916)
- Sir Algernon Thomas Peyton, 7th Baronet (1889–1962)

== Notes ==
Baronetage of Great Britain
Preceded by Laroche baronets	Peyton baronets of Doddington; 18 September 1776	Succeeded by Baker baronets
