= News Dispatch (set index) =

The News-Dispatch or News Dispatch may refer to:

- The News-Dispatch (1938–2020), is the former name and the current website for the La Porte County Herald-Dispatch, Michigan City, Indiana, U.S.
  - News-Dispatch Media, related media group that runs newspapers in southwest Michigan including Harbor Country News
- Valley News Dispatch, former daily newspaper for suburbs of Pittsburgh, Pennsylvania area, U.S., now Pittsburgh Tribune-Review
- Wilmington News-Dispatch (1895–1929), later Star-News, daily newspaper of Wilmington, North Carolina, U.S.

- The News-Dispatch, (1918–1981), also The Jeannette News (1914-1918. Publisher: Jeannette Pub. Co., Jeannette, Pa.), daily newspaper of Jeannette, Pennsylvania, U.S.
- Shamokin News-Dispatch (1933–1967), former daily newspaper of Shamokin, Pennsylvania, U.S., now The News-Item
- Latin America News Dispatch, student-run publication from New York University.

== See also ==
- Dispatch (disambiguation)
- The Dispatch (disambiguation)
- Dispatch News Service
