= Dispatch =

Dispatch or dispatches may refer to:

== Arts and entertainment ==
- Dispatch (band), an American jam band
  - Dispatch (EP), their 2011 extended-play release
- Dispatches (book), a 1977 book by Michael Herr about the Vietnam War
- Dispatch (video game), a 2025 video game developed by AdHoc Studio

== Media ==
=== Newspapers ===
==== United States ====
- Desert Dispatch, Barstow, California
- Cordele Dispatch, Georgia
- The Dispatch / The Rock Island Argus, daily newspaper of East Moline, Illinois
- Dispatch, which merged to form The Commercial Dispatch, Mississippi
- St. Louis Dispatch, which merged to form the St. Louis Post-Dispatch, daily newspaper of St. Louis, Missouri
- Hudson Dispatch, New Jersey
- New York Dispatch, New York, New York
- The Dispatch (Lexington), Lexington, North Carolina
- The Daily Dispatch, Henderson, North Carolina
- The Columbus Dispatch, daily newspaper of Columbus, Ohio
- Pittsburgh Dispatch, Pittsburgh, Pennsylvania
- The York Dispatch, York, Pennsylvania
- Dallas Dispatch, Texas
- Richmond Dispatch, which merged to form the Richmond Times-Dispatch, daily newspaper of Richmond, Virginia
- Dispatch, which merged to form The Herald-Dispatch, West Virginia

==== Elsewhere ====
- The Dispatch (Jammu and Kashmir), India
- Daily Dispatch, South Africa
- Sunday Dispatch (1801–1961), United Kingdom
- Daily Dispatch (UK), founded in 1900 and merged with the News Chronicle in 1955

=== Other media ===
- Dispatches (radio program), a Canadian radio program aired on CBC Radio One
- Dispatches (TV programme) (since 1987), a British documentary show broadcast on Channel 4
- Dispatches (magazine), a defunct 2008 political magazine
- The Dispatch, a political online magazine
- Dispatch News Service, a news agency
- Alaska Dispatch, a former news organization based in Anchorage, Alaska, from 2008 to 2014

== Other uses ==
- Citroën Dispatch, a small van
- Dispatch (sternwheeler), an early 20th century American steamboat
- Dispatch, Kansas, an unincorporated community in the US
- Dispatch (logistics), a procedure in logistics

== See also ==
- Despatch (disambiguation)
- Dispatched labor, an employment relationship
- Dispatcher, communications personnel
- The Dispatcher (disambiguation)
- Dispatcher Jeep, a postal Jeep used by the US Postal Service; see List of Jeep vehicles#DJ
- Dispatched, a Swedish death-metal band
- Dynamic dispatch, a computer-programming technique
- Instruction dispatch, in a CPU
- Mentioned in dispatches, an official military recognition (in various countries) for gallantry or commendable service
- Observer-Dispatch, daily newspaper of Utica, New York
- Weekly Dispatch (disambiguation)
