= Peyton =

Peyton may refer to:

== People and fictional characters ==
- Peyton (name), a list of people and fictional characters with the given name or surname
- Peyton (musician), American singer-songwriter Peyton Nicole Booker (born 1997)

== Places in the United States ==
- Peyton, Colorado, an unincorporated town and census-designated place
- Peyton, Claiborne County, Mississippi, an unincorporated community
- Peyton, Tunica County, Mississippi, a ghost town
- Peyton, Texas, an unincorporated community
- Peyton, Wisconsin, an unincorporated community
- Fort Peyton, constructed in 1837 to protect the St. Augustine, Florida, area during the Second Seminole War
- Peyton Field at Baker Stadium, Tacoma, Washington, a multi-purpose stadium
- Peyton Clark Cottage, historic cure cottage in New York

== Other uses ==
- Peyton baronets, five titles, all extinct
- USS Peyton (PF-91), a United States Navy patrol frigate which served in the Royal Navy as the frigate HMS Tortola (K595) from 1944 to 1945
- Peyton Company, a defunct wooden shipbuilding and dry dock company in Newport Beach, California, United States

== See also ==
- Peyton House (disambiguation), also Peyton Building
- Peyton Place (disambiguation)
- Payton (disambiguation)
- Paton (disambiguation)
