= Peyton baronets of Knowlton (1611) =

Escutcheon of the Peyton baronets of Knowlton

The Peyton baronetcy, of Knowlton in the County of Kent, was created in the Baronetage of England on 29 June 1611 for Samuel Peyton, son of Sir Thomas Peyton and his wife Ann Calthorpe, daughter of Sir Martin Calthorpe (died 1589), Lord Mayor of London. He was Member of Parliament for Sandwich in 1614. He was a second cousin of Sir John Peyton, 1st Baronet of Isleham of the other 1611 creation, as a grandson of John Peyton (died 1558), Member of Parliament for Winchelsea, second son of Robert Peyton I.

His son the 2nd Baronet sat in the Long Parliament for Sandwich from 1640 to 1643; and was again a Member of Parliament, for Kent in 1661. The baronetcy became extinct on his death.

== Peyton baronets, of Knowlton (1611) ==
- Sir Samuel Peyton, 1st Baronet (c.1590–1623)
- Sir Thomas Peyton, 2nd Baronet (c.1613–1684)

== Notes ==
Baronetage of England
Preceded by Tufton baronets	Peyton baronets of Knowlton; 29 June 1611	Succeeded by Morrison baronets
