= Despatch =

Despatch may refer to:

== Business ==
- despatch, the inverse of demurrage, paid by the shipowner to the charterer under a voyage charter when a ship is loaded or unloaded in less time than allowed in the charter party
- Merchants Despatch, a refrigerated freight transporting company, which founded the village of Despatch, New York

== Military terminology ==
- Despatch rider, a military motorcycle courier
- Mentioned in despatches, a military tradition for commending notable achievements
- Military communications, particularly historically

== Places ==
- Despatch, Eastern Cape, a small town near Uitenhage and Port Elizabeth in South Africa
- Despatch, New York, United States, village now known as "East Rochester"

== Ships ==
- Despatch (brig), ran aground near Newfoundland in 1828
- HMS Despatch, the name of various British Royal Navy ships
- USS Despatch, the name of various United States Navy ships
- Dispatch (sternwheeler), alternatively spelled Despatch, a steamboat in Oregon, United States, in the early 20th century

== Other uses ==
- Despatch (film), a 2024 Indian Hindi-language crime drama

== See also ==
- Dispatch (disambiguation)
