= St Clement's Church, Knowlton =

Coordinates: 51.2338°N 1.2669°E

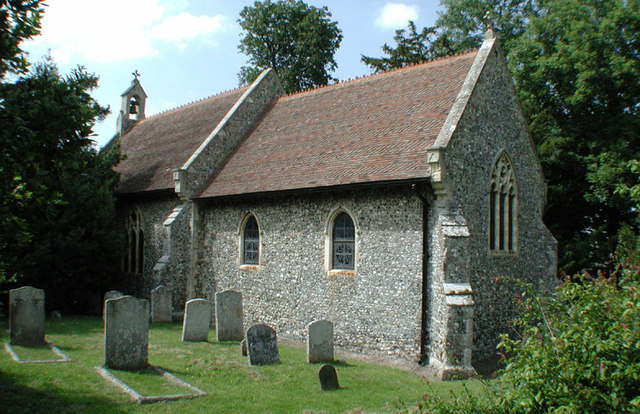
- St Clement's Church, Knowlton, from the southeast

- Location in Kent
- OS grid reference: TR 281 534
- Location: Knowlton, Kent
- Country: England
- Denomination: Anglican
- Website: Churches Conservation Trust

Architecture
- Functional status: Redundant
- Heritage designation: Grade I
- Designated: 11 October 1963
- Architect: William White (restoration)
- Architectural type: Church
- Style: Gothic, Gothic Revival

Specifications
- Materials: Flint, tiled roofs

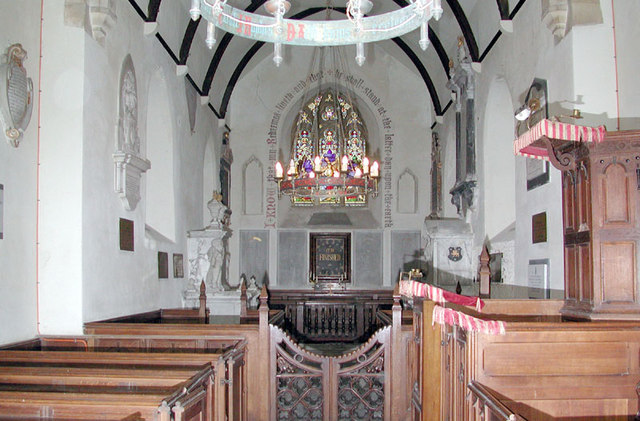
Interior

St Clement's Church is a redundant Anglican church in the village of Knowlton, Kent, England. It is recorded in the National Heritage List for England as a designated Grade I listed building, and is under the care of the Churches Conservation Trust. The church stands in the grounds of Knowlton Court.

== History ==
St Clement's dates from the 14th or the 15th century. It was originally the private chapel to Knowlton Court, and later a parish church. It was restored in 1855 by William White. Most of the windows date from this restoration. The church was vested in the Churches Conservation Trust on 1 December 1991. It is open daily for visitors. The church yard is owned and maintained by the Knowlton Estate

== Architecture ==
The church is constructed in flint and has a tiled roof. Its plan is simple, consisting of a nave and a chancel. At the west end is a bellcote. On the summits of the gables and the bellcote are cross finials. At the corners of the church, and at the junctions of the nave and chancel, are buttresses. In the west wall is a clock face.

Internally there is a plastered barrel roof. On the east wall of the church are a piscina and two niches. The pulpit is in 17th-century style, but probably dates from the 20th century. It is octagonal, and decorated with arcaded panels and a strapwork frieze. The font, the box pews, the corona lucis, the two reading desks, and other fittings date from the 19th century.

== Monuments ==
Over the north door are the carved and painted royal arms of Charles II. There is a hatchment in the chancel. The stained glass dates from the 1850s and 1860s and is by Lavers, Barraud and Westlake. The church also contains monuments to members of the families who lived in Knowlton Court, including the Peyton Baronets. Later residents of the house were the Narborough family. There is a memorial to Admiral Sir John Narborough who died in 1688, and to his sons John and James who, together with their stepfather Admiral Sir Cloudesley Shovell, died in a shipwreck off the Scilly Islands in 1707. The latter memorial has been attributed to Grinling Gibbons.

== External features ==
The churchyard wall, which dates partly from the early 18th century and partly from the early 20th century, is listed at Grade II. It consists of a red brick wall with simple wrought iron gates. On the gate piers are ball finials.

== See also ==
- List of churches preserved by the Churches Conservation Trust in South East England
