= D'Aeth baronets =

Escutcheon of the D'Aeth baronets of Knowlton

The D'Aeth Baronetcy, of Knowlton in the County of Kent, was a title in the Baronetage of Great Britain.

The baronetcy was created on 16 July 1716 for Thomas D'Aeth, Member of Parliament for Canterbury and Sandwich. He was the husband of Elizabeth Narborough, daughter of Rear-Admiral Sir John Narborough, who had become heir of her father on the early death of her two brothers (see Narborough Baronets). Through this marriage the Narborough family seat of Knowlton Court came into the D'Aeth family.

The family seat was Knowlton Court, Kent. The third Baronet inherited the manor of Bobbingworth in 1770, but by 1789 was heavily in debt, and sold off the Bobbingworth estate. The title became extinct on his death in 1808.

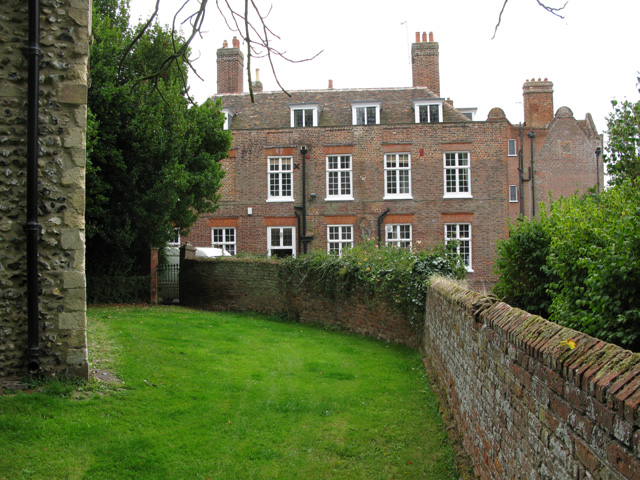
Knowlton Court

== D'Aeth baronets, of Knowlton (1716) ==
- Sir Thomas D'Aeth, 1st Baronet (4 December 1678 – 3 January 1745)
- Sir Narborough D'Aeth, 2nd Baronet (1708 – 8 October 1773)
- Sir Narborough D'Aeth, 3rd Baronet (c. 1750 – 6 April 1808)

Baronetage of Great Britain
Preceded by Perrott baronets	D'Aeth baronets of Knowlton; 16 July 1716	Succeeded by Decker baronets
