= D'Aeth =

D'Aeth is a surname. Notable people with the surname include:

- D'Aeth baronets
- Richard D'Aeth (1912–2008), British educationalist
