= Paton =

Paton may refer to:

== People ==
- Paton (surname)
- Gonzalo Basile (born 1974), Argentine boxer nicknamed "El Paton"
- Paton Price (1916–1982), American actor, director, and acting coach

== Places ==
- Hundred of Paton, one of the Hundreds in Palmerston County, Australia
- Paton, Iowa, United States, a city in Greene County
- Paton Township, Greene County, Iowa, a township
- Paton Peak, Beaufort Island, Ross Archipelago, Antarctica
- 2727 Paton, an asteroid

== Other uses ==
- Paton (motorcycles), Italian motorcycle manufacturer

== See also ==
- Batu Paton, a settlement in Sarawak, Malaysia
- Patons and Baldwins, leading British manufacturer of knitting yarn
- Payton (disambiguation)
- Peyton (disambiguation)
- Paitone
