= Narborough baronets =

Extinct baronetcy in the Baronetage of England

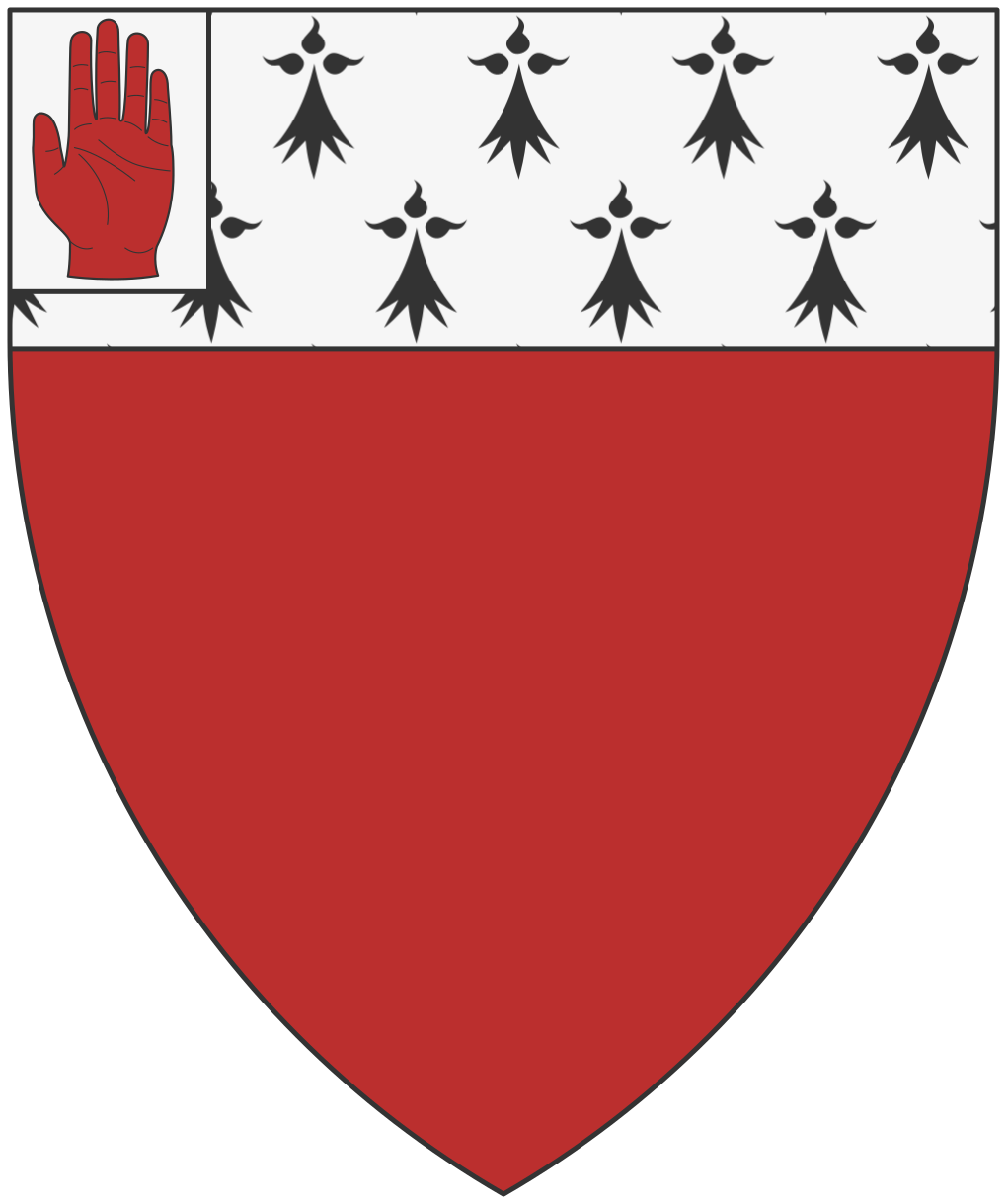
The coat of arms of the Narborough baronets

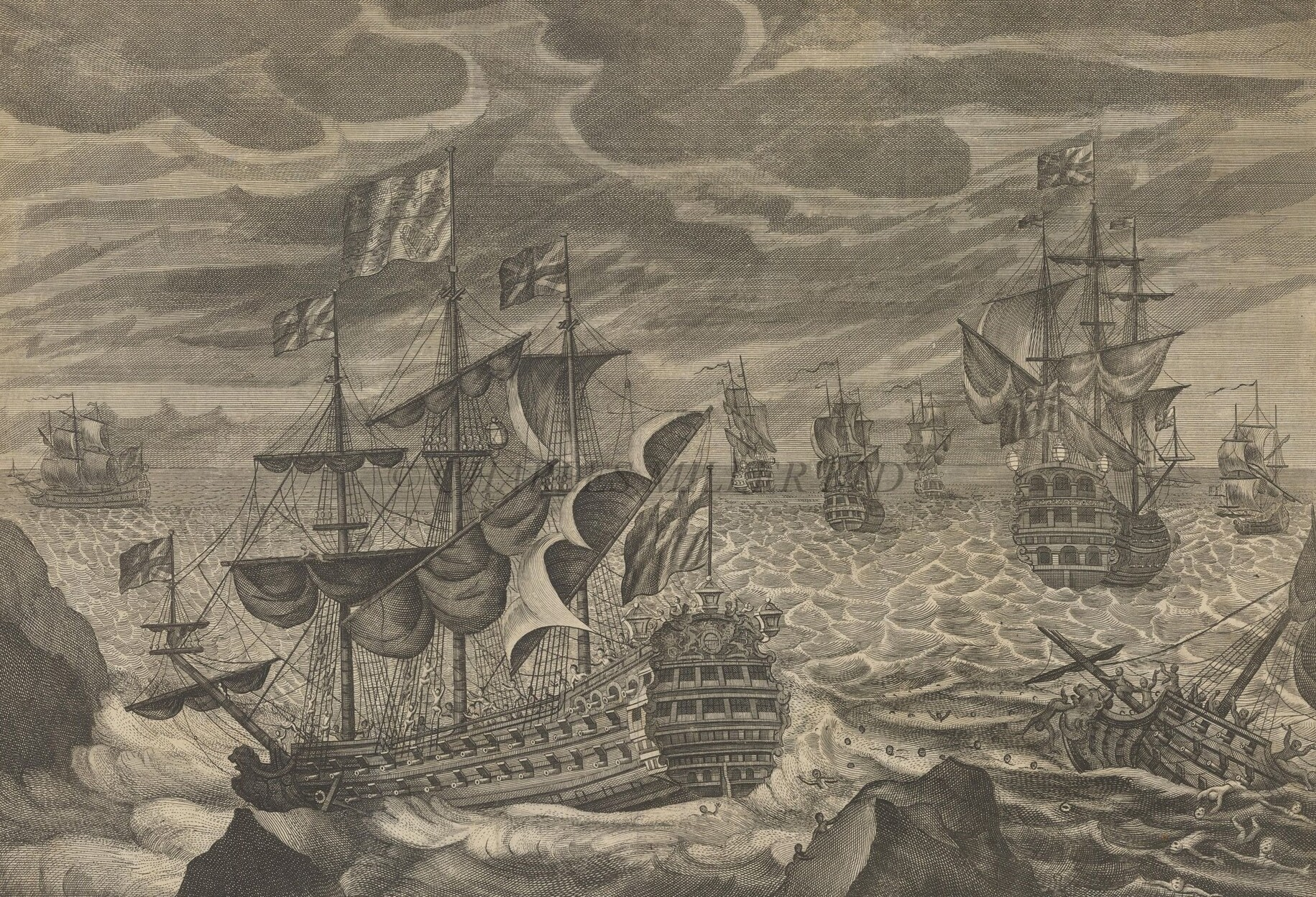
The Scilly naval disaster of 1707, which claimed the life of Sir John Narborough, Bt, and his younger brother

The Narborough baronetcy, of Knowlton in the County of Kent, was a title in the Baronetage of England. It was created on 15 November 1688 in honour of Admiral Sir John Narborough (who had died aboard his ship in May 1688) for his four-year-old son John, and with remainder to his younger brother, James.

The title became extinct when both brothers were lost in the Scilly naval disaster of 1707, alongside their stepfather, Admiral Sir Cloudesley Shovell. The brothers were buried in Old Town Church on St Mary's, Isles of Scilly, and are commemorated in Knowlton church, Kent. Their memorial displays an incredible rendition of the grounding of HMS Association and has been attributed to Grinling Gibbons.

The Narborough family seat was Knowlton Court. After the Narborough brothers' death, the family estates passed to their sister, Elizabeth, the wife of Thomas D'Aeth, who was himself created a baronet in 1716 (see D'Aeth baronets).

== Narborough baronets, of Knowlton (1688) ==
- Sir John Narborough, 1st Baronet (1684–1707)
