= Payton =

Payton may refer to:

- Payton (given name)
- Payton (surname)
- 85386 Payton, main-belt minor planet

== See also ==
- Peyton (disambiguation)
