= Francis Speed (English cricketer) =

English cricketer, barrister, stockbroker, and British Army officer

Personal information
- Full name: Francis Elmer Speed
- Born: 28 February 1859; Paddington, Middlesex, England
- Died: 23 August 1928 (aged 69); Goodnestone, Kent, England
- Batting: Right-handed

Domestic team information
- Years: Team
- 1882–1884: Marylebone Cricket Club

Career statistics
Competition	First-class
Matches	3
Runs scored	30
Batting average	6.00
100s/50s	–/–
Top score	16
Catches/stumpings	1/–
- Source: Cricinfo, 12 August 2021

Francis Elmer Speed (28 February 1859 — 28 August 1928) was an English first-class cricketer, barrister, stockbroker and British Army officer.

The son of William Speed, he was born at Paddington in February 1859. He was educated at Rugby School, where he played for and captained the school cricket eleven. A student of the Middle Temple, he was called to the bar to practice as a barrister in 1883. Described by Wisden as "a sound batsman and in the field, though not always, [a] wicket-keeper", Speed played first-class cricket for the Marylebone Cricket Club on three occasions, making two appearances in 1882 against Kent and Nottinghamshire, and one appearance in 1884 against Nottinghamshire. He scored 30 runs across his three matches, with a highest score of 16. In addition to playing first-class cricket, Speed also made minor appearances for Herefordshire.

Speed later changed professions and became a stockbroker. He also served in the Royal East Kent Yeomanry, being commissioned as a second lieutenant in March 1900. He served in South Africa in the Second Boer War. Speed was appointed High Sheriff of Kent in March 1914, having been unsuccessful in his 1912 and 1913 nominations. He was made a temporary major in the Yeomanry in May 1914 and served in the First World War and was attached to headquarters, before being restored to the Royal East Kent in November 1916. He was made up to the full rank of major in June 1917, before relinquishing his commission on account of ill health in September 1917. A justice of the peace for Kent, Speed lived out his final years in the county at Knowlton Court near the village of Goodnestone. He died there in August 1928.
