= Peyton-Jones =

Peyton-Jones or Peyton Jones may refer to:

- Julia Peyton-Jones (born 1952), British art director
- Simon Peyton Jones (born 1958), British computer scientist
- Samuel "Fireman Sam" Peyton-Jones, the titular character of Fireman Sam

== See also ==
- Peyton (name)
- Jones (surname)
