= Frederick Francis Baker =

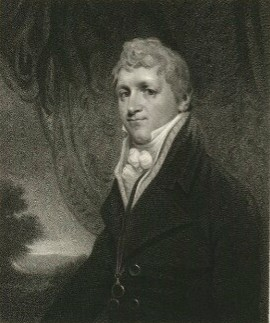
Sir Frederick Francis Baker, 2nd Baronet

Sir Frederick Francis Baker, 2nd Baronet (1772–1830) was a Fellow of the Royal Society.

== Life ==
He was the son of Sir George Baker, 1st Baronet, physician to George III, born 13 May 1772 in Westminster. Educated at Eton College, St John's College, Cambridge and Balliol College, Oxford (B.A. 1792, M.A. 1796), he was elected to the Royal Society in 1811. He died in a windmill accident near Hastings, on 1 October 1830.

== Family ==
Baker married in 1814 Harriet Simeon, youngest daughter of Sir John Simeon, 1st Baronet. They had three sons:

- Sir George Baker, 3rd Baronet
- Frederick Francis
- A son born in 1826

and a daughter Jane Maria, who in 1840 married the future Sir John Simeon, 3rd Baronet.

== Notes ==
Baronetage of Great Britain
Preceded by George Baker	Baronet (of Loventor); 1809–1830	Succeeded by George Baker
