= Sir George Baker, 1st Baronet =

British physician (1723–1809)

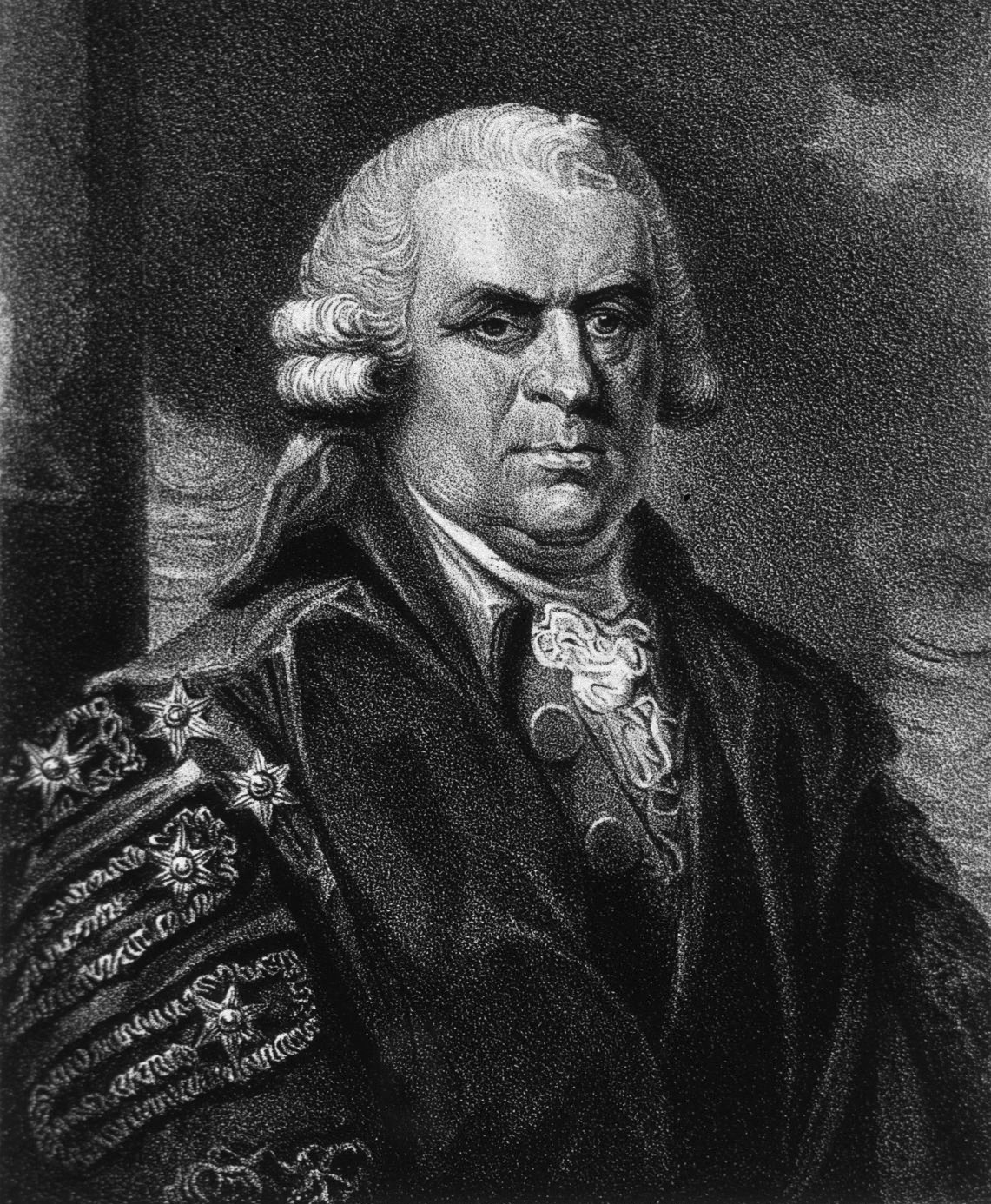
George Baker

Sir George Baker, 1st Baronet, FRS, FSA (1723 – 15 June 1809) was physician to King George III.

He was born in Modbury, Devon, the son of George Baker, vicar of Modbury. He was educated at Eton and King's College, Cambridge. In 1749 he went to Leyden University to study physic, becoming MD in 1756. He was admitted to the Royal College of Physicians in 1756 and became a fellow in 1757.

He moved to Stamford, Lincolnshire to practice medicine but returned to London around 1761 to become very successful, being elected President of the Royal College of Physicians nine times between 1785 and 1795.

In a presentation to the Royal College of Physicians he postulated that "Devonshire colic", a painful and occasionally fatal condition, was caused by lead poisoning from drinking cider. When lead was removed from the cider manufacturing process the problem disappeared.

He was appointed physician to the Queen's household and then physician to King George III, attending the king during his periods of madness. He was created Baronet Baker of Loventor in Totnes, Devon on 26 August 1776.

He was a good classical scholar and fluent in Latin and Greek. He published a number of papers in Latin. He was elected a Fellow of the Royal Society in 1762 and Fellow of the Society of Antiquaries. He was also made an honorary fellow of the Royal College of Physicians of Edinburgh and a foreign fellow of the Royal Society of Medicine of Paris.

He died in 1809, at the age of 87, and was buried at St James's Church, Piccadilly, where a plain mural tablet to the north of the Communion table records his death. He had married Jane Morris, daughter of Roger Morris and Elizabeth Jackson, on 28 June 1768 at St. James's, Westminster. They had two children, of whom Sir Frederick inherited the baronetcy.

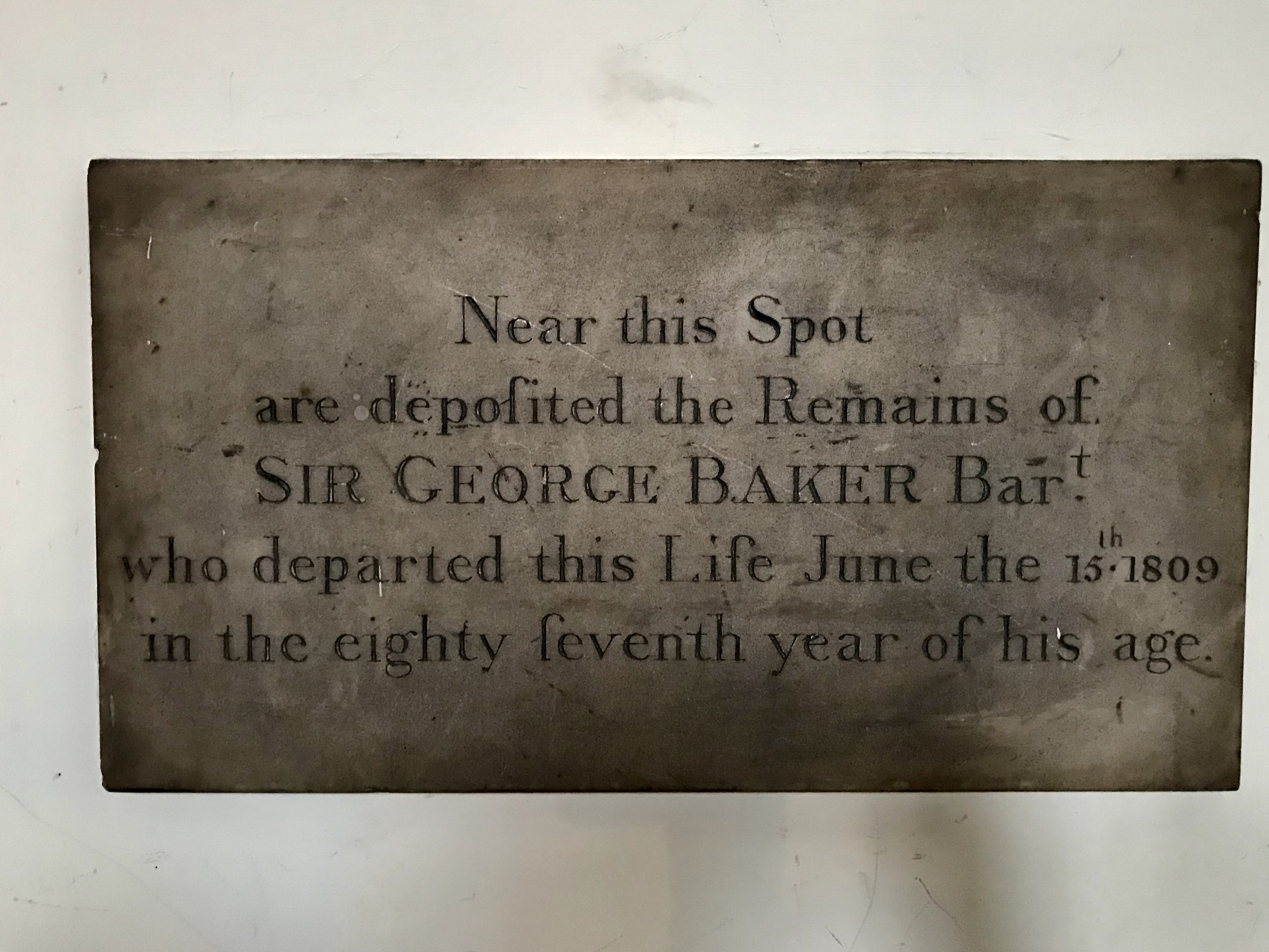
A memorial to Sir George Baker, 1st Baronet, in St James's Church, Piccadilly.

== Sectioned ==
- Leigh Rayment's Peerage Pages
- Biography, Royal College of Physicians, Retrieved 6 January 2023.

Baronetage of Great Britain
New creation	Baronet (of Loventor); 1776–1809	Succeeded by Frederick Francis Baker
