= Payton (surname) =

Payton is a surname. Notable people with the surname include:

- Albert Payton (1898–1967), English cricketer
- Alvin Payton, American politician
- Andy Payton (born 1967), English former professional footballer
- Asie Payton (1937–1997), American blues musician
- Barbara Payton (1927–1967), American film actress
- Benjamin F. Payton (1932–2016), African-American university president
- Bob Payton (1944–1994), American marketing man, restaurateur and hotelier
- Boyd E. Payton, (1908–1984), labor organizer born in Bobbin, West Virginia
- Bre Payton (1992–2018), American conservative writer
- Brian Payton (born 1966), American writer
- Bryan Payton (born 1986), professional Canadian football linebacker
- Carolyn R. Payton (1925–2001), American psychologist, Director of the United States Peace Corps
- Catherine Payton, later known as Catherine Payton Phillips, Quaker minister
- Charles Payton (born 1960), American former professional basketball player
- Charles Alfred Payton (1843–1926), British adventurer, fisherman, diplomat and writer
- Claude Payton (1882–1955), American actor
- Clement W. Payton (1897–1918), English World War I flying ace
- Cole Payton (born 2002), American football player
- David Payton (born 1952), New Zealand diplomat
- Denis Payton (1943–2006), English saxophonist
- Dermot Payton (born 1945), New Zealand cricketer
- Dion Payton (1950–2021), American Chicago blues guitarist and singer
- Eddie Payton (born 1951) former American football player
- Edward William Payton (1859–1944), photographer and painter in New Zealand
- Elfrid Payton (born 1967), Canadian football player
- Elfrid Payton, Jr. (born 1994), American basketball player
- Estella Payton (1904–1999), American television cook
- Gary Payton (born 1968), American basketball player
- Gary Payton II (born 1992), American basketball player and son of the above
- Gary E. Payton (born 1948), American astronaut
- Hannah Payton (born 1994), British professional racing cyclist
- James Payton, American history professor
- Jarrett Payton (born 1980), professional American and Canadian football player; son of football player Walter Payton
- Jay Payton (born 1972), American former baseball player
- Jo Marie Payton (born 1950), American television actress
- John Payton (1946–2012), African-American civil rights attorney
- John Payton (politician) (born 1967), automobile dealer, Republican member of the Arkansas House of Representatives
- John Payton Snr, founding president of the Australian Music Association
- Jordan Payton (born 1993), American football player
- Khary Payton (born 1972), American actor
- Lawrence Payton (1938–1997), American singer, songwriter and record producer
- Lucy Payton (1877–1969), American silent film actress
- Mark Payton (born 1991), American professional baseball player
- Mel Payton (1926–2001), American professional basketball player
- Michael Payton (1970–2018), American football quarterback
- Muirceartach Ua Peatáin (died 1178), Irish chieftain
- Naomi Payton (born 2003), Japan voice actor, singer and idol
- Nicholas Payton (born 1973), American jazz trumpeter and keyboard player
- Patrick Payton (born 2002), American football player
- Philip Payton (born 1953), British historian
- Philip A. Payton, Jr. (1876–1917), African American real estate entrepreneur
- Rico Payton (born 1999), American football player
- Sean Payton (born 1963), head coach of the NFL's Denver Broncos since 2023
- Stephen Payton, British Paralympian athlete
- Sue C. Payton, American technologist, Assistant Secretary of the Air Force
- Tony Payton (born 1981), American politician, member of the Pennsylvania House of Representatives
- Walter Payton (1954–1999), American football player
- Walter Payton (musician) (1942–2010), American jazz bassist and sousaphonist
- Wilfred Payton (1882–1943), English cricketer
- Wilfred Payton (priest) (1913–1989), English clergyman and cricketer

== See also ==
- Payton (given name)
- Peyton (name), given name and surname
- Paton (surname)
- Paynton
- Pyton
