= Baker Wilbraham baronets =

Title in the Baronetage of Great Britain

Baker Wilbraham baronets, of Loventor
- Escutcheon of the Baker Wilbraham baronets
- Motto: In portu quies (There is rest in port)
- Arms: Quarterly, 1st and 4th, Argent three Bends wavy Azure a Canton Ermine (Wilbraham); 2nd and 3rd, Per pale Argent and Or on a Saltire nebuly Sable five Escallops of the first on a Chief of the third a Lion passant of the second (Baker)
- Crest: 1st, A Wolf's Head erased Argent charged on the neck with a Cross Crosslet Azure (Wilbraham); 2nd, A Dexter Arm embowed vested Azure charged with three Annulets interlaced Or cuffed Argent holding in the Hand proper an Arrow of the last (Baker)

The Baker, later Rhodes, later Baker Wilbraham Baronetcy, of Loventor in the County of Devon, is a title in the Baronetage of Great Britain. It was created on 19 September 1776 for George Baker, Physician to George III and President of the Royal College of Physicians. His son, Sir Frederick Francis Baker, 2nd Baronet, FRS was accidentally killed by the vane of a windmill.

The 4th Baronet (the title having descended from father to son), assumed in 1878 by Royal licence the surname of Rhodes in lieu of his patronymic. He did not marry. He was succeeded by his younger brother, the 5th Baronet. He married Katharine Frances, daughter and heiress of General Sir Richard Wilbraham, nephew of Edward Bootle-Wilbraham, 1st Baron Skelmersdale. In 1900 he assumed by Royal licence the additional surname of Wilbraham. His son, the 6th Baronet, served as First Church Estates Commissioner, as Chancellor of the Dioceses of York, Truro, Chelmsford and Durham and as Vicar-General of the Provinces of York and Canterbury.

The family seat is Rode Hall, Cheshire.

== Baker, later Rhodes, later Baker Wilbraham baronets, of Loventor (1776) ==
- Sir George Baker, 1st Baronet, (c.1723–1809), FRS, Physician to George III
- Sir Frederick Francis Baker, 2nd Baronet (1772–1830), FRS
- Sir George Baker, 3rd Baronet (1816–1882)
- Sir Frederick Edward Rhodes, 4th Baronet (1843–1911)
- Sir George Barrington Baker Wilbraham, 5th Baronet (1845–1912)
- Sir Philip Wilbraham Baker Wilbraham, 6th Baronet KBE (1875–1957)
- Sir Randle John Baker Wilbraham, 7th Baronet (1906–1980)
- Sir Richard Baker Wilbraham, 8th Baronet (1934–2022)
- Sir Randle Baker Wilbraham, 9th Baronet (born 1963)

The heir apparent is the current holder's son, Rafe George William Baker Wilbraham (born 1999).

Baronetage of Great Britain
Preceded by Peyton baronets	Baker baronets of Loventor; 19 September 1776	Succeeded by Eden baronets
