= Sir Thomas Peyton, 2nd Baronet =

English politician (1613–1684)

Sir Thomas Peyton MP, JP
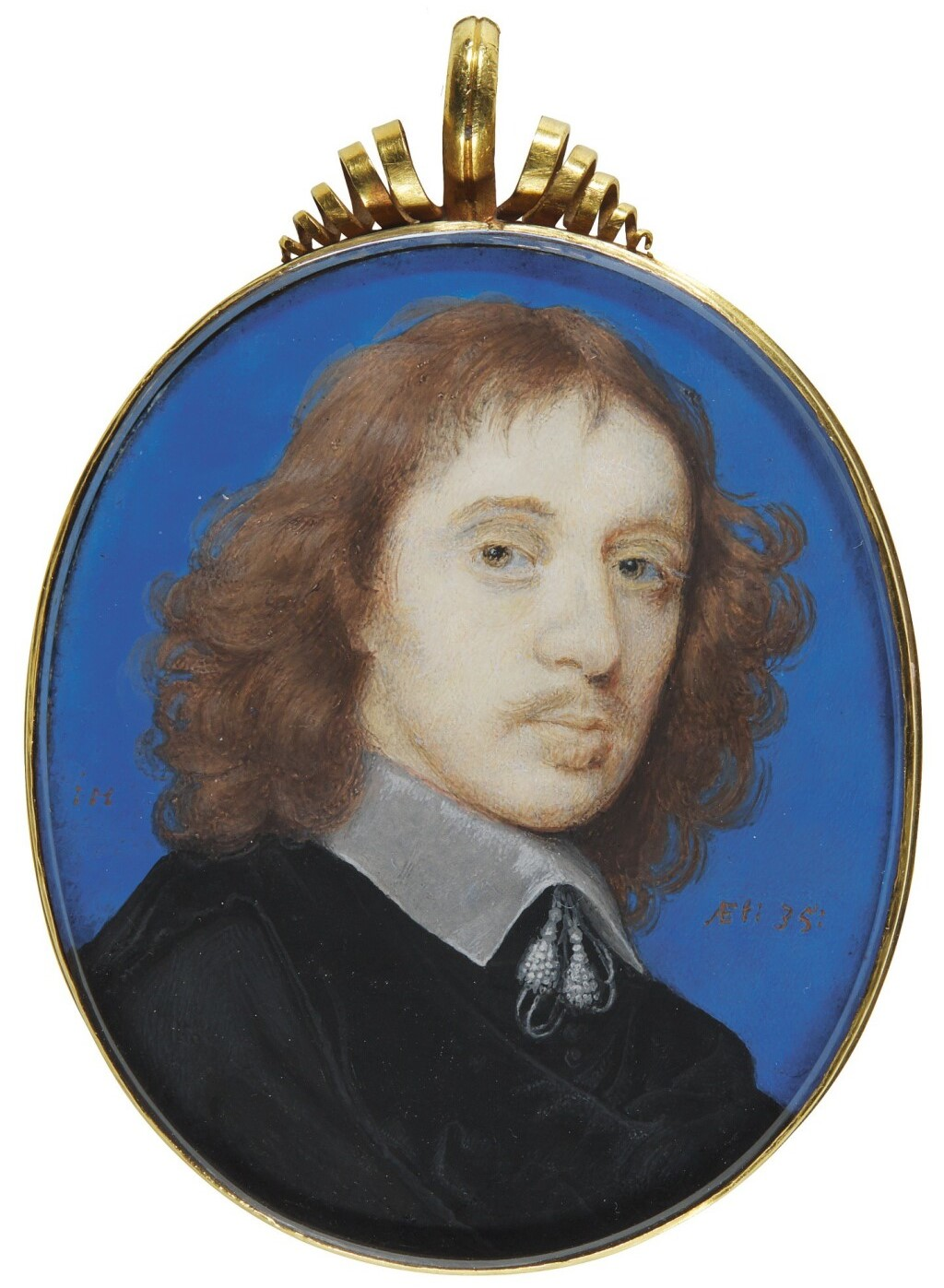

Member of Parliament for Kent
- In office May 1661 – January 1679

Deputy Lord Lieutenant of Kent
- In office May 1660 – February 1684

Member of Parliament for Sandwich
- In office November 1640 – February 1644 (excluded)

Personal details
- Born: 13 August 1613 Knowlton Court, Kent
- Died: 11 February 1684 (aged 70) London
- Resting place: Westminster Abbey
- Spouse(s): (1) Elizabeth Osborne (1636–1642) (2) Cecilia Clerke (1648–1661) (3) Jane Monins (1667–1672)
- Children: Four daughters

Military service
- Allegiance: Royalist
- Battles/wars: Second English Civil War

Sir Thomas Peyton, 2nd Baronet, 18 August 1613 to 11 February 1684, was a member of the landed gentry from Knowlton Court in Kent. He supported the Royalists in the War of the Three Kingdoms, and took part in a number of conspiracies to restore Charles II of England during the 1649 to 1660 Commonwealth period.

After the Stuart Restoration in May 1660, Peyton was appointed Deputy Lord Lieutenant of Kent, and elected Member of Parliament for Kent. Despite receiving a number of lucrative government positions, he was in dire financial difficulties when he died in February 1684, leaving four daughters, and his lands were sold.

Shortly before fleeing into exile in 1660 to escape prosecution as a regicide, his neighbour John Dixwell sold Peyton part of his Broome Park estate. In return, one of Peyton's daughters married his nephew Basill Dixwell, which appears to have been a successful attempt to protect his property from confiscation.

== Personal details ==
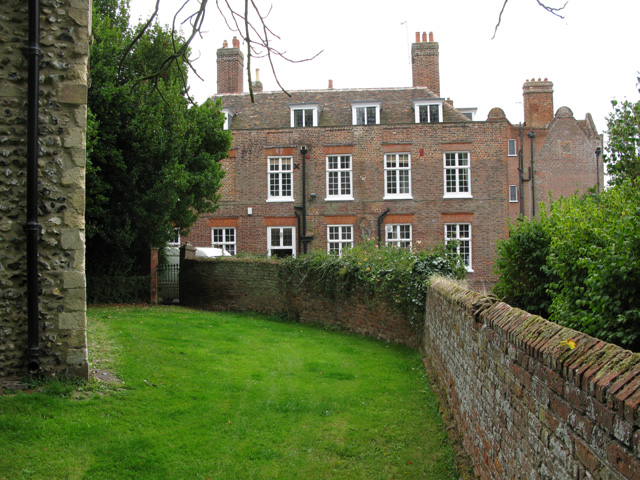
Knowlton Court, Kent

Peyton was the son of Sir Samuel Peyton, 1st Baronet, of Knowlton, and his wife Mary Aston, daughter of Sir Roger Aston. He inherited the baronetcy and Knowlton Court on the death of his father in 1623.

In November 1640, Peyton was elected Member of Parliament for Sandwich in the Long Parliament. He was disabled from sitting in 1644 for supporting the king and was subsequently a member of The Action Party, a group of radicals dedicated to bringing down the Protectorate government. At some point around 1655, he was imprisoned in the Tower of London; on 7 August that year, Oliver Cromwell ordered John Barkstead, Lieutenant of the Tower of London, to allow Sir Thomas 'a prisoner in the Tower' leave 'for thirty-six days to take the waters at Tunbridge Wells'. (Beloe Papers catalogue, MS3273, Lambeth Palace Library, accessed via National Archives website, 4 May 2021.)

After the Restoration, Peyton was elected MP for Kent from 1661 to 1679 in the Cavalier Parliament.

Peyton died aged 70 in financial difficulty.

Peyton had married three times; firstly a daughter of Sir Peter Osborne, secondly Cecilia Swan, widow of Sir William Swan, and thirdly Jane Monins, daughter of Sir William Monins. He left four daughters, who sold Knowlton Court to Admiral Sir John Narborough.

== Sources ==
- Handley, Stuart (2002). DIXWELL, Sir Basill, 2nd Bt. (1665-1750), of Broome, Barham, Kent in The History of Parliament: the House of Commons 1690–1715. Boydell and Brewer. ISBN 978-1107002258.
- Henning, Basil (1983). PEYTON, Sir Thomas, 2nd Bt. (1613-84), of Knowlton, Kent in The History of Parliament: the House of Commons 1660–1690. Boydell and Brewer. ISBN 978-1107002258.

Parliament of England
Parliament suspended since 1629	Member of Parliament for Sandwich; 1640–1644; With: Sir Edward Partridge	Succeeded by Peyton disabled from sitting - seat vacant Sir Edward Partridge
Preceded by Sir Edward Dering; Sir John Tufton	Member of Parliament for Kent; 1661–1679; With: Sir John Tufton	Succeeded by Sir Vere Fane; Sir Edward Dering
Baronetage of England
Preceded by Samuel Peyton	Baronet (of Knowlton); 1623–1684	Extinct
