= Mort Rosenblum =

- Occupations: Author, Journalist, editor

Mort Rosenblum (born 1943), is an American author, editor and journalist.

== Biography ==
Rosenblum directs Reporting Unlimited, which includes the Mort Report: Non-Prophet Journalism, magazine assignments and book projects. Since 1963, he has reported on seven continents from about 200 countries and territories. At 17, Rosenblum left the University of Arizona in Tucson to work at the Mexico City Times and then wrote for the Caracas Daily Journal. After returning for a B.A. at the University of Arizona, he joined the Associated Press at Newark in 1965.

His international career began in 1967, when the AP sent him to cover mercenary wars in Congo. Since then Rosenblum has run AP bureaus in Kinshasa, Lagos, Kuala Lumpur, Jakarta, Singapore, Buenos Aires, and Paris. From 1979 to 1981, he was editor of the International Herald Tribune but later returned to AP as special correspondent, based in Paris.

External videos
- Booknotes interview with Rosenblum on Back Home, October 1, 1989, C-SPAN

Rosenblum left AP in 2004, and in 2008, launched dispatches, a quarterly magazine with co-editor Gary Knight and publisher Dr. Simba Gill. Later, he later directed a worldwide investigation, "Looting the Seas," for the International Consortium of Investigative Journalists. Rosenblum is professor emeritus of journalism at the University of Arizona, Tucson.

== Honors and accomplishments ==
Rosenblum won an Overseas Press Club Award for reporting on the Iron Curtain collapse in 1989. Additionally, he won AP's top reporting award in 1990, 2000 and 2001. His book, "Olives," received the James Beard Award. He was an Edward R. Murrow at the Council on Foreign Relations.

== Books ==
- Little Bunch of Madmen: Elements of Global Reporting (2010)
- Escaping Plato's Cave (2007)
- Chocolate: A Bittersweet Saga of Dark and Light (2006)
- A Goose in Toulouse (2000)
- Olives: The Life and Lore of a Noble Fruit (2000)
- The Secret Life of the Seine (1995)
- Who Stole the News? (1993)
- The Abortion Pill (1991) With Etienne-Emile Baulieu.
- Squandering Eden (1990)
- Moments of Revolution - Eastern Europe (1990)
- Back Home: A Foreign Correspondent Rediscovers America (1989)
- Mission to Civilize (1988)
- Coups and Earthquakes (1981)
