= The Dispatcher (disambiguation) =

The Dispatcher is a 2016 science fiction novella by John Scalzi.

The Dispatcher may also refer to:

- The Dispatcher (2011 novel), a 2011 crime novel by Ryan David Jahn
- The Dispatcher (TV series), working title of 2026 series Last Seen, based on the Jahn novel

== See also ==
- Dispatch (disambiguation)
- Dispatcher
- Emergency medical dispatcher
- Train dispatcher
