= Payton (given name) =

Unisex given name

- Gender: Unisex

Origin
- Origin: English
- Meaning: "fighting man's estate"

Other names
- Related names: Peyton

Payton is a given name in use in English speaking countries. One source indicates the name comes from a surname derived from a place name meaning "Pœga's town" in Old English. Another source indicates the name means "fighting man's estate".

The name is popular for both boys and girls in the United States. It was the 278th most popular name for American boys born there in 2007 and the 152nd most popular name for girls. It was the 85th most popular name for girls born in British Columbia, Canada in 2006. Peyton, a spelling variant, was the 125th most popular name for boys born in 2007 in the United States and the 121st most popular name for girls.

== Notable people with the given name Payton include ==
- Payton Banks (born 1981), American professional wrestler
- Payton Chadwick (born 1995), American heptathlete and hurdler
- Payton Eeles (born 1999), American baseball player
- Payton Haas (born 1979), American actor
- Payton Hazzard (born 1993), Grenadian sprinter
- Payton Henry (born 1997), American baseball player
- Payton Jordan (1917–2009), American track and field coach
- Payton Koch (born 1996), American film editor
- Paetyn Levis (born 1999), American ice hockey player
- Payton Linnehan (born 2001), American soccer player
- Payton Otterdahl (born 1996), American shot putter
- Payton Page (born 2002), American football player
- Payton Pardee (born 1996), American football coach
- Peyton Parrish (born 1996), American musician
- Payton Pierce (born 2004), American football player
- Payton Pritchard (born 1998), American basketball player
- Payton Ridenour (born 2002), American BMX rider
- Payton Sandfort (born 2002), American basketball player
- Payton Smith (born 2000), American singer-songwriter
- Payton Spencer (born 2004), New Zealand rugby union footballer
- Payton Talbott (born 1998), American mixed martial artist
- Payton Thorne (born 2001), American football player
- Payton Turner (born 1999), American football player
- Payton Verhulst (born 2003), American basketball player
- Payton Willis (born 1998), American basketball player
- Payton Wilson (born 2000), American football player

== See also ==
- Peyton (name), given name and surname
- Payton (surname)
