= USS Despatch =

USS Despatch may refer to the following ships of the United States Navy:

- USS Despatch (1814), a schooner in commission from 1814 to 1820
- USS Despatch (1852), a sloop-of-war in commission from 1856 to 1859, which was recommissioned as USS Pocahontas in 1860, served in the American Civil War, and was decommissioned a final time in 1865
- USS Despatch (1873), a screw steamer in commission from 1873 to 1891, which served as the first Presidential yacht from 1880 until 1891
- USS Despatch (1902), a ferry launch in commission as USS Steam Cutter No. 423 1902–1908, as USS Despatch 1908–1918, and as USS Hustle 1918–1921, being designated YFB-6 in 1921
- USS Despatch (SP-68), redesignated PY-8 in 1920, a tender with the Atlantic Fleet in commission as USS Vixen (SP-68) briefly in 1917, then as USS Despatch (SP-68) from 1917 to 1919 and again in 1920, and as USS Despatch (PY-8) from 1920 to 1921
- USS Despatch (IX-2), a receiving ship in service under the name from 1940 to 1946, which previously had been the protected cruiser Boston and which was renamed Despatch in 1940 to free the name Boston for the new heavy cruiser USS Boston (CA-69).
