= Muirceartach Ua Peatáin =

Muirceartach Ua Peatáin (fl. 1178) was an Irish chief.

== Biography ==
Ua Peatáin was a member of the Cinel Moain who was killed in 1178 in an attack in revenge for the death of Randal mac Eachmarcach Ua Cathain (see Ó Catháin. Writing in 1971, F.B. Payton believed that "Muirceartach ... was of some eminence amongst the Cinel Moain, probably the chief of the name, since usually only persons of importance are mentioned in the Annals." The person killed alongside him, Galagh Ua Luinigh, was of a family who were once chiefs of Cenél Máién (commonly known as the Cenél Moan).

== Family background ==
An account of the family was preserved by Dubhaltach MacFhirbhisigh, who recorded that they descended from one Fianbheartach mac Endalaig, a gr-gr-gr-gr-grandson of Niall of the Nine Hostages. Fianbheartach was the ancestor of the Cenél Moen Iochtarach, while his brother, Tendalach, was ancestor of the Cenél Moen Uachtarach.

Fianbheartach's great-grandson, Gairbheth son of Dongaile mac Tuathgaile, was the ancestor of the Ó Gairbeth and Ó Peatáin families. The Uí Peatáin resided in what is now the barony of Raphoe in County Donegal, regularly in dispute between the rival clans of Uí Domhnaill and Uí Neill. Payton states that most of the Cenél Moen families were driven out of their homeland and east over the Foyle river - "This journey was probably completed by the end of the 13th century, and the O Gormley's, chiefs of the Cinel Moain, thereafter held sway over a territory which extended from Derry to Strabane."

By the 16th century members of the family were listed among the followers of the Uí Domhnaill. During the 17th century, some of the name removed to Connacht, their descendants being found in County Mayo and County Roscommon especially. By then, the surname was anglicised to Payton, Patton, and other variants.

== Extract from the Annals of the Four Masters ==
Concobhar mac Conallaigh Ui Luinigh do gabháil toisigheachta Cenéil Moen & Domhnall mac Domhnaill Ui Gairmleadhaigh do ionnarbhadh a Maigh Ithe i n-Inis Eoghain dochum Donnchadha Uí Dhuibhdhiorma. Cenél Moién i c-cionn ráithe iaramh do chur Concobhair mic Conallaigh a toisigheacht, & a c-cennus do thabhairt do Dhomhnall mac Domhnaill Ui Gairmleadhaigh. Muinnter Domhnaill .i. mac Giollu Caech Uí Ederla & Uí Flannagáin do mharbhadh Concobhair mic Conallaigh i t-toigh Domhnaill feisin i meabhail ar comairce aircinnigh na h-Ernaidhe boi i n-a farradh an tan-sin. Ro ionnarbsat iaramh Cenél Moáin Domhnall Ua Gairmleadhaigh a toisigheacht & tugsat Ruaidhri Ua Flaithbertaigh i c-cennus foraib. Meabhal do dhenamh la tribh macaibh Ui Fhlaithbertaigh for Cenél Moáin. Domhnall mac Domhnaill Ui Ghairmleadhaigh do mharbhadh leo, & Ticchernan mac Raghnaill Mic Domhnaill & ochtar do mhaithibh Cenél Moáin immaille friu. Raghnall mac Eachmarcaigh Uí Chatháin do mharbhadh la Cenél Moáin a t-tosach an t-samhraidh-sin cona i n-a dhioghail-sidhe do-rochair Galach Ua Luinigh & Muircheartach Ua Peatain, & as na dioghail bheós do-ronadh in meabail remraite for Cenél Moáin

Conor, the son of Cu Allaidh O'Loony, assumed the chieftainship of Kinel-Moen; and Donnell, the son of Donnell O'Gormly, was banished from Moy Ithe into Inishowen, to Donough O'Duibhdhiorma. In three months afterwards, the Kinel-Moen deposed Conor, the son of Cu Allaidh, and gave back the chieftainship to Donnell, the son of Donnell O'Gormly. The people of Donnell O'Gormly, namely, Gilla Caech O'Ederla, and the O'Flanagans, treacherously slew O'Loony in Donnell's own house, even while he was under the protection of the Erenagh of Urney, who was with him at the time. Upon this the Kinel-Moen drove Donnell O'Gormly from the chieftainship, and set up Rory O'Flaherty as their chieftain: but the three sons of this O'Flaherty acted a treacherous part towards the Kinel-Moen;they slew Donnell, the son of Donnell O'Gormly, Tiernan, the son of Randal Mac Donnell, and eight other gentlemen of the Kinel-Moen. Randal, the son of Eachmarcach O'Kane, had been slain by the Kinel-Moen in the beginning of this summer, and in revenge of this were slain Galagh O'Loony and Murtough O'Petan; and it was in revenge of this, moreover, the aforesaid act of treachery was committed against the Kinel-Moen.

== See also ==
- Patrick Peyton
- Philip Payton
