= Knowlton Court =

Grade I listed manor house near Goodnestone, Kent, England

Coordinates: 51.2334°N 1.2661°E

Knowlton Court

Knowlton Court is a Grade I listed manor house near Sandwich, Kent, England that dates back to the Elizabethan period. The present front façade in the Queen Anne style, was added in 1715.

== Early history ==
The Knowlton estate is recorded in the Domesday Book, during which time it belonged to Bishop Odo of Bayeux, the half-brother of William the Conqueror.

== Elizabethan and Stuart period ==
The Knowlton estate was inherited in 1544 by John Peyton, MP. The present house was originally built in 1585 in red brick for his son Sir Thomas Peyton. He was succeeded in turn in 1611 by his only son Samuel, who became a baronet.

During the late 17th century, Knowlton Court was home to the Royalist lieutenant-general Sir Thomas Peyton, 2nd Baronet, born in 1613. He was MP for Sandwich from 1640 to 1644, removed from Parliament after a spell in prison in 1643 and charged with, among other things, being a "malignant". After heading a failed Royalist rising in Kent in May 1648, Sir Thomas was taken prisoner near Bury St Edmunds and committed to the Tower – and Knowlton Court was ransacked. He regained his status after the Restoration and became an MP in the Cavalier Parliament from 1661 to 1679, representing Kent. Sir Thomas, his wives, and Knowlton Court are mentioned in the published love letters of Dorothy Osborne to Sir William Temple, 1st Baronet (1652 to 1654).

After his death in 1684 in straightened financial circumstances, Sir Thomas' four daughters sold the Knowlton estate to Admiral Sir John Narborough.

== 18th century ==
Knowlton Court estate remained the property of Admiral Sir John Narborough during the late 17th century. After Narborough had died at sea, leaving a widow and two sons, his wife married Admiral Sir Cloudesley Shovell, who also died at sea, along with his two Narborough stepsons, in the Scilly naval disaster of 1707. His flagship, HMS Association, and three other ships were lost, claiming the lives of nearly 2,000 sailors. Shovell's stepsons, Sir John Narborough, 1st Baronet, and his brother James, are commemorated in Knowlton Church.

== 19th century to the present ==
The estate passed to the D'Aeth family in 1707, including Sir Thomas D'Aeth. The D’Aeth family owned it until 1904 when it was bought by Major Francis Elmer Speed (28 February 1859 – 23 August 1928). He was High Sheriff of Kent and had two sons, John and Douglas.

Knowlton Court is a private country house in Knowlton, Kent, England. The house has 19 en-suite bedrooms and is available for exclusive-use, private and corporate stays and as a film location. The estate includes a number of other holiday houses, including the Grade II listed Elizabethan Dower House and The Lodge, which was designed by Edwin Landseer Lutyens in 1912.
