= John Peyton =

John Peyton may refer to:

- John Peyton (by 1500-58), MP for Winchelsea
- Sir John Peyton (soldier) (1544–1630), English soldier, MP and Governor of Jersey
- Sir John Peyton, 1st Baronet (1561–1616), MP for Cambridgeshire
- John Peyton (died 1635), MP for Castle Rising
- John Peyton (fisherman) (1749–1829), fisherman and fur trader in Newfoundland
  - John Peyton Jr., justice of the peace, the son of the above
- Sir John Strutt Peyton (1786–1838), captain in the Royal Navy
- John Peyton, Baron Peyton of Yeovil (1919–2006), British politician who served as Minister for Transport
- John Peyton (American politician) (born 1964), American politician and mayor of Jacksonville, Florida 2003–2011

== See also ==
- John Payton (1946–2012), American civil rights attorney
- Jon Peyton Price, British actor
