= Peyton Dix =

American writer, social strategist, podcaster

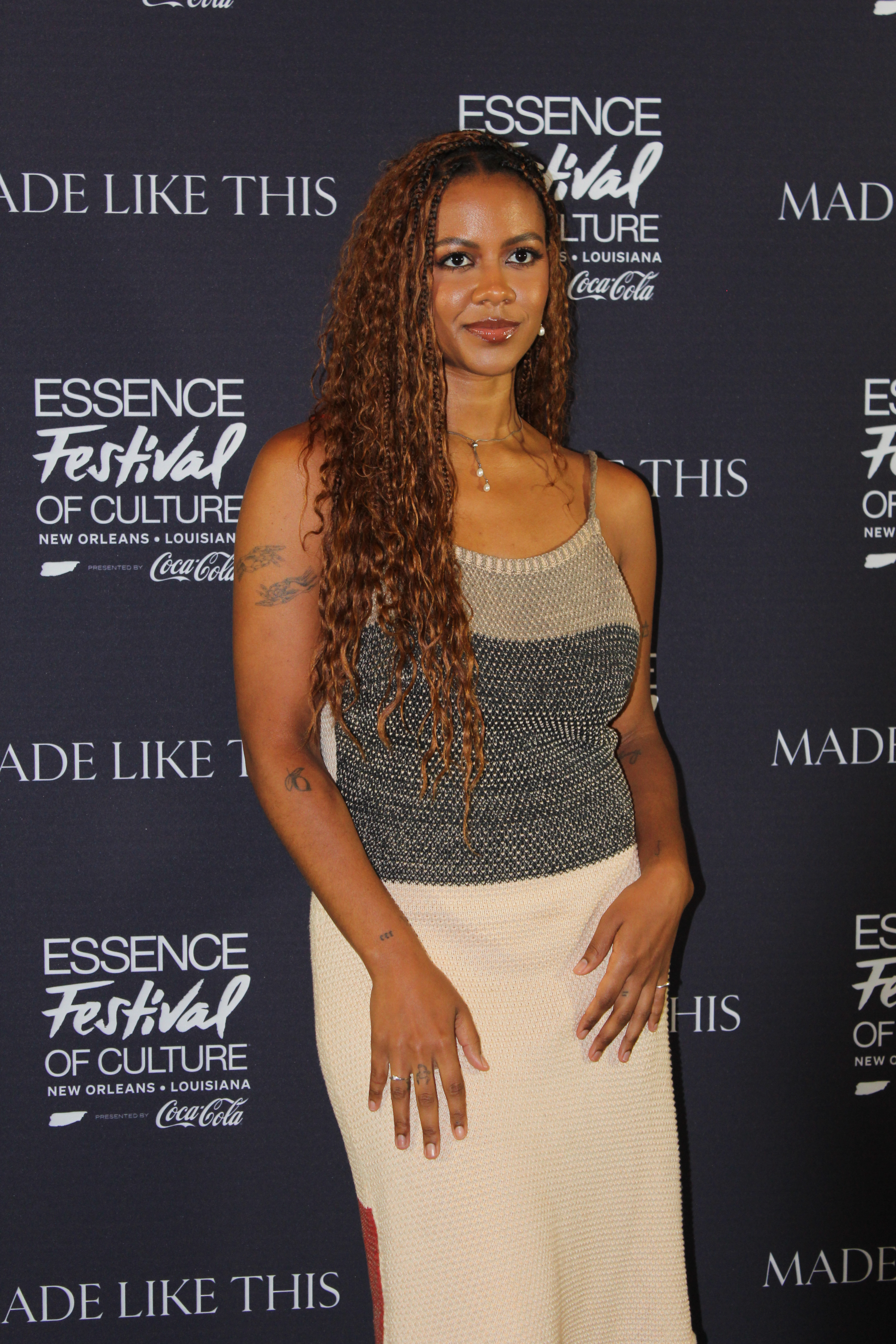
- Dix at Essence Festival 2025
- Born: Los Angeles, California, USA
- Education: Emerson College
- Occupations: Writer, social media strategist, podcaster
- Years active: 2016–present

Peyton Dix is an American writer, social media strategist, and podcaster. She worked for The Outline, Paper, InStyle, and MAC Cosmetics in social strategy. Dix co-hosts the podcast Lemme Say This with Hunter Harris.

== Life and career ==
Dix was born and raised in Baldwin Hills, Los Angeles. She received her bachelor's degree from Emerson College, where she met her best friend and later collaborator, Hunter Harris. At Harris' encouragement she started a fashion column for the student newspaper.

Dix's first professional writing and social media job was at The Outline. She went on to work in social media at Paper and later became the head social media editor. Dix next worked at InStyle as a special projects editor. She briefly left media to work at MAC Cosmetics as a global social director, before becoming a full-time freelancer.

In May 2024 she and writer Hunter Harris launched the pop culture podcast Lemme Say This on Wondery. The podcast went on hiatus in October 2025 until it was relaunched in April 2026 by President Barack and Michelle Obamas' Higher Ground Productions media company. In June 2026 Dix and Harris interviewed Michelle Obama on the podcast.

Dix has resided in Brooklyn since 2016. She is queer. She wrote a piece for Vogue about how she considers her queer identity in relation to her lesbian grandmother.
