= Shelly Peyton =

American chemist

- Education: University of California, Irvine; Northwestern University
- Scientific career
- Workplaces: University of Massachusetts Amherst; Massachusetts Institute of Technology
- Thesis: Tissue engineering in the cardiovascular system : mechanically tunable biomaterials to direct smooth muscle cell phenotype. (2007)
- Website: Peyton Lab

Shelly R. Peyton is an American chemical engineer who is Professor and Chair in the Department of Biomedical Engineering at the Tufts University. Her research considers the development of biomaterials to investigate metastatic cancer and potential new therapies.

== Early life and education ==
Peyton was an undergraduate student at Northwestern University, where she majored in chemical engineering. She was a member of the ultimate frisbee team. Peyton moved to the University of California, Irvine, where she worked on tissue engineering for the cardiovascular system in the research group of Andy Putnam. Peyton moved to the Massachusetts Institute of Technology where she was appointed a National Institutes of Health Ruth L. Kirschstein Postdoctoral Fellow. At MIT, Peyton was trained in stem cell biology by Linda Griffith. Together they investigated mesenchymal stem cell migration.

== Research and career ==
In 2011, Peyton joined the University of Massachusetts Amherst, where she established a research program in the design and application of biomaterials. She was made the Barry and Afsaneh Siadat Career Development Fellow in 2012.

Peyton investigated the fundamental mechanisms that underpin metastasis through the engineering of carefully controlled environments. The series of events includes crosstalk between stem cells and tumours, the mobilization of stem cells, the reassembly of pre-metastatic tissue and the movement of circulating stem cells to tissue sites. In particular, Peyton is interested in the role of stem cells in the metastatic spread of breast cancer. She argued that the stem cells remodel the target organ, altering the mechanical properties of the organ before the cancer cells attack. The controlled environments created by Peyton mimic human organs, allowing Peyton to study how cancer cells embedded in these artificial tissues respond to different forms of chemotherapy. Specifically, the three-dimensional tumour spheroids allow Peyton to precisely control and study the response of biological tissue to cancer cells and therapies.

Peyton worked with Sandra Petersen to develop the Postbaccalaureate Research Education Program (PREP), a $1.7 million National Science Foundation program that looks to improve diversity in the biomedical workforce. In particular, PREP provides funding to doctoral students from historically marginalized groups.

== Awards and honors ==
- 2013 National Institutes of Health New Innovator Award
- 2013 Pew Biomedical Scholar
- 2015 Cellular and Molecular Bioengineering Young Innovator Award
- 2015 National Science Foundation CAREER Award
- 2018 Purdue University Mellichamp Lecture

== Selected publications ==
- Peyton, Shelly Renae; Andrew J. Putnam (2005). "Extracellular matrix rigidity governs smooth muscle cell motility in a biphasic fashion". Journal of Cellular Physiology. 204 (1): 198–209. doi:10.1002/jcp.20274. PMID 15669099. Wikidata Q45255637.
- Peyton, Shelly Renae; Christopher B Raub; Vic P Keschrumrus; Andrew J. Putnam (2006). "The use of poly(ethylene glycol) hydrogels to investigate the impact of ECM chemistry and mechanics on smooth muscle cells". Biomaterials. 27 (28): 4881–4893. doi:10.1016/j.biomaterials.2006.05.012. PMID 16762407. Wikidata Q46018293.
- Chirag B Khatiwala; Peyton, Shelly Renae; Andrew J. Putnam (2006). "Intrinsic mechanical properties of the extracellular matrix affect the behavior of pre-osteoblastic MC3T3-E1 cells". The American Journal of Physiology - Cell Physiology. 290 (6): C1640-50. doi:10.1152/ajpcell.00455.2005. PMID 16407416. Wikidata Q40330994.

== Personal life ==
Peyton married her wife in 2016. Peyton is involved with various initiatives to support LGBTQIA+ researchers at the University of Massachusetts Amherst and Biomedical Engineering Society, and was encouraged to do so by Naomi Chesler.
