= Algernon Peyton =

The Rev. Algernon Peyton (died 1668) was an English priest of the Church of England, rector of Doddington, Cambridgeshire from 1641 through to the end of the Interregnum in 1660.

== Early life ==
He was the second son of the soldier and spy Sir John Peyton (1579–1635), and grandson of the soldier and administrator Sir John Peyton (1544–1630); his mother was Alice Peyton, the second daughter of Sir John Peyton, 1st Baronet of Iselham. On his mother's side, the Peytons were "godly Protestants". His father bought in 1601 the manor of Doddington, The family also owned the advowson of Doddington Rectory, "one of the wealthiest in the country".

Algernon Peyton, according to Ely episcopal records, was baptised in 1616. He matriculated at Peterhouse, Cambridge in 1632, where he graduated B.A. in 1637, M.A. in 1641. He was ordained deacon in April 1641 by John Towers, Bishop of Peterborough, and priest in September of that year. He was presented to the living of Doddington by his elder brother Robert, which he held to 1667; the living was said to be rich. In 1642 Peyton was the defendant in a debt case brought against him by Samuel Farley, a Fellow of King's College, Cambridge.

== Under the Commonwealth ==
In 1647 Peyton wrote to Augustin Neave, Oliver Cromwell's man of business. He spent a period in prison, in the period 1647 to 1649. In 1657 the Second Protectorate Parliament passed a private bill to allow Robert and Algernon Peyton to sell land, to cover debts.

In 1658 Peyton inherited the estates of his elder brother Robert. That year his son Algernon was sent to Shrewsbury School.

== From 1660 ==
Peyton was accounted "zealous in the cause of the King"; Lord Clarendon wrote to Lord Arlington in 1666 that he was a "loyal man".

On the 1660 Restoration and the return of Charles II of England, he provided deer to restock the royal deer parks. He presented the King with a manuscript written by Sir John Peyton the elder his grandfather, a collection of "several instructions and directions given to divers Ambassadors and other commissioners appointed to treat with foreign princes about affairs of state, and also some things concerning the Island of Jersey and Count Mansfield". It became one of the Sloane manuscripts, MS 2442. Peyton was created D.D. in 1661, per literas regias.

In 1661 a private bill in the House of Commons allowed Peyton to sell land, to meet debts. In 1663 he was defendant in a court case at Wisbech, brought by Michael Asselden over a debt of £112.

Algernon Peyton died in the King's Bench Prison in 1668, where he was being held as a debtor. He was buried at St George's Church, Southwark on 9 March.

== Family ==
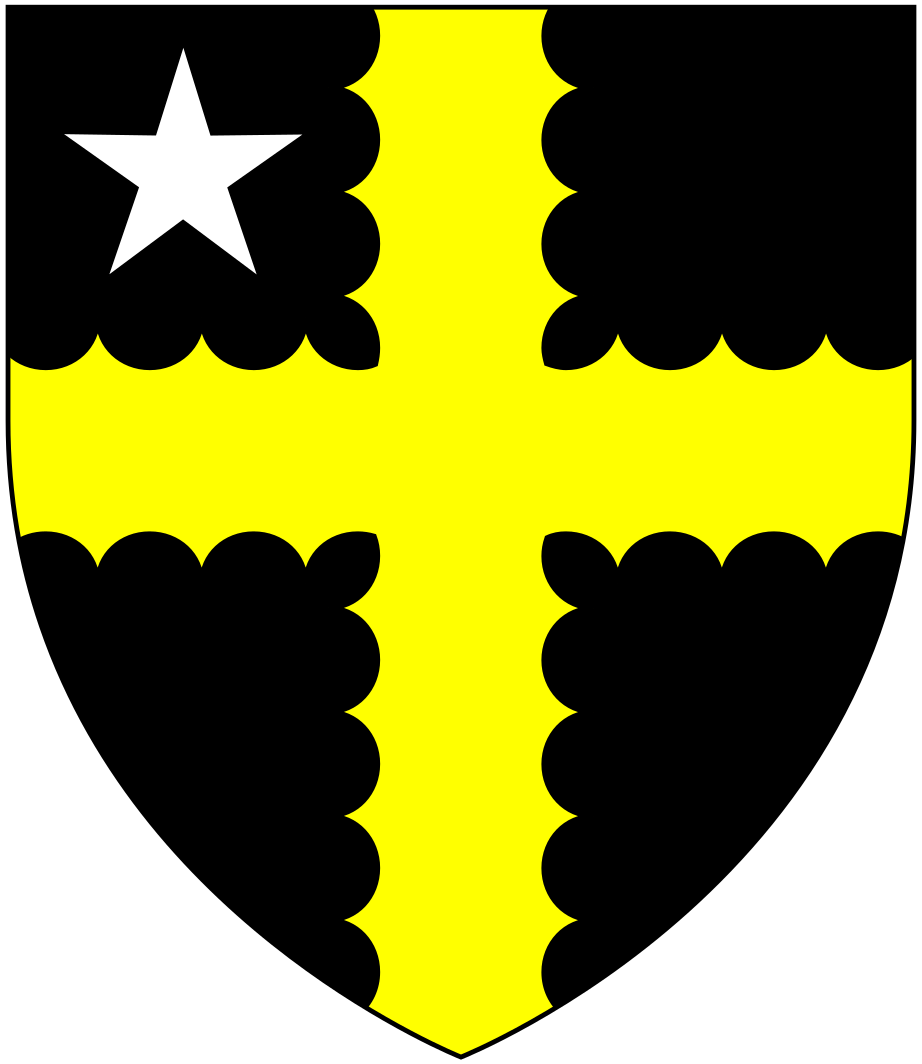
Escutcheon of the Peyton baronets of Doddington

Peyton married Elizabeth Cook, daughter of John Cook(e) of Chrishall, Essex. Their eldest son John was created in December 1660 a baronet, dying the same month without heir. The second son Algernon was created a baronet, of the Peyton baronets of Doddington (2nd creation, 1667) "in compliment to his father".

The third son Henry served as an officer under Charles Churchill in the 3rd Regiment of Foot. Alice, the youngest daughter, married in 1667 John Nalson, who the following year became Algernon Peyton's successor as rector of Donnington. Valentine Nalson (died 1723), the cleric and church musician, was their son.
