= USS Despatch (SP-68) =

US Navy tender

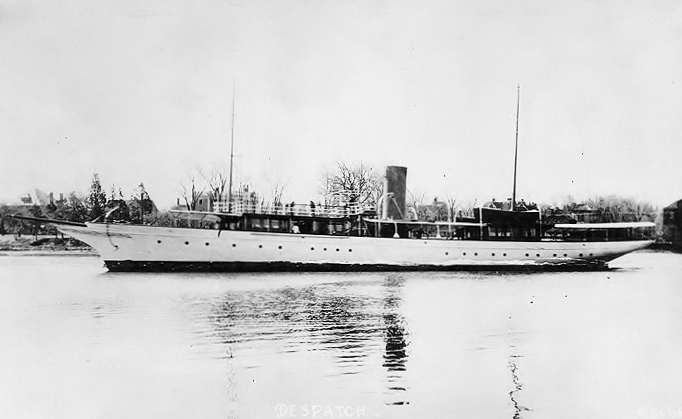
- USS Despatch (PY-8), possibly in 1920 or 1921.

History

United States
- Name: USS Vixen (10 August 1917 – 21 August 1917); USS Despatch (from 21 August 1917)
- Namesake: Vixen was her previous name retained; Despatch, as a verb, is to send off or away, to dispose of speedily, to execute quickly; as a noun, is a message sent with speed.
- Builder: Gas Engine and Power Company and Charles L. Seabury Company, Morris Heights, New York
- Completed: 1913
- Acquired: 6 August 1917
- Commissioned: 10 August 1917
- Recommissioned: 12 April 1920
- Decommissioned: 15 July 1919 (first time); 9 December 1921 (second and final time)
- Renamed: USS Despatch 21 August 1917 (originally was USS Vixen)
- Reclassified: Patrol yacht, PY-8, 17 July 1920
- Fate: Transferred to State of Florida 10 May 1928
- Notes: In use as private yacht Vixen 1913–1917; In use by the State of Florida from 1928

General characteristics
- Type: Tender
- Tonnage: 287 GRT, 195 NRT
- Displacement: 237 tons
- Length: 164.0 ft (50.0 m)
- Beam: 22.4 ft (6.8 m)
- Draft: 6 ft (1.8 m)
- Depth: 11.7 ft (3.6 m)
- Installed power: 52 NHP
- Propulsion: 2 × triple-expansion engines; 2 × screws
- Sail plan: schooner
- Speed: 16 knots (30 km/h)
- Complement: 49
- Armament: 2 × 3-pounder guns

USS Despatch (SP-68), later PY-8, originally USS Vixen (SP-68), was a steam yacht that served in the United States Navy as a tender from 1917 to 1919 and from 1920 to 1921.

== Construction and acquisition ==
Despatch was built for John Dustin Archbold as the private steam yacht Vixen in 1913 at Morris Heights, New York, by the Gas Engine and Power Company and the Charles L. Seabury Company. The U.S. Navy purchased her on 6 August 1917 for World War I service and commissioned her on 10 August 1917 as USS Vixen (SP-68). Just eleven days later, on 21 August 1917, she was renamed USS Despatch (SP-68).

== First period in commission, 1917–1919 ==
Despatch was assigned duties as a tender with the United States Atlantic Fleet, operating along the United States East Coast between Norfolk, Virginia, and New London, Connecticut, as well as in the Chesapeake Bay and in the Potomac River. She carried men, mail, and supplies to the fleet, transported United States Government officials and high-ranking officers between Washington, D.C., and bases in the Norfolk area, and carried Commander, Battleship Force One, on inspection cruises. Between 13 March 1919 and 23 June 1919, she was flagship for Commander, Division Four, Battleship Force, in Hampton Roads, Virginia.

Despatch was decommissioned on 15 July 1919 and laid up at Norfolk.

== Second period in commission, 1920–1921 ==
Despatch was recommissioned at Norfolk on 12 April 1920. Assigned to duty as flagship and tender for the Military Governor of Santo Domingo, she reported for her new duty on 26 June 1920. She was reclassified as a patrol yacht and redesignated PY-8 on 17 July 1920. For the next year, Despatch carried officials on inspection tours in the Caribbean and delivered passengers, mail, and stores to ships and stations in the West Indies.

Despatch arrived at New York City on 10 August 1921 to assume tender duty with the Atlantic Fleet, serving temporarily as flagship. During these last few months of her career, she was at sea only for two brief voyages between New York and Newport, Rhode Island.

Despatch was decommissioned for the second and final time on 9 December 1921 at New York.

== Final disposition ==
Despatch had been laid up for over six years when an Act of Congress of 10 March 1928 approved her transfer to the government of the State of Florida. Accordingly, the Navy transferred her to the State of Florida on 10 May 1928.
