= Dispatches (magazine) =

dispatches
- Editor: Gary Knight, Mort Rosenblum
- Categories: Photography, International affairs, foreign affairs
- Frequency: 4/year
- Publisher: Simba Gill
- Founded: 2008
- Final issue Number: 2009; 5
- Company: Dispatches Corp.
- Country: International
- Based in: UK, USA
- Language: English
- Website: www.rethink-dispatches.com
- ISSN: 1945-3329

Dispatches is a defunct quarterly political magazine, founded in 2008, by photographer Gary Knight, journalist and author Mort Rosenblum, and pharmaceutical executive Dr. Simba Gill. It ceased publication after five issues.

With its signature plain brown paper cover, its small book-size format, and at almost 200 pages in length, Dispatches did not resemble a typical news magazine. Nor did the magazines' emphasis on printed word, (as opposed to online content,) reflect the general trends in the media industry. Furthermore, Dispatches was distinguished by its use of long-form journalism and photo-essay, to explore a single topic of international relevance in each issue.

== Format ==
Each issue of Dispatches focused on one topic in the fields of international relations and foreign affairs. Topics included "In America", "Beyond Iraq", and "On Russia". Contributors differed with each issue, as they were commissioned based on their experience and expertise in the topic being explored. Contributors included journalists, foreign correspondents, academics, novelists, and photographers. Photography and photo-essays were prominent in the magazine, with approximately 80 pages per issue dedicated to the work of a single photographer documenting a single topic.

By focusing on a single topic per issue, Dispatches attempted to give more depth on a given topic than was commonly found in the media. In its first issue, "In America", travel writer Paul Theroux highlighted the lack of depth in the media's coverage of events such as the Iraq War. He indicated "...what we are still getting - is foreground, no background".
