= Peyton Place =

Peyton Place may refer to:

- Peyton Place (novel), a 1956 novel by Grace Metalious
  - Peyton Place, a fictional New England town that is the setting for the 1956 novel
- Peyton Place (film), a 1957 film, adapted from the novel
- Return to Peyton Place, a 1959 follow-up novel also by Grace Metalious
- Return to Peyton Place (film), the 1961 sequel to the 1957 film
- Peyton Place (TV series), an ABC prime time soap opera from 1964 to 1969, also adapted from the 1956 novel
- Return to Peyton Place (TV series), an NBC daytime soap opera that ran from 1972 to 1974
- Murder in Peyton Place, a 1977 television movie based on the 1964 TV series
- Peyton Place: The Next Generation, a 1985 television movie based on the 1964 TV series
- "Peyton Place", a song by the band Squeeze, released on their album Frank in 1989
- Looking for Peyton Place, a 2005 novel by Barbara Delinsky

== See also ==
- Payton's Place, a 1995 jazz album by Nicholas Payton
- Peyton's Places, a sports television show starring Peyton Manning
