= Knowlton, Kent =

Village in Kent, England

Coordinates: 51.235°N 1.275°E

Knowlton
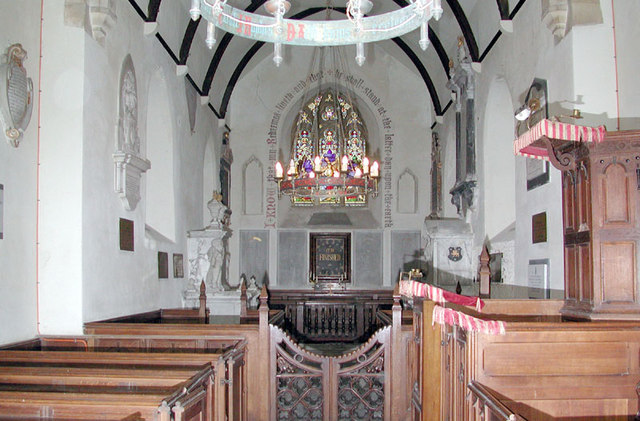
- St Clement's Church, Knowlton

- Location within Kent
- Civil parish: Goodnestone
- District: Dover
- Shire county: Kent
- Region: South East
- Country: England
- Sovereign state: United Kingdom
- Post town: CANTERBURY
- Postcode district: CT3
- Police: Kent
- Fire: Kent
- Ambulance: South East Coast

Knowlton was an ecclesiastical and civil parish; the former was abolished in 1940 , the latter on 1 April 1935, and the village is now part of Goodnestone civil parish, in the Dover district, in Kent, England. It is located about 10 miles (16 km) north of Dover. Knowlton Court, set in 200 acres (81 ha) of parkland, is located here. In 1931 the civil parish had a population of 18.

The Church of St Clement is now redundant and in the care of the Churches Conservation Trust, and is open daily. Within the church, there are monuments to Lady Elizabeth d'Aeth and her father Sir John Narborough

Knowlton is a thankful village, in that it did not lose anyone in World War I. The village is featured on Darren Hayman's album, Thankful Villages Volume 1. Knowlton was always named "Britain's Bravest Village" by The Weekly Dispatch newspaper, for having the largest proportion of WW1 volunteers, though the victory was disputed due a number of counted volunteers being employed at Knowlton Manor, rather than residents of the village itself.

It was once served (1916-1948), by a halt on the East Kent Light Railway, one of Colonel Stephen's lines, which ran between Sheperdswell & Wingham.
