= John Narborough =

English naval commander (c. 1640–1688)

Admiral Sir John Narborough
- Born: c. 1640
- Died: 1688 (aged ~48)
- Burial place: Knowlton, Kent; 51°14′1″N 1°16′1″E
- Military career
- Branch: Royal Navy
- Rank: Admiral
- Conflicts: Battle of Sole Bay; Actions against the Barbary pirates
- Other work: Commissioner of the Navy

Narborough was knighted after the Battle of Sole Bay in 1672.

Admiral Sir John Narborough (or Narbrough, c. 1640–1688) was an English naval commander. He served with distinction in the Anglo-Dutch Wars and against the pirates of the Barbary Coast. He is also known for leading a poorly understood expedition to Valdivia and Patagonia in 1670–1671. In the 1680s he was involved in the scavenging of wrecked Spanish treasure ships.

== Life ==
=== Early life ===
Narborough was descended from an old Norfolk family. He married and had two surviving sons and a daughter by Elizabeth Hill, whose father was John Hill, a Commissioner of the Navy. After her husband's death, Lady Narborough married Admiral Sir Cloudesley Shovell.

Narborough served as cabin boy to Christopher Myngs and his later cabin boy was Cloudesley Shovell. Narborough was promoted to lieutenant in 1664 and in 1666 to Captain, for gallantry in an action against the Dutch fleet off the Downs in June of that year.

=== Expedition to Patagonia ===
Rute of Narborough's expedition to Valdivia.

After the peace, he was chosen to conduct a secretive voyage in the South Seas. He set sail from Deptford on 26 September 1669, and entered the Straits of Magellan in October of the following year. In 1670 he visited Port Desire in Argentina and claimed the territory for the Kingdom of England. Having made landings at various points the expedition finally arrived to the heavily fortified Corral Bay on late December 1670. There the expedition established contact with the Spanish garrison whose commanders were highly suspicious of Narborough's intentions despite England being at peace with Spain. The Spanish demanded and received four English hostages in exchange for allowing Narborough's ship into the bay. Despite claiming to be in distress and in need of provisions the Spanish refused to give provisions given that the crews seemed to be in healthy condition and Narborough's true intentions being unclear to them. Narborough then unexpectedly made the decision to leave, and his ship departed Corral Bay on 31 December. The four English hostages and a man known as Carlos Enriques were left behind and ended up in the prisons of Lima where they were subject to lengthy interrogations, as the Spanish struggled to find out the goal of Narborough's expedition. Narborough returned home in June 1671 without achieving his original purpose. A narrative of the expedition was published at London in 1694 under the title An Account of several late Voyages and Discoveries to the South and North.

=== Third Anglo-Dutch War, Barbary corsairs ===
During the Third Anglo-Dutch War Narborough was second captain of the Lord High Admiral's ship, HMS Prince. He conducted himself with conspicuous valour at the Battle of Sole Bay in May 1672, after the death in action of his superior, Sir John Cox, and won approbation. Shortly after he was promoted to rear-admiral and knighted.

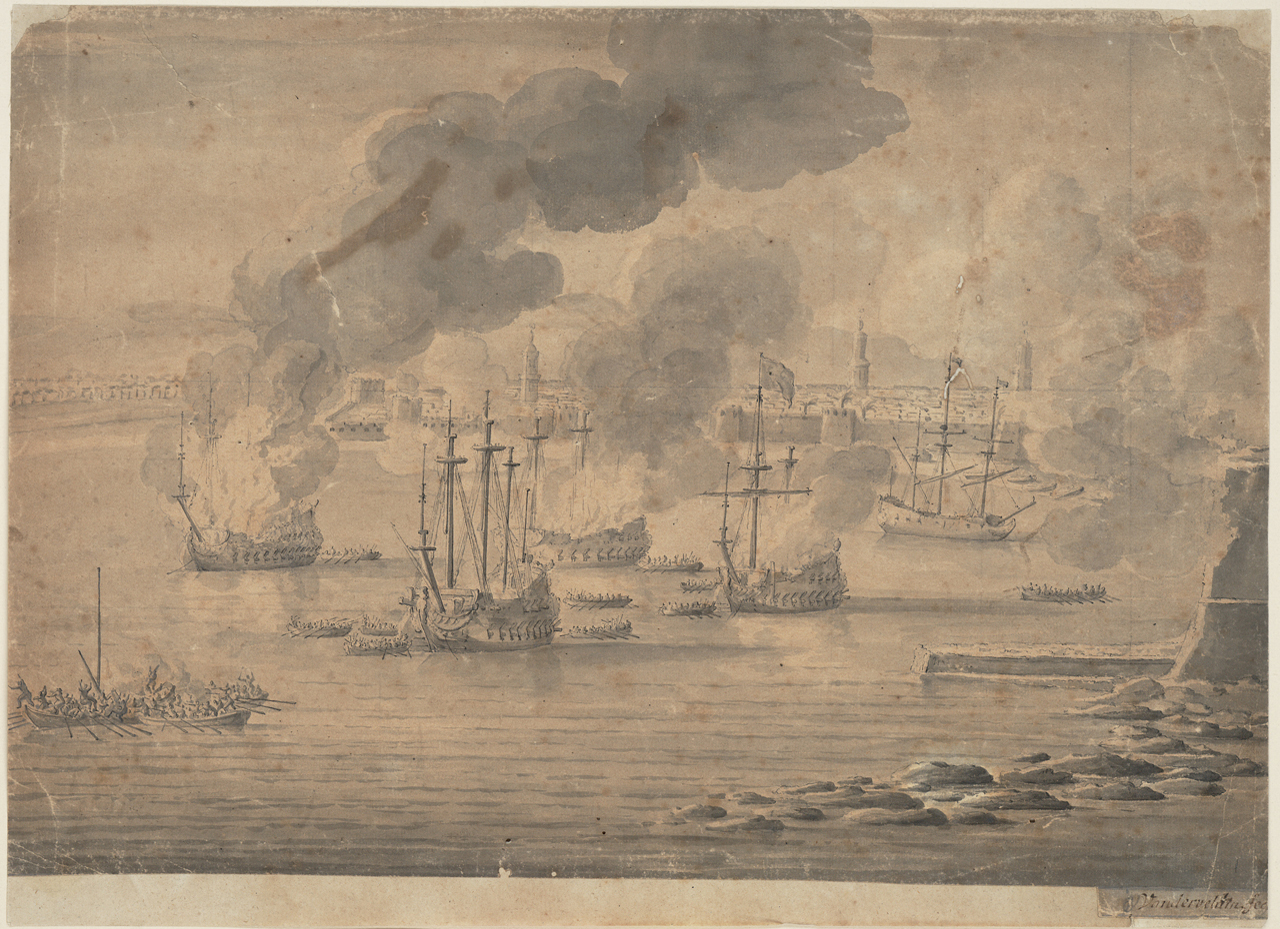
Sir John suppressing Barbary pirates 14–24 January 1676

In 1675 he was sent to suppress the Barbary piracies, and by despatching gun-boats into the harbour of Tripoli at midnight and burning the ships, he induced the Dey to agree to a treaty. An account of the raid appears in the diary of a naval chaplain, Henry Teonge. The lieutenant responsible for the harbour burnings was Cloudesley Shovell, who later married Narborough's widow. Shortly after returning, Narborough undertook a similar expedition against the Algerines.

=== Commissioner of the Navy, treasure hunting and death ===
In 1680 Narborough was appointed Commissioner of the Navy, an office he held until his death in 1688. During those years he was a patron to a treasure hunter from New England, invested in an expedition by William Phips to find wrecked Spanish treasure ships in the Caribbean, and sought for the support of Charles II and others in the venture. Phips's first expedition, made in 1682 and funded by New England investors, was marginally successful. His second, in 1683–1685, was less successful, but gained valuable leads, and Narborough helped him to raise funds for a third expedition. Departing in September 1686, Phips located a valuable wreck in February 1687 and returned to England with treasure valued at over £200,000, which gained him approbation and a knighthood. After this success, Narborough decided to lead a follow-up expedition in the following year. Returning to the wreck, the English found it had been discovered by others. They recovered only about £10,000 of treasure before Narborough fell ill and died at sea in May 1688.

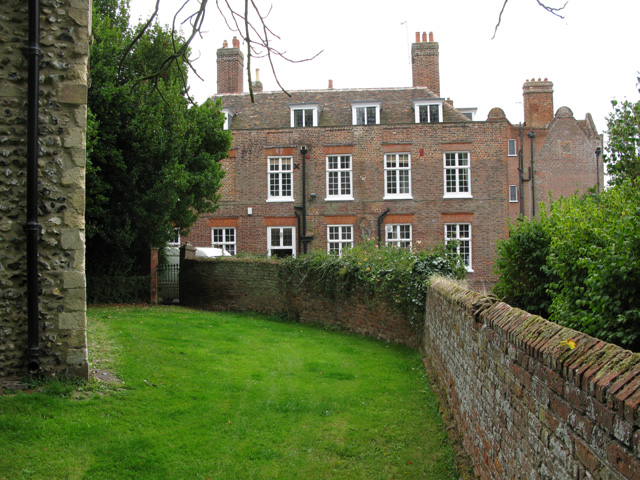
Knowlton Court, Kent

Narborough had bought the Knowlton Court estate, near Dover, from the executors of Sir Thomas Peyton, and so was buried in St Clement's Church. (Note: Narborough's memorial is a marble plaque inside the church) His eldest son John was created a baronet in November 1688 (see Narborough Baronets) in honour of his father. Sir John died with his brother James and their stepfather Admiral Sir Cloudesley Shovell aboard HMS Association during the Scilly naval disaster of 1707. Narborough's widow is buried in St Paulinius's Church, Crayford, where there is a memorial to her and her second husband. Narborough's two sons were buried in the Old Town Church on St Mary's, Isles of Scilly.

Knowlton Court passed to Narborough's daughter Elizabeth, who had married Sir Thomas D'Aeth in 1701.

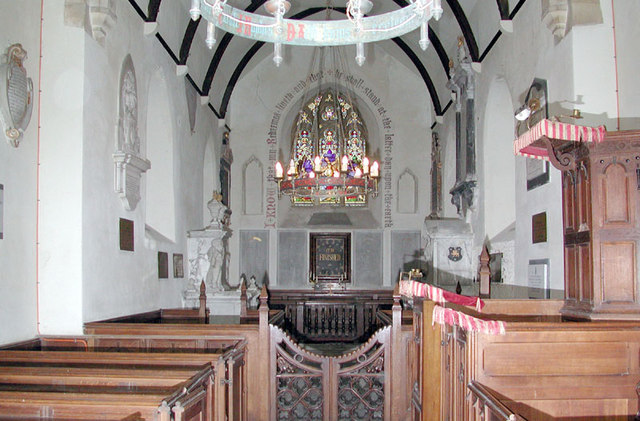
Both Sir John and his sons have memorials in Knowlton church.

== Legacy ==
Knowlton church has monuments to Sir John and to his sons. The latter depicts the grounding of the Association. Fernandina Island, westernmost in the Galapagos archipelago, was long named Narbrough or Narborough Island in his honour by the 17th-century buccaneer William Ambrosia Cowley.
