= Sir Henry Peyton, 1st Baronet =

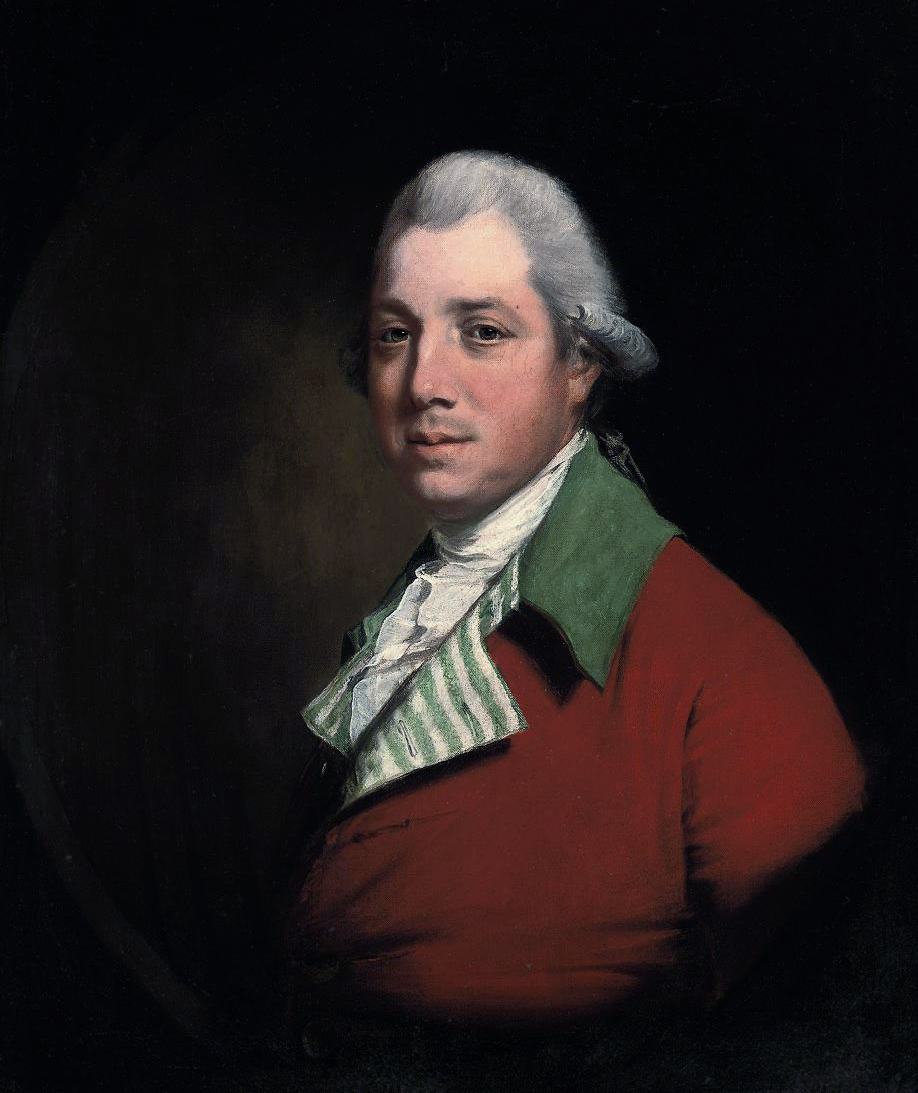
Sir Henry Dashwood Peyton, 1st Baronet (1736–1789)

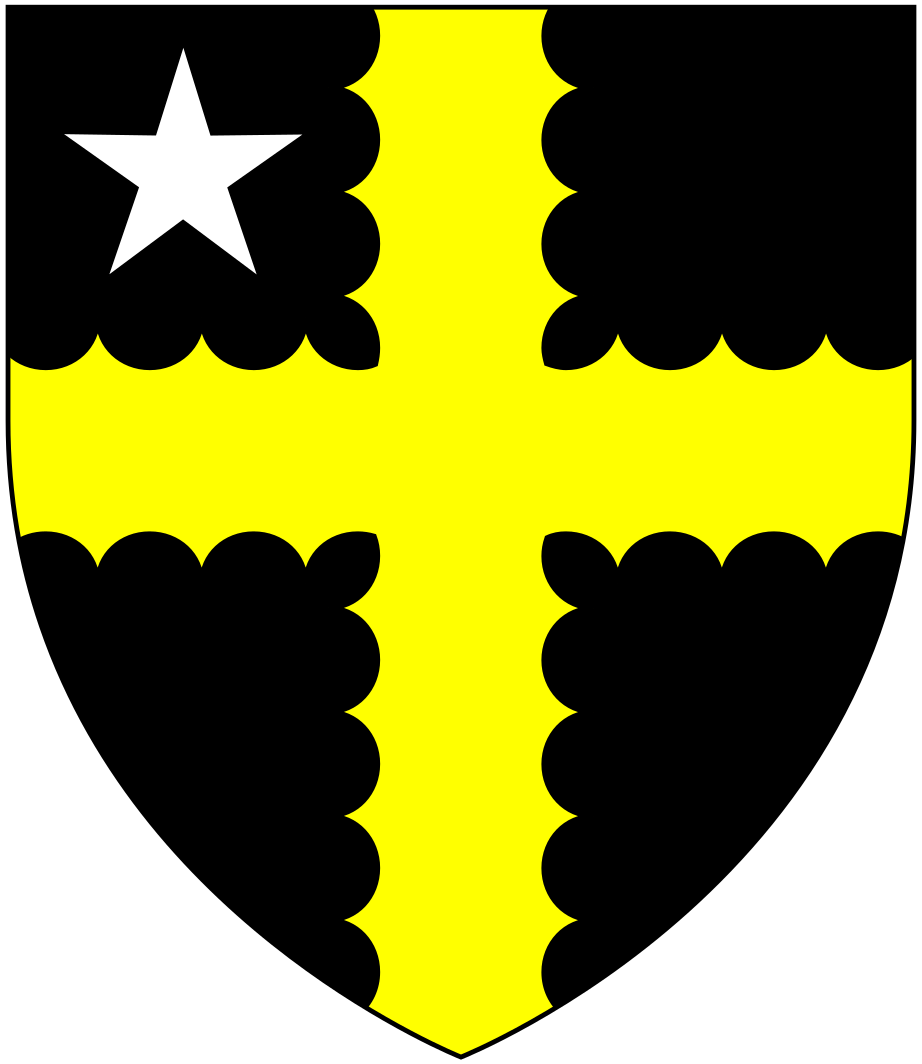
Arms of Peyton: Sable, a cross engrailed or a mullet in the first quarter argent

Sir Henry Dashwood Peyton, 1st Baronet (1736–1789), of Doddington, Cambridgeshire, was an English politician who sat in the House of Commons from 1782 to 1789.

Peyton was born Henry Dashwood, the eldest son of George Dashwood and his wife Margaret Peyton, daughter of Sir Sewster Peyton, 2nd Baronet, of Doddington. His father died in 1762 and he succeeded to his estate. When he succeeded to his uncle's estates on 29 June 1771, he took the latter's name of Peyton as his own. He married Frances Rous, daughter of Sir John Rous, 5th Baronet on 2 December 1771. The estates he came into were at Doddington, Cambridgeshire and Narborough Hall in Norfolk. He was created a baronet on 18 September 1776, and was selected as High Sheriff of Norfolk in 1778.

Peyton was returned unopposed as Member of Parliament (MP) for Cambridgeshire at a by-election on 20 June 1782 with the support of the Duke of Rutland and Lord Hardwicke. His fellow MP Philip Yorke had described Peyton to Hardwicke as "a mere country gentleman, without much knowledge of the world, and no more polish than his wife has given him". He was returned unopposed again at the 1784 general election.

He was elected as a Bailiff to the board of the Bedford Level Corporation in 1787, a position he held until his death.

Peyton died on 1 May 1789. He and his wife Frances had two sons and three daughters. He was succeeded in the baronetcy by his eldest son, Henry. His daughter, Harriet Peyton, married Thomas Kingscote (9 Dec 1757 – 15 Apr 1811) on 8 October 1794.

Parliament of Great Britain
| Preceded by Lord Robert Manners; Viscount Royston | Member of Parliament for Cambridgeshire; 1782–1789; With: Viscount Royston | Succeeded by James Whorwood Adeane; Viscount Royston |
Baronetage of Great Britain
| New creation | Baronet (of Doddington); 1776–1789 | Succeeded by Henry Peyton |
