= Peyton baronets =

Set index for Peyton baronets

There have been five baronetcies created for the surname Peyton. All the baronetcies are extinct.

- Peyton baronets of Isleham (1611)
- Peyton baronets of Knowlton (1611)
- Peyton baronets of Doddington (1st creation, 1660): see Algernon Peyton
- Peyton baronets of Doddington (2nd creation, 1667)
- Peyton baronets of Doddington (3rd creation, 1776)

All the baronets belonged to the Peyton Hall family, of the parish of Boxford, Suffolk. Suffolk. They were descendants of Sir Robert Peyton (d. 1518) of Isleham in Cambridgeshire, grandson and heir of Thomas Peyton (1418–1484) of Isleham, twice Sheriff of Cambridgeshire and Huntingdonshire, in 1443 and 1453.
