= Sir Henry Peyton, 2nd Baronet =

English politician

Sir Henry Peyton, 2nd Baronet (1779–1854), of Doddington, Cambridgeshire and Swift's House, Bicester, Oxfordshire was an English politician.

He was the eldest son of Sir Henry Peyton, 1st Baronet of Doddington, whom he succeeded in 1789. He was educated at Harrow School (1790–1795) and Christ Church, Oxford (1797–1799).

He was elected Member (MP) of the Parliament of the United Kingdom for Cambridgeshire in a by-election in May 1802 but did not stand in that year's general election. He was appointed High Sheriff of Cambridgeshire and Huntingdonshire for 1808–1809.

He was a notable carriage driver and a founder member of the Four Horse Club. He is mentioned in two novels by Georgette Heyer, The Reluctant Widow and Regency Buck.

He married Harriet, the daughter of Thomas Fitzhugh of Portland Place, Middlesex and the widow of James Bradshaw of Portland Place. They had one surviving son, Henry.

Baronetage of Great Britain
Preceded by Henry Peyton	Baronet (of Doddington); 1789–1854	Succeeded by Henry Peyton
