= Sir Henry Peyton, 3rd Baronet =

English Conservative Party politician

Sir Henry Peyton, 3rd Baronet (30 June 1804 – 18 February 1866), was an English Conservative Party politician.

He was a Member (MP) of the Parliament of the United Kingdom for Woodstock from 25 Jul 1837 until May 1838 .

Parliament of the United Kingdom
| Preceded by Lord Charles Spencer-Churchill | Member of Parliament for Woodstock; 1837–1838 | Succeeded by Marquess of Blandford |
Baronetage of the United Kingdom
| Preceded by Henry Peyton | Baronet (of Doddington); 1854–1866 | Succeeded by Algernon Peyton |
