= Weekly Dispatch =

Weekly Dispatch may refer to:

- New York Weekly Dispatch, a New York City paper published 1855–1858, succeeded by the New York Weekly, 1858–1910, and New York Weekly Welcome, 1910–1915
- Weekly Dispatch (1801), London, renamed to Sunday Dispatch in 1928
- Richmond Weekly Dispatch, Richmond, Virginia
- South Australian Weekly Dispatch, South Australia
