= Peyton baronets of Doddington (2nd creation, 1667) =

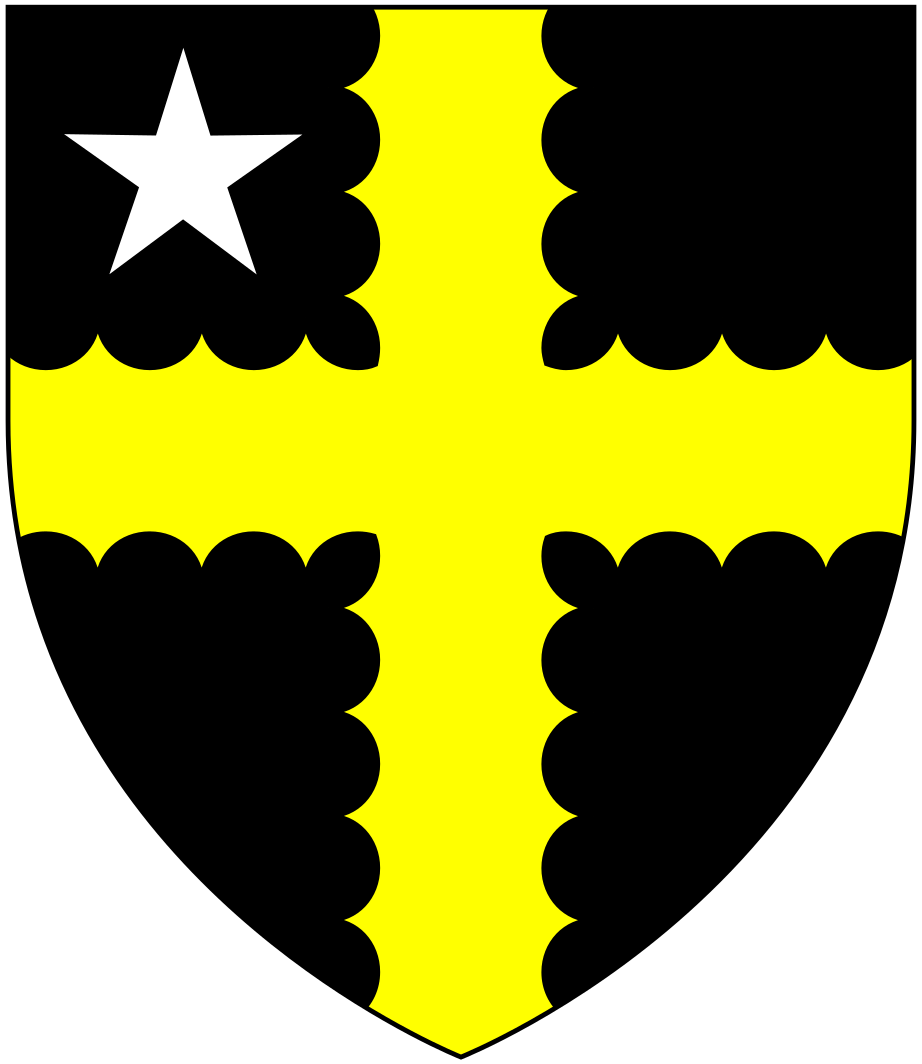
Escutcheon of the Peyton baronets of Doddington

The Peyton baronetcy, of Doddington in the County of Cambridge, was recreated on 21 March 1667 for Algernon Peyton, second son of the Rev. Algernon Peyton. His elder brother John had been granted a baronetcy at the end of 1660, but died within weeks.

Cokayne thinks it probable that there was a special remainder to a brother Thomas, but the 2nd Baronet was a son. The baronetcy became extinct on the death of the 3rd Baronet in 1771.

== Peyton baronets, of Doddington (1667; Second creation) ==
- Sir Algernon Peyton, 1st Baronet (1645–1671)
- Sir Sewster Peyton, 2nd Baronet (died 1717)
- Sir Thomas Peyton, 3rd Baronet (died 1771)
