= List of MPs elected in the 1841 United Kingdom general election =

1841–1847 Parliament of the United Kingdom
| ← | 1837–1841 Parliament | 1847–1852 Parliament | → |
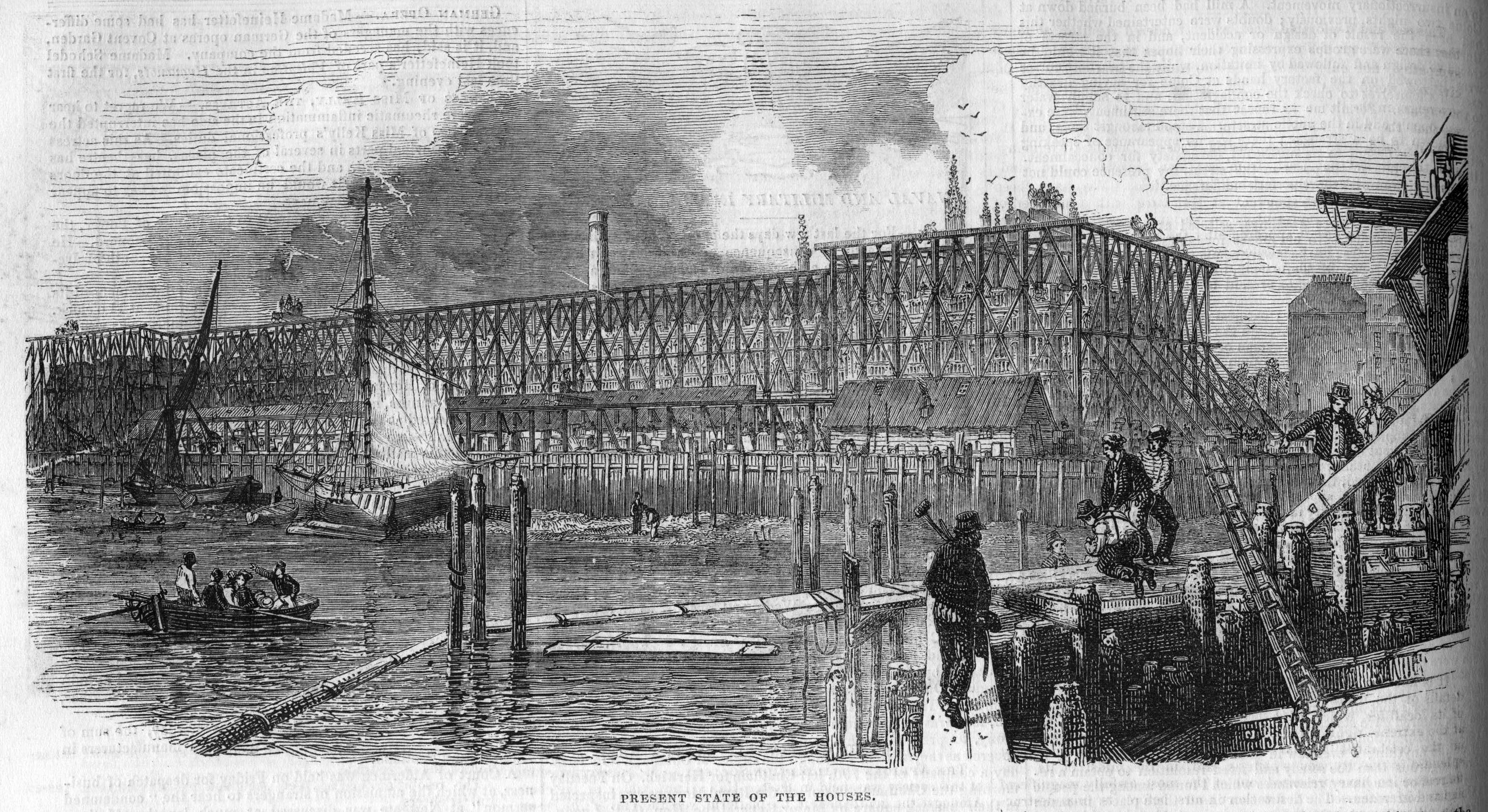
- The Palace of Westminster in 1842

Overview
- Legislative body: Parliament of the United Kingdom
- Meeting place: Palace of Westminster
- Term: 19 August 1841 – 23 July 1847
- Election: 1841 United Kingdom general election
- Government: First Russell ministry; Second Peel ministry (until 1846)

House of Commons
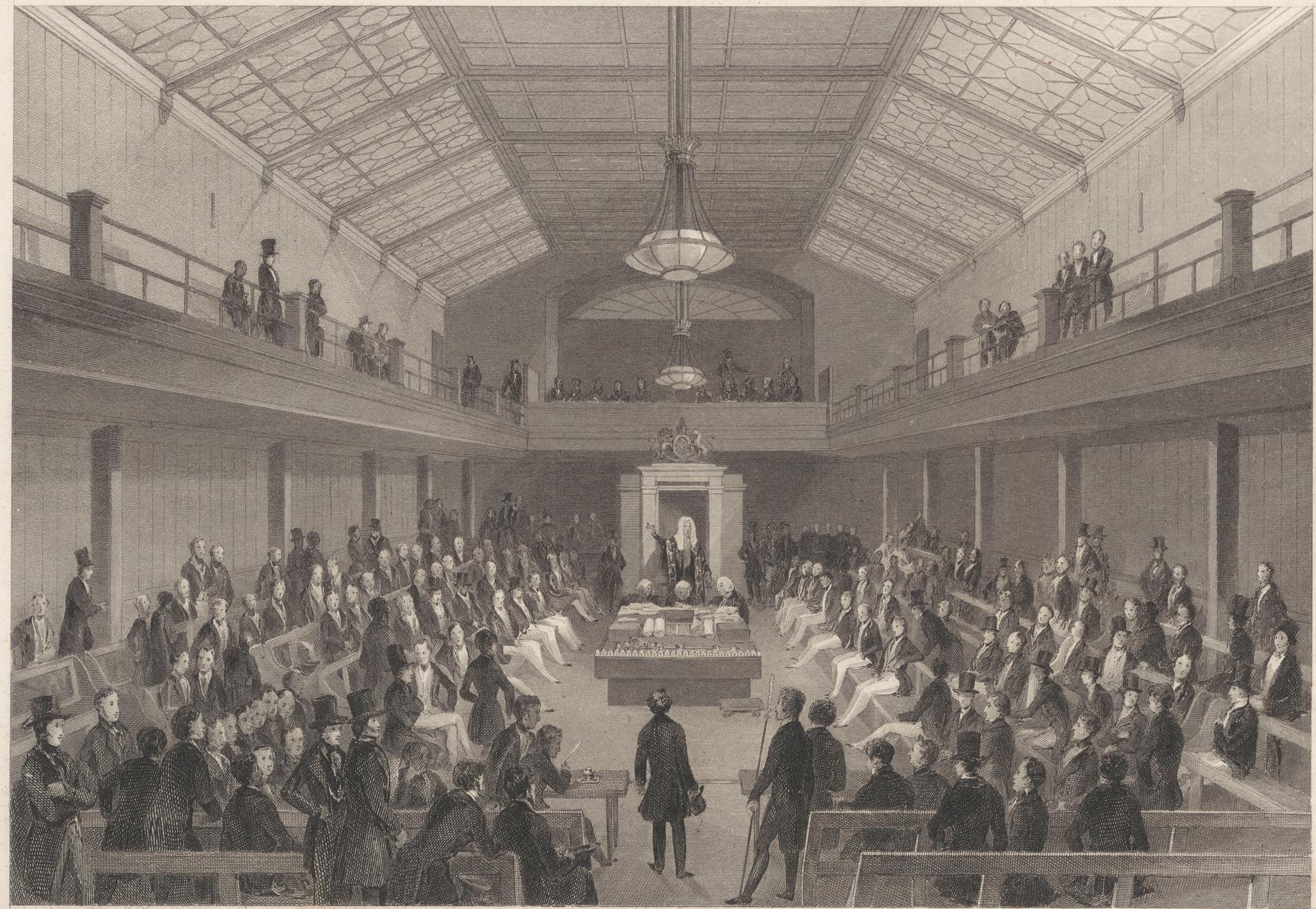
- The temporary House of Commons chamber in use at the time
- Members: 658
- Speaker: Charles Shaw-Lefevre
- Leader: Lord John Russell; Robert Peel (until 1846)
- Prime Minister: Lord John Russell; Robert Peel (until 1846)
- Leader of the Opposition: Lord George Bentinck; Lord John Russell (until 1846)

House of Lords
- Lord Chancellor: Charles Pepys, 1st Earl of Cottenham; The Lord Lyndhurst (until 1846)
- Leader: The Marquess of Lansdowne; The Duke of Wellington (until 1846)
- Leader of the Opposition: The Lord Stanley of Bickerstaffe; The Marquess of Lansdowne (1842–1846); The Viscount Melbourne (until October 1842)

Crown-in-Parliament Victoria

Sessions
- 1st: 19 August 1841 – 7 October 1841
- 2nd: 3 February 1842 – 12 August 1842
- 3rd: 2 February 1843 – 24 August 1843
- 4th: 1 February 1844 – 5 September 1844
- 5th: 4 February 1845 – 9 August 1845
- 6th: 22 January 1846 – 28 August 1846
- 7th: 19 January 1847 – 23 July 1847

This is a list of members of Parliament (MPs) elected in the 1841 general election.

Table of contents:

A B C D E F G H I K L M N O P Q R S T W Y Changes

== A ==
| Constituency | MP | Party |
| Aberdeen | Alexander Bannerman | Whig |
| Aberdeenshire | William Gordon | Conservative |
| Abingdon | Thomas Duffield | Conservative |
| Andover (two members) | Ralph Etwall | Whig |
| Andover (two members) | William Paget | Whig |
| Anglesey | William Stanley | Whig |
| Antrim (two members) | Nathaniel Alexander | Conservative |
| Antrim (two members) | John Irving | Conservative |
| Argyllshire | Alexander Campbell | Conservative |
| Armagh | John Dawson Rawdon | Whig |
| County Armagh (two members) | Archibald Acheson | Whig |
| County Armagh (two members) | William Verner | Conservative |
| Arundel | Henry Fitzalan-Howard | Whig |
| Ashburton | William Jardine | Whig |
| Ashton-under-Lyne | Charles Hindley | Radical |
| Athlone | George Beresford | Conservative |
| Aylesbury (two members) | Charles Baillie-Hamilton | Conservative |
| Aylesbury (two members) | Rice Richard Clayton | Conservative |
| Ayr | Patrick Crichton-Stuart | Whig |
| Ayrshire | James Carr-Boyle | Conservative |
== B ==
| Constituency | MP | Party |
| Banbury | Henry William Tancred | Whig |
| Bandon | Joseph Devonsher Jackson | Conservative |
| Banffshire | James Duff | Whig |
| Barnstaple (two members) | Montague Gore | Conservative |
| Barnstaple (two members) | Frederick Hodgson | Conservative |
| Bath (two members) | Adam Haldane-Duncan | Whig |
| Bath (two members) | John Arthur Roebuck | Radical |
| Beaumaris | Frederick Paget | Whig |
| Bedford (two members) | Henry Stuart | Conservative |
| Bedford (two members) | Frederick Polhill | Conservative |
| Bedfordshire (two members) | John Egerton | Conservative |
| Bedfordshire (two members) | William Astell | Conservative |
| Belfast (two members) | William Gillilan Johnson | Conservative |
| Belfast (two members) | James Emerson Tennent | Conservative |
| Berkshire (Three members) | Robert Palmer | Conservative |
| Berkshire (Three members) | William Barrington | Conservative |
| Berkshire (Three members) | Philip Pusey | Peelite |
| Berwickshire | Hugh Purves-Hume-Campbell | Conservative |
| Berwick-upon-Tweed (two members) | Matthew Forster | Whig |
| Berwick-upon-Tweed (two members) | Richard Hodgson | Conservative |
| Beverley (two members) | James Hogg | Conservative |
| Beverley (two members) | John Towneley | Whig |
| Bewdley | Thomas Winnington | Whig |
| Birmingham (two members) | George Muntz | Radical |
| Birmingham (two members) | Joshua Scholefield | Radical |
| Blackburn (two members) | William Feilden | Conservative |
| Blackburn (two members) | John Hornby | Conservative |
| Bodmin (two members) | John Dunn Gardner | Conservative |
| Bodmin (two members) | Charles Vivian | Whig |
| Bolton (two members) | Peter Ainsworth | Whig |
| Bolton (two members) | John Bowring | Radical |
| Boston (two members) | John Studholme Brownrigg | Conservative |
| Boston (two members) | James Duke | Whig |
| Bradford (two members) | John Hardy | Conservative |
| Bradford (two members) | William Cunliffe Lister | Whig |
| Brecon | Charles Rodney Morgan | Conservative |
| Breconshire | Thomas Wood | Conservative |
| Bridgnorth (two members) | Robert Pigot | Conservative |
| Bridgnorth (two members) | Thomas Charlton Whitmore | Conservative |
| Bridgwater (two members) | Thomas Seaton Forman | Conservative |
| Bridgwater (two members) | Henry Broadwood | Conservative |
| Bridport (two members) | Thomas Alexander Mitchell | Radical |
| Bridport (two members) | Henry Warburton | Radical |
| Brighton (two members) | George Pechell | Whig |
| Brighton (two members) | Isaac Wigney | Radical |
| Bristol (two members) | Henry FitzHardinge Berkeley | Radical |
| Bristol (two members) | Philip William Skinner Miles | Conservative |
| Buckingham (two members) | John Chetwode | Conservative |
| Buckingham (two members) | Thomas Fremantle | Conservative |
| Buckinghamshire (Three members) | Caledon Du Pré | Conservative |
| Buckinghamshire (Three members) | Charles Scott-Murray | Conservative |
| Buckinghamshire (Three members) | William Young | Conservative |
| Bury | Richard Walker | Whig |
| Bury St Edmunds (two members) | Frederick Hervey | Conservative |
| Bury St Edmunds (two members) | Charles FitzRoy | Whig |
| Buteshire | William Rae | Conservative |
== C ==
| Constituency | MP | Party |
| Caernarvon | William Bulkeley Hughes | Conservative |
| Caernarvonshire | Edward Douglas-Pennant | Conservative |
| Caithness | George Traill | Whig |
| Calne | Henry Petty-FitzMaurice | Whig |
| Cambridge (two members) | Alexander Grant | Conservative |
| Cambridge (two members) | John Manners-Sutton | Conservative |
| Cambridge University (two members) | Henry Goulburn | Conservative |
| Cambridge University (two members) | Charles Law | Conservative |
| Cambridgeshire (Three members) | Eliot Yorke | Conservative |
| Cambridgeshire (Three members) | John Peter Allix | Conservative |
| Cambridgeshire (Three members) | Richard Jefferson Eaton | Conservative |
| Canterbury (two members) | James Bradshaw | Conservative |
| Canterbury (two members) | George Smythe | Conservative |
| Cardiff | John Iltyd Nicholl | Conservative |
| Cardigan | Pryse Pryse | Whig |
| Cardiganshire | William Edward Powell | Conservative |
| Carlisle (two members) | Philip Howard | Whig |
| Carlisle (two members) | William Marshall | Whig |
| Carlow | Brownlow Layard | Whig |
| County Carlow (two members) | Henry Bruen | Conservative |
| County Carlow (two members) | Thomas Bunbury | Conservative |
| Carmarthen | David Morris | Whig |
| Carmarthenshire (two members) | John Jones | Conservative |
| Carmarthenshire (two members) | George Rice-Trevor | Conservative |
| Carrickfergus | Peter Kirk | Conservative |
| Cashel | Joseph Stock | Whig |
| Cavan (two members) | Henry John Clements | Conservative |
| Cavan (two members) | John Young | Conservative |
| Chatham | George Byng | Whig |
| Cheltenham | Craven Berkeley | Whig |
| Cheshire North (two members) | William Egerton | Conservative |
| Cheshire North (two members) | George Legh | Conservative |
| Cheshire South (two members) | Philip Grey Egerton | Conservative |
| Cheshire South (two members) | John Tollemache | Conservative |
| Chester (two members) | Robert Grosvenor | Whig |
| Chester (two members) | John Jervis | Radical |
| Chichester (two members) | John Abel Smith | Whig |
| Chichester (two members) | Arthur Lennox | Conservative |
| Chippenham (two members) | Joseph Neeld | Conservative |
| Chippenham (two members) | Henry George Boldero | Conservative |
| Christchurch | George Henry Rose | Conservative |
| Cirencester (two members) | William Cripps | Conservative |
| Cirencester (two members) | Thomas Chester-Master | Conservative |
| Clackmannanshire and Kinross-shire | George Abercromby | Whig |
| Clare (two members) | William Nugent Macnamara | Irish Repeal |
| Clare (two members) | Cornelius O'Brien | Irish Repeal |
| Clitheroe | Mathew Wilson | Whig |
| Clonmel | David Richard Pigot | Whig |
| Cockermouth (two members) | Edward Horsman | Whig |
| Cockermouth (two members) | Henry Aglionby Aglionby | Radical |
| Colchester (two members) | Richard Sanderson | Conservative |
| Colchester (two members) | George Smyth | Conservative |
| Coleraine | Edward Litton | Conservative |
| Cork City (two members) | Daniel Callaghan | Irish Repeal |
| Cork City (two members) | Francis Murphy | Whig |
| County Cork (two members) | Edmond Roche | Irish Repeal |
| County Cork (two members) | Daniel O'Connell | Irish Repeal |
| East Cornwall (two members) | Edward Eliot | Conservative |
| East Cornwall (two members) | William Rashleigh | Conservative |
| West Cornwall (two members) | Edward Wynne-Pendarves | Whig |
| West Cornwall (two members) | George Boscawen | Conservative |
| Coventry (two members) | Edward Ellice | Whig |
| Coventry (two members) | William Williams | Radical |
| Cricklade (two members) | John Neeld | Conservative |
| Cricklade (two members) | Henry Thomas Howard | Whig |
| East Cumberland (two members) | Charles Howard | Whig |
| East Cumberland (two members) | William James | Radical |
| West Cumberland (two members) | Samuel Irton | Conservative |
| West Cumberland (two members) | Edward Stanley | Conservative |
== D ==
| Constituency | MP | Party |
| Dartmouth | John Seale | Whig |
| Denbigh Boroughs | Townshend Mainwaring | Conservative |
| Denbighshire (two members) | Watkin Williams-Wynn | Conservative |
| Denbighshire (two members) | William Bagot | Conservative |
| Derby (two members) | John Ponsonby | Whig |
| Derby (two members) | Edward Strutt | Whig |
| Derbyshire North (two members) | George Cavendish | Whig |
| Derbyshire North (two members) | William Evans | Whig |
| Derbyshire South (two members) | Charles Robert Colvile | Peelite |
| Derbyshire South (two members) | Edward Miller Mundy | Conservative |
| Devizes (two members) | George Heneage | Conservative |
| Devizes (two members) | T. H. S. Sotheron-Estcourt | Conservative |
| Devonport (two members) | Henry Tufnell | Whig |
| Devonport (two members) | George Grey | Whig |
| North Devon (two members) | Thomas Dyke Acland | Conservative |
| North Devon (two members) | Lewis William Buck | Conservative |
| South Devon (two members) | John Yarde-Buller | Conservative |
| South Devon (two members) | William Courtenay | Conservative |
| Donegal (two members) | Edmund Hayes | Conservative |
| Donegal (two members) | Edward Michael Conolly | Conservative |
| Dorchester (two members) | Henry Ashley | Conservative |
| Dorchester (two members) | James Graham | Conservative |
| Dorset (Three members) | George Bankes | Conservative |
| Dorset (Three members) | Anthony Ashley-Cooper | Conservative |
| Dorset (Three members) | Henry Sturt | Conservative |
| Dover (two members) | Edward Royd Rice | Whig |
| Dover (two members) | John Reid | Conservative |
| Down (two members) | Arthur Hill | Conservative |
| Down (two members) | Frederick Stewart | Conservative |
| Downpatrick | David Stewart Ker | Conservative |
| Drogheda | William Somerville | Whig |
| Droitwich | John Pakington | Conservative |
| Dublin (two members) | Edward Grogan | Conservative |
| Dublin (two members) | John Beattie West | Conservative |
| County Dublin (two members) | James Hans Hamilton | Conservative |
| County Dublin (two members) | Thomas Edward Taylor | Conservative |
| Dublin University (two members) | Thomas Langlois Lefroy | Conservative |
| Dublin University (two members) | Frederick Shaw | Conservative |
| Dudley | Thomas Hawkes | Conservative |
| Dumfries | William Ewart | Radical |
| Dumfriesshire | John Hope-Johnstone | Conservative |
| Dunbartonshire | Alexander Smollett | Conservative |
| Dundalk | Thomas Nicholas Redington | Whig |
| Dundee | George Duncan | Whig |
| Dungannon | Thomas Knox | Conservative |
| Dungarvan | Richard Lalor Sheil | Radical |
| Durham City (two members) | Thomas Granger | Radical |
| Durham City (two members) | Robert FitzRoy | Conservative |
| North Durham (two members) | Hedworth Lambton | Whig |
| North Durham (two members) | Henry Liddell | Conservative |
| South Durham (two members) | Harry Vane | Whig |
| South Durham (two members) | John Bowes | Whig |
== E ==
| Constituency | MP | Party |
| East Retford (two members) | Granville Harcourt-Vernon | Conservative |
| East Retford (two members) | Arthur Duncombe | Conservative |
| Edinburgh (two members) | Thomas Babington Macaulay | Whig |
| Edinburgh (two members) | William Gibson-Craig | Whig |
| Elgin | Andrew Leith Hay | Whig |
| Elginshire and Nairnshire | Charles Cumming-Bruce | Conservative |
| Ennis | Hewitt Bridgeman | Radical |
| Enniskillen | Arthur Henry Cole | Conservative |
| Essex North (two members) | John Tyrell | Conservative |
| Essex North (two members) | Charles Gray Round | Conservative |
| Essex South (two members) | Thomas William Bramston | Conservative |
| Essex South (two members) | George Palmer | Conservative |
| Evesham (two members) | Peter Borthwick | Conservative |
| Evesham (two members) | Marcus Hill | Whig |
| Exeter (two members) | Edward Divett | Radical |
| Exeter (two members) | William Webb Follett | Conservative |
| Eye | Edward Kerrison | Conservative |
== F ==
| Constituency | MP | Party |
| Falkirk Burghs | William Baird | Conservative |
| Fermanagh (two members) | Mervyn Edward Archdale | Conservative |
| Fermanagh (two members) | Arthur Brooke | Conservative |
| Fife | James Erskine Wemyss | Whig |
| Finsbury (two members) | Thomas Slingsby Duncombe | Radical |
| Finsbury (two members) | Thomas Wakley | Radical |
| Flint | Richard Williams-Bulkeley | Whig |
| Flintshire | Edward Lloyd-Mostyn | Whig |
| Forfarshire | Frederick Gordon-Hallyburton | Whig |
| Frome | Thomas Sheppard | Conservative |
== G ==
| Constituency | MP | Party |
| Galway Borough (two members) | Martin Blake | Irish Repeal |
| Galway Borough (two members) | Valentine Blake | Irish Repeal |
| County Galway (two members) | John James Bodkin | Whig |
| County Galway (two members) | Thomas Barnwall Martin | Whig |
| Gateshead | William Hutt | Radical |
| Glamorganshire (two members) | Christopher Rice Mansel Talbot | Whig |
| Glamorganshire (two members) | Edwin Wyndham-Quin | Conservative |
| Glasgow (two members) | John Dennistoun | Whig |
| Glasgow (two members) | James Oswald | Whig |
| Gloucester (two members) | Maurice Berkeley | Whig |
| Gloucester (two members) | John Phillpotts | Whig |
| Gloucestershire East (two members) | Christopher William Codrington | Conservative |
| Gloucestershire East (two members) | Francis Charteris | Conservative |
| Gloucestershire West (two members) | Robert Hale | Conservative |
| Gloucestershire West (two members) | Grantley Berkeley | Whig |
| Grantham (two members) | Glynne Earle-Welby | Conservative |
| Grantham (two members) | Frederick Tollemache | Conservative |
| Great Grimsby | Edward Heneage | Whig |
| Great Marlow (two members) | Thomas Peers Williams | Conservative |
| Great Marlow (two members) | William Clayton | Whig |
| Great Yarmouth (two members) | Charles Rumbold | Whig |
| Great Yarmouth (two members) | William Wilshere | Whig |
| Greenock | Robert Wallace | Whig |
| Greenwich (two members) | James Whitley Deans Dundas | Whig |
| Greenwich (two members) | Edward George Barnard | Radical |
| Guildford (two members) | Ross Donnelly Mangles | Whig |
| Guildford (two members) | Charles Baring Wall | Whig |
== H ==
| Constituency | MP | Party |
| Haddington | James Maitland Balfour | Conservative |
| Haddingtonshire | Thomas Buchan-Hepburn | Conservative |
| Halifax (two members) | Charles Wood | Whig |
| Halifax (two members) | Edward Davis Protheroe | Radical |
| Hampshire North (two members) | Charles Shaw-Lefevre | Speaker (Whig) |
| Hampshire North (two members) | William Heathcote | Conservative |
| Hampshire South (two members) | Henry Combe Compton | Conservative |
| Hampshire South (two members) | John Willis Fleming | Conservative |
| Harwich (two members) | John Attwood | Conservative |
| Harwich (two members) | William Beresford | Conservative |
| Hastings (two members) | Joseph Planta | Conservative |
| Hastings (two members) | Robert Hollond | Radical |
| Haverfordwest | Richard Philipps | Whig |
| Helston | Richard Vyvyan | Conservative |
| Hereford (two members) | Edward Clive | Whig |
| Hereford (two members) | Henry William Hobhouse | Whig |
| Herefordshire (Three members) | Thomas Baskerville | Conservative |
| Herefordshire (Three members) | Joseph Bailey | Conservative |
| Herefordshire (Three members) | Kedgwin Hoskins | Whig |
| Hertford (two members) | William Cowper-Temple | Whig |
| Hertford (two members) | Philip Stanhope | Conservative |
| Hertfordshire (Three members) | James Grimston | Conservative |
| Hertfordshire (Three members) | Granville Ryder | Conservative |
| Hertfordshire (Three members) | Abel Smith | Conservative |
| Honiton (two members) | Hugh Duncan Baillie | Conservative |
| Honiton (two members) | Forster Alleyne McGeachy | Conservative |
| Horsham | Robert Scarlett | Conservative |
| Huddersfield | William Crompton-Stansfield | Whig |
| Huntingdon (two members) | Jonathan Peel | Conservative |
| Huntingdon (two members) | Frederick Pollock | Conservative |
| Huntingdonshire (two members) | Edward Fellowes | Conservative |
| Huntingdonshire (two members) | George Thornhill | Conservative |
| Hythe | Stewart Marjoribanks | Whig |
== I ==
| Constituency | MP | Party |
| Inverness Burghs | James Morrison | Whig |
| Inverness-shire | Henry Baillie | Conservative |
| Ipswich (two members) | George Rennie | Whig |
| Ipswich (two members) | Rigby Wason | Whig |
| Isle of Wight | William à Court-Holmes | Conservative |
== K ==
| Constituency | MP | Party |
| Kendal | George William Wood | Whig |
| Kent East (two members) | Edward Knatchbull | Conservative |
| Kent East (two members) | John Pemberton Plumptre | Conservative |
| Kent West (two members) | Edmund Filmer | Conservative |
| Kent West (two members) | Charles Marsham | Conservative |
| Kerry (two members) | William Browne | Whig |
| Kerry (two members) | Morgan John O'Connell | Irish Repeal |
| Kidderminster | Richard Godson | Conservative |
| Kildare (two members) | Robert Archbold | Whig |
| Kildare (two members) | Richard More O'Ferrall | Whig |
| Kilkenny City | John O'Connell | Irish Repeal |
| County Kilkenny (two members) | Pierce Butler | Irish Repeal |
| County Kilkenny (two members) | George Bryan | Whig |
| Kilmarnock Burghs | Alexander Johnston | Whig |
| Kincardineshire | Hugh Arbuthnott | Conservative |
| King's County (two members) | Andrew Armstrong | Whig |
| King's County (two members) | John Westenra | Whig |
| King's Lynn (two members) | Stratford Canning | Conservative |
| King's Lynn (two members) | George Bentinck | Conservative |
| Kingston upon Hull (two members) | John Hanmer | Conservative |
| Kingston upon Hull (two members) | Walter James | Conservative |
| Kinsale | William Henry Watson | Whig |
| Kirkcaldy Burghs | Robert Munro-Ferguson | Whig |
| Kirkcudbright | Alexander Murray | Whig |
| Knaresborough (two members) | William Ferrand | Conservative |
| Knaresborough (two members) | Andrew Lawson | Conservative |
== L ==
| Constituency | MP | Party |
| Lambeth (two members) | Charles Tennyson-d'Eyncourt | Whig |
| Lambeth (two members) | Benjamin Hawes | Whig |
| Lanarkshire | William Lockhart | Conservative |
| Lancashire North (two members) | John Wilson-Patten | Conservative |
| Lancashire North (two members) | Edward Smith-Stanley | Conservative |
| Lancashire South (two members) | Francis Egerton | Conservative |
| Lancashire South (two members) | Richard Bootle-Wilbraham | Conservative |
| Lancaster (two members) | George Marton | Conservative |
| Lancaster (two members) | Thomas Greene | Conservative |
| Launceston | Henry Hardinge | Conservative |
| Leeds (two members) | William Beckett | Conservative |
| Leeds (two members) | William Aldam | Whig |
| Leicester (two members) | John Easthope | Radical |
| Leicester (two members) | Wynne Ellis | Radical |
| Leicestershire North (two members) | Edward Farnham | Conservative |
| Leicestershire North (two members) | Charles Manners | Conservative |
| Leicestershire South (two members) | Henry Halford | Conservative |
| Leicestershire South (two members) | Charles Packe | Conservative |
| Leith Burghs | Andrew Rutherfurd | Whig |
| Leitrim (two members) | William Clements | Whig |
| Leitrim (two members) | Samuel White | Whig |
| Leominster (two members) | Charles Greenaway | Whig |
| Leominster (two members) | James Wigram | Conservative |
| Lewes (two members) | Howard Elphinstone | Radical |
| Lewes (two members) | Summers Harford | Radical |
| Lichfield (two members) | Alfred Paget | Whig |
| Lichfield (two members) | George Anson | Whig |
| Limerick City (two members) | John O'Brien | Radical |
| Limerick City (two members) | David Roche | Irish Repeal |
| County Limerick (two members) | William Smith O'Brien | Whig |
| County Limerick (two members) | Caleb Powell | Whig |
| Lincoln (two members) | Charles Sibthorp | Conservative |
| Lincoln (two members) | William Rickford Collett | Conservative |
| Lincolnshire North (two members) | Robert Christopher | Conservative |
| Lincolnshire North (two members) | Charles Anderson-Pelham | Whig |
| Lincolnshire South (two members) | John Trollope | Conservative |
| Lincolnshire South (two members) | Christopher Turnor | Conservative |
| Linlithgowshire | Charles Hope | Conservative |
| Lisburn | Henry Meynell | Conservative |
| Liskeard | Charles Buller | Radical |
| Liverpool (two members) | Cresswell Cresswell | Conservative |
| Liverpool (two members) | Dudley Ryder | Conservative |
| The City of London (Four members) | John Masterman | Conservative |
| The City of London (Four members) | John Russell | Whig |
| The City of London (Four members) | George Lyall | Conservative |
| The City of London (Four members) | Sir Matthew Wood | Whig |
| Londonderry City | Robert Ferguson | Whig |
| County Londonderry (two members) | Theobald Jones | Conservative |
| County Londonderry (two members) | Robert Bateson | Conservative |
| County Longford (two members) | Henry White | Irish Repeal |
| County Longford (two members) | Luke White | Irish Repeal |
| County Louth (two members) | Thomas Vesey Dawson | Whig |
| County Louth (two members) | Richard Bellew | Whig |
| Ludlow (two members) | James Ackers | Conservative |
| Ludlow (two members) | Beriah Botfield | Conservative |
| Lyme Regis | William Pinney | Whig |
| Lymington (two members) | John Stewart | Conservative |
| Lymington (two members) | William Alexander Mackinnon | Conservative |
== M ==
| Constituency | MP | Party |
| Macclesfield (two members) | John Brocklehurst | Whig |
| Macclesfield (two members) | Thomas Grimsditch | Conservative |
| Maidstone (two members) | George Dodd | Conservative |
| Maidstone (two members) | Alexander Beresford Hope | Conservative |
| Maldon (two members) | Quintin Dick | Conservative |
| Maldon (two members) | John Round | Conservative |
| Mallow | Denham Jephson-Norreys | Whig |
| Malmesbury | James Howard | Whig |
| Malton (two members) | Evelyn Denison | Whig |
| Malton (two members) | John Walbanke-Childers | Whig |
| Manchester (two members) | Thomas Milner Gibson | Radical |
| Manchester (two members) | Mark Philips | Whig |
| Marlborough (two members) | Ernest Brudenell-Bruce | Conservative |
| Marlborough (two members) | Henry Bingham Baring | Conservative |
| Marylebone (two members) | Benjamin Hall | Whig |
| Marylebone (two members) | Charles Napier | Radical |
| Mayo (two members) | Mark Blake | Irish Repeal |
| Mayo (two members) | Robert Dillon Browne | Irish Repeal |
| Meath (two members) | Daniel O'Connell | Irish Repeal |
| Meath (two members) | Henry Grattan | Irish Repeal |
| Merioneth | Richard Richards | Conservative |
| Merthyr Tydvil | John Josiah Guest | Whig |
| Middlesex (two members) | George Byng | Whig |
| Middlesex (two members) | Thomas Wood | Conservative |
| Midhurst | Horace Seymour | Conservative |
| Midlothian | William Ramsay | Conservative |
| Monaghan (two members) | Evelyn Shirley | Conservative |
| Monaghan (two members) | Henry Westenra | Whig |
| Monmouth Boroughs | Reginald Blewitt | Whig |
| Monmouthshire (two members) | Octavius Morgan | Conservative |
| Monmouthshire (two members) | Granville Somerset | Conservative |
| Montgomery | Hugh Cholmondeley | Conservative |
| Montgomeryshire | Charles Williams-Wynn | Conservative |
| Montrose | Patrick Chalmers | Radical |
| Morpeth | Edward Howard | Whig |
== N ==
| Constituency | MP | Party |
| Newark (two members) | William Ewart Gladstone | Conservative |
| Newark (two members) | John Manners | Conservative |
| Newcastle-under-Lyme (two members) | Edmund Buckley | Conservative |
| Newcastle-under-Lyme (two members) | John Quincey Harris | Whig |
| Newcastle-upon-Tyne (two members) | John Hodgson-Hinde | Conservative |
| Newcastle-upon-Tyne (two members) | William Ord | Whig |
| Newport (two members) | Charles Wykeham Martin | Conservative |
| Newport (two members) | William Hamilton | Conservative |
| New Ross | Robert Gore | Whig |
| Newry | Francis Needham | Conservative |
| New Shoreham (two members) | Charles Burrell | Conservative |
| New Shoreham (two members) | Charles Goring | Conservative |
| Norfolk East (two members) | Edmond Wodehouse | Conservative |
| Norfolk East (two members) | Henry Negus Burroughes | Conservative |
| Norfolk West (two members) | William Bagge | Conservative |
| Norfolk West (two members) | William Chute | Conservative |
| Northallerton | William Battie-Wrightson | Whig |
| Northampton (two members) | Robert Vernon | Whig |
| Northampton (two members) | Raikes Currie | Radical |
| Northamptonshire North (two members) | Thomas Maunsell | Conservative |
| Northamptonshire North (two members) | Augustus Stafford | Conservative |
| Northamptonshire South (two members) | William Ralph Cartwright | Conservative |
| Northamptonshire South (two members) | Rainald Knightley | Conservative |
| Northumberland North (two members) | Charles Bennet | Conservative |
| Northumberland North (two members) | Addison Cresswell | Conservative |
| Northumberland South (two members) | Matthew Bell | Conservative |
| Northumberland South (two members) | Saville Ogle | Whig |
| Norwich (two members) | Benjamin Smith | Whig |
| Norwich (two members) | Arthur Wellesley | Conservative |
| Nottingham (two members) | John Hobhouse | Radical |
| Nottingham (two members) | George Larpent | Whig |
| Nottinghamshire North (two members) | Henry Gally Knight | Conservative |
| Nottinghamshire North (two members) | Thomas Houldsworth | Conservative |
| Nottinghamshire South (two members) | Henry Pelham-Clinton | Conservative |
| Nottinghamshire South (two members) | Lancelot Rolleston | Conservative |
== O ==
| Constituency | MP | Party |
| Oldham (two members) | John Fielden | Radical |
| Oldham (two members) | William Augustus Johnson | Radical |
| Orkney and Shetland | Frederick Dundas | Whig |
| Oxford (two members) | James Haughton Langston | Whig |
| Oxford (two members) | Donald Maclean | Conservative |
| Oxfordshire (Three members) | George Harcourt | Conservative |
| Oxfordshire (Three members) | J. W. Henley | Conservative |
| Oxfordshire (Three members) | Montagu Bertie | Conservative |
| Oxford University (two members) | Robert Inglis | Conservative |
| Oxford University (two members) | Thomas Grimston Estcourt | Conservative |
== P ==
| Constituency | MP | Party |
| Paisley | Archibald Hastie | Radical |
| Peeblesshire | William Forbes Mackenzie | Conservative |
| Pembroke | John Owen | Conservative |
| Pembrokeshire | John Campbell | Conservative |
| Penryn and Falmouth (two members) | James Hanway Plumridge | Whig |
| Penryn and Falmouth (two members) | John Vivian | Whig |
| Perth | Fox Maule | Whig |
| Perthshire | Henry Home-Drummond | Conservative |
| Peterborough (two members) | George Wentworth-FitzWilliam | Whig |
| Peterborough (two members) | Robert Heron | Whig |
| Petersfield | William Joliffe | Conservative |
| Plymouth (two members) | Thomas Gill | Whig |
| Plymouth (two members) | Hugh Fortescue | Whig |
| Pontefract (two members) | Richard Monckton Milnes | Conservative |
| Pontefract (two members) | John Savile | Conservative |
| Poole (two members) | Charles Ponsonby | Whig |
| Poole (two members) | George Philips | Whig |
| Portarlington | George Dawson-Damer | Conservative |
| Portsmouth (two members) | Francis Baring | Whig |
| Portsmouth (two members) | George Staunton | Whig |
| Preston (two members) | George Strickland | Whig |
| Preston (two members) | Peter Hesketh-Fleetwood | Whig |
== Q ==
| Constituency | MP | Party |
| Queen's County (two members) | Sir Charles Coote, 9th Baronet | Conservative |
| Queen's County (two members) | Thomas Vesey | Conservative |
== R ==
| Constituency | MP | Party |
| Radnor | Richard Price | Conservative |
| Radnorshire | John Walsh | Conservative |
| Reading (two members) | Henry Cadogan | Conservative |
| Reading (two members) | Charles Russell | Conservative |
| Reigate | Charles Somers-Cocks | Conservative |
| Renfrewshire | Patrick Maxwell Stewart | Whig |
| Richmond (two members) | John Dundas | Whig |
| Richmond (two members) | William Ridley-Colborne | Whig |
| Ripon (two members) | George Cockburn | Conservative |
| Ripon (two members) | Thomas Pemberton | Conservative |
| Rochdale | William Sharman Crawford | Radical |
| Rochester (two members) | William Bodkin | Conservative |
| Rochester (two members) | James Douglas | Conservative |
| Roscommon (two members) | Fitzstephen French | Whig |
| Roscommon (two members) | Denis O'Conor | Irish Repeal |
| Ross and Cromarty | Thomas Mackenzie | Conservative |
| Roxburghshire | Francis Scott | Conservative |
| Rutland (two members) | Gilbert Heathcote | Whig |
| Rutland (two members) | William Dawnay | Conservative |
| Rye | Herbert Barrett Curteis | Whig |
== S ==
| Constituency | MP | Party |
| St Albans (two members) | William Hare | Whig |
| St Albans (two members) | George Repton | Conservative |
| St Andrews | Edward Ellice | Whig |
| St Ives | William Tyringham Praed | Conservative |
| Salford | Joseph Brotherton | Radical |
| Salisbury (two members) | William Bird Brodie | Whig |
| Salisbury (two members) | Wadham Wyndham | Conservative |
| Sandwich (two members) | Hugh Hamilton Lindsay | Conservative |
| Sandwich (two members) | Edward Troubridge | Whig |
| Scarborough (two members) | John Vanden-Bempde-Johnstone | Conservative |
| Scarborough (two members) | Frederick Trench | Conservative |
| Selkirkshire | Alexander Pringle | Conservative |
| Shaftesbury | Henry Howard | Whig |
| Sheffield (two members) | John Parker | Whig |
| Sheffield (two members) | Henry George Ward | Radical |
| Shrewsbury (two members) | Benjamin Disraeli | Conservative |
| Shrewsbury (two members) | George Tomline | Conservative |
| Shropshire North (two members) | William Ormsby-Gore | Conservative |
| Shropshire North (two members) | Rowland Hill | Conservative |
| Shropshire South (two members) | Robert Clive | Conservative |
| Shropshire South (two members) | Henry Vane | Conservative |
| Sligo | John Patrick Somers | Irish Repeal |
| County Sligo (two members) | Alexander Perceval | Conservative |
| County Sligo (two members) | William Ormsby-Gore | Conservative |
| Somerset East (two members) | William Miles | Conservative |
| Somerset East (two members) | William Gore-Langton | Whig |
| Somerset West (two members) | Thomas Dyke Acland | Conservative |
| Somerset West (two members) | Francis Dickinson | Conservative |
| Southampton (two members) | James Bruce | Conservative |
| Southampton (two members) | Charles Cecil Martyn | Conservative |
| South Shields | John Wawn | Radical |
| Southwark (two members) | Benjamin Wood | Whig |
| Southwark (two members) | John Humphery | Whig |
| Stafford (two members) | Swynfen Carnegie | Conservative |
| Stafford (two members) | Edward Manningham-Buller | Whig |
| Staffordshire North (two members) | Charles Adderley | Conservative |
| Staffordshire North (two members) | Jesse David Watts-Russell | Conservative |
| Staffordshire South (two members) | George Anson | Whig |
| Staffordshire South (two members) | Henry Chetwynd-Talbot | Conservative |
| Stamford (two members) | George Clerk | Conservative |
| Stamford (two members) | Charles Manners | Conservative |
| Stirling | Archibald Primrose | Whig |
| Stirlingshire | William Forbes | Conservative |
| Stockport (two members) | Richard Cobden | Radical |
| Stockport (two members) | Henry Marsland | Radical |
| Stoke-upon-Trent (two members) | John Lewis Ricardo | Whig |
| Stoke-upon-Trent (two members) | William Taylor Copeland | Conservative |
| Stroud (two members) | William Henry Stanton | Whig |
| Stroud (two members) | George Julius Poulett Scrope | Whig |
| Sudbury (two members) | Frederick Villiers Meynell | Whig |
| Sudbury (two members) | David Ochterlony Dyce Sombre | Whig |
| Suffolk East (two members) | John Henniker-Major | Conservative |
| Suffolk East (two members) | Charles Broke Vere | Conservative |
| Suffolk West (two members) | Harry Spencer Waddington | Conservative |
| Suffolk West (two members) | Robert Rushbrooke | Conservative |
| Sunderland (two members) | William Thompson | Conservative |
| Sunderland (two members) | David Barclay | Whig |
| Surrey East (two members) | Edmund Antrobus | Conservative |
| Surrey East (two members) | Henry Kemble | Conservative |
| Surrey West (two members) | John Trotter | Conservative |
| Surrey West (two members) | William Joseph Denison | Whig |
| Sussex East (two members) | Augustus Fuller | Conservative |
| Sussex East (two members) | George Darby | Conservative |
| Sussex West (two members) | Charles Gordon-Lennox | Conservative |
| Sussex West (two members) | Charles Wyndham | Conservative |
| Sutherland | David Dundas | Whig |
| Swansea District | John Henry Vivian | Whig |
== T ==
| Constituency | MP | Party |
| Tamworth (two members) | Edward Henry A'Court | Conservative |
| Tamworth (two members) | Robert Peel | Conservative |
| Taunton (two members) | Henry Labouchere | Whig |
| Taunton (two members) | Edward Thomas Bainbridge | Whig |
| Tavistock (two members) | John Rundle | Whig |
| Tavistock (two members) | Edward Russell | Whig |
| Tewkesbury (two members) | John Martin | Whig |
| Tewkesbury (two members) | William Dowdeswell | Conservative |
| Thetford (two members) | Henry FitzRoy | Whig |
| Thetford (two members) | Bingham Baring | Conservative |
| Thirsk | John Bell | Whig |
| Tipperary (two members) | Valentine Maher | Whig |
| Tipperary (two members) | Robert Otway-Cave | Whig |
| Tiverton (two members) | John Heathcoat | Whig |
| Tiverton (two members) | Henry Temple | Whig |
| Totnes (two members) | Edward Seymour | Whig |
| Totnes (two members) | Charles Barry Baldwin | Conservative |
| Tower Hamlets (two members) | William Clay | Radical |
| Tower Hamlets (two members) | Charles Richard Fox | Whig |
| Tralee | Maurice O'Connell | Irish Repeal |
| Truro (two members) | John Vivian | Conservative |
| Truro (two members) | Edmund Turner | Whig |
| Tynemouth and North Shields | Henry Mitcalfe | Whig |
| Tyrone (two members) | Henry Lowry-Corry | Conservative |
| Tyrone (two members) | Claud Hamilton | Conservative |
== W ==
| Constituency | MP | Party |
| Wakefield | Joseph Holdsworth | Whig |
| Wallingford | William Seymour Blackstone | Conservative |
| Walsall | Robert Scott | Whig |
| Wareham | John Erle-Drax | Whig |
| Warrington | John Ireland Blackburne | Conservative |
| Warwick (two members) | William Collins | Whig |
| Warwick (two members) | Charles Eurwicke Douglas | Conservative |
| Warwickshire North (two members) | William Stratford Dugdale | Conservative |
| Warwickshire North (two members) | John Eardley-Wilmot | Conservative |
| Warwickshire South (two members) | John Mordaunt | Conservative |
| Warwickshire South (two members) | Evelyn Shirley | Conservative |
| Waterford City (two members) | William Christmas | Conservative |
| Waterford City (two members) | William Morris Reade | Conservative |
| County Waterford (two members) | Robert Carew | Whig |
| County Waterford (two members) | William Villiers-Stuart | Whig |
| Wells (two members) | William Hayter | Whig |
| Wells (two members) | Richard Blakemore | Conservative |
| Wenlock (two members) | George Weld-Forester | Conservative |
| Wenlock (two members) | James Milnes Gaskell | Conservative |
| Westbury | Ralph Lopes | Conservative |
| Westmeath (two members) | Benjamin Chapman | Whig |
| Westmeath (two members) | Hugh Morgan Tuite | Whig |
| Westminster (two members) | John Temple Leader | Radical |
| Westminster (two members) | Henry John Rous | Conservative |
| Westmorland (two members) | Henry Lowther | Conservative |
| Westmorland (two members) | William Thompson | Conservative |
| Wexford | Thomas Esmonde | Whig |
| County Wexford (two members) | Villiers Francis Hatton | Whig |
| County Wexford (two members) | James Power | Whig |
| Weymouth and Melcombe Regis (two members) | George William Hope | Conservative |
| Weymouth and Melcombe Regis (two members) | George Child Villiers | Conservative |
| Whitby | Aaron Chapman | Conservative |
| Whitehaven | Matthias Attwood | Conservative |
| Wick District | James Loch | Whig |
| Wicklow (two members) | Ralph Howard | Whig |
| Wicklow (two members) | William Acton | Conservative |
| Wigan (two members) | Thomas Bright Crosse | Conservative |
| Wigan (two members) | Peter Greenall | Conservative |
| Wigtown Burghs | John McTaggart | Whig |
| Wigtownshire | John Dalrymple | Whig |
| Wilton | James Harris | Conservative |
| Wiltshire North (two members) | Walter Long | Conservative |
| Wiltshire North (two members) | Francis Burdett | Conservative |
| Wiltshire South (two members) | Sidney Herbert | Conservative |
| Wiltshire South (two members) | John Benett | Whig |
| Winchester (two members) | James Buller East | Conservative |
| Winchester (two members) | Bickham Escott | Conservative |
| Windsor (two members) | Ralph Neville | Conservative |
| Windsor (two members) | John Ramsbottom | Whig |
| Wolverhampton (two members) | Charles Pelham Villiers | Radical |
| Wolverhampton (two members) | Thomas Thornely | Radical |
| Woodstock | Frederic Thesiger | Conservative |
| Worcester (two members) | Joseph Bailey | Conservative |
| Worcester (two members) | Thomas Wilde | Whig |
| Worcestershire East (two members) | John Barneby | Conservative |
| Worcestershire East (two members) | James Arthur Taylor | Conservative |
| Worcestershire West (two members) | Henry Lygon | Conservative |
| Worcestershire West (two members) | Frederick Knight | Conservative |
| Wycombe (two members) | George Dashwood | Whig |
| Wycombe (two members) | Ralph Bernal | Radical |
== Y ==
| Constituency | MP | Party |
| York (two members) | John Lowther | Conservative |
| York (two members) | Henry Redhead Yorke | Whig |
| East Riding of Yorkshire (two members) | Beaumont Hotham | Conservative |
| East Riding of Yorkshire (two members) | Henry Broadley | Conservative |
| North Riding of Yorkshire (two members) | Edward Cayley | Whig |
| North Riding of Yorkshire (two members) | William Duncombe | Conservative |
| West Riding of Yorkshire (two members) | Edmund Beckett | Conservative |
| West Riding of Yorkshire (two members) | John Stuart-Wortley | Conservative |
| Youghal | Charles Cavendish | Whig |

== See also ==
- List of parliaments of the United Kingdom
