= Henry John Adeane (born 1833) =

British politician (1833–1870)

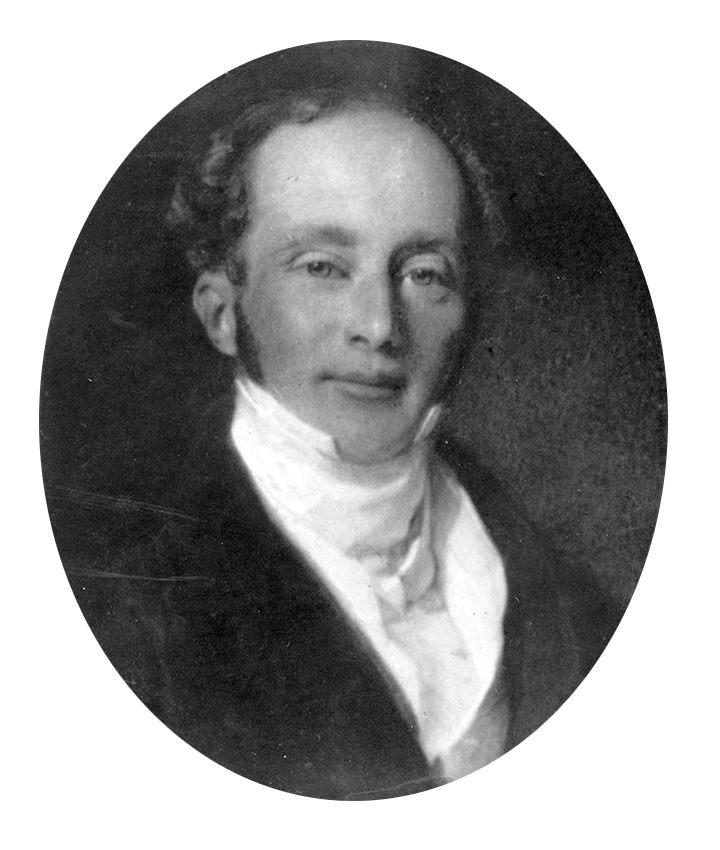

Member of Parliament for Cambridgeshire
- In office 6 April 1857 – 18 July 1865 Serving with George Manners (1863–1865); Edward Ball (1857–1863); Eliot Yorke (1857–1865)
- Preceded by: Edward Ball; Eliot Yorke; George Manners
- Succeeded by: George Manners; Charles Yorke; Richard Young

Personal details
- Born: 9 June 1833
- Died: 17 February 1870 (aged 36)
- Party: Liberal
- Other political affiliations: Whig
- Spouse: Lady Elizabeth Yorke (m. 1860)
- Children: Three, including Charles Adeane
- Parent(s): Henry John Adeane; Matilda Abigail Stanley

Henry John Adeane (9 June 1833 – 17 February 1870) was a British Liberal and Whig politician.

The son of his namesake Henry John Adeane (MP for Cambridgeshire from 1830 to 1832) and Matilda Abigail née Stanley, Adeane married Lady Elizabeth Yorke, daughter of Charles Yorke (also MP for Cambridgeshire between 1832 and 1834) and Susan née Liddell in 1860. They had at least three children: Marie Constance (died 1934); Maud (died 1943); and Charles Robert Whorwood (1863–1943). His daughter, Marie Adeane, was a Maid of Honour to Queen Victoria; she married Sir Bernard Mallet, and they had two sons, one of whom was Sir Victor Mallet, the diplomat.

Adeane followed his father into politics, and was first elected Whig MP for Cambridgeshire at the 1857 general election. Becoming a Liberal in 1859, he held the seat until 1865, when he stood down.

Outside of politics, Adeane was a Major in the Cambridgeshire Militia, a Deputy Lieutenant and a Justice of the Peace.

Parliament of the United Kingdom
Preceded by Edward Ball; Eliot Yorke; George Manners	Member of Parliament for Cambridgeshire; 1857–1865; With: George Manners (1863–1865); Edward Ball (1857–1863); Eliot Yorke (1857–1865)	Succeeded by George Manners; Charles Yorke; Richard Young
