= List of MPs elected in the 1837 United Kingdom general election =

1837–1841 Parliament of the United Kingdom
←	1835–1837 Parliament	1841–1847 Parliament	→
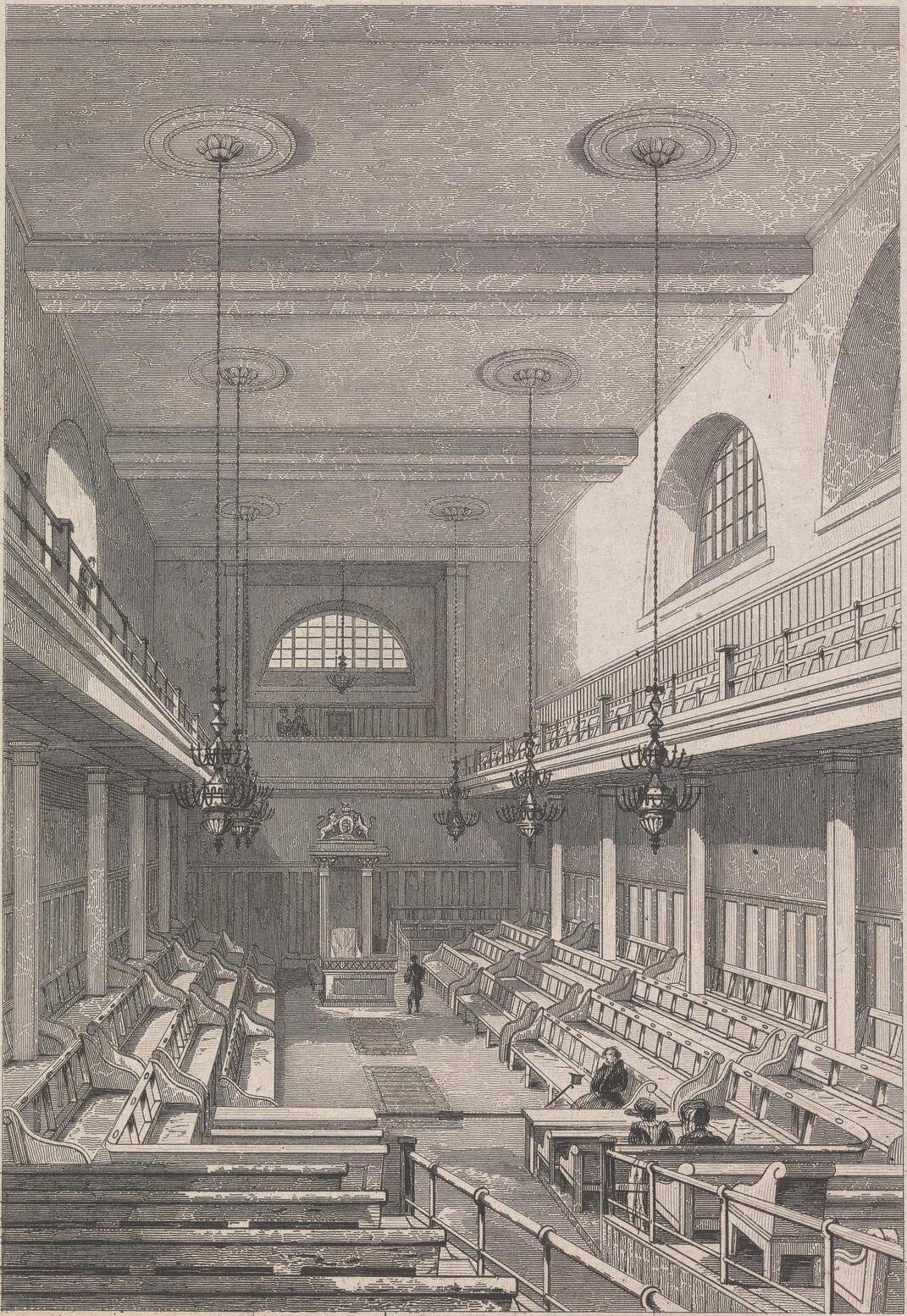
- The temporary House of Commons in 1835

Overview
- Legislative body: Parliament of the United Kingdom
- Jurisdiction: United Kingdom
- Meeting place: Palace of Westminster
- Term: 15 November 1837 – 22 June 1841
- Election: 1837 United Kingdom general election

Crown-in-Parliament Victoria

Sessions
- 1st: 15 November 1837 – 16 August 1838
- 2nd: 5 February 1839 – 27 August 1839
- 3rd: 16 January 1840 – 11 August 1840
- 4th: 26 January 1841 – 22 June 1841

This is a list of members of Parliament (MPs) elected in the 1837 general election.

== A ==
Constituency	MP	Party
Aberdeen	Alexander Bannerman	Whig
Aberdeenshire	William Gordon	Conservative
Abingdon	Thomas Duffield	Conservative
Andover	Sir John Pollen	Conservative
Andover	Ralph Etwall	Whig
Anglesey	William Owen Stanley	Whig
Antrim	John Irving	Conservative
Antrim	John O'Neill	Conservative
Argyll	Walter Frederick Campbell	Whig
Armagh City	William Curry	Whig
Armagh	Viscount Acheson	Whig
Armagh	Sir William Verner	Conservative
Arundel	Henry Fitzalan-Howard	Whig
Ashburton	Charles Lushington	Whig
Ashton-under-Lyne	Charles Hindley	Radical
Athlone	John O'Connell	Radical
Aylesbury	Winthrop Mackworth Praed	Conservative
Aylesbury	William Rickford	Whig
Ayr Burghs	Lord Patrick Crichton-Stuart	Whig
Ayrshire	John Dunlop	Radical
== B ==
Constituency	MP	Party
Banbury	Henry William Tancred	Whig
Bandon	Joseph Devonsher Jackson	Conservative
Banffshire	James Duff	Whig
Barnstaple	Sir John Chichester	Whig
Barnstaple	Frederick Hodgson	Conservative
Bath	Richard Wingfield	Conservative
Bath	William Heald Ludlow Bruges	Conservative
Beaumaris	Frederick Paget	Whig
Bedford	Henry Stuart	Conservative
Bedford	Frederick Polhill	Conservative
Bedfordshire	John Egerton	Conservative
Bedfordshire	Lord Charles Russell	Whig
Belfast	James Gibson	Whig
Belfast	George Chichester	Whig
Berkshire	Robert Palmer	Conservative
Berkshire	Philip Pusey	Conservative
Berkshire	William Barrington	Conservative
Berwickshire	Sir Hugh Purves-Hume-Campbell	Conservative
Berwick-upon-Tweed	Richard Hodgson	Conservative
Berwick-upon-Tweed	William Holmes	Conservative
Beverley	George Lane-Fox	Conservative
Beverley	Sir James Hogg	Conservative
Bewdley	Thomas Winnington	Whig
Birmingham	Thomas Attwood	Radical
Birmingham	Joshua Scholefield	Radical
Blackburn	William Feilden	Whig
Blackburn	William Turner	Whig
Bodmin	Samuel Thomas Spry	Conservative
Bodmin	Charles Vivian	Whig
Bolton	Peter Ainsworth	Whig
Bolton	William Bolling	Conservative
Boston	John Studholme Brownrigg	Conservative
Boston	James Duke	Whig
Bradford	William Busfield	Whig
Bradford	Ellis Cunliffe Lister	Whig
Brecon	Sir Charles Morgan	Conservative
Breconshire	Thomas Wood	Conservative
Bridgnorth	Henry Hanbury-Tracy	Whig
Bridgnorth	Thomas Charlton Whitmore	Conservative
Bridgwater	Henry Broadwood	Conservative
Bridgwater	Philip Courtenay|	Conservative
Bridport	Swynfen Jervis	Radical
Bridport	Henry Warburton	Radical
Brighton	George Brooke-Pechell	Whig
Brighton	Adolphus Dalrymple	Conservative
Bristol	Philip William Skinner Miles	Conservative
Bristol	Henry FitzHardinge Berkeley	Radical
Buckingham	Thomas Fremantle	Conservative
Buckingham	Sir Harry Verney	Whig
Buckinghamshire	George Simon Harcourt	Conservative
Buckinghamshire	Marquess of Chandos	Conservative
Buckinghamshire	Sir William Young	Conservative
Bury	Richard Walker	Whig
Bury St Edmunds	Lord Charles FitzRoy	Whig
Bury St Edmunds	Frederick Hervey	Conservative
Buteshire	Sir William Rae	Conservative
== C ==
Constituency	MP	Party
Caernarvon	William Bulkeley Hughes	Conservative
Caernarvonshire	John Ormsby-Gore	Conservative
Caithness-shire	Sir George Sinclair	Conservative
Calne	Henry Petty-Fitzmaurice	Whig
Cambridge	George Pryme	Whig
Cambridge	Thomas Spring Rice	Whig
Cambridge University	Henry Goulburn	Conservative
Cambridge University	Charles Law	Conservative
Cambridgeshire	Richard Jefferson Eaton	Conservative
Cambridgeshire	Richard Greaves Townley	Whig
Cambridgeshire	Eliot Yorke	Conservative
Canterbury	Lord Albert Conyngham	Whig
Canterbury	James Bradshaw	Conservative
Cardiff Boroughs	John Iltyd Nicholl	Conservative
Cardigan Boroughs	Pryse Pryse	Whig
Cardiganshire	William Edward Powell	Conservative
Carlisle	Philip Howard	Whig
Carlisle	William Marshall	Whig
Carlow	John Ashton Yates	Whig
Carlow	Nicholas Aylward Vigors	Irish Repeal (Whig)
Carlow Borough	William Henry Maule	Whig
Carmarthen Boroughs	David Morris	Whig
Carmarthenshire	John Jones	Conservative
Carmarthenshire	George Rice-Trevor	Conservative
Carrickfergus	Peter Kirk	Conservative
Cashel	Stephen Woulfe	Whig
Cavan	Henry Maxwell	Conservative
Cavan	John Young	Conservative
Chatham	George Byng	Whig
Cheltenham	Craven Berkeley	Whig
Cheshire Northern	William Egerton	Conservative
Cheshire Northern	Edward Stanley	Whig
Cheshire Southern	Sir Philip Grey Egerton	Conservative
Cheshire Southern	George Wilbraham	Whig
Chichester	Lord Arthur Lennox	Conservative
Chichester	John Abel Smith	Whig
Chippenham	Henry George Boldero	Conservative
Chippenham	Joseph Neeld	Conservative
Christchurch	George Henry Rose	Conservative
Cirencester	Joseph Cripps	Conservative
Cirencester	Thomas Chester-Master	Conservative
City of Chester	Lord Robert Grosvenor	Whig
City of Chester	Sir John Jervis	Radical
City of London	William Crawford	Whig
City of London	George Grote	Radical
City of London	James Pattison	Whig
City of London	Sir Matthew Wood	Whig
Clackmannan and Kinross Shires	Sir Charles Adam	Whig
Clare	William Nugent Macnamara	Irish Repeal (Whig)
Clare	Cornelius O'Brien	Irish Repeal (Whig)
Clitheroe	John Fort	Whig
Clonmel	Nicholas Ball	Whig
Cockermouth	Henry Aglionby Aglionby	Radical
Cockermouth	Edward Horsman	Whig
Colchester	Richard Sanderson	Conservative
Colchester	Sir George Smyth	Conservative
Coleraine	Edward Litton	Conservative
Cork City	Francis Beamish	Irish Repeal (Whig)
Cork City	Daniel Callaghan	Irish Repeal (Whig)
County Cork	Garrett Standish Barry	Irish Repeal (Whig)
County Cork	Edmond Roche	Irish Repeal (Whig)
County Dublin	George Hampden Evans	Whig
County Dublin	Lord Brabazon	Whig
County Galway	John James Bodkin	Whig
County Galway	Thomas Barnwall Martin	Whig
County Kilkenny	Pierce Butler	Irish Repeal (Whig)
County Kilkenny	George Bryan	Whig
County Limerick	Richard FitzGibbon	Whig
County Limerick	William Smith O'Brien	Whig
County Louth	Henry Chester (MP)	Whig
County Louth	Richard Bellew	Irish Repeal (Whig)
County Sligo	Edward Joshua Cooper	Conservative
County Sligo	Alexander Perceval	Conservative
County Waterford	William Villiers-Stuart	Whig
County Waterford	John Power (Irish MP)	Whig
County Wexford	John Maher	Irish Repeal (Whig)
County Wexford	Sir James Power	Irish Repeal (Whig)
Coventry	Edward Ellice	Whig
Coventry	William Williams	Radical
Cricklade	Ambrose Goddard (born 1779)	Conservative
Cricklade	Sir John Neeld	Conservative
== D ==
Constituency	MP	Party
Dartmouth	Sir John Henry Seale	Whig
Denbigh Boroughs	Wilson Jones	Conservative
Denbighshire	William Bagot	Conservative
Denbighshire	Sir Watkin Williams-Wynn	Conservative
Derby	John Ponsonby	Whig
Derby	Edward Strutt	Whig
Devizes	T. H. S. Bucknall-Estcourt	Conservative
Devizes	James Whitley Deans Dundas	Whig
Devonport	Sir Edward Codrington	Whig
Devonport	Sir George Grey	Whig
Donegal	Edward Michael Conolly	Conservative
Donegal	Sir Edmund Samuel Hayes	Conservative
Dorchester	Henry Ashley-Cooper	Conservative
Dorchester	Robert Williams	Conservative
Dorset	Lord Ashley	Conservative
Dorset	John Fox-Strangways	Whig
Dorset	Henry Sturt	Conservative
Dover	Edward Royd Rice	Whig
Dover	Sir John Reid	Conservative
Down	Lord Arthur Hill	Conservative
Down	Viscount Castlereagh	Conservative
Downpatrick	David Guardi Ker	Conservative
Drogheda	William Somerville	Whig
Droitwich	John Pakington	Conservative
Dublin City	Daniel O'Connell (Note: On petition, George Alexander Hamilton and John Beattie West (Conservative) were declared elected in place of O'Connell and Ruthven.)	Irish Repeal (Whig)
Dublin City	Robert Hutton	Whig
Dublin University	Thomas Langlois Lefroy	Conservative
Dublin University	Sir Frederick Shaw	Conservative
Dudley	Thomas Hawkes	Conservative
Dumfries District	Matthew Sharpe	Whig
Dumfriesshire	John Hope-Johnstone	Conservative
Dunbartonshire	James Colquhoun	Whig
Dundalk	Thomas Nicholas Redington	Whig
Dundee	Sir Henry Parnell	Whig
Dungannon	Thomas Knox	Conservative
Dungarvan	Michael O'Loghlen	Whig
Durham	Arthur Hill-Trevor	Conservative
Durham	William Charles Harland	Whig
Durham North	Hedworth Lambton	Whig
Durham North	Henry Liddell	Conservative
Durham South	Joseph Pease	Whig
Durham South	John Bowes	Whig
== E ==
Constituency	MP	Party
East Cornwall	Edward Eliot	Conservative
East Cornwall	Hussey Vivian	Whig
East Cumberland	Francis Aglionby	Radical
East Cumberland	William James	Radical
East Gloucestershire	Sir Christopher William Codrington	Conservative
East Gloucestershire	Augustus Moreton	Whig
East Kent	Sir Edward Knatchbull	Conservative
East Kent	John Pemberton Plumptre	Conservative
East Norfolk	Henry Negus Burroughes	Conservative
East Norfolk	Edmond Wodehouse	Conservative
East Retford	Arthur Duncombe	Conservative
East Retford	Granville Harcourt-Vernon	Conservative
East Riding of Yorkshire	Richard Bethell	Conservative
East Riding of Yorkshire	Henry Broadley	Conservative
East Somerset	William Gore-Langton	Whig
East Somerset	Sir William Miles	Conservative
East Suffolk	John Henniker-Major	Conservative
East Suffolk	Sir Charles Broke Vere	Conservative
East Surrey	Richard Alsager	Conservative
East Surrey	Henry Kemble	Conservative
East Sussex	Charles Cavendish	Whig
East Sussex	George Darby	Conservative
East Worcestershire	Sir Horace St Paul, 2nd Baronet	Conservative
East Worcestershire	John Barneby	Conservative
Edinburgh	James Abercromby	Whig
Edinburgh	John Campbell	Whig
Elgin Burghs	Andrew Leith Hay	Whig
Elginshire and Nairnshire	Francis Ogilvy-Grant	Conservative
Ennis	Hewitt Bridgeman	Radical
Enniskillen	Arthur Henry Cole	Conservative
Evesham	Peter Borthwick	Conservative
Evesham	Sir Charles Cockerell	Conservative
Exeter	Edward Divett	Radical
Exeter	Sir William Webb Follett	Conservative
Eye	Sir Edward Kerrison	Conservative
== F ==
Constituency	MP	Party
Falkirk Burghs	William Downe Gillon	Radical
Fermanagh	Mervyn Edward Archdale	Conservative
Fermanagh	Viscount Cole	Conservative
Fife	James Erskine Wemyss	Whig
Finsbury	Thomas Slingsby Duncombe	Radical
Finsbury	Thomas Wakley	Radical
Flint Boroughs	Charles Whitley Deans Dundas	Whig
Flintshire	Stephen Glynne	Conservative
Forfarshire	Lord Douglas Gordon-Hallyburton	Whig
Frome	Thomas Sheppard	Conservative
== G ==
Constituency	MP	Party
Galway Borough	Martin Joseph Blake	Irish Repeal (Whig)
Galway Borough	Andrew Henry Lynch	Irish Repeal (Whig)
Gateshead	Cuthbert Rippon	Radical
Glamorganshire	Edward Wyndham-Quin	Conservative
Glamorganshire	Christopher Rice Mansel Talbot	Whig
Glasgow	William Cavendish-Bentinck	Whig
Glasgow	John Dennistoun	Whig
Gloucester	John Phillpotts	Whig
Gloucester	Henry Thomas Hope	Conservative
Grantham	Algernon Tollemache	Conservative
Grantham	Sir Glynne Welby	Conservative
Great Marlow	Sir William Clayton	Whig
Great Marlow	Thomas Peers Williams	Conservative
Great Yarmouth	Charles Rumbold	Whig
Great Yarmouth	William Wilshere	Whig
Greenock	Robert Wallace	Whig
Greenwich	Matthias Wolverley Attwood	Conservative
Greenwich	Edward George Barnard	Radical
Grimsby	Edward Heneage	Whig
Guildford	James Yorke Scarlett	Conservative
Guildford	Charles Baring Wall	Conservative
== H ==
Constituency	MP	Party
Haddington Burghs	Robert Steuart	Whig
Haddingtonshire	James Broun-Ramsay	Conservative
Halifax	Edward Davis Protheroe	Radical
Halifax	Charles Wood	Whig
Harwich	Alexander Ellice	Whig
Harwich	John Charles Herries	Conservative
Hastings	Robert Hollond	Radical
Hastings	Joseph Planta	Conservative
Haverfordwest	Richard Philipps	Whig
Helston	George West	Conservative
Hereford	Daniel Higford Davall Burr	Conservative
Hereford	Edward Clive	Whig
Herefordshire	Edward Thomas Foley	Conservative
Herefordshire	Kedgwin Hoskins	Whig
Herefordshire	Sir Robert Price	Whig
Hertford	William Cowper	Whig
Hertford	Viscount Mahon	Conservative
Hertfordshire	Rowland Alston	Whig
Hertfordshire	Viscount Grimston	Conservative
Hertfordshire	Abel Smith	Conservative
Honiton	Hugh Duncan Baillie	Conservative
Honiton	James Stewart	Whig
Horsham	Robert Henry Hurst	Radical
Huddersfield	William Crompton-Stansfield	Whig
Huntingdon	Jonathan Peel	Conservative
Huntingdon	Sir Frederick Pollock	Conservative
Huntingdonshire	George Thornhill	Conservative
Huntingdonshire	Edward Fellowes	Conservative
Hythe	William Elliot-Murray-Kynynmound	Whig
== I ==
Constituency	MP	Party
Inverness Burghs	Roderick Macleod	Whig
Inverness-shire	Alexander William Chisholm	Conservative
Ipswich	Thomas Milner Gibson	Conservative
Ipswich	Henry Tufnell	Whig
Isle of Wight	William à Court-Holmes	Conservative
== K ==
Constituency	MP	Party
Kendal	George William Wood	Whig
Kerry	Arthur Blennerhassett	Conservative
Kerry	Morgan O'Connell	Irish Repeal (Whig)
Kidderminster	Richard Godson	Conservative
Kildare	Richard More O'Ferrall	Whig
Kildare	Robert Archbold	Whig
Kilkenny City	Joseph Hume	Radical
Kilmarnock Burghs	John Campbell Colquhoun	Conservative
Kincardineshire	Hugh Arbuthnot	Conservative
King's County	Nicholas Fitzsimon	Irish Repeal (Whig)
King's County	John Westenra	Whig
King's Lynn	Lord George Bentinck	Conservative
King's Lynn	Stratford Canning	Conservative
Kingston upon Hull	William Wilberforce	Conservative
Kingston upon Hull	Walter James	Conservative
Kinsale	Pierce Mahony	Whig
Kirkcaldy Burghs	Robert Ferguson	Whig
Kirkcudbrightshire	Robert Cutlar Fergusson	Whig
Knaresborough	Henry Rich	Whig
Knaresborough	Charles Langdale	Whig
== L ==
Constituency	MP	Party
Lambeth	Charles Tennyson-d'Eyncourt	Whig
Lambeth	Sir Benjamin Hawes	Whig
Lanarkshire	Alexander Lockhart	Conservative
Lancaster	Thomas Greene	Conservative
Lancaster	George Marton	Conservative
Launceston	Henry Hardinge	Conservative
Leeds	Edward Baines	Whig
Leeds	William Molesworth	Radical
Leicester	Samuel Duckworth	Radical
Leicester	John Easthope	Radical
Leith Burghs	John Murray	Whig
Leitrim	Viscount Clements	Whig
Leitrim	Samuel White	Whig
Leominster	Charles Greenaway	Whig
Leominster	Beaumont Hotham	Conservative
Lewes	Sir Charles Blunt	Whig
Lewes	Henry FitzRoy	Conservative
Lichfield	Sir George Anson	Whig
Lichfield	Alfred Paget	Whig
Limerick City	Sir David Roche	Irish Repeal (Whig)
Limerick City	William Roche	Irish Repeal (Whig)
Lincoln	Edward Bulwer-Lytton	Whig
Lincoln	Charles Sibthorp	Conservative
Linlithgowshire	James Hope	Conservative
Lisburn	Henry Meynell	Conservative
Liskeard	Charles Buller	Radical
Liverpool	Cresswell Cresswell	Conservative
Liverpool	Viscount Sandon	Conservative
Londonderry	Sir Robert Bateson	Conservative
Londonderry	Theobald Jones	Conservative
Londonderry City	Robert Ferguson	Whig
Longford	Luke White	Irish Repeal (Whig)
Longford	Henry White	Irish Repeal (Whig)
Ludlow	Viscount Clive	Conservative
Ludlow	Henry Salwey	Whig
Lyme Regis	William Pinney	Whig
Lymington	William Alexander Mackinnon	Conservative
Lymington	John Stewart	Conservative
== M ==
Constituency	MP	Party
Macclesfield	John Brocklehurst	Whig
Macclesfield	Thomas Grimsditch	Conservative
Maidstone	Wyndham Lewis	Conservative
Maidstone	Benjamin Disraeli	Conservative
Maldon	John Round	Conservative
Maldon	Quintin Dick	Conservative
Mallow	Sir Denham Jephson	Whig
Malmesbury	James Howard	Whig
Malton	John Walbanke-Childers	Whig
Malton	William Wentworth-Fitzwilliam	Whig
Manchester	Mark Philips	Whig
Manchester	Charles Poulett Thomson	Whig
Marlborough	Henry Bingham Baring	Conservative
Marlborough	Lord Ernest Bruce	Conservative
Marylebone	Benjamin Hall	Whig
Marylebone	Sir Samuel Whalley	Radical
Mayo	Sir William Brabazon	Irish Repeal (Whig)
Mayo	Robert Dillon Browne	Irish Repeal (Whig)
Meath	Henry Grattan	Irish Repeal (Whig)
Meath	Morgan O'Connell	Irish Repeal (Whig)
Merioneth	Richard Richards	Conservative
Merthyr Tydfil	John Josiah Guest	Whig
Middlesex	George Byng	Whig
Middlesex	Thomas Wood	Conservative
Midhurst	William Stephen Poyntz	Whig
Midlothian	William Gibson-Craig	Whig
Monaghan	Edward Lucas	Conservative
Monaghan	Henry Westenra	Whig
Monmouth Boroughs	Reginald Blewitt	Whig
Monmouthshire	Lord Granville Somerset	Conservative
Monmouthshire	William Addams Williams	Whig
Montgomery Boroughs	Sir John Edwards	Whig
Montgomeryshire	Charles Williams-Wynn	Conservative
Montrose Burghs	Patrick Chalmers	Radical
Morpeth	Granville Leveson-Gower	Whig
== N ==
Constituency	MP	Party
Newark	William Ewart Gladstone	Conservative
Newark	Thomas Wilde	Whig
Newcastle-under-Lyme	William Henry Miller	Conservative
Newcastle-under-Lyme	Spencer Horsey de Horsey	Conservative
Newcastle-upon-Tyne	William Ord	Whig
Newcastle-upon-Tyne	John Hodgson-Hinde	Conservative
Newport	John Heywood Hawkins	Whig
Newport	William John Blake	Whig
New Ross	John Hyacinth Talbot	Irish Repeal (Whig)
Newry	John Ellis	Conservative
New Shoreham	Sir Charles Burrell	Conservative
New Shoreham	Sir Harry Goring	Whig
Northallerton	William Battie-Wrightson	Whig
Northampton	Raikes Currie	Radical
Northampton	Robert Vernon Smith	Whig
North Derbyshire	Lord George Cavendish	Whig
North Derbyshire	William Evans	Whig
North Devon	Thomas Dyke Acland	Conservative
North Devon	Viscount Ebrington	Whig
North Essex	Charles Gray Round	Conservative
North Essex	Sir John Tyrell	Conservative
North Hampshire	William Heathcote	Conservative
North Hampshire	Charles Shaw-Lefevre	Whig
North Lancashire	Lord Stanley	Conservative
North Lancashire	John Wilson-Patten	Conservative
North Leicestershire	Charles Manners Sr.	Conservative
North Leicestershire	Edward Basil Farnham	Conservative
North Lincolnshire	Charles Anderson-Pelham	Whig
North Lincolnshire	Robert Christopher	Conservative
North Northamptonshire	Thomas Philip Maunsell	Conservative
North Northamptonshire	George Finch-Hatton	Conservative
North Northumberland	Lord Ossulston	Conservative
North Northumberland	Viscount Howick	Whig
North Nottinghamshire	Thomas Houldsworth	Conservative
North Nottinghamshire	Henry Gally Knight	Conservative
North Riding of Yorkshire	Edward Cayley	Whig
North Riding of Yorkshire	William Duncombe	Conservative
North Shropshire	Sir Rowland Hill	Conservative
North Shropshire	William Ormsby-Gore	Conservative
North Staffordshire	Edward Manningham-Buller	Whig
North Staffordshire	Bingham Baring	Conservative
North Warwickshire	William Stratford Dugdale	Conservative
North Warwickshire	Sir John Eardley-Wilmot	Conservative
North Wiltshire	Walter Long	Conservative
North Wiltshire	Francis Burdett	Conservative
Norwich	Arthur Wellesley	Conservative
Norwich	Robert Scarlett	Conservative
Nottingham	Sir Ronald Craufurd Ferguson	Whig
Nottingham	Sir John Hobhouse	Radical
== O ==
Constituency	MP	Party
Oldham	William Augustus Johnson	Radical
Oldham	John Fielden	Radical
Orkney and Shetland	Frederick Dundas	Whig
Oxford	William Erle	Whig
Oxford	Donald Maclean	Conservative
Oxfordshire	Lord Norreys	Conservative
Oxfordshire	George Harcourt	Conservative
Oxfordshire	Thomas Parker	Conservative
Oxford University	Thomas Grimston Estcourt	Conservative
Oxford University	Sir Robert Inglis	Conservative
== P ==
Constituency	MP	Party
Paisley	Archibald Hastie	Radical
Peeblesshire	William Forbes Mackenzie	Conservative
Pembroke	Sir Hugh Owen Owen	Conservative
Pembrokeshire	Sir John Owen	Conservative
Penryn and Falmouth	James William Freshfield	Conservative
Penryn and Falmouth	Robert Rolfe	Whig
Perth	Arthur Kinnaird	Whig
Perthshire	William Murray	Conservative
Peterborough	John Nicholas Fazakerley	Whig
Peterborough	Sir Robert Heron	Whig
Petersfield	William Jolliffe	Conservative
Plymouth	Thomas Bewes	Whig
Plymouth	John Collier	Whig
Pontefract	Sir William Stanley-Massey-Stanley, 10th Baronet	Whig
Pontefract	Richard Monckton Milnes	Conservative
Poole	George Philips	Whig
Poole	Charles Ponsonby	Whig
Portarlington	George Dawson-Damer	Conservative
Portsmouth	Francis Baring	Whig
Portsmouth	John Bonham-Carter	Whig
Preston	Sir Peter Hesketh-Fleetwood	Whig
Preston	Robert Townley Parker	Conservative
== Q ==
Constituency	MP	Party
Queen's County	Sir Charles Coote	Conservative
Queen's County	John FitzPatrick	Whig
== R ==
Constituency	MP	Party
Radnor	Richard Price	Conservative
Radnorshire	Walter Wilkins	Whig
Reading	Charles Fyshe Palmer	Whig
Reading	Thomas Talfourd	Radical
Reigate	Viscount Eastnor	Conservative
Renfrewshire	George Houstoun	Conservative
Richmond	Thomas Dundas	Whig
Richmond	Alexander Speirs	Whig
Ripon	Edward Sugden	Conservative
Ripon	Thomas Pemberton Leigh	Conservative
Rochdale	John Fenton (MP for Rochdale)	Whig
Rochester	Ralph Bernal	Whig
Rochester	Thomas Hobhouse	Radical
Roscommon	Fitzstephen French	Whig
Roscommon	Denis O'Conor	Irish Repeal (Whig)
Ross and Cromarty Shire	Thomas Mackenzie	Conservative
Roxburghshire	John Elliot	Whig
Rutland	Sir Gilbert Heathcote	Whig
Rutland	Sir Gerard Noel	Conservative
Rye	Thomas Gybbon Monypenny	Conservative
== S ==
Constituency	MP	Party
St Albans	Edward Grimston	Conservative
St Albans	George Alfred Muskett	Whig
St Andrews Burghs	Edward Ellice	Whig
St Ives	James Halse	Conservative
Salford	Joseph Brotherton	Radical
Salisbury	William Bird Brodie	Whig
Salisbury	Wadham Penruddock Wyndham	Conservative
Sandwich	James Rivett-Carnac	Whig
Sandwich	Sir Edward Troubridge	Whig
Scarborough	Sir Frederick Trench	Conservative
Scarborough	Sir Thomas Style, 8th Baronet	Whig
Selkirkshire	Alexander Pringle	Conservative
Shaftesbury	John Sayer Poulter	Whig
Sheffield	Henry George Ward	Radical
Sheffield	John Parker	Whig
Shrewsbury	Robert Aglionby Slaney	Whig
Shrewsbury	Richard Jenkins	Conservative
Sligo	John Patrick Somers	Whig
Southampton	Abel Rous Dottin	Conservative
Southampton	Adam Haldane-Duncan	Whig
South Derbyshire	Sir George Harpur Crewe	Conservative
South Derbyshire	Francis Hurt	Conservative
South Devon	Montague Parker	Conservative
South Devon	John Yarde-Buller	Conservative
South Essex	Thomas William Bramston	Conservative
South Essex	George Palmer	Conservative
South Hampshire	Henry Combe Compton	Conservative
South Hampshire	John Willis Fleming	Conservative
South Lancashire	Richard Bootle-Wilbraham	Conservative
South Lancashire	Francis Egerton	Conservative
South Leicestershire	Sir Henry Halford	Conservative
South Leicestershire	Charles Packe	Conservative
South Lincolnshire	Henry Handley	Whig
South Lincolnshire	Gilbert Heathcote	Whig
South Northamptonshire	William Ralph Cartwright	Conservative
South Northamptonshire	Sir Charles Knightley	Conservative
South Northumberland	Christopher Blackett	Whig
South Northumberland	Matthew Bell	Conservative
South Nottinghamshire	Lancelot Rolleston	Conservative
South Nottinghamshire	Earl of Lincoln	Conservative
South Shields	Robert Ingham	Conservative
South Shropshire	Robert Clive	Conservative
South Shropshire	Henry Vane	Conservative
South Staffordshire	George Anson	Whig
South Staffordshire	Henry Chetwynd-Talbot	Conservative
South Warwickshire	John Mordaunt	Conservative
South Warwickshire	Evelyn Shirley	Conservative
South Wiltshire	Sidney Herbert	Conservative
South Wiltshire	John Benett	Whig
Southwark	Daniel Whittle Harvey	Radical
Southwark	John Humphery	Whig
Stafford	William Fawkener Chetwynd	Whig
Stafford	Robert Farrand	Conservative
Stamford	Thomas Chaplin	Conservative
Stamford	Charles Manners	Conservative
Stirling Burghs	Archibald Primrose	Whig
Stirlingshire	William Forbes	Conservative
Stockport	Henry Marsland	Radical
Stockport	Thomas Marsland	Conservative
Stoke-upon-Trent	John Davenport	Conservative
Stoke-upon-Trent	William Taylor Copeland	Conservative
Stroud	John Russell	Whig
Stroud	George Julius Poulett Scrope	Whig
Sudbury	Edward Barnes	Conservative
Sudbury	James Hamilton	Conservative
Sunderland	Andrew White	Whig
Sunderland	William Thompson	Conservative
Sutherland	William Howard	Conservative
Swansea District	John Henry Vivian	Whig
== T ==
Constituency	MP	Party
Tamworth	Sir Robert Peel	Conservative
Tamworth	Edward Henry à Court	Conservative
Taunton	Edward Thomas Bainbridge	Whig
Taunton	Henry Labouchere	Whig
Tavistock	John Rundle	Whig
Tavistock	William Russell	Whig
Tewkesbury	William Dowdeswell	Conservative
Tewkesbury	John Martin	Whig
Thetford	Francis Baring	Conservative
Thetford	Earl of Euston	Whig
Thirsk	Sir Samuel Crompton	Whig
Tipperary	Robert Otway-Cave	Whig
Tipperary	Richard Lalor Sheil	Irish Repeal (Whig)
Tiverton	John Heathcoat	Whig
Tiverton	Viscount Palmerston	Whig
Totnes	Lord Seymour	Whig
Totnes	Jasper Parrott	Whig
Tower Hamlets	Sir William Clay	Radical
Tower Hamlets	Stephen Lushington	Whig
Tralee	John Bateman	Conservative
Truro	Edmund Turner	Whig
Truro	John Ennis Vivian	Conservative
Tynemouth and North Shields	George Frederick Young	Whig
Tyrone	James Alexander	Conservative
Tyrone	Henry Lowry-Corry	Conservative
== W ==
Constituency	MP	Party
Wakefield	William Lascelles	Conservative
Wallingford	William Seymour Blackstone	Conservative
Walsall	Francis Finch	Radical
Wareham	John Hales Calcraft	Conservative
Warrington	John Ireland Blackburne	Conservative
Warwick	William Collins	Whig
Warwick	Charles Eurwicke Douglas	Conservative
Waterford City	Sir Henry Barron	Irish Repeal (Whig)
Waterford City	Sir Thomas Wyse	Whig
Wells	William Hayter	Whig
Wells	Richard Blakemore	Conservative
Wenlock	James Milnes Gaskell	Conservative
Wenlock	George Weld-Forester	Conservative
Westbury	John Ivatt Briscoe	Whig
West Cornwall	Sir Charles Lemon	Whig
West Cornwall	Edward Wynne-Pendarves	Whig
West Cumberland	Samuel Irton	Conservative
West Cumberland	Edward Stanley	Conservative
West Gloucestershire	Grantley Berkeley	Whig
West Gloucestershire	Robert Blagden Hale	Conservative
West Kent	Sir William Geary	Conservative
West Kent	Thomas Law Hodges	Whig
Westmeath	Sir Montagu Chapman	Whig
Westmeath	Sir Richard Nagle	Irish Repeal (Whig)
Westminster	John Temple Leader	Radical
Westminster	Sir George de Lacy Evans	Radical
Westmorland	Henry Lowther	Conservative
Westmorland	Viscount Lowther	Conservative
West Norfolk	William Bagge	Conservative
West Norfolk	William Lyde Wiggett Chute	Conservative
West Riding of Yorkshire	Viscount Morpeth	Whig
West Riding of Yorkshire	Sir George Strickland	Whig
West Somerset	Thomas Dyke Acland	Conservative
West Somerset	Edward Ayshford Sanford	Whig
West Suffolk	Robert Rushbrooke	Conservative
West Suffolk	Robert Hart Logan	Conservative
West Surrey	George Perceval	Conservative
West Surrey	William Joseph Denison	Whig
West Sussex	Earl of Surrey	Whig
West Sussex	Lord John Lennox	Whig
West Worcestershire	Henry Lygon	Conservative
West Worcestershire	Henry Winnington	Whig
Wexford	Charles Arthur Walker	Irish Repeal (Whig)
Weymouth and Melcombe Regis	George Child Villiers	Conservative
Weymouth and Melcombe Regis	George William Hope	Conservative
Whitby	Aaron Chapman	Conservative
Whitehaven	Matthias Attwood	Conservative
Wick Burghs	James Loch	Whig
Wicklow	James Grattan	Whig
Wicklow	Sir Ralph Howard	Whig
Wigan	Charles Strickland Standish	Whig
Wigan	Richard Potter	Radical
Wigtown Burghs	Sir John McTaggart	Whig
Wigtownshire	James Blair	Conservative
Wilton	Edward Baker	Conservative
Winchester	Paulet St John-Mildmay	Whig
Winchester	Sir James Buller East	Conservative
Windsor	Robert Gordon	Whig
Windsor	John Ramsbottom	Whig
Wolverhampton	Thomas Thornely	Radical
Wolverhampton	Charles Pelham Villiers	Radical
Woodstock	Henry Peyton	Conservative
Worcester	Sir Joseph Bailey	Conservative
Worcester	Thomas Henry Hastings Davies	Whig
Wycombe	Robert Smith	Whig
Wycombe	George Dashwood	Whig
== Y ==
Constituency	MP	Party
York	John Dundas	Whig
York	Sir John Lowther	Conservative
Youghal	Frederick John Howard	Whig

== See also ==
- List of parliaments of the United Kingdom
