= Richard Greaves Townley =

English Whig politician

Richard Greaves Townley (20 July 1786 – 5 May 1855) was an English Whig politician.

He was elected at a by-election in November 1831 as a Member of Parliament (MP) for Cambridgeshire, and held the seat until his defeat at the 1835 general election.

He did not contest the 1841 general election, but regained the seat at the 1847 general election and held it until he stood down at the 1852 general election.

Parliament of the United Kingdom
Preceded by Lord Francis Osborne; Henry John Adeane	Member of Parliament for Cambridgeshire; 1831–1835; With: Henry John Adeane 1830–1832; Charles Yorke 1832–1835; John Walbanke-Childers 1832–1835; Eliot Yorke 1835–1865; Richard Jefferson Eaton 1835–1847	Succeeded by John Allix; Eliot Yorke; Richard Jefferson Eaton
Preceded by John Allix; Eliot Yorke; Lord George Manners	Member of Parliament for Cambridgeshire; 1847–1852; With: Eliot Yorke 1835–1865; Lord George Manners 1847–1857	Succeeded by Edward Ball; Lord George Manners; Eliot Yorke
