= John Walbanke-Childers =

British politician

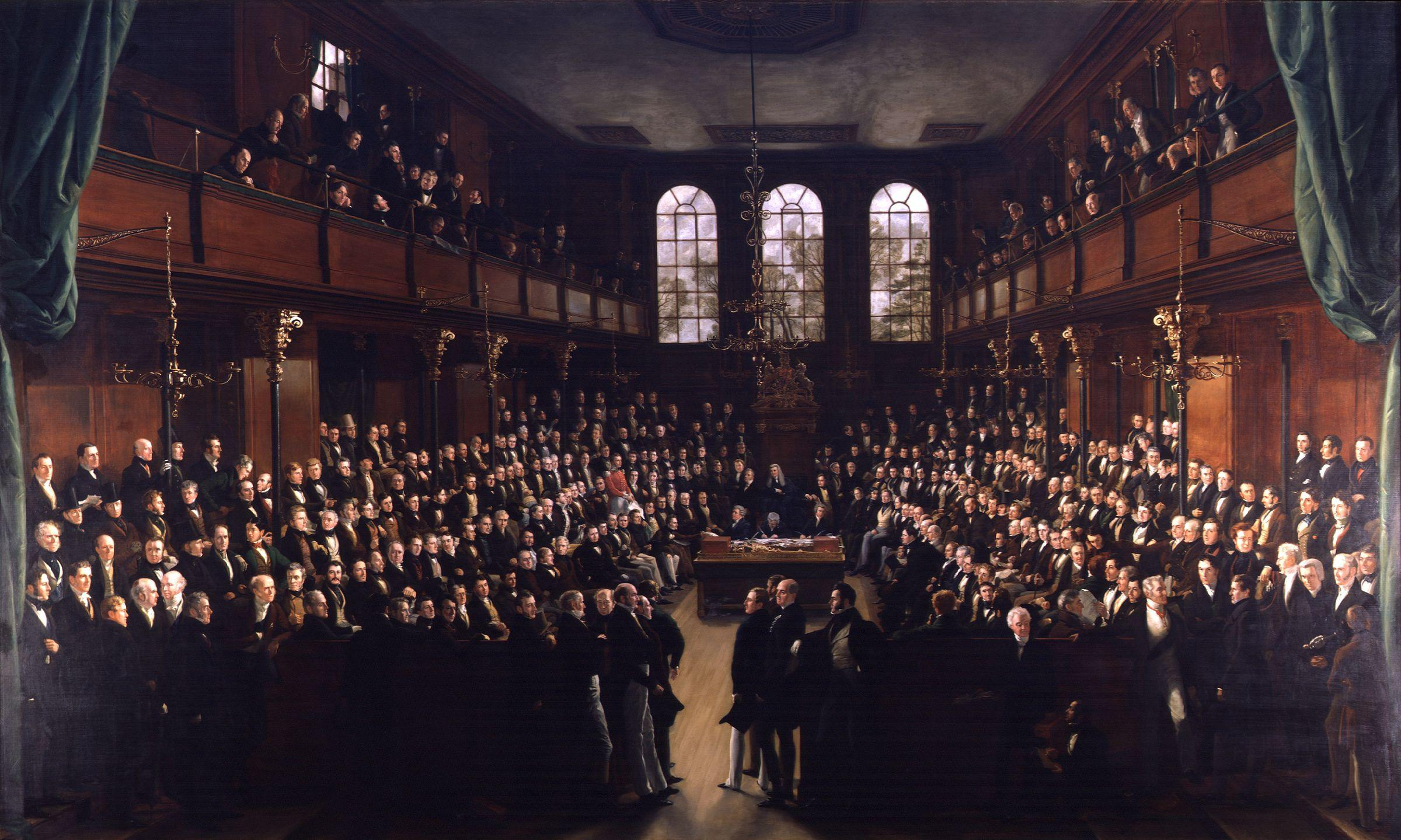
- John Walbanke-Childers

Member of Parliament for Malton
- In office 28 July 1847 – 8 July 1852 Serving with Evelyn Denison
- Preceded by: Evelyn Denison; William Wentworth-Fitzwilliam
- Succeeded by: Evelyn Denison; Charles Wentworth-FitzWilliam
- In office 12 February 1836 – 15 April 1846 Serving with: Evelyn Denison (1841–1846); William Wentworth-Fitzwilliam (1837–1841); John Charles Ramsden (1836–1837)
- Preceded by: John Charles Ramsden; Charles Pepys
- Succeeded by: Evelyn Denison; William Wentworth-Fitzwilliam

Member of Parliament for Cambridgeshire
- In office 21 December 1832 – 19 January 1835 Serving with Charles Yorke
- Preceded by: Henry John Adeane; Richard Greaves Townley
- Succeeded by: Richard Greaves Townley

Personal details
- Born: 27 May 1798
- Died: 8 February 1886 (aged 87)
- Party: Whig
- Spouse(s): Selena Radford (m. 1866) Anne Wood (m. 1824; died 1863)
- Education: Christ Church, Oxford; Eton College

John Walbanke-Childers (27 May 1798 – 8 February 1886) was a British Whig politician.

== Family and early life ==
Walkbanke-Childers was the son of Colonel John Walbanke-Childers (died 1812) and Selena née Gideon (born 1772). He was first educated at Eton College, and then graduated from Christ Church, Oxford, in 1834 with a Master of Arts. In 1824, he married Anne Wood, daughter of Sir Francis Wood, 2nd Baronet, and Anne née Buck; they had at least five children:

- Charlotte Anne Walbanke-Childers
- Leonard John Walbanke-Childers (1826–1837)
- Hugh Walbanke-Childers (1827–1828)
- Rowland Francis Walbanke-Childers (1830–1855)
- Lucy Walbanke-Childers (c. 1836–1870)

After Anne's death in 1863, he remarried in 1866 to his second cousin, Selena Radford, daughter of Edward Radford and Eliza Diana Walbanke-Childers.

== Member of Parliament ==
Walbanke-Childers was elected a Whig Member of Parliament for Cambridgeshire at the 1832 general election and held the seat until 1835, when he was defeated, ranking last out of four candidates in the poll. He returned to Parliament for Malton at a by-election in 1836—caused by the appointment of Charles Pepys, 1st Earl of Cottenham, as Lord Chancellor, in the process being elevated to the peerage—and held the seat until 1846, when he resigned by accepting the office of Steward of the Chiltern Hundreds. However, the next year, he returned to the same seat at the 1847 general election and held the seat until 1852 when he did not seek re-election.

== Other roles ==
Walbanke-Childers was also High Sheriff of Yorkshire for 1858–1859, a Deputy Lieutenant of Cambridgeshire and West Riding of Yorkshire, and a Justice of the Peace for the latter county.

Parliament of the United Kingdom
| Preceded by Henry John Adeane; Richard Greaves Townley | Member of Parliament for Cambridgeshire; 1832–1835; With: Richard Greaves Townley; Charles Yorke | Succeeded by Richard Greaves Townley; Eliot Yorke; Richard Jefferson Eaton |
| Preceded by John Charles Ramsden; Charles Pepys | Member of Parliament for Malton; 1836–1846; With: Evelyn Denison (1841–1846); William Wentworth-Fitzwilliam (1837–1841); John Charles Ramsden (1836–1837) | Succeeded by Evelyn Denison; William Wentworth-Fitzwilliam |
| Preceded by Evelyn Denison; William Wentworth-Fitzwilliam | Member of Parliament for Malton; 1847–1852; With: Evelyn Denison | Succeeded by Evelyn Denison; Charles Wentworth-FitzWilliam |
