= Charles Yorke, 5th Earl of Hardwicke =

British aristocrat, politician, and bankrupt

The Right Honourable The Earl of Hardwicke PC, DL
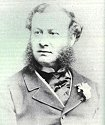

Master of the Buckhounds
- In office 2 March 1874 – 21 April 1880
- Monarch: Victoria
- Prime Minister: Benjamin Disraeli
- Preceded by: The Earl of Cork
- Succeeded by: The Earl of Cork

Personal details
- Born: 23 April 1836
- Died: 18 May 1897 (aged 61)
- Party: Conservative
- Spouse: Lady Sophia Wellesley (1840–1923)
- Education: Harrow School
- Alma mater: Trinity College, Cambridge

Charles Philip Yorke, 5th Earl of Hardwicke, PC, DL (23 April 1836 – 18 May 1897), styled Viscount Royston until 1873, was a British aristocrat, Conservative politician and dandy.

== Background ==
Hardwicke was the eldest son of Admiral Charles Yorke, 4th Earl of Hardwicke, and the Hon. Susan, daughter of Thomas Liddell, 1st Baron Ravensworth. Elliot Yorke was his younger brother.

== Cambridge ==
While studying at Trinity College, Cambridge, Hardwicke played first-class cricket on four occasions for Cambridge University Cricket Club in 1856 and 1857. He was also a Freemason, initiated into Lodge of Himalayan Brotherhood No. 459 and was appointed Provincial Grand Master of Cambridgeshire in 1872.

== Political career ==
Hardwicke was returned to Parliament for Cambridgeshire in 1865 (succeeding his uncle Eliot Yorke) and served under the Earl of Derby and Benjamin Disraeli as Comptroller of the Household between 1866 and 1868. He was sworn of the Privy Council in 1866.

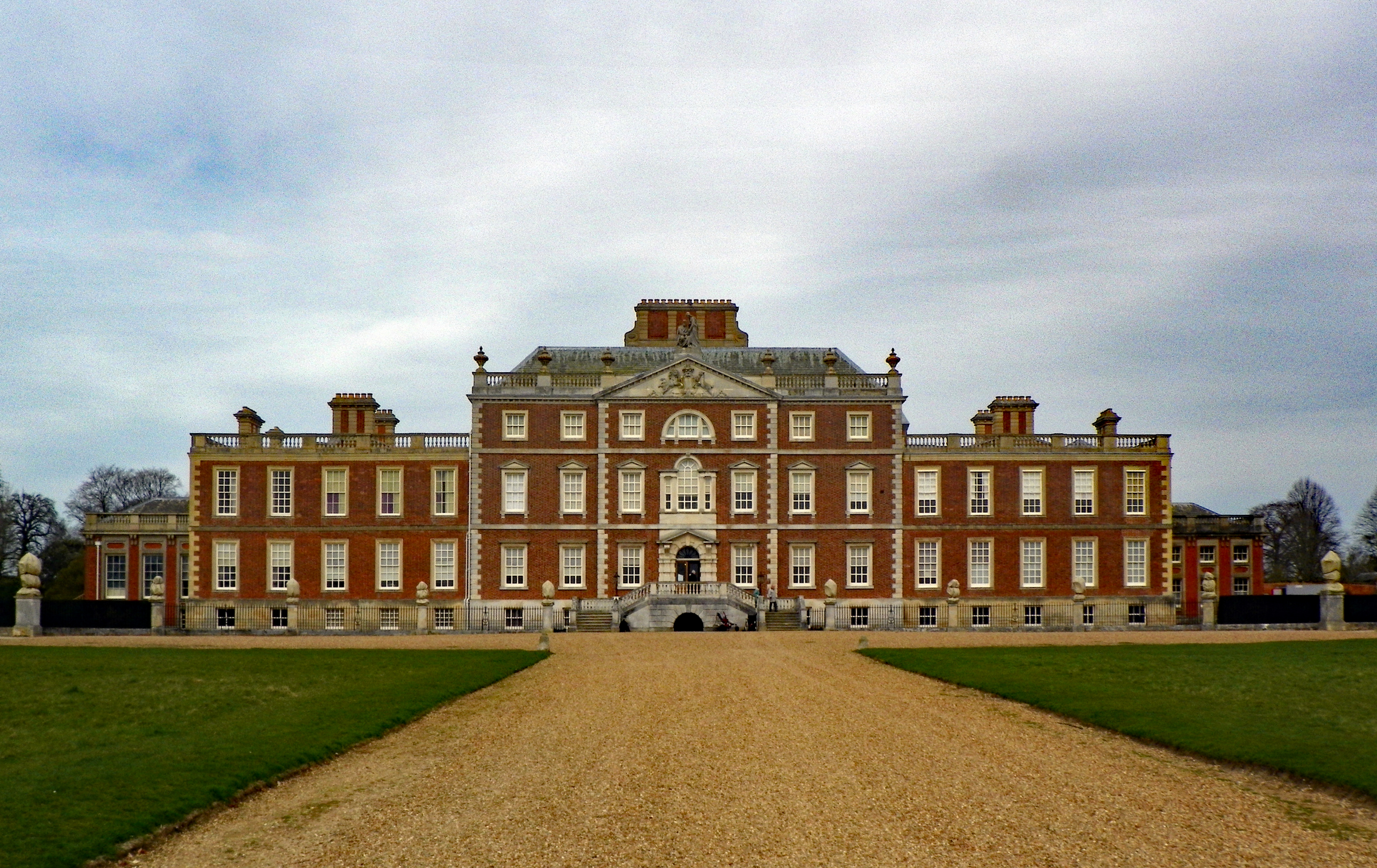
Wimpole Hall

In 1873 he succeeded his father in the earldom and to his estates, including Wimpole Hall in Cambridgeshire, and entered the House of Lords. The following year he was appointed Master of the Buckhounds under Disraeli, and continued in this post until the government fell in 1880.

In 1879 Lord Hardwicke had a horse race, the Hardwicke Stakes, named after him.

An inveterate gambler, the 5th Earl racked up huge debts with the Agar-Robartes Bank and was obliged to put the Wimpole Hall Estate up for sale by auction in 1891. When it failed to raise the reserve price Lord Robartes, as Chairman of Agar-Robartes Bank, accepted the estate in settlement.

== Family ==
Lord Hardwicke married Lady Sophia Georgiana Robertina, daughter of Henry Wellesley, 1st Earl Cowley, in 1863. They had one son and two daughters.

- Lady Feodorowna (1864 - 27 June 1934) married Humphrey Sturt, 2nd Baron Alington on 27 June 1934. They had two sons, and three daughters.
- Lady Magdalen (1865 - 27 Jan 1940) married Sir Richard Henry Williams-Bulkeley, 12th Baronet on 10 December 1885. They had two sons, and two daughters.
- Albert Edward Philip Henry Yorke, 6th Earl of Hardwicke (14 Mar 1867 - 29 Nov 1904)

He died in May 1897, aged 61, and was succeeded in the earldom by his only son, Albert. The Countess of Hardwicke died in June 1923.

Parliament of the United Kingdom
Preceded by Eliot Yorke; Henry John Adeane; Lord George Manners	Member of Parliament for Cambridgeshire; 1865–1873; With: Lord George Manners 1863–1874; Richard Young 1865–1868; Hon. Sir Henry Brand 1868–1874	Succeeded by Lord George Manners; Hon. Elliot Yorke; Hon. Sir Henry Brand
Political offices
Preceded by Lord Proby	Comptroller of the Household; 1866–1868	Succeeded by Lord Otho FitzGerald
Preceded by The Earl of Cork	Master of the Buckhounds; 1874–1880	Succeeded by The Earl of Cork
Peerage of Great Britain
Preceded by Charles Philip Yorke	Earl of Hardwicke; 1873–1897	Succeeded by Albert Edward Phillip Henry Yorke
