= Charles Yorke, 4th Earl of Hardwicke =

Royal Navy Admiral and politician (1799–1873)

Admiral The Right Honourable The Earl of Hardwicke PC
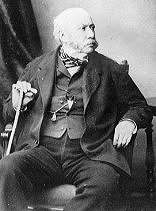

Postmaster General
- In office 1 March 1852 – 17 December 1852
- Monarch: Victoria
- Prime Minister: The Earl of Derby
- Preceded by: The Marquess of Clanricarde
- Succeeded by: The Viscount Canning

Lord Privy Seal
- In office 26 February 1858 – 11 June 1859
- Monarch: Victoria
- Prime Minister: The Earl of Derby
- Preceded by: The Marquess of Clanricarde
- Succeeded by: The Duke of Argyll

Personal details
- Born: 2 April 1799 Sydney Lodge, Hamble le Rice, Hampshire
- Died: 17 September 1873 (aged 74)
- Party: Conservative
- Spouse(s): Hon. Susan Liddell (c. 1810–1886)

Admiral Charles Philip Yorke, 4th Earl of Hardwicke, PC (2 April 1799 – 17 September 1873) was a Royal Navy officer and Conservative politician.

== Background ==
Born at Sydney Lodge, in Hamble le Rice, Hardwicke was the eldest son of Admiral Sir Joseph Sydney Yorke, second son of Charles Yorke, Lord Chancellor, by his second wife, Agneta Johnson. He was a nephew of Philip Yorke, 3rd Earl of Hardwicke. He was educated at Harrow and at the Royal Naval College, where he was awarded the second medal.

== Naval career ==
Hardwicke entered the Royal Navy in May 1815 as midshipman on HMS Prince, the flagship at Spithead. Later, he served in the Mediterranean, on HMS Sparrowhawk (18) and HMS Leviathan (74) then subsequently HMS Queen Charlotte (100), the flagship of Lord Exmouth, by whom he was entrusted with the command of a gunboat at the bombardment of Algiers. He later joined HMS Leander (60) under the flag of Sir David Milne, on the North American station, where he was given the command of the Jane, a small vessel carrying dispatches between Halifax and Bermuda. He was then appointed acting lieutenant of HMS Grasshopper (18) and after a few months commissioned in the rank of lieutenant in August 1819. The next October, he joined the frigate HMS Phaeton on the Halifax station, until appointed to the command of HMS Alacrity in 1823 on the Mediterranean station, in this post he was employed, before and after he obtained the rank of captain in 1825, in watching the movements of the Turko-Egyptian forces and in the suppression of piracy.

Between 1828 and 1831, he took command of HMS Alligator (28), on the same station and took an active part in the naval operation in connection with the struggle between Greece and Turkey. Lastly, between 1844 and 1845, for short periods, he assumed command of the steam yacht HMS Black Eagle and HMS St Vincent (120), in which he carried the Emperor of Russia, Nicholas I, to England. He attained flag rank in 1838. In 1849, while commanding HMS Vengeance, he acted as a mediator between the Mazzinian rebel and the Kingdom of Sardinia during the rebellion in Genoa following the defeat during the First War of Independence. For this actions, he was decorated by the Sardinian King Victor Emmanuel II with a Gold Medal of Military Valour, which he was authorized to accept by Queen Victoria only in 1855. In 1858, he retired from the active list with the rank of rear-admiral, becoming vice-admiral in the same year, and admiral in 1863. He retired from the Royal Navy in 1870.

== Political career ==
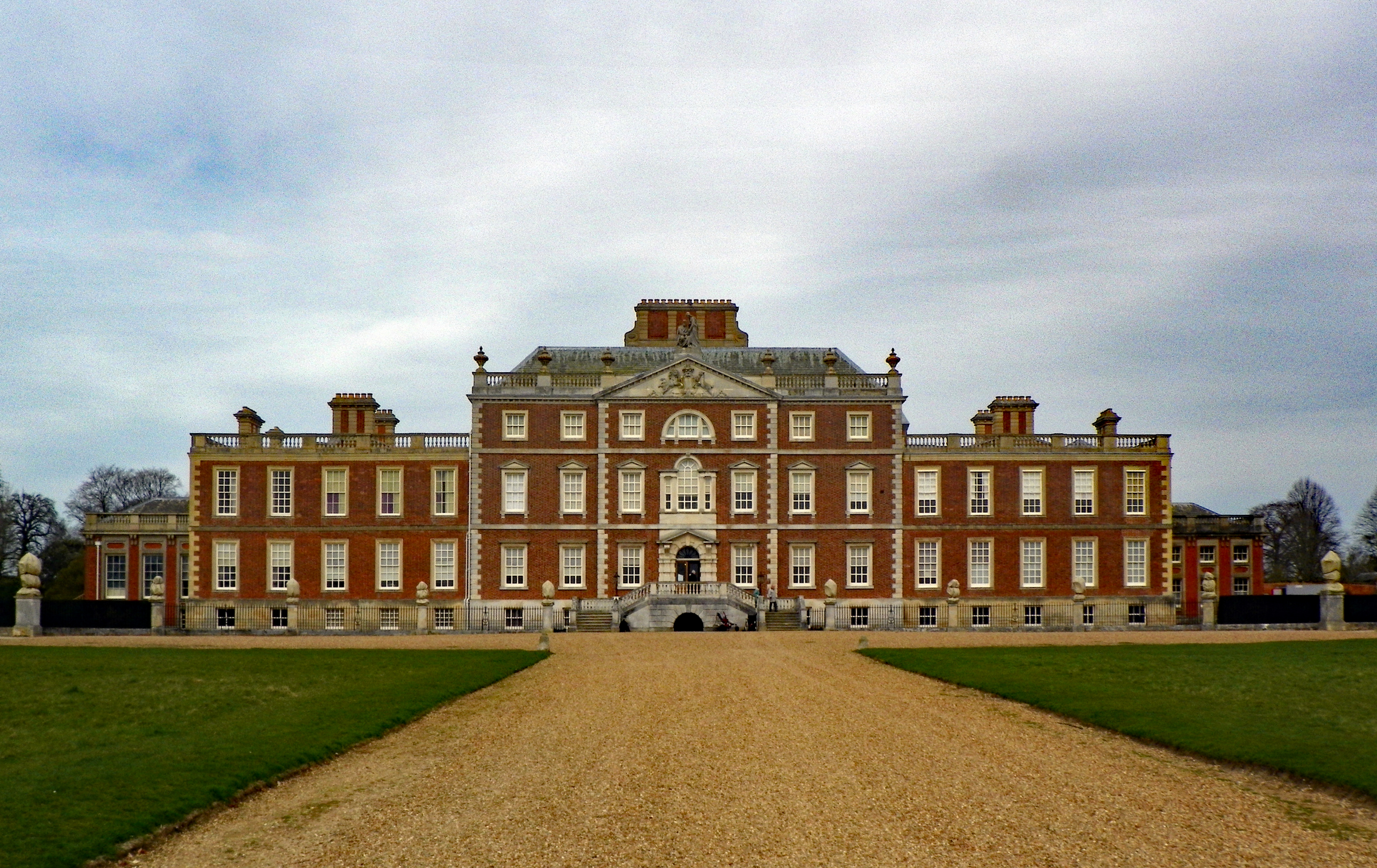
Wimpole Hall

Hardwicke represented Reigate in the House of Commons between 1831 and 1832 and Cambridgeshire between 1832 and 1834. In 1834, on the death of his uncle, he became the fourth Earl of Hardwicke, and inherited the substantial Wimpole estate in Cambridgeshire. He was a member of Lord Derby's cabinet in 1852 as Postmaster General and as Lord Privy Seal between 1858 and 1859. In 1852 he was sworn of the Privy Council.

== Marriage and issue ==
Hardwicke married the Hon. Susan Liddell, sixth daughter of Thomas Liddell, 1st Baron Ravensworth, in August 1833. They had five sons and three daughters:

- Lady Elizabeth Yorke (1834–1916), activist and courtier; married in 1860 to Henry Adeane (died 1870) and in 1877 to Michael Biddulph, 1st Baron Biddulph
- Charles Phillip, Viscount Royston (1836–1897), succeeded as 5th Earl of Hardwicke, father of Albert Yorke, 6th Earl of Hardwicke
- Lady Mary Catherine Yorke (19 May 1837 – 14 December 1890), married in 1857 William George Craven (nephew of 2nd Earl of Craven); their daughter Isabel Sophie married Charles Gordon-Lennox, 7th Duke of Richmond.
- Lady Agneta Harriet Yorke (1838–1919), courtier; married Rear Admiral Victor Montagu and was mother of George Montagu, 9th Earl of Sandwich
- Capt. John Manners Yorke (1840–1909), succeeded his nephew Albert as 7th Earl of Hardwicke
- Lt. Hon. Victor Alexander Yorke (24 March 1842 – 23 December 1867), Royal Artillery, died suddenly aged 25 (Note: While visiting his brother Eliot and his family at the Rothschild's estate at Aston Clinton, Victor Yorke took part in an entertainment programme for children at Lady Rothschild's Jews' Free School. He was reading Tennyson's "The Grandmother" but when he came to the line "He stood like a rock" he suddenly fell off the platform and suffered a massive seizure, and died shortly afterward.)
- Hon. Eliot Constantine Yorke (13 July 1843 – 21 December 1878), equerry to Alfred, Duke of Edinburgh, married in 1873 Anne de Rothschild, second daughter of Sir Anthony de Rothschild, 1st Baronet and Lady Louise de Rothschild
- Hon. Alexander "Alick" Grantham Yorke (20 November 1847 – 17 March 1911), equerry to King Edward VII and groom-in-waiting to Queen Victoria

Hardwicke died in September 1873, aged 74, and was succeeded in the earldom by his eldest son, Charles. The Countess of Hardwicke died in November 1886.

=== Illegitimate children ===
The Earl is alleged to have fathered an illegitimate child, James Pratt, by a local girl named Charlotte Pratt, a servant at his Wimpole Hall home. Charlotte got married in 1849 to Wimpole farmhand, John Rumbold, and the following was noted in Pratt's baptism record from 2 April 1848 (presumably by local genealogist Thomas Peter Roysse Layng, who transcribed the parish registers in 1982):

18-year-old servant girl Charlotte gave birth to a son, James Pratt, who was baptised at Wimpole on the 2 April 1848. The father was understood to have been her employer, the 4th Earl of Hardwicke. The following year, the Earl arranged a marriage for Charlotte with one John Rumbold in return for a cottage at Brick End and financial support for the child. John and Charlotte stayed married for 40 years and are buried together in Wimpole Churchyard.

Rev. Alexander Campbell Yorke, Rector of Fowlmere in Cambridgeshire, and a great-nephew of the 4th Earl, recalled Charlotte in his memoir Wimpole As I Knew It — "Charlotte... was a Pratt; and she was a picture. The handsomest woman that I ever remember to have seen. In harvest time to see her swinging along the road with a bundle of corn balanced on her head, both arms akimbo, was a study in colour, figure and poise".

There is further speculation that in 1856 Hardwicke, again, fathered an illegitimate child by a Wimpole Hall servant girl, Daphne Whitby. Daphne gave birth to Charles Whitby on 7 February 1856, his baptism was registered at the estate church, St Andrew's, on 1 June 1856. The entry in the parish register reads... 'Charles Whitby, son of (blank) and Daphne Whitby, spinster of Wimpole parish.' Daphne went on to marry widower Job Male, a labourer at Wimpole Hall, in April 1857.

== See also ==
- O'Byrne, William Richard (1849). "Yorke, Charles Philip" . A Naval Biographical Dictionary . John Murray – via Wikisource.

== Notes ==
Parliament of the United Kingdom
Preceded by Sir Joseph Sydney Yorke; Joseph Yorke	Member of Parliament for Reigate; 1831–1832; With: Joseph Yorke	Succeeded by Viscount Eastnor
Preceded by Henry John Adeane; Richard Greaves Townley	Member of Parliament for Cambridgeshire; 1832–1834; With: Richard Greaves Townley; John Walbanke-Childers	Succeeded by Richard Greaves Townley; Eliot Thomas Yorke; Richard Jefferson Eaton
Honorary titles
Preceded by The Earl of Hardwicke	Lord Lieutenant of Cambridgeshire; 1835–1873	Succeeded by Charles Watson Townley
Political offices
Preceded by The Marquess of Clanricarde	Postmaster General; 1852	Succeeded by The Viscount Canning
Preceded by The Marquess of Clanricarde	Lord Privy Seal; 1858–1859	Succeeded by The Duke of Argyll
Peerage of Great Britain
Preceded by Philip Yorke	Earl of Hardwicke; 1834–1873	Succeeded by Charles Philip Yorke
