= John Charles Ramsden =

British politician (1788–1836)

Member of Parliament for Malton
- In office 1833–1836 Serving with Charles Pepys; John Walbanke-Childers
- Preceded by: The Viscount Milton; Charles Pepys
- Succeeded by: The Viscount Milton; John Walbanke-Childers
- In office 1812–1831 Serving with The Viscount Duncannon, The Viscount Normanby, Sir James Scarlett, Francis Jeffrey
- Preceded by: Bryan Cooke; Robert Lawrence Dundas
- Succeeded by: Henry Gally Knight; Francis Jeffrey

Member of Parliament for Yorkshire
- In office 1831–1832 Serving with George Strickland, The Viscount Morpeth, Sir John Vanden-Bempde-Johnstone
- Preceded by: Richard Bethell; William Duncombe; Viscount Morpeth; Sir John Vanden-Bempde-Johnstone, Bt
- Succeeded by: Constituency divided

Personal details
- Born: 30 April 1788
- Died: 29 December 1836 (aged 48)
- Party: Whig
- Spouse: Isabella Dundas (m. 1814)
- Relations: Charles Ingram, 9th Viscount of Irvine (grandfather); Sir John Ramsden, 3rd Baronet (grandfather)
- Children: Sir John William Ramsden, 5th Baronet
- Parent(s): Sir John Ramsden, 4th Baronet; Hon. Louisa Susan Ingram-Shepheard

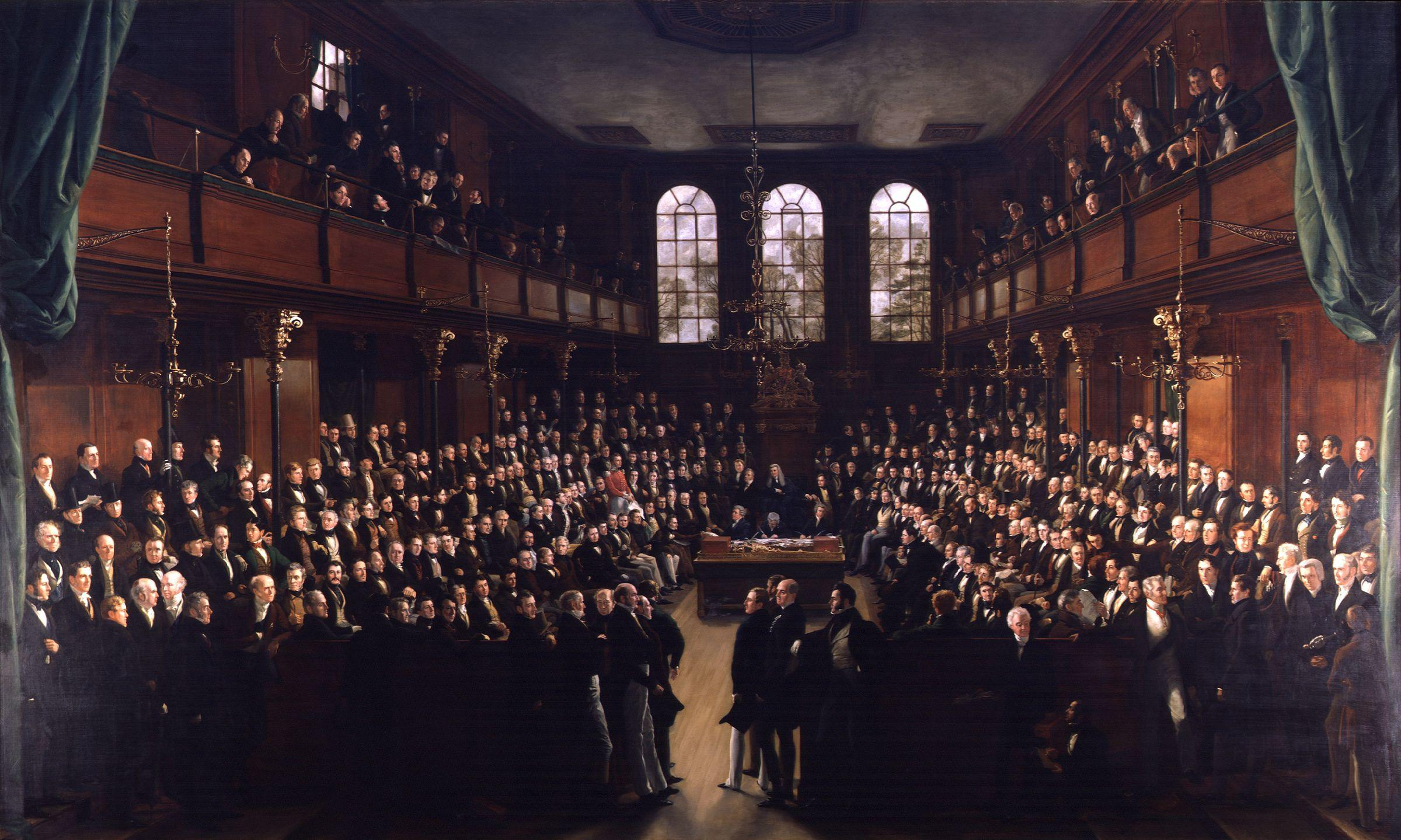
John Charles Ramsden in the House of Commons

John Charles Ramsden (30 April 1788 – 29 December 1836) was a British Whig politician from Newby Park in Yorkshire. He had a seat in the House of Commons between 1812 and 1836.

== Early life ==
He was the eldest son of Sir John Ramsden, 4th Baronet (1755–1839), the Member of Parliament (MP) for Grampound, and his wife Hon. Louisa Susan Ingram-Shepheard (c. 1766–1857), daughter of the 9th Viscount of Irvine. His younger brother, Captain Henry James Ramsden (1799–1871), is the direct ancestor the 8th and 9th Ramsden Baronets.

== Career ==
At the 1812 general election, Ramsden was elected as one of the two MPs for borough of Malton. He was re-elected at the next four general elections, and held the seat until 1831. At the 1831 general election he was elected as one of the four MPs for the Yorkshire county constituency. He was appointed as a Deputy Lieutenant of Yorkshire in May 1831, and held his seat in Parliament until the constituency was divided by the Reform Act 1832, and at the general election in December 1832 he unsuccessfully contested the new North Riding of Yorkshire constituency.

He was returned to the Commons three months later, when he was elected without a contest as MP for the Malton, at a by-election after the sitting Liberal MP Viscount Milton resigned to contest a vacancy in the Northern division of Northamptonshire. He was re-elected unopposed in 1835, and held the seat until his death.

== Personal life ==
On 4 May 1814, he married Isabella Dundas (1790–1887), daughter of Thomas Dundas, 1st Baron Dundas of Aske and Lady Charlotte FitzWilliam. Isabella's maternal grandfather was William Fitzwilliam, 3rd Earl Fitzwilliam, and her uncle was William Fitzwilliam, 4th Earl Fitzwilliam, a leading Whig politician and one of the richest people in Britain. Together, they were the parents of:

- Sir John William Ramsden, 5th Baronet (1831–1914), who married Lady Helen Guendolen Seymour, daughter of Edward Seymour, 12th Duke of Somerset, in 1865.

He died in 1836, aged only 48. As he predeceased his father, his son John succeeded to the baronetcy on the death of his grandfather, the 4th baronet in 1839.

Parliament of the United Kingdom
Preceded by Bryan Cooke; Robert Lawrence Dundas	Member of Parliament for Malton; 1812–1831; With: Viscount Duncannon 1812–26; Viscount Normanby 1826–30; Sir James Scarlett 1830 – April 1831; Francis Jeffrey from April 1831	Succeeded by Henry Gally Knight; Francis Jeffrey
Preceded by Richard Bethell; William Duncombe; Viscount Morpeth; Sir John Vanden-Bempde-Johnstone, Bt	Member of Parliament for Yorkshire; 1831–1832; With: George Strickland; Viscount Morpeth; Sir John Vanden-Bempde-Johnstone, Bt	Constituency divided
Preceded by Viscount Milton (1); Charles Pepys	Member of Parliament for Malton; 1833–1836; With: Charles Pepys to 1836; John Walbanke-Childers from 1836	Succeeded by Viscount Milton (2); John Walbanke-Childers
