= Elizabeth Biddulph, Baroness Biddulph =

English courtier, writer, temperance activist (1834–1916)

The Right Honourable The Lady Biddulph VA
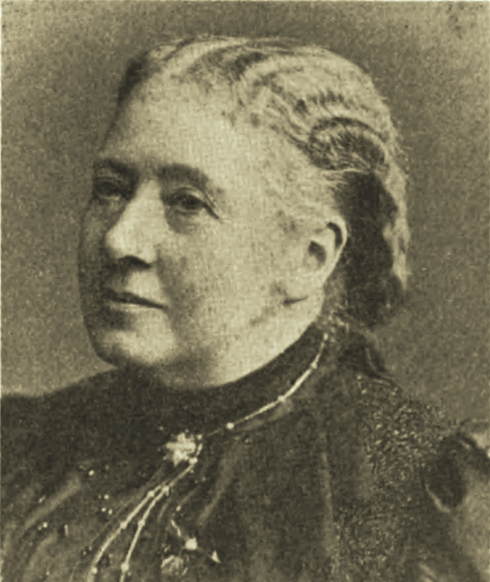
- Born: 15 November 1834; England
- Died: January 1916 (aged 81); London, England
- Burial place: Babraham Hall churchyard
- Occupations: Woman of the Bedchamber; humanitarian; temperance leader
- Spouses: Henry John Adeane (m. 1860; died 1870); Michael Biddulph, 1st Baron Biddulph (m. 1877)
- Children: Charles Adeane
- Parents: Charles Yorke, 4th Earl of Hardwicke (father); Lady Susan Liddell (mother)

Elizabeth Philippa Biddulph, Baroness Biddulph VA (born Lady Elizabeth Yorke, later Lady Elizabeth Adeane; 15 November 1834 – January 1916) was an English humanitarian and temperance leader. She published a biography of her father, Charles Yorke, 4th Earl of Hardwicke, and was appointed a Woman of the Bedchamber by Queen Victoria.

== Early life ==
Lady Elizabeth (nickname, "Lady Libbet") Philippa Yorke was born in England, 15 November 1834. She was a daughter and eldest child of the Charles Yorke, 4th Earl of Hardwicke, and Susan, sixth daughter of Thomas Liddell, 1st Baron Ravensworth. Until her marriage, she lived at Wimpole Hall and was her father's constant companion, sharing in his interests, political and other, including his love of the sea. Her relationships constituted a large social circle, including her mother and her mother's sisters, Lady Normanby, Lady Barrington, and Lady Bloomfield.

== Career ==
In 1860, she married Henry John Adeane, M.P., of Babraham Hall, Cambridgeshire. The couple traveled abroad, and her knowledge of foreign languages, especially of French, which she spoke faultlessly, made foreign travel and society agreeable to her. Italy, she visited more than once with her husband, and after his death; but France was the country of her preference.

After being widowed in 1870, and left to care for their three children, including a son, Charles, Lady Elizabeth was appointed a Woman of the Bedchamber by Queen Victoria, who showed her constant kindness, and Lady Elizabeth was present at all the impressive ceremonies, such as the two Jubilees and the marriage of the King and Queen, which marked the closing years of the Queen's reign. She also spent time with her circle of friends, rich and poor. Holidays were enjoyed at Wimpole or at Sydney Lodge, Hamble-le-Rice, the other home of her family on Southampton Water, built for her grandfather, Admiral Sir Joseph Sydney Yorke.

Although brought up in Tory surroundings, Lady Elizabeth was by nature liberal and broadminded. Her work in Bethnal Green in the early 1870s, she lived mainly in London, gave her opportunity to see the life and temptations of the poor. Of these, she was always of the opinion that alcohol consumption was the worst.

In 1877, she married Michael Biddulph, afterward Baron Biddulph of Ledbury, Herefordshire, a member of the banking firm of Cocks, Biddulph, and Co., London. Mr. Biddulph was raised to the peerage in 1903. Of this marriage, there were no children.

Lady Biddulph was led to join a temperance society in Ledbury through the unwillingness of her physician, the eminent Sir Andrew Clark, to prescribe alcoholic stimulants for her during an attack of illness. His prescription of total abstinence resulted in such positive benefit that she took the total-abstinence pledge and put on the blue ribbon, becoming an active worker in the cause of temperance reform. She was soon afterward elected president of the Ledbury Temperance Union. She also united with the Rechabites and the Good Templars. During 1896–98, she was president of the Women's Total Abstinence Union.

Besides her activities in the temperance cause, Lady Biddulph devoted much of her time to the relief of the poor, and the promotion of various movements for the better care of the sick and dependent classes. She was a patron of the Ledbury Cottage Hospital.

In 1910, she published a biography of her father, Charles Philip Yorke, fourth Earl of Hardwicke : a memoir by his daughter, the Lady Biddulph of Ledbury.

== Personal life ==
Lady Biddulph was a member of the Royal Order of Victoria and Albert.

She died at her London home in January 1916. Burial was at the churchyard of Babraham Hall.

== Selected works ==
- Charles Philip Yorke, fourth Earl of Hardwicke : a memoir by his daughter, the Lady Biddulph of Ledbury, 1910 (Text)
