= Edward Ball (British politician) =

British politician

Edward Ball (1793 – 9 November 1865) was an English Conservative Party politician.

He was elected at the 1852 general election as a member of parliament (MP) for Cambridgeshire, and held the seat until he resigned his seat on 7 January 1863 by the procedural device of accepting appointment as the Steward of the Chiltern Hundreds.

Parliament of the United Kingdom
Preceded by Richard Greaves Townley; Eliot Yorke; Lord George Manners	Member of Parliament for Cambridgeshire; 1852–1863; With: Eliot Yorke 1835–1865; Lord George Manners 1847–1857; Henry John Adeane 1857–1865	Succeeded by Lord George Manners; Eliot Yorke; Henry John Adeane
