= Lord George Manners =

British nobleman and Conservative Party politician (1820-1874)

Lord George John Manners

Member of Parliament for Cambridgeshire
- In office 1847–1857 Serving with Eliot Thomas Yorke; Richard Greaves Townley (1847–1852); Edward Ball (1852–1857)
- Preceded by: Eliot Thomas Yorke; Richard Jefferson Eaton; John Peter Allix
- Succeeded by: Eliot Thomas Yorke; Edward Ball; Henry John Adeane

Member of Parliament for Cambridgeshire
- In office 1863–1874 Serving with Eliot Thomas Yorke (1863–1865); Henry John Adeane (1863–1865); Viscount Royston (1865–1874); Sir Henry Brand (1865–1874); Eliot Constantine Yorke (1874)
- Preceded by: Eliot Thomas Yorke; Edward Ball; Henry John Adeane
- Succeeded by: Sir Henry Brand; Eliot Constantine Yorke; Benjamin Bridges Hunter Rodwell

Personal details
- Born: 22 June 1820
- Died: 8 September 1874 (aged 54) Cheveley Park, Cambridgeshire
- Party: Conservative
- Spouse: Lady Adeliza Matilda Fitzalan-Howard (m. 1855)
- Parents: John Manners, 5th Duke of Rutland (father); Lady Elizabeth Howard (mother)
- Relatives: Frederick Howard, 5th Earl of Carlisle (maternal grandfather); Charles Manners (brother); John Manners (brother); Emmeline Manners (sister); Henry Fitzalan-Howard (father-in-law)
- Education: Eton College
- Alma mater: Trinity College, Cambridge

Lord George John Manners (22 June 1820 – 8 September 1874) was a British nobleman and Conservative Party politician who represented Cambridgeshire for over two decades, from 1847 to 1857 and from 1863 to 1874, when he died.

He was born in London, the youngest son of John Manners, 5th Duke of Rutland by Lady Elizabeth Howard, daughter of Frederick Howard, 5th Earl of Carlisle. Charles Manners, 6th Duke of Rutland was his elder brother. He was educated at Trinity College, Cambridge, where he was a member of the University Pitt Club.

He was a Justice of the Peace for Cambridgeshire.

== Marriage and issue ==
Lord George married Lady Adeliza Matilda Fitzalan-Howard, the youngest daughter of Henry Fitzalan-Howard, 13th Duke of Norfolk, on 4 October 1855. They were second cousins through their descent from Granville Leveson-Gower, 1st Marquess of Stafford. They had five children:

- Cicely Elizabeth Adeliza Manners (21 November 1856 – 29 March 1949), died unmarried
- Captain Charles George Edmund John Manners (26 September 1858 – 25 September 1911), died unmarried
- Sir George Espec John Manners (17 June 1860 – 2 September 1939), married on 24 April 1884 Anna Gilstrap (d. 1940), died without issue
- Frances Geraldine Manners (20 August 1864 – 6 March 1865)
- Major Fitzalan George John Manners (27 February 1866 – 15 March 1901), unmarried, officer in the Scots Guards, died of enteric fever aboard SS Tagus during the Boer War

He died at his seat in Cheveley Park, Cambridgeshire.

Lady Adeliza died in 1904.

Parliament of the United Kingdom
Preceded by Eliot Thomas Yorke; Richard Jefferson Eaton; John Peter Allix	Member of Parliament for Cambridgeshire; 1847–1857; With: Eliot Thomas Yorke; Richard Greaves Townley 1847–1852; Edward Ball 1852–1857	Succeeded by Eliot Thomas Yorke; Edward Ball; Henry John Adeane
Preceded by Eliot Thomas Yorke; Edward Ball; Henry John Adeane	Member of Parliament for Cambridgeshire; 1863–1874; With: Eliot Thomas Yorke 1863–1865; Henry John Adeane 1863–1865; Viscount Royston 1865–1874; Sir Henry Brand 1865–1874; Eliot Constantine Yorke 1874	Succeeded by Sir Henry Brand; Eliot Constantine Yorke; Benjamin Bridges Hunter Rodwell
