= John Peter Allix =

British politician

Member of Parliament for Cambridgeshire
- In office 5 July 1841 – 9 August 1847 Serving with Eliot Yorke; Richard Jefferson Eaton
- Preceded by: Richard Greaves Townley; Eliot Yorke; Richard Jefferson Eaton
- Succeeded by: Eliot Yorke; Richard Greaves Townley; George Manners

Personal details
- Born: 2 December 1785
- Died: 19 February 1848 (aged 62)
- Party: Conservative

John Peter Allix (2 December 1785 – 19 February 1848) was a British Conservative politician.

Allix was the son of John Peter Allix of Swaffham Prior, Cambridgeshire. He was educated at King Edward VI School, Bury St Edmunds and Emmanuel College, Cambridge.

He was elected Conservative Member of Parliament for Cambridgeshire at the 1841 general election and held the seat until 1847 when he did not seek re-election.

Parliament of the United Kingdom
Preceded by Richard Greaves Townley; Eliot Yorke; Richard Jefferson Eaton	Member of Parliament for Cambridgeshire; 1841–1847; With: Eliot Yorke; Richard Jefferson Eaton	Succeeded by Eliot Yorke; Richard Greaves Townley; George Manners
