= Eliot Yorke =

British politician and barrister

Hon. Eliot Thomas Yorke MP DL was a British politician and barrister.

== Background ==
Yorke was the third son of Vice-Admiral the Hon. Sir Joseph Sydney Yorke, second son of Charles Yorke, second son of Philip Yorke, 1st Earl of Hardwicke. His mother was Elizabeth Weake Rattray, daughter of James Rattray. Admiral Charles Yorke, 4th Earl of Hardwicke, was his elder brother.

He was educated at Harrow School, and matriculated at St John's College, Cambridge in 1824, graduating B.A. in 1827 (M.A. in 1830). He was admitted to Lincoln's Inn in 1827, and called to the bar in 1832. He was granted the precedence of an earl's son by Royal warrant in 1836.

Yorke was a magistrate and deputy-lieutenant (DL) for Cambridgeshire, and for many years chairman of quarter sessions for that county. He was a director of the Bank of England

== Political career ==
The Conservative party nominated Yorke, a barrister as one of their candidates on 12 January 1835 Yorke was elected as one of three representatives for Cambridgeshire in the 1835 general election, a seat he held until 1865.

== Personal life ==
On 31 January 1833, Yorke married Emily Anne Millicent, daughter of Emilius Henry Delmé Radcliffe, in St. Mary, Hitchin, Hertfordshire. They had no children. He died on 3 May 1885, at 15 Park Street, Westminster, London, aged 80. Emily Yorke died on 1 January 1894, in Westminster, London.

Parliament of the United Kingdom
Preceded by Richard Greaves Townley; Charles Yorke; John Walbanke-Childers	Member of Parliament for Cambridgeshire; 1835–1865; With: Richard Greaves Townley 1835–1841, 1847–1852; Richard Jefferson Eaton 1835–1847; John Peter Allix 1841–1847; Lord George Manners 1847–1857, 1863–1865; Edward Ball 1852–1863; Henry John Adeane 1857–1865	Succeeded by Lord George Manners; Viscount Royston; Richard Young
