= Richard Jefferson Eaton =

British politician

Member of Parliament for Cambridgeshire
- In office 19 January 1835 – 9 August 1847 Serving with Eliot Yorke (1835–1847); John Peter Allix (1841–1847); Richard Greaves Townley (1835–1841)
- Preceded by: Richard Greaves Townley; Charles Yorke; John Walbanke-Childers
- Succeeded by: Eliot Yorke; Richard Greaves Townley; George Manners

Personal details
- Born: 1806
- Died: 27 July 1847 (aged 40–41)
- Party: Conservative

Richard Jefferson Eaton (1806 – 27 July 1847) was a British Conservative politician.

Eaton was elected Conservative Member of Parliament for Cambridgeshire at the 1835 general election and held the seat until 1847 when he did not seek re-election.

Parliament of the United Kingdom
Preceded by Richard Greaves Townley; Charles Yorke; John Walbanke-Childers	Member of Parliament for Cambridgeshire; 1835–1847; With: Eliot Yorke (1835–1847); John Peter Allix (1841–1847); Richard Greaves Townley (1835–1841)	Succeeded by Eliot Yorke; Richard Greaves Townley; George Manners
