= Charles Pepys, 1st Earl of Cottenham =

English lawyer and politician (1781–1851)

The Right Honourable The Earl of Cottenham PC
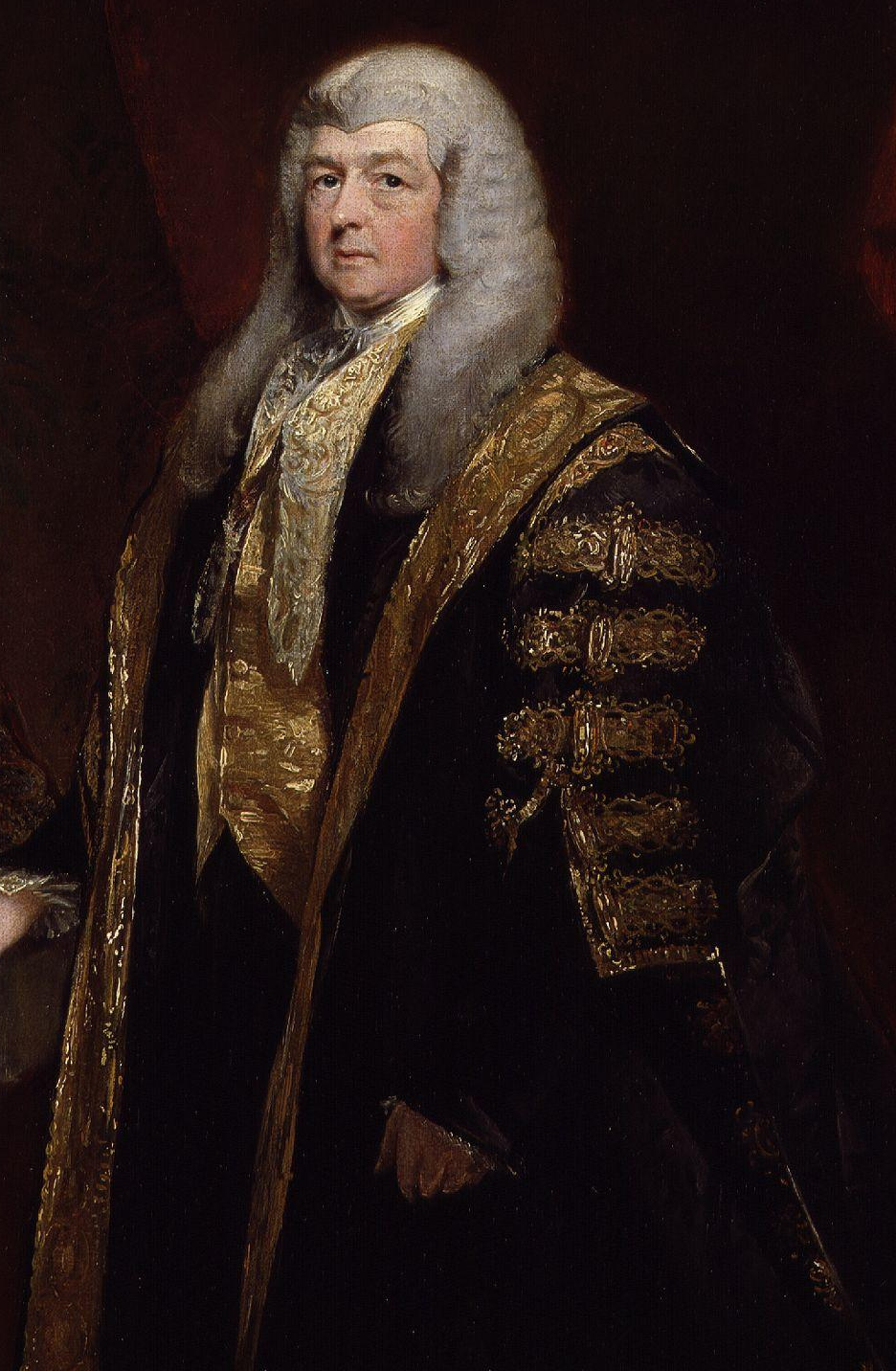
- Lord Cottenham wearing ceremonial robes when presiding in the House of Lords as Lord Chancellor. Detail of a painting by Charles Robert Leslie.

Lord Chancellor
- In office 16 January 1836 – 30 August 1841
- Monarchs: William IV; Victoria
- Prime Minister: The Viscount Melbourne
- Preceded by: In Commission
- Succeeded by: The Lord Lyndhurst
- In office 6 July 1846 – 19 June 1850
- Monarch: Victoria
- Prime Minister: Lord John Russell
- Preceded by: The Lord Lyndhurst
- Succeeded by: In Commission

Member of Parliament for Malton
- In office September 1831 – January 1836; Served alongside Henry Gally Knight, Viscount Milton and John Charles Ramsden
- Preceded by: Lord Cavendish of Keighley; Henry Gally Knight
- Succeeded by: John Childers; John Charles Ramsden

Member of Parliament for Higham Ferrers
- In office July 1831 – October 1831
- Preceded by: Viscount Milton
- Succeeded by: John Ponsonby

Member of the House of Lords Lord Temporal
- In office January 1836 – April 1851; Hereditary Peerage
- Succeeded by: Charles Edward Pepys

Personal details
- Born: 29 April 1781 Wimpole Street, London
- Died: 29 April 1851 (aged 70) Pietra Santa, Lucca, Grand Duchy of Tuscany
- Party: Whig
- Spouse: Caroline Wingfield-Baker (1801–1868)
- Education: Trinity College, Cambridge

Charles Christopher Pepys, 1st Earl of Cottenham, PC (/ˈpɛpɪs/; 29 April 1781 – 29 April 1851) was an English lawyer, judge and politician. He was twice Lord High Chancellor of Great Britain.

== Background and education ==
Cottenham was born in London, the second son of Sir William Pepys, 1st Baronet, a master in chancery, who was descended from John Pepys, of Cottenham, Cambridgeshire, a great-uncle of Samuel Pepys the diarist. Educated at Harrow School and Trinity College, Cambridge, Pepys was called to the bar of Lincoln's Inn in 1804.

== Legal and political career ==
Cottenham's progress was slow practising at the Chancery Bar. Not until 22 years after his call was he made a King's Counsel. He sat in Parliament successively for Higham Ferrers and Malton, became Solicitor General in 1834 and Master of the Rolls in the same year.

On the formation of Lord Melbourne's second administration in April 1835, the great seal was in commission for a time, but Cottenham, who had been a commissioner, was eventually appointed Lord Chancellor in January 1836 and at the same time was raised to the peerage as Baron Cottenham of Cottenham in the County of Cambridge. He held office until the ministry's defeat in August 1841.

== Earldom ==
In February 1841, during the trial of Lord Cardigan for attempted murder, Cottenham claimed ill health, leaving the task of presiding as Lord High Steward to the Lord Chief Justice of the Queen's Bench, Lord Denman. In 1846 he again became Lord Chancellor in Lord John Russell's administration. His health, however, was failing and he resigned in 1850.

Shortly before retirement, he was created Viscount Crowhurst, of Crowhurst in the County of Surrey, and Earl of Cottenham, of Cottenham in the County of Cambridge. He lived at Prospect Place, Wimbledon in 1831–1851. He had succeeded his elder brother as third Baronet in 1845, and in 1849 his cousin as fourth Baronet of Juniper Hill.

== Family ==
Lord Cottenham married Caroline Elizabeth, daughter of William Wingfield-Baker, in 1821 and had five sons and three daughters. He died at Pietra Santa, Lucca in the Italian Grand Duchy of Tuscany in April 1851, aged 70, and was succeeded by his eldest son, Charles, who was at the time Clerk of the Crown in Chancery. Lady Cottenham died in April 1868, aged 66 at The Cedars in Sunninghill, Berkshire.

Cottenham's niece Emily Pepys (1833–1887), daughter of Henry Pepys, Bishop of Worcester, was a child diarist. Her work was not rediscovered and published until 1984.

Political offices
Preceded by In Commission	Lord High Chancellor of Great Britain; 1836–1841	Succeeded by The Lord Lyndhurst
Preceded by The Lord Lyndhurst	Lord High Chancellor of Great Britain; 1846–1850	In commission Title next held by The Lord Truro
Peerage of the United Kingdom
New creation	Earl of Cottenham; 1850–1851	Succeeded by Charles Edward Pepys
New creation	Baron Cottenham; 1836–1851	Succeeded by Charles Edward Pepys
Baronetage of Great Britain
Preceded by Harry Leslie	Baronet (of Brook Street); 1849–1851	Succeeded by Charles Edward Pepys
Baronetage of the United Kingdom
Preceded by William Pepys	Baronet (of Wimpole Street); 1845–1851	Succeeded by Charles Edward Pepys
