= Henry John Adeane =

English barrister and politician

Henry John Adeane DL (18 June 1789 – 11 May 1847) was an English barrister and politician.

== Early life and education ==
Adeane was the second but first surviving son of Robert Jones Adeane of Babraham, Cambridgeshire, and Annabella Blake, daughter of Sir Patrick Blake, 1st Baronet, of Langham Hall, Suffolk. Although the Adeane family's alleged descent from the ancient noble Deyne or Dene family, of Wallingford, was included in their entry in Burke's Peerage, this was later omitted, as part of the company's endeavour to shed a reputation for inclusion of "apocryphal" family traditions, which were "expunged, erroneous particulars and incorrect descents discovered and omitted...". He was the grandson of Gen. James Whorwood Adeane. He was educated at Trinity College, Cambridge.

== Career ==
Adeane became a member of Lincoln's Inn in 1810 and the Inner Temple in 1813. He was called to the bar in 1814.

He was a Whig Member (MP) of the Parliament of the United Kingdom for Cambridgeshire 1830 to 1832.

== Family ==
Adeane married firstly, on 24 October 1822, Katharine Judith (1804 – 27 June 1825), daughter of John King of Aldenham House, Herts. They had two sons and one daughter:

- Anne Adeane (1822–1900) unm.
- Robert Jones Adeane (1825–1826)

He married secondly, on 6 October 1828, Hon. Matilda Abigail Stanley, daughter of John Stanley, 1st Baron Stanley of Alderley of Alderley Park, Cheshire. They had three sons and eight daughters:

- Matilda Annabella Maria Adeane (1829 – 11 September 1853)
- Robert Jones Adeane (9 September 1830 – 7 December 1853), died unmarried
- Henry John Adeane (1833–1870), MP for Cambridgeshire, married Lady Elizabeth Philippa Yorke, daughter of the Earl of Hardwicke
- Alethea Louisa Maria Adeane (1830–1923), married Henry Grenfell MP
- Lucy Elizabeth Adeane (1832–1904), married Admiral Sir Edward Sotheby
- Emmeline Augusta Adeane (1835 – 27 November 1930), married Rev. Thomas Erskine, rector of Steppingley, grandson of 1st Lord Erskine and great-grandson of the 10th Earl of Buchan
- Admiral Edward Stanley Adeane (1836–1902) married Lady Edith Isabella Dalzell, daughter of the Earl of Carnwath
- Isabel Adeane (1839–1913), married Robert Smith
- Louisa Amabel Adeane (1841–1894), married John Martineau
- Jane Henrietta Adeane (1842–1926), died unmarried
- Constance Maria Josepha Adeane (1845–1918), married Hugh Colin Smith, Governor of the Bank of England, and their eldest son was Vivian Smith, 1st Baron Bicester.
- Frederic Carus Adeane (1847 – 5 December 1852), died young
