= My Boy Jack (play) =

Play written by David Haig

My Boy Jack is a 1997 play by English actor David Haig. It tells the story of Rudyard Kipling and his grief for his son, John, who died in the First World War.

The title comes from Kipling's 1915 poem, My Boy Jack.

== Theatre (2004) ==
My Boy Jack played at the Theatre Royal, Nottingham, in 2004. It then toured Oxford, Richmond, Brighton, Norwich, Cardiff and Cambridge, with the newly formed Haig Lang Productions. In America, My Boy Jack has been performed under the title My Son Jack.

== Television (2007) ==
A television drama based on Haig's play was filmed in August 2007, with Haig as Kipling and Daniel Radcliffe as Jack Kipling. It was distributed by Granada and Ecosse Films. It was broadcast on ITV1 and TV3 (Ireland) at 9pm on Sunday 11 November 2007, Remembrance Day.

== Recent research ==
In 1992 the Commonwealth War Graves Commission claimed to have identified John Kipling's body. However, Tonie and Valmai Holt (authors of the successful Major and Mrs Holt's Battlefield Guides) doubted the "identification" and researched John's life and death in detail, writing the first biography of John Kipling, entitled My Boy Jack? In November 2007 the Imperial War Museum mounted an exhibition covering John Kipling's life and included a section on the Holts' doubts about the identification of his corpse. Subsequently, in January 2016, further research by Graham Parker and Joanna Legg confirmed the initial identification to be correct. The ITV drama does not claim to be a documentary account, but a representation of the experience of so many families who lost sons during the Great War.

== Dramatis Personae ==
- Rudyard Kipling, a writer
- John "Jack" Kipling, his son
- Caroline "Carrie" Kipling, his wife
- Elsie "Bird" Kipling, his daughter
- Guardsman McHugh
- Guardsman Bowe
- Guardsman Doyle
- Mr. Frankland
- Major Sparks
- Col. Rory Pottle
- George Bambridge

== Plot ==
=== Act One ===
My Boy Jack begins comically, with 15-year-old Jack Kipling trying on a pair of pince-nez. He is unable to see well without correction, but his father, Rudyard Kipling, wants him to wear the pince-nez to take his vision exam; it will make Jack's vision troubles look less serious. Jack fails the test, however; he cannot read the eye chart, without the pince-nez, from farther away than about a metre.

Jack, at home again, talks with Elsie, his sister. He explains that he wants to leave in order to get away from "this house and everything", and Elsie becomes angry with Jack — not because he wants to leave her, but because he could be killed at war. Kipling comes into the room, and Elsie hides behind a chair. Kipling then tells Jack that he will get Jack into the army, somehow. After Kipling leaves, Elsie emerges, furious.

The act ends with Jack leading his men into battle. In the theatre, there is then an interval.

=== Act Two ===
This part of My Boy Jack deals with the Kipling family receiving the news of Jack being declared Missing In Action. During an argument with Carrie, Kipling reveals his guilt and responsibility helping Jack enlist in the army. Elsie reveals that Jack went to war, not out of patriotism, but to get away from his family, particularly to escape the shadow of Kipling's fame.

There is then a flashback to a time when Jack was only seven, showing Jack and Elsie with their father.

It is now 1924, and Elsie is marrying George Bambridge. Her parents, though still missing Jack, are beginning to move on; they are happy for Elsie. Kipling has been interviewing soldiers from Jack's regiment of Irish Guards. One of them who served under Jack recalls his last moments. Jack had been leading a charge against the German trenches, continuing the attack while the other soldiers dropped off in fear. Jack was killed by machine gun fire just as he reached enemy lines. Kipling received some bittersweet solace in knowing that his son died heroically.

The play then jumps forward nine years, to 1933. It has been twenty years since My Boy Jack first began, in 1913. There are rumours of war, again, and Kipling wonders why the Great War was even fought. What was the point of his son's death, if there will just be another war?

My Boy Jack ends with Kipling reciting his poem, My Boy Jack.

== Cast ==
The Casts of My Boy Jack
Character	British Touring Cast
Rudyard Kipling	David Haig
Caroline "Carrie" Kipling	Belinda Lang
Elsie "Bird" Kipling	Rosanna Lavelle
John "Jack" Kipling	Ben Silverstone
Guardsman Bowe	Simon Wolfe
Major Sparks	Chris Moran
Mr Frankland	Fred Ridgeway
Young Jack	Changed depending on area
Young Elsie	Changed depending on area
