= John Kipling =

British Army officer

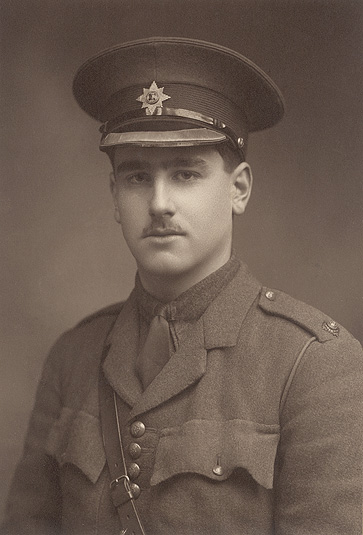
- John Kipling in the uniform of the Irish Guards, 1915
- Born: 17 August 1897; Rottingdean, Sussex, England
- Died: 27 September 1915 (aged 18); Loos-en-Gohelle, France
- Burial place: St Mary's ADS Cemetery, Haisnes
- Relatives: Rudyard Kipling (father); Caroline Starr Balestier (mother); Elsie Bambridge (sister)
- Military career
- Allegiance: United Kingdom
- Branch: British Army
- Service years: 1914–1915
- Rank: Second lieutenant
- Unit: Irish Guards
- Conflicts: First World War: Battle of Loos †

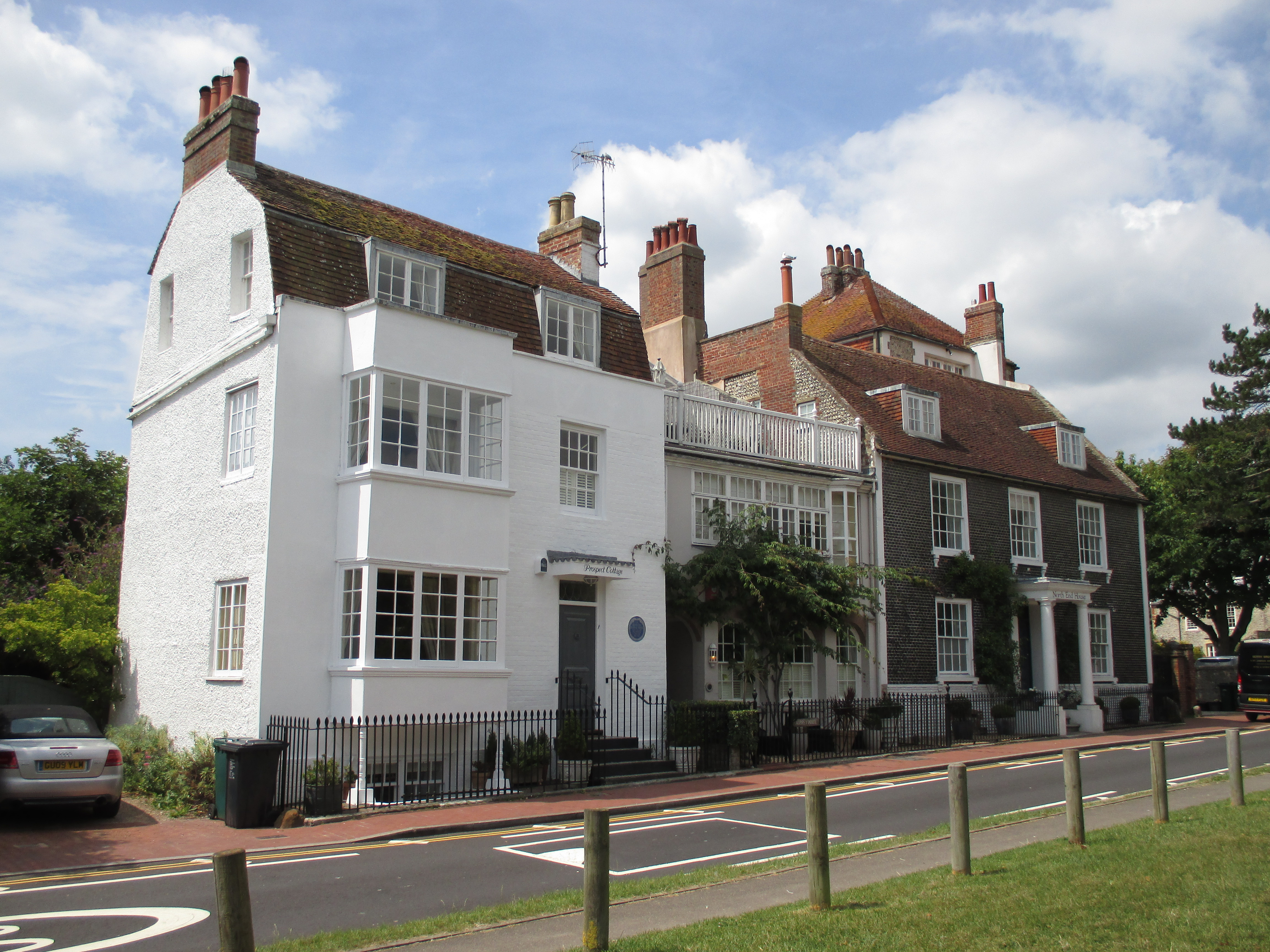
North End House, Rottingdean, John Kipling's birthplace

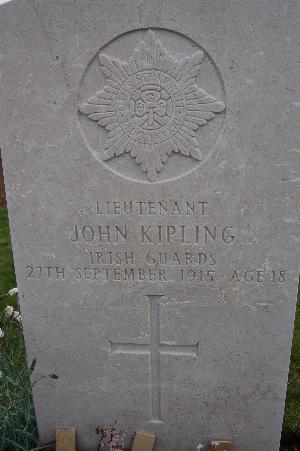
John Kipling's grave.

Second Lieutenant John Kipling (17 August 1897 – 27 September 1915) was a British Army officer. The only son of English author Rudyard Kipling, during World War I, his father used his influence to gain Kipling a commission in the British army despite being rejected for poor eyesight. Kipling's death at the Battle of Loos caused his family immense grief.

== Early life ==
Born in 1897, Kipling was the youngest of three children of the author Rudyard Kipling and his American wife Caroline Starr Balestier. He was born at North End House, Rottingdean in Sussex. He was educated at St. Aubyn's, Rottingdean, and Wellington College, Berkshire.

== First World War ==
Kipling was 16 when the First World War broke out in August 1914. His father, a keen imperialist and patriot, was soon writing propaganda on behalf of the British government. Rudyard sought to get his son a commission, but John was rejected by the Royal Navy due to severe short-sightedness. He was also initially rejected by the army for the same reason.

However, Rudyard Kipling was friends with Frederick Roberts, 1st Earl Roberts, a former Commander-in-Chief of the British Army, and Colonel of the Irish Guards, and through this influence, John Kipling was commissioned as a second lieutenant into the 2nd Battalion, Irish Guards on 15 August 1914, two days before his seventeenth birthday. After reports of the Rape of Belgium and the sinking of the RMS Lusitania in 1915, Rudyard Kipling came to see the war as a crusade for civilisation against barbarism, and was even more keen that his son should see active service.

After completing his training John Kipling was sent to France in August along with the rest of the battalion, which was part of the 2nd Guards Brigade of the Guards Division. His father was already there on a visit, serving as a war correspondent.

=== Death ===
Kipling was reported injured and missing in action in September 1915 during the Battle of Loos. There remains no definite evidence relating to the cause of his death, but credible reporting indicates he was last seen attacking a German position, possibly with a head injury. With fighting continuing, his body was not identified. However, in 1992, a mistake was discovered in the paperwork and the Commonwealth War Graves Commission identified his grave changing an inscription on the gravestone of an unknown soldier to read John Kipling.

His parents searched vainly for him in field hospitals and interviewed comrades to try to identify what had happened. A notice was published in The Times on 7 October 1915 confirming the known facts that he was "wounded and missing".

The death of John inspired Rudyard Kipling to become involved with the Commonwealth War Graves Commission and write a wartime history of the Irish Guards. He also wrote as an epitaph “If any question why we died, / Tell them, because our fathers lied.” However, contrary to popular belief, the poem "My Boy Jack" does not allude to the wartime loss of his son, rather it was probably written about the death of Jack Cornwell, the youngest sailor killed at the Battle of Jutland. He also wrote the short verse "A Son": "My son was killed while laughing at some jest. I would I knew/What it was, and it might serve me in a time when jests are few."

== Grave ==
The grave of John Kipling was identified by military historian Norm Christie, then Records Officer of the Commonwealth War Graves Commission, in 1992, and Kipling was officially listed as buried in St Mary's ADS Cemetery in Haisnes. In 2002, research by military historians Tonie and Valmai Holt suggested that this grave was not that of Kipling but of another officer, Arthur Jacob of the London Irish Rifles. In January 2016, however, further research by Graham Parker and Joanna Legg demonstrated that the grave attribution to John Kipling is correct. A spokesman for the Commonwealth War Graves Commission stated that it "welcomed the latest research which supports the identification of the grave of John Kipling".

== My Boy Jack ==
The play My Boy Jack was written in 1997 by David Haig. In 2007, it was adapted into a film of the same name, with Daniel Radcliffe as John Kipling.

== See also ==
- List of solved missing person cases (pre-1950)
