= My Boy Jack (poem) =

Poem by Rudyard Kipling

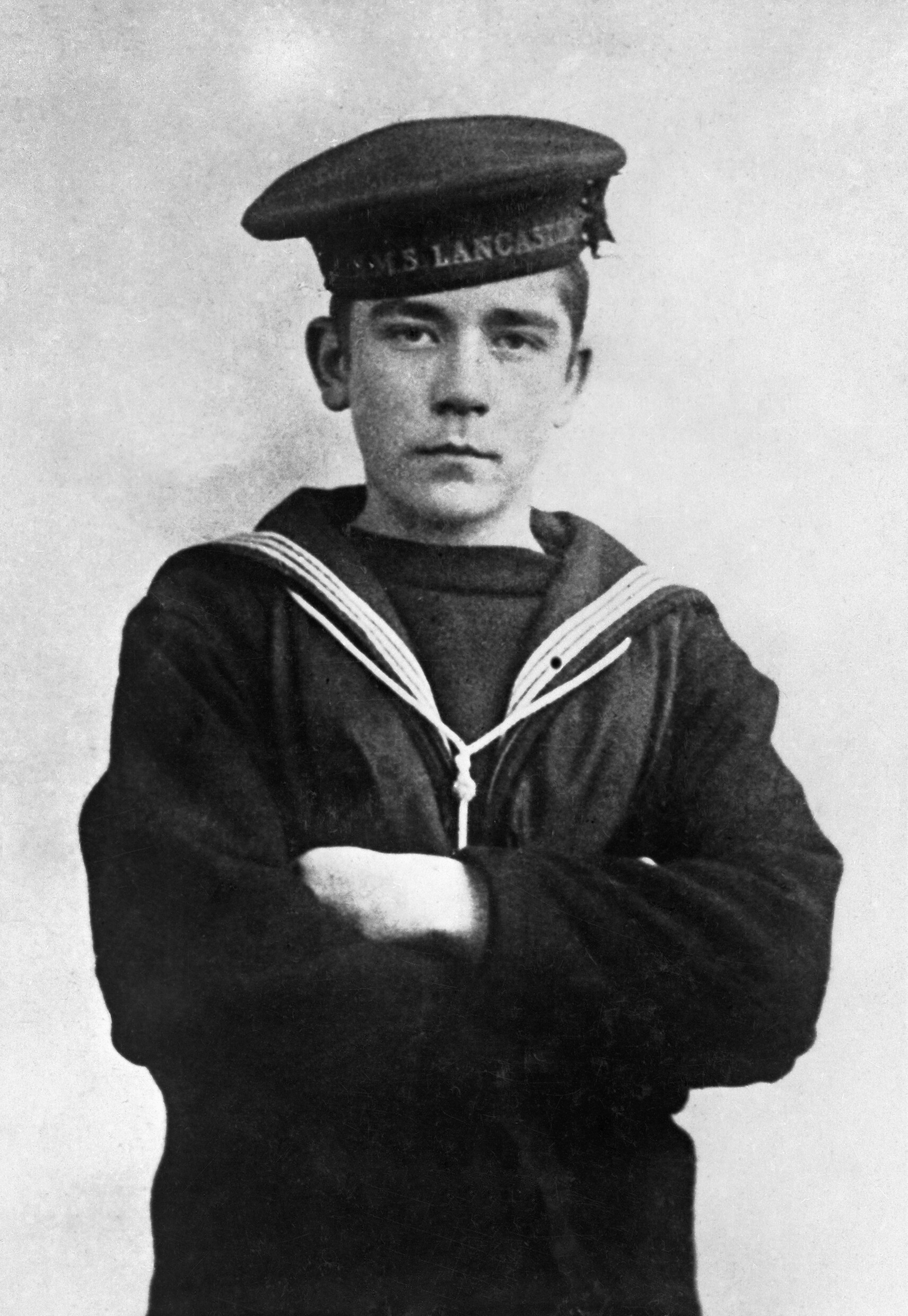
Jack Cornwell in 1915

"My Boy Jack" is a 1916 poem by Rudyard Kipling. Kipling wrote it for Jack Cornwell, the 16-year-old youngest recipient of the Victoria Cross, who stayed by his post on board the light cruiser HMS Chester at the Battle of Jutland until he died. Kipling's son John was never referred to as "Jack". The poem echoes the grief of all parents who lost sons in the First World War. The poet's son John Kipling was a 2nd Lt in the Army and went missing in action in September 1915 during the Battle of Loos in the First World War. The poem was published as a prelude to a story in Kipling Sr.'s book Sea Warfare written about the Battle of Jutland in 1916. The imagery and theme is maritime in nature and as such it is about a generic nautical Jack (or Jack Tar), though emotionally affected by the death of Kipling's son.

== Text of the poem ==
"Have you news of my boy Jack?”
Not this tide.
"When d'you think that he'll come back?"
Not with this wind blowing, and this tide.

"Has any one else had word of him?"
Not this tide.
For what is sunk will hardly swim,
Not with this wind blowing, and this tide.

"Oh, dear, what comfort can I find?"
None this tide,
Nor any tide,
Except he did not shame his kind—
Not even with that wind blowing, and that tide.

Then hold your head up all the more,
This tide,
And every tide;
Because he was the son you bore,
And gave to that wind blowing and that tide!

== Dramatisation ==
My Boy Jack is the name of a 1997 play written by English actor David Haig. It examines how grief affected Rudyard Kipling and his family following the death of his son, John (known as Jack; although see the main Wikipedia entry on Rudyard Kipling), at the Battle of Loos in 1915. It includes a recitation of the poem, My Boy Jack. Ben Silverstone first played Jack Kipling on stage, while Daniel Radcliffe took over the role for the ITV screen adaptation of the same name. Haig played Rudyard Kipling on both stage and screen.

Concurrent with the play, 'My Boy Jack?', the first biography of John Kipling, written by Tonie and Valmai Holt, was published in 1998 by Pen and Sword Books. The book was inspired by the dispute over the supposed identification of John Kipling's body. Hence the question mark in the book's title.

== Musical settings ==
- "Have You News of my Boy Jack?" set to music by Ina Boyle in 1916.
- "Have You News of My Boy Jack?" set to music by Edward German in 1917.
- "My Boy Jack", song for medium voice and piano by Betty Roe.
- Neofolk singer Andrew King recorded a song showcasing the lyrics to this poem.
- Setting for voice and concertina by Peter Bellamy. Bellamy's version was also set to a three part harmony by the English folk group "Lady Maisery" on their 2011 début album Weave and Spin, and was recorded by a cappella group "Hex" on their 2014 CD Husk and Bark.
- "My Boy Jack" song for a variety of arrangements for Baritone solo by Stephen DeCesare

== See also ==
- 1915 in poetry
