= 1915 in poetry =

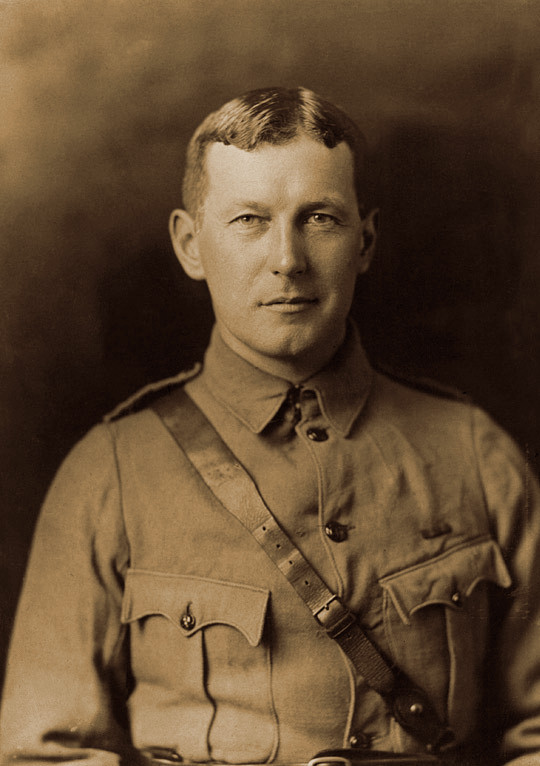
John McCrae, about 1914

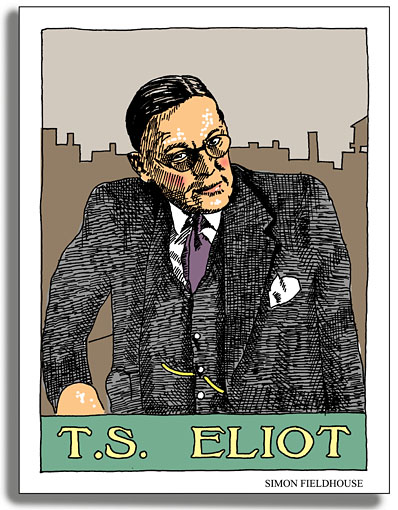
Drawing by Simon Fieldhouse

In Flanders fields the poppies blow
Between the crosses, row on row,
That mark our place; and in the sky
The larks, still bravely singing, fly
Scarce heard amid the guns below.

We are the dead. Short days ago
We lived, felt dawn, saw sunset glow,
Loved, and were loved, and now we lie
In Flanders fields.

Take up our quarrel with the foe:
To you from failing hands we throw
The torch; be yours to hold it high.
If ye break faith with us who die
We shall not sleep, though poppies grow

In Flanders fields.

— John McCrae, In Flanders Fields

And I have known the eyes already, known them all—
The eyes that fix you in a formulated phrase,
And when I am formulated, sprawling on a pin,
When I am pinned and wriggling on the wall,
Then how should I begin
To spit out all the butt-ends of my days and ways?

And how should I presume?

— T.S. Eliot, from The Love Song of J. Alfred Prufrock

Nationality words link to articles with information on the nation's poetry or literature (for instance, Irish or France).

== Events ==
- January – The Geração de Orpheu launch the short-lived magazine Orpheu, introducing literary modernism to Portugal.
- February – The group of young Colombian writers and artists in Medellín, los Panidas, first publish their magazine Panida, including the first published poem of León de Greiff, the editor (writing as Leo le Gris), "Ballad of the Mad Owls".
- February 12 – American poet Robert Frost leaves the Dymock poets in England to return to the United States.
- April 6 – Publication in London of the American Ezra Pound's poetry collection Cathay, "translations... for the most part of the Chinese of Rihaku, from the notes of the late Ernest Fenollosa, and the decipherings of the Professors Mori and Ariga", by Elkin Mathews.
- April 24 – Deportation of Armenian notables from Istanbul begins. Among deported poets killed as part of the Armenian genocide are Ardashes Harutiunian, Jacques Sayabalian, Ruben Sevak and Siamanto.
- c. May – Publication of the first modern book illustrated with wood engravings, Frances Cornford's Spring Morning (published by The Poetry Bookshop, London) with engravings by the poet's cousin Gwen Raverat.
- July – Others: A Magazine of the New Verse is founded by Alfred Kreymborg; it will run until 1917, publishing poetry, other writing and visual art.
- August–December – Ezra Pound is completing the first sections of his poem The Cantos.

=== Poets and World War I ===
see also "Deaths in World War I" in the "Deaths" section, below

- April 23 – English poet and writer Rupert Brooke, having sailed on February 28 with the British Mediterranean Expeditionary Force for the Gallipoli campaign, dies age 27 on a hospital ship of streptococcal sepsis from an infected mosquito bite off the Greek island of Skyros in the Aegean, where he is buried this evening with fellow poet Patrick Shaw-Stewart in charge of the firing party. Brooke came to public attention as a war poet on March 11 when The Times Literary Supplement published two sonnets ("IV: The Dead" and "V: The Soldier"); the latter was then read from the pulpit of St Paul's Cathedral on Easter Sunday (April 4). His collection of poetry, containing all five sonnets, 1914 & Other Poems, is first published posthumously in May and runs to 11 further impressions this year alone.
- May 13 – While English poet Julian Grenfell stands talking with other officers, a shell lands a few yards away and a splinter hits him in the head. He is taken to a hospital in Boulogne, where he dies 13 days later. His poem "Into Battle" is published in The Times (London) the day after his death. His younger brother Gerald William (Billy) Grenfell is killed in action 2 months later.
- August 3–4 – English poet and lance corporal F. W. Harvey undertakes an action of "conspicuous gallantry" while fighting in France for which he is awarded the Distinguished Conduct Medal.
- September – Blaise Cendrars, pen name of Frédéric Louis Sauser, a Swiss-born novelist and poet serving with the French Foreign Legion, loses his right arm in action.
- September 11 – Publication of Lucy Whitmell's poem "Christ in Flanders" in The Spectator.
- Expatriate Belgian poet Émile Cammaerts' poems are published in London by John Lane The Bodley Head as Belgian poems: chants patriotiques et autres poèmes in French with English translations by his wife, Tita Brand-Cammaerts.

== Works published in English ==
=== Australia ===
- C. J. Dennis, long poem The Songs of a Sentimental Bloke, after serialization in The Bulletin since 1909, Australia
- Henry Lawson, My Army, o my Army! and other Songs, Australia
- Shaw Neilson, Old Granny Sullivan, Sydney, Bookfellow, Australia

=== Canada ===
- Arthur Stanley Bourinot, Laurentian Lyrics and Other Poems
- John McCrae, "In Flanders Fields", a war memorial poem, is written on May 3 after McCrae's friend and former student, Lt. Alexis Helmer, was killed in battle (McCrae himself would not survive the war); later in the year the poem is published in Punch (Canadian poet published in the United Kingdom; see text of poem, above)
- Robert W. Norwood, His Lady of the Sonnets
- Duncan Campbell Scott, Lines in Memory of Edmund Morris
- Frederick George Scott, The Gates of Time, and Other Poems (London: Samuel Bagster & Sons.

=== United Kingdom ===
From My Boy Jack
by Rudyard Kipling

“Has any one else had word of him?”
Not this tide.
For what is sunk will hardly swim,
Not with this wind blowing, and this tide.

“Oh, dear, what comfort can I find?”
None this tide,
Nor any tide,
Except he did not shame his kind —
Not even with that wind blowing, and that tide.

- Richard Aldington, Images 1910-15
- Rupert Brooke, 1914 & Other Poems
- G. K. Chesterton, Poems
- Frances Cornford, Spring Morning
- John Drinkwater, Swords and Ploughshares
- T. S. Eliot, The Love Song of J. Alfred Prufrock published in Poetry magazine in Chicago (June), then, later this year, in a book in the United Kingdom
- F. S. Flint, Cadences
- Wilfrid Gibson, Battle
- Thomas Hardy, "The Convergence of the Twain, lines on the loss of the Titanic"
- Ford Madox Hueffer, Antwerp
- Violet Jacob, Songs of Angus, Scottish poet
- Rudyard Kipling
  - The Fringes of the Fleet, essays and poems
  - "My Boy Jack", written after his beloved son, John (called Jack) goes missing in the Battle of Loos during World War I; years later, Jack's death is confirmed to Kipling and his family; a play and film with the same title are later created, based on the Kipling family's loss
- Ronald Knox, Absolute and Abitofhell, first published in Oxford Magazine (November 28, 1912); satirical verse on Foundations, 1912
- Richard Le Gallienne, The Silk-Hat Soldier, and Other Poems
- Francis Ledwidge, Songs of the Fields, Irish author published in the United Kingdom

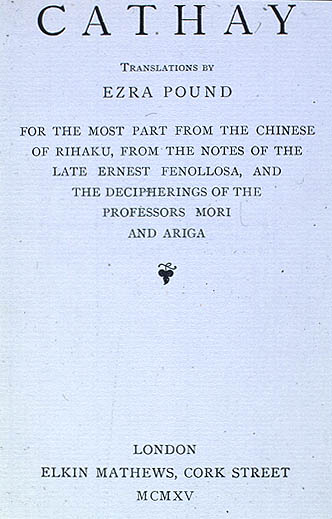
Ezra Pound's Cathay, published this year

- John McCrae, "In Flanders Fields", a war memorial poem, is written on May 3 after McCrae's friend and former student, Lt. Alexis Helmer, was killed in battle (McCrae himself would not survive the war); later in the year the poem is published in Punch (Canadian poet published in the United Kingdom)
- James Pittendrigh Macgillivray, Pro Patria, Scottish poet
- Irene R. McLeod, Songs to Save a Soul
- Alice Meynell, Poems of the War
- Jessie Pope, Jessie Pope's War Poems and More War Poems
- Ezra Pound, Cathay, American poet published in the United Kingdom
- Hardwicke Rawnsley, The European War 1914-1915: Poems
- Herbert Read, Songs of Chaos
- George William Russell, ("Æ"):
  - Gods of War, with Other Poems
  - Imaginations and Reveries
- Edith Sitwell, The Mother and Other Poems
- James Stephens, Irish author published in the United Kingdom:
  - The Adventures of Seumas Beg: The Rocky Road to Dublin
  - Songs from the Clay
- J. R. R. Tolkien, "Goblin Feet", published in Oxford Poetry
- Katharine Tynan, Flower of Youth: poems in war time
- Anna Wickham, The Contemplative Quarry

==== Anthologies ====
- H. B. Elliott, ed., Lest We Forget: A War Anthology
- Poems of Today
- Ezra Pound, ed., Catholic Anthology, London
- War Poems from The Times, August 1914-1915

==== Some Imagist Poets anthology ====
Contents to Some Imagist Poets anthology, the first of three books with the same title published in the next two years (includes English and American poets):

- Richard Aldington: "Childhood", "The Poplar", "Round-Pond", "Daisy", "Epigrams", "The Faun sees Snow for the First Time", "Lemures"
- H.D. (Hilda Doolittle): "The Pool", "The Garden", "Sea Lily", "Sea Iris", "Sea Rose", "Oread", "Orion Dead"
- John Gould Fletcher: "The Blue Symphony", "London Excursion"
- F. S. Flint: "Trees", "Lunch", "Malady", "Accident", "Fragment", "Houses", "Eau-Forte"
- D. H. Lawrence: "Ballad of Another Ophelia", "Illicit", "Fireflies in the Corn", "A Woman and Her Dead Husband", "The Mowers", "Scent of Irises", "Green"
- Amy Lowell: "Venus Transiens", "The Travelling Bear", "The Letter", "Grotesque", "Bullion", "Solitaire", "The Bombardment"

=== United States ===
See also "Some Imagist Poets" subsection, above

- Djuna Barnes, The Book of Repulsive Women, her first book of poems, which she described as a collection of "rhythms and drawings"
- Stephen Vincent Benét, Five Men and Pompey
- Adelaide Crapsey, Verse, featuring her invention of the quintain, a five-line form
- Gladys Cromwell, The Gates of Utterance and Other Poems
- T. S. Eliot, The Love Song of J. Alfred Prufrock first published in Poetry magazine
- John Gould Fletcher, Irradiations: Sand and Spray
- Ring Lardner, Bib Ballads
- Archibald MacLeish, Songs for a Summer's Day
- Edgar Lee Masters, Spoon River Anthology
- John G. Neihardt, The Song of Hugh Glass
- Ezra Pound:
  - Cathay, American poet published in the United Kingdom
  - Editor, Catholic Anthology, London
- Sara Teasdale, Rivers to the Sea

=== Other in English ===
- Roby Datta, Indian poet writing in English:
  - Poems: Pictures and Songs to which is prefixed "The Philosophy of Art" Calcutta: Das Gupta and Co.
  - Stories in blank verse to which is added an epic fragment, Calcutta: Das Gupta & Co.
- Francis Ledwidge, Songs of the Fields, Irish author published in the United Kingdom
- James Stephens, Irish author published in the United Kingdom:
  - The Adventures of Seumas Beg; The Rocky Road to Dublin
  - Songs from the Clay

== Works published in other languages ==
=== France ===
- Guillaume Apollinaire, pen name of Wilhelm Apollinaris de Kostrowitzky, Case d'armons
- Paul Claudel, Corona benignitatis anni dei
- Oscar Vladislas de Lubicz-Milosz, also known as O. V. de L. Milosz, Poèmes
- Pierre Reverdy, Poèmes en prose

=== Other languages ===
- José de Almada Negreiros, A Cena do Ódio ("The Scene of Hate"), Portuguese
- Walter Flex, Sonne und Schilde, German
- Yvan Goll, Élegies internationales: Pamphlets contre la guerre, German poet in Switzerland writing in French
- Uri Zvi Greenberg, Ergets oyf felder ("Somewhere in the fields"), Yiddish published in Austria-Hungary
- Sir Muhammad Iqbal, Asrar-i-Khudi (Urdu: اسرار خودی) or The Secrets of the Self his first philosophical book of poetry, published in Persian
- Vasily Kamensky, Stenka Razin (Стенька Разин), Russian
- Wilhelm Klemm, Gloria: Kriegsgedichte aus dem Felde, German
- Vladimir Mayakovsky, A Cloud in Trousers (Oblako v shtanakh), Russian
- Narasinghrao, Smaranasamhita, an elegy to his son, Indian, writing in Gujarati
- Barbu Nemțeanu, Stropi de soare, Romanian
- Georg Trakl, Sebastian im Traum ("Sebastian in the Dream"); Austrian poet published in Germany

== Awards and honors ==
- Nobel Prize for Literature: Romain Rolland (French)

== Births ==
Death years link to the corresponding "[year] in poetry" article:

- January 8 – Mira Mendelson (died 1968), Russian poet, writer, translator and librettist
- January 12 – Margaret Danner (died 1984), African-American
- January 15 – Chaganti Somayajulu (died 1994), Indian, Telugu-language short-story writer and poet
- January 31 – Thomas Merton (died 1968), American poet, author and monk
- March 12 – José Luis Rodríguez Vélez (died 1984), Panamanian composer, orchestra director, saxophonist, clarinetist and guitarist
- April 21 – John Manifold (died 1985), Australian
- April 22 – Hem Barua (died 1977), Indian, Assamese-language poet and politician
- May 28 – Dorothy Auchterlonie (died 1991), Australian
- May 30 – Michael Thwaites (died 2005), Australian poet, academic, intelligence officer and activist
- May 31 – Judith Wright (died 2000), Australian
- June 8
  - Kayyar Kinhanna Rai (died 2015), Indian
  - Ruth Stone (died 2011), American poet, recipient of 2002 National Book Award and 2002 Wallace Stevens Award
- June 24 – Niall Montgomery (died 1987), Irish architect, artist, writer, translator and poet
- July 1 – Alun Lewis (killed 1944 on active service), Welsh war poet
- July 7 – Margaret Walker (died 1998), African-American poet and novelist
- July 16 – David Campbell (died 1979), Australian
- August – Bawa Balwant (died 1973), Indian, Punjabi poet
- August 4 – Patrick Anderson (died 1979), English-born Canadian
- August 28 – Claude Roy, pen name of Claude Orland (died 1997), French poet, novelist, essayist, art critic and journalist; an activist in the Communist Party until his expulsion in 1956
- September 5 – Maheswar Neog (died 1995), Indian, Assamese-language scholar and poet
- November 3 – Eric Roach (suicide 1974), Caribbean poet from Tobago
- November 8 – George Sutherland Fraser (died 1980), Scottish-born poet and critic
- December 8 – Nikos Gatsos (died 1992), Greek
- December 22 – David Martin (died 1997), Australian
- December 27 – John Cornford (killed 1936 in Spanish Civil War), English
- December 31 – Sam Ragan (died 1996), American poet and journalist, North Carolina Poet Laureate, 1982–1996
- Also:
  - Nanina Alba (died 1968), African-American
  - Akhtarul Imam, Indian, Urdu-language poet in the "Halqa-i-Arba-i Zauq" movement
  - K. S. Narasimha Swami, better known as "K.S. NA", Indian, Kannada-language poet
  - Manmohan, pen name of Natu Gopal Narhar, Indian, Marathi-language poet
  - Nand Lal Ambardar (died 1973), Indian, Kashmiri-language poet
  - Palagummi Padmaraju (died 1983), short-story writer, poet, film-industry writer
  - Prabhu Chugani, "Wafa", Indian, Sindhi-language poet
  - Rameshvar Shukla, pen name: Anchal, wrote in Khadi Boli and Braj Bhasa dialects of Hindi, poet, short-story writer and novelist
  - Sumitra Kumari Sinha, Indian, Hindi-language poet and short-story writer

== Deaths ==
Birth years link to the corresponding "[year] in poetry" article:

- January 3 – James Elroy Flecker (born 1884), English poet, novelist and dramatist, from tuberculosis in Switzerland
- February 8 – Takashi Nagatsuka 長塚 節 (born 1879), Japanese poet and novelist
- July 10 – Vazha-Pshavela (died 1861), Georgian poet
- September 4 – Helen Hinsdale Rich (born 1827), American poet
- December 1 – Stuart Merrill (born 1863), American Symbolist poet writing in French, from heart disease
- Also
  - Hortensia Antommarchi (born 1850), Colombian poet
  - Edmond Laforest (born 1876), Haitian French language poet, suicide
  - V. C. Balakrishna Panikker (born 1889), Indian, Malayalam-language poet

=== Killed in World War I ===
see also "Poets and World War I" in the "Events" section and Rudyard Kipling poem "My Boy Jack", above

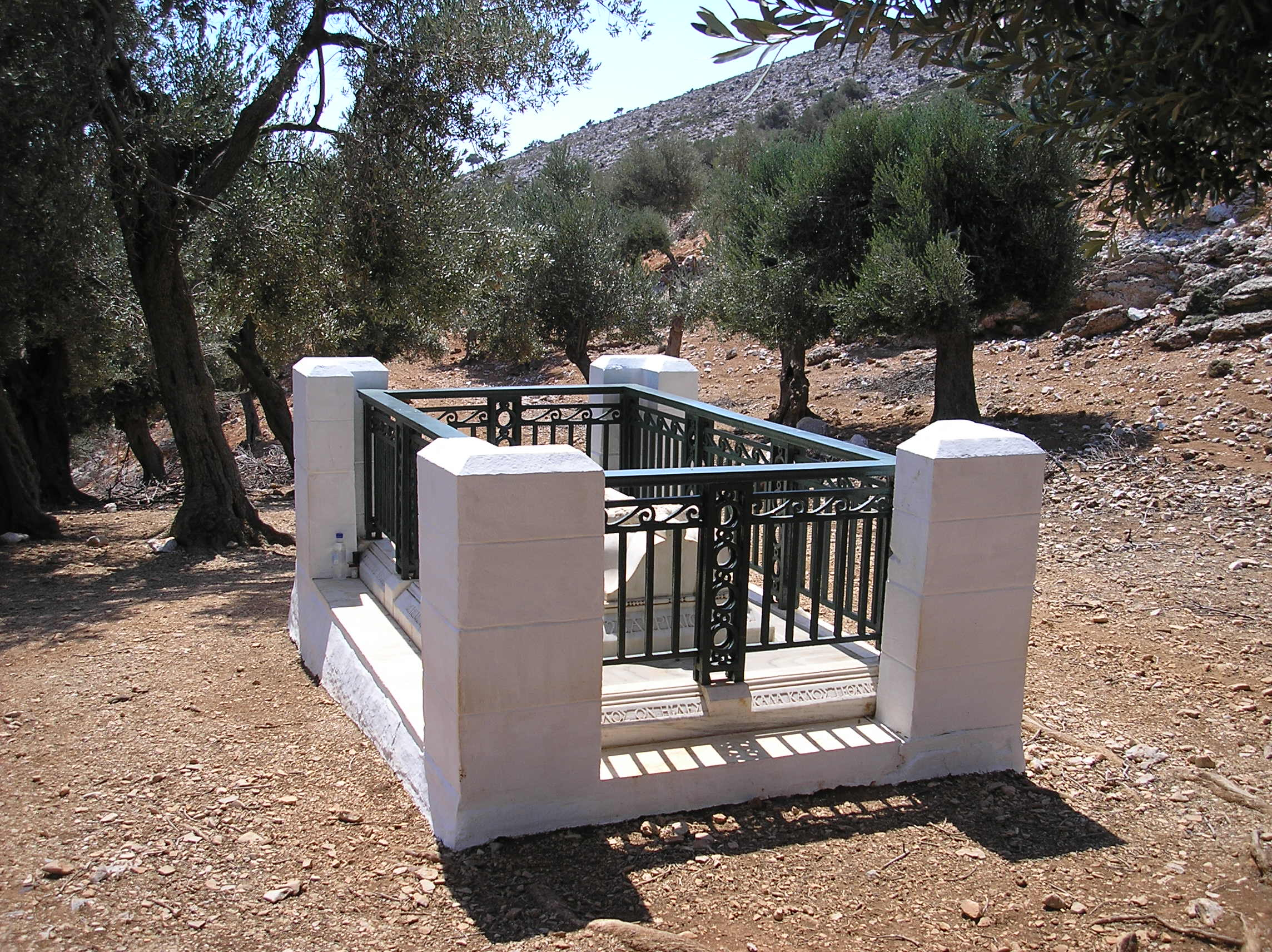
Grave of Rupert Brooke on Skyros Island, Greece

- April 23
  - Rupert Brooke, English poet and writer, 27, of infection on military service
  - Robert W. Sterling, Scottish poet, 21, killed in action
- May 8 – Walter Lyon, Scottish war poet, 28, missing in action
- May 26 – Julian Grenfell, English war poet, 27, killed at Ypres
- July 30 – Gerald William Grenfell, English war poet, 25, killed in action
- September 1 – August Stramm, German poet and playwright, 41, killed in action on the Eastern Front
- October 13 – Charles Sorley, British poet, 20, shot in the head by a sniper, at the Battle of Loos in France
- December 23 – Roland Leighton, English war poet, 20, dies of wounds in Casualty Clearing Station at Louvencourt, having been shot through the stomach by a sniper at Hébuterne

== See also ==
- List of years in poetry
- Dada
- Imagism
- Modernist poetry in English
- Silver Age of Russian Poetry
- Ego-Futurism movement in Russian poetry
- Expressionism movement in German poetry
- Young Poland (Polish: Młoda Polska) modernist period in Polish arts and literature
- Poetry
