= My Boy Jack (film) =

- DVD cover
- Based on: My Boy Jack by David Haig
- Written by: David Haig
- Directed by: Brian Kirk
- Starring: David Haig; Daniel Radcliffe; Kim Cattrall; Carey Mulligan; Julian Wadham
- Music by: Adrian Johnston
- Country of origin: United Kingdom
- Original language: English

Production
- Producer: Michael Casey
- Cinematography: David Odd, B.S.C.
- Editor: Tim Murrell
- Running time: 93 minutes

Original release
- Network: ITV1
- Release: 11 November 2007

My Boy Jack is a 2007 British biographical television film based on David Haig's 1997 play of the same name for ITV. It was filmed in August 2007, with Haig as Rudyard Kipling and Daniel Radcliffe as John Kipling. The American television premiere was on 20 April 2008 on PBS, with primetime rebroadcast on 27 March 2011. The film attracted about 5.7 million viewers on its original ITV broadcast in the UK on Remembrance Day, 11 November 2007.

== Background ==
My Boy Jack is based on the 1997 play by English actor David Haig. It tells the story of Rudyard Kipling and his grief for his son, John, who died in the First World War. The title comes from Kipling's poem of the same name. The fictionalized 4-person "Propaganda Committee," is based on the real work of Wellington House and the Admiralty, War Office and Press Committee.

The theatre piece played at the Theatre Royal, Nottingham, in 2004. It then toured Oxford, Richmond, Brighton, Norwich, Cardiff and Cambridge, with the newly formed Haig Lang Productions. In America, My Boy Jack has been performed under the title My Son Jack.

== Plot ==
As the Great War (World War I) begins, 17-year-old Jack Kipling (Daniel Radcliffe), the only son of the famous English writer and poet Rudyard Kipling, declares his intention to join the Royal Navy to fight against the Germans. The elder Kipling (Haig), who encourages him in his ambition, arranges several appointments for him to enlist in both the Army and Navy. However, when Jack's poor eyesight prevents him from passing the medical examinations, both he and his father are devastated. Determined, Rudyard uses his influence with the military establishment to eventually secure Jack an officer's commission as a Second Lieutenant in the Irish Guards.

Jack's mother, Carrie (Cattrall), and his sister, Elsie (Carey Mulligan), disapprove of this post, as they do not wish for him to go to the war. Jack, who proves to be a popular officer with his troops, undergoes military training and travels to France within six months. On his 18th birthday, Jack receives orders to lead his platoon into action on the following morning. During the Battle of Loos, Jack is posted missing in action and the Kipling family is informed by telegram. For three years, Jack's parents track down and interview surviving members of his platoon. One eventually confirms that Jack was killed in the Battle of Loos, shot by enemy gunfire, after losing his glasses in the mud during an assault on a German machine-gun post.

== Cast ==
- David Haig as Rudyard Kipling
- Daniel Radcliffe as John Kipling
- Kim Cattrall as Caroline Kipling
- Carey Mulligan as Elsie "Bird" Kipling
- Martin McCann as Bowe
- Julian Wadham as King George V
- Richard Dormer as Corporal O'Leary
- Ruaidhri Conroy as Guardsman McHugh
- Laurence Kinlan as Guardsman Doyle
- Nick Dunning as Colonel Ferguson
- Bill Milner as Peter Carter
- Peter Hanly as Major Sparks
- Fred Ridgeway as Mr Frankland
- Lucy Miller as Mrs Carter
- Michael McElhatton as Leo Amery MP
- Peter Gowen as H. A. Gwynne
- Michael Grennel as Commander Egan
- Ciaran Nolan as Daly
- Sean O'Neil as Mr Relph
- Bosco Hogan as Colonel Brooks
- Adam Goodwin as Captain Bruce
- Peter O'Meara as Captain Viney
- John-Paul MacLeod as Ralph
- David Heap as Colonel Hayden
- Billy Gibson as Maitland
- Robbie Kay as Authur Relph
- Fred Ridgeway as Hobdon
- Chris McHallem as Mr Lieuenthal
- Jason Maza as Journalist

== Filming ==
Filmed on location in Counties Laois and Kildare, Ireland with one scene in the Olympia Theatre, Dublin. Exterior scenes for film were shot at Bateman's, the 17th-century house that was Kipling's home from 1902 to his death in 1936, which is now a National Trust property.

== Reception ==
Reviews of the film were generally positive. On review aggregator website Rotten Tomatoes, the film holds an approval rating of 71% based on 14 reviews, and an average rating of 6.7/10. The website's critical consensus reads, " While the script may lack insight and excitement, My Boy Jack features strong performances from Daniel Radcliffe and Kim Cattrall that alone make it worth watching." The aggregate Metacritic score was 78/100, with positive reviews from Entertainment Weekly, the Boston Globe, Variety, the Orlando Sentinel, the New York Post, The Hollywood Reporter, the Los Angeles Times, the San Francisco Chronicle and the Chicago Tribune, and with more negative reviews from Philadelphia Daily News, The New York Times and The Wall Street Journal. Several reviews took note of Daniel Radcliffe's starring role as Jack. Both Radcliffe and Haig were generally well-received, though Kim Cattrall received mixed reviews for her performance as Jack's mother.

== Awards ==
It won Silver Magnolia Award for Best Television Film at the 14th Shanghai Television Festival in China.
