= St Andrew's Church, Wimpole =

Church in Wimpole, Cambridgeshire, England

Coordinates: 52°08′28″N 0°02′55″W

St Andrew's Church, Wimpole is a Grade II* listed building in Wimpole, Cambridgeshire, England. It remains an active parish church within the Orwell Group of Parishes, holding services on the first and third Sundays of each month.

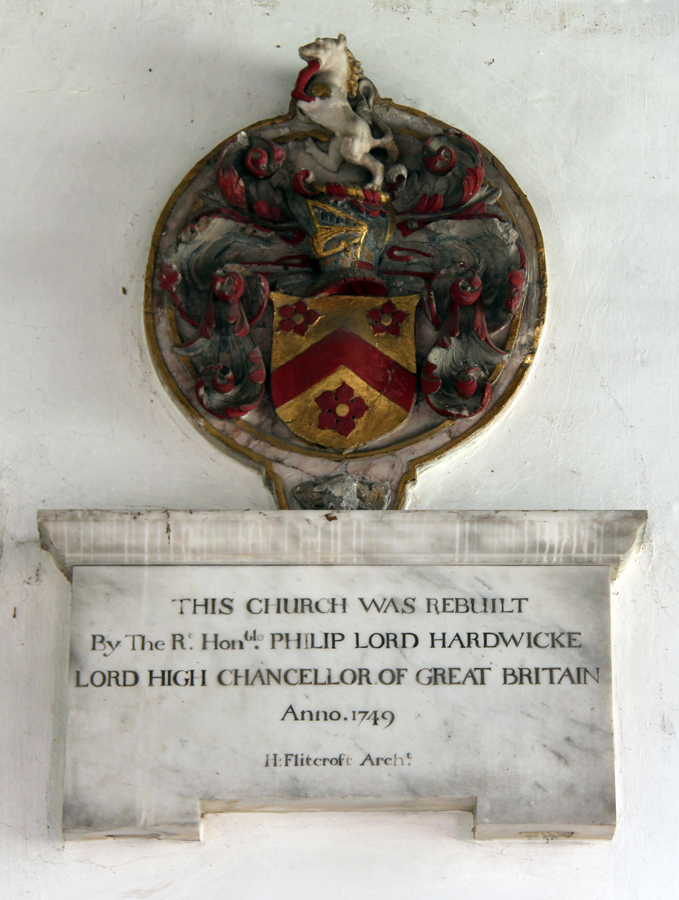

The church is next-door to Wimpole Hall, the largest house in Cambridgeshire. The church dates from medieval times but the current building is mainly the result of a rebuilding project in the 18th century carried out by one of the owners of the hall, the Earl of Hardwicke. The Earl's architect was Henry Flitcroft, who demolished the medieval church on the site apart from the north chapel (sometimes known as the Chicheley Chantry), which was incorporated in the new building.

The part of the church nearest the house is faced in stone, but the rest of the structure is mainly in red brick.

There are a number of monuments in the church including one by John Flaxman. A stained-glass window commemorates Thomas Agar-Robartes, one of a number of MPs who were killed in World War I, and his mother Mary, Viscountess Clifton. In the graveyard is a monument to Elsie Bambridge, the daughter of Rudyard Kipling, who left Wimpole Hall to the National Trust.

== Organ ==
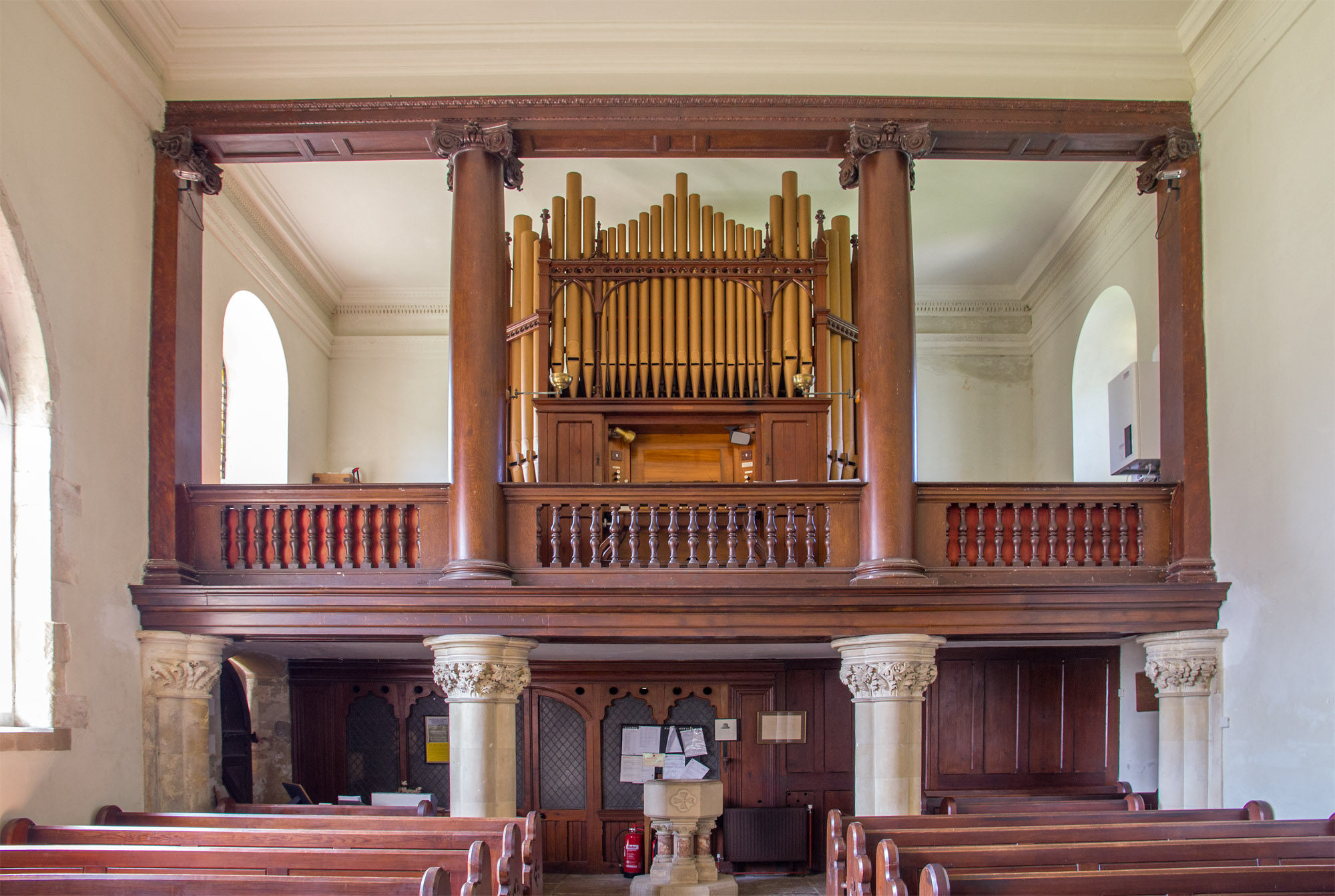
The organ in its gallery. Note the gold display pipes.

There is an organ in the west gallery. When it was inspected for the National Pipe Organ Register in the 1980s, it was not possible to date the case, but it contained a 19th-century Brindley & Foster instrument "in a dreadful state". The organ has since been rebuilt, using material salvaged from another instrument. It still retains the diapason pipes from the Brindley & Foster organ.

== Access ==
The Wimpole Estate is managed by the National Trust as a tourist attraction, but the church does not belong to the Trust.
