= Fred Ridgeway =

Irish actor (1953–2012)

Fred Ridgeway

Frederick Gerrard Ridgeway (16 October 1953 – 12 November 2012) was an Irish-born stage and television actor. He began his professional life pursuing a career as a money broker, but at the age of 42, he decided to take up professional acting. He performed in a variety of stage productions across the UK, including several Richard Bean plays and a number of Royal Shakespeare Company productions. His final role was as Charlie Clench in One Man, Two Guvnors, which toured the UK as well as appearing in Broadway theatre. Prior to its Broadway run, Ridgeway was diagnosed with motor neurone disease, from which he died in November 2012.

== Early life and career ==
Fred Ridgeway was born into a Catholic family in Dublin, Ireland on 16 October 1953. He was the youngest son of railway worker Benjamin Ridgeway and Christine née McCormack. The family later moved to Peckham in south-east London, as his father worked at Peckham Rye station.

Ridgeway's first serious experience of acting came when he was a student at St Thomas the Apostle College, Nunhead. Actively encouraged by his A Level English teacher, Terry O'Brien, he joined the National Youth Theatre.

Ridgeway did not immediately enter the acting profession, however; at the age of 18 he began a career in finance. After 25 years, he held the position of associate director at Exco. During his time working in finance in New York, Ridgeway attended theatre classes at the Actors' Playhouse in Greenwich Village.

When Ridgeway returned to Britain, living in Chislehurst, he was active in amateur dramatics, performing with the South London Theatre in West Norwood and the Geoffrey Whitworth Theatre in Crayford, Kent.

== Acting career ==
In 1996, at the age of 42, Ridgeway left his job as a money broker and decided to take up acting professionally. His first role was as an understudy for Tim Pigott-Smith in a National Theatre production of The Alchemist at the Birmingham Repertory Theatre. His professional London debut was in David Haig's My Boy Jack at the Hampstead Theatre in 1997. The following year, he appeared in productions of Dealer's Choice, Saturday, Sunday, Monday and Loot. In Loot, a black comedy by Joe Orton, he was praised by critics for his performance as Truscott of the Yard. The Sunday Times reviewer John Peter enjoyed his "darkly funny performance, beautifully detailed but never fussy". For James Christopher, Ridgeway offered a "play-saving performance" in the vein of the character Basil Fawlty from Fawlty Towers.

In the mid-1990s, Ridgeway began appearing in television series such as The Bill, Heartbeat, EastEnders, Midsomer Murders and Casualty.

In 2003, Ridgeway appeared in Absolutely! (Perhaps) at Wyndham's. He also performed in a number of Royal Shakespeare Company productions, including the parts of Enobarbus in Antony and Cleopatra (2006), Sicinius Velutus in Coriolanus (2007) and Egeon in The Comedy of Errors (2010).

From 2008, he appeared in a series of Richard Bean plays, namely The English Game (2008), England People Very Nice (2009), The Big Fellah (2010) and One Man, Two Guvnors (2011–12). His portrayal of an IRA member in The Big Fellah was described by a reviewer in The Guardian as "utterly terrifying". In One Man, Two Guvnors, he played Charlie Clench, a criminal, a part which was written by Bean specifically for Ridgeway to play. Ridgeway was part of the cast when the play opened in May 2011 in the South Bank and remained in the cast as the production toured the UK and travelled to Broadway.

== Personal life ==
Ridgeway married Jeanne in 1983. They had two children, Sarah and Benjamin. His children have also been involved as professional actors; Sarah appeared in the long running BBC daytime drama Doctors and has the lead role in award-winning Radio 4 series Life Lines; Benjamin appeared in the films The New Adventures of Pinocchio and About a Boy.

== Death ==
Ridgeway was diagnosed with motor neurone disease prior to the five-month run of One Man, Two Guvnors in New York City. He continued in the play, missing only two performances, and tried to keep his illness hidden from most of his colleagues. Although his tiredness off-stage caused fellow cast members to suspect there was something wrong, they only became aware of his illness after the Broadway run of the play was completed. James Corden, who played the lead role, explained: "When we got to New York, a lot of us in the cast started to realise he was unwell, but he never missed a beat. He never missed a cue, an entrance, a line." Ridgeway died from motor neurone disease in London on 12 November 2012, aged 59.

== Selected work ==
=== Theatre ===
| Year(s) of appearance | Production | Role |
|---|---|---|
| 1997 | My Boy Jack by David Haig Hampstead Theatre, London | Mr Frankland |
| 1998 | Dealer's Choice by Patrick Marber West Yorkshire Playhouse, Leeds | |
| 1998 | Saturday, Sunday, Monday by Eduardo De Filippo Chichester Festival Theatre | Luigi |
| 1998 | Loot by Joe Orton Chichester Minerva / Vaudeville Theatre | Truscott of the Yard |
| 1999 | The Impostor by Peter Lawson The Drum Theatre, Plymouth | Orgon |
| 2001 | Spinning into Butter by Rebecca Gilman Royal Court Theatre, London | Meyers |
| 2001 | The Price by Arthur Miller Octagon Theatre, Bolton | Victor |
| 2001 | The Weir by Conor McPherson Royal Court Theatre, London | Jim |
| 2008 | The English Game by Richard Bean Yvonne Arnaud Theatre, Guildford | Reg |
| 2009 | England People Very Nice by Richard Bean National Theatre | Laurie |
| 2010 | The Big Fellah by Richard Bean | McArdle |
| 2011–12 | One Man, Two Guvnors by Richard Bean Haymarket, London/Music Box Theatre, New York | Charlie Clench |
