= Wimpole's Folly =

Folly in Wimpole, Cambridgeshire, England

Coordinates: 52°9′2″N 0°3′2″W

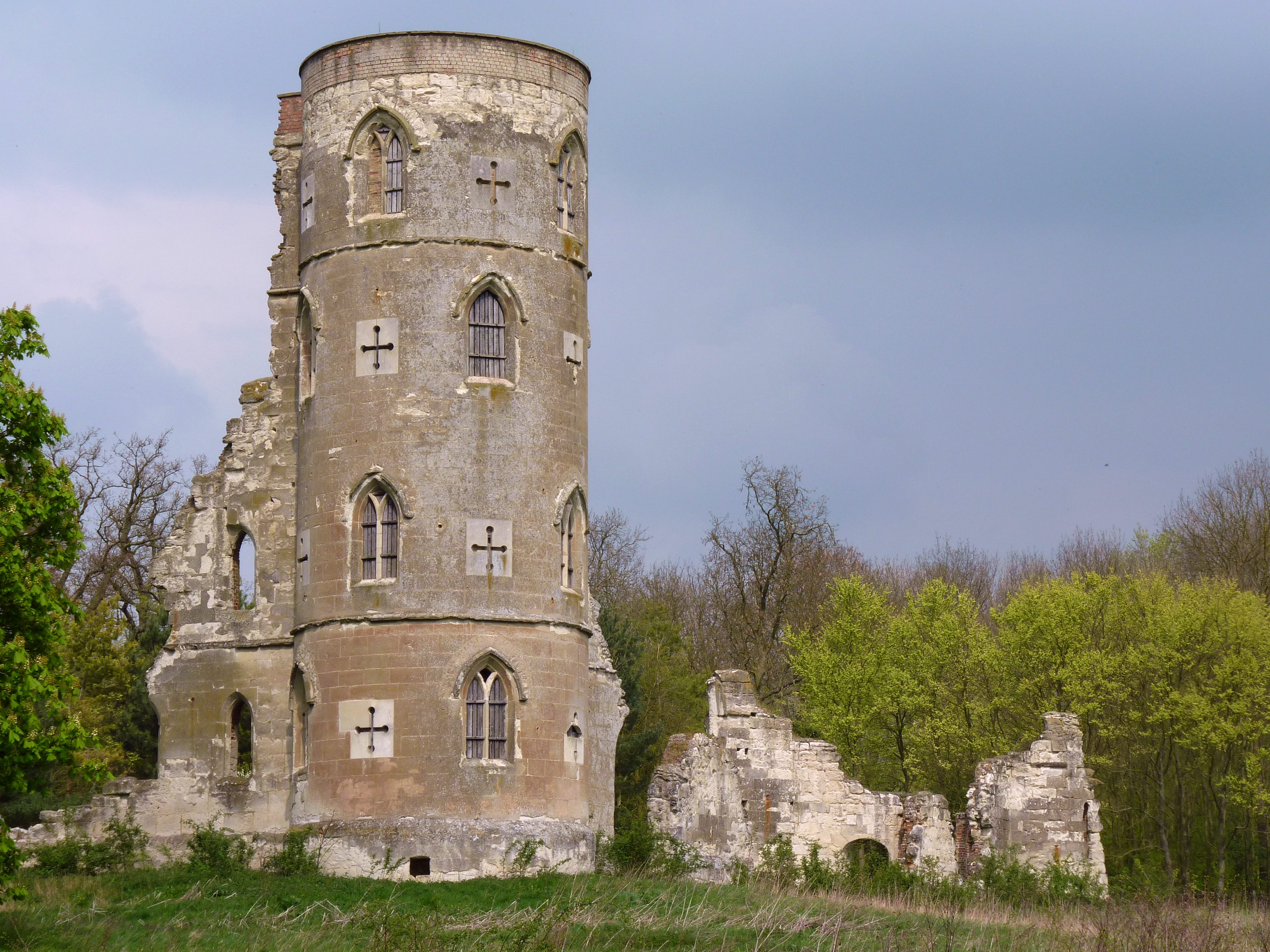
Mock semi-ruined castle designed by Miller, in the grounds of Wimpole Hall

Wimpole's Folly is a folly ruin located in the grounds of Wimpole Hall, in the parish of Wimpole, in Cambridgeshire, England. The folly is designed to resemble the ruins of a medieval castle.

It was built on the grounds of Wimpole Hall in the mid-1770s at the order of Philip Yorke, 2nd Earl of Hardwicke, the then owner of Wimpole Hall. The Earl of Hardwicke commissioned Sanderson Miller (the noted follies architect of the day) to design the folly in 1751, to then have it later built by Capability Brown in 1769. The folly is Grade II* listed on the National Heritage List for England.

The ruins are substantially built and stretch for two hundred feet in length, and include a four-storey Gothic tower. They, and Wimpole Hall, are owned by the National Trust and are open to the public.

The folly includes an inscription titled "The Ruin at Wimpole", a poem which references medieval history and celebrates British liberties, reflecting on the past before the focus changing midway to the present, and reflecting on lifestyle. The same inscription is contained in Wrestiana, a manuscript created by Philip and Jemima Yorke (Philip's wife) and their group of friends whilst they resided at Wrest Park. The manuscript includes poems, plays and inscriptions. In the manuscript the inscription is signed W. P., ‘W’ for Wray (Philip's friend was Daniel Wray) and ‘P’ for Philip.

During the 19th and early 20th centuries the tower was occupied by workers from Wimpole Hall. The folly had deteriorated over time, with the National Trust carrying out conservation work. The restoration was recognised by the European Heritage Europa Nostra Awards, and included structural repairs, reinstating missing components and the stonework was stabilised. Funding for the restoration was obtained from Natural England and a bequest from Alec Clifton Taylor, with the National Trust also contributing to the cost.

The folly was featured in Slow Horses, season one, episode six, titled "Follies." A photograph of the folly taken by John Piper is held in the Tate archives.
