= Killed in action =

Classification of military personnel casualties

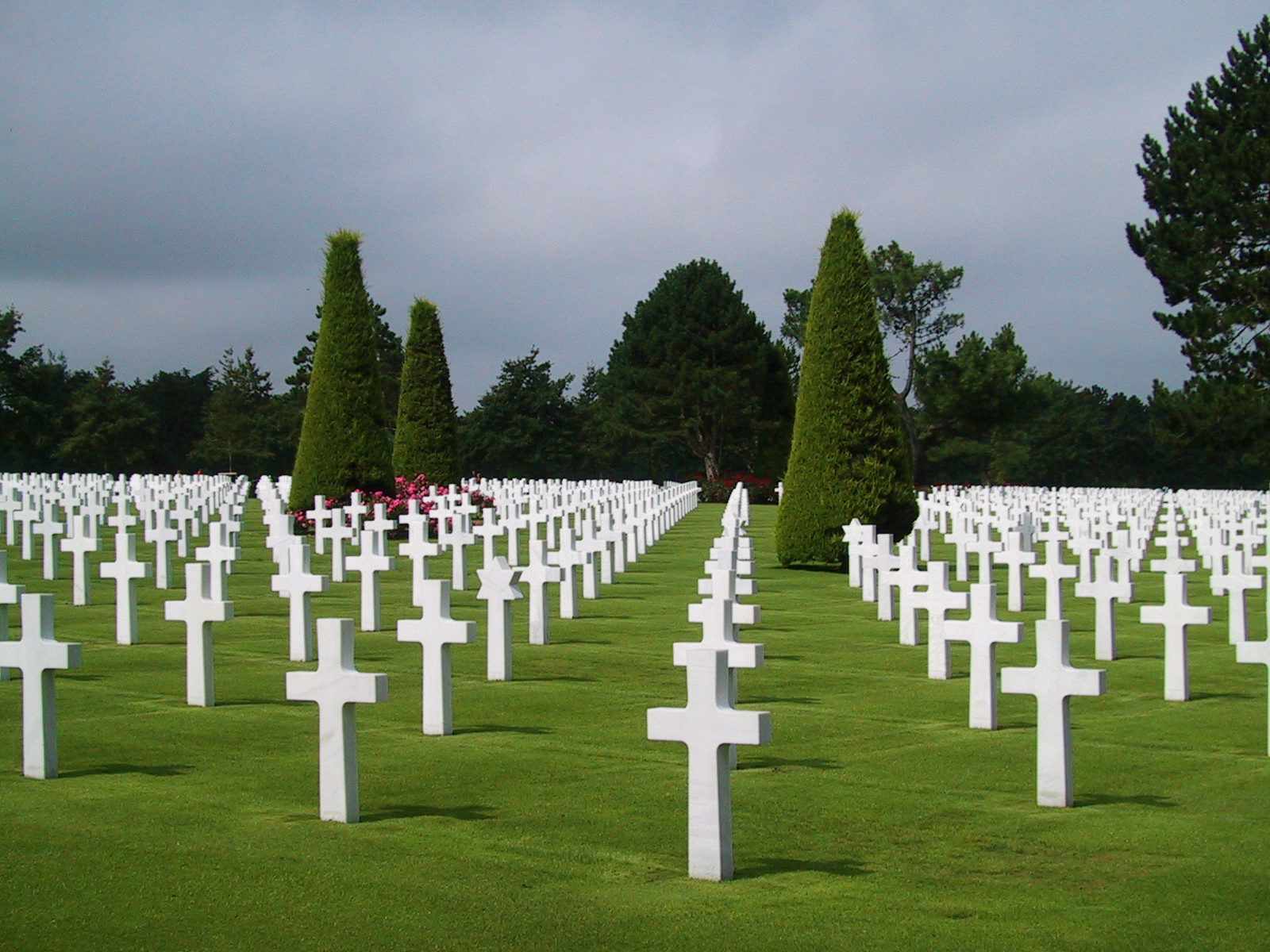
The Normandy American Cemetery and Memorial, near Colleville-sur-Mer, Normandy, France

Killed in action (KIA) is a casualty classification generally used by militaries to describe the deaths of their personnel at the hands of enemy or hostile forces at the moment of action. The United States Department of Defense, for example, says that those declared KIA did not need to have fired their weapons, but only to have been killed due to a hostile attack. KIAs include those killed by friendly fire during combat, but not from incidents such as accidental vehicle crashes, murder, or other non-hostile events or terrorism. KIA can be applied both to front-line combat troops and naval, air, and support forces.

== Died of wounds ==
Furthermore, the term died of wounds (DOW) is used to denote personnel who reached a medical treatment facility before dying. The category died of wounds received in action (DWRIA) is also used for combat-related casualties which occur after medical evacuation.

== Missing, presumed dead ==
PKIA means presumed killed in action. This term is used when personnel are lost in battle, initially listed missing in action (MIA), but after not being found, are later presumed to have not survived. This is typical of naval battles or engagements in other hostile environments where recovering bodies is difficult. A vast number of soldiers killed in action went unidentified in World War I, like John Kipling, the son of British poet Rudyard Kipling, prompting the formation of the Commonwealth War Graves Commission.

== NATO definition ==
NATO defines killed in action or a battle casualty as a combatant who is killed outright or who dies as a result of wounds or other injuries before reaching a medical treatment facility or help from comrades.

== See also ==
- Missing in action (MIA)
- Prisoner of war (POW)
- Wounded in action (WIA)
