= Magic (Haig play) =

2026 play

- Original language: English
- Written by: David Haig

Premiere
- Date: 24 April 2026
- Place: Chichester Festival Theatre

Magic is a play by David Haig about the relationship between illusionist Harry Houdini and author Sir Arthur Conan Doyle.

== Production history ==
The play was originally commissioned by Nicholas Hytner for the Bridge Theatre (London Theatre Company).

It was later announced that the play will have its world premiere at the Chichester Festival Theatre as part of the Festival 2026 announcement beginning previews on 24 April (with a press night on 5 May) running until 16 May 2026, starring Haig as Conan Doyle and Hadley Fraser as Houdini, directed by Lucy Bailey.
