= Nanina Alba =

American poet and professor

Nanina Alba (1915–1968) was an American poet, short-fiction writer and professor. She taught at Alabama State College (1947 to 1961), then at Tuskegee Institute, and authored jazz-inspired poetry collections Parchments (1963) and Parchments II (1967).

== Education and family life ==
Alba was born Nannie Williemenia Champey in 1915 in Montgomery, Alabama. She was the daughter of Rev. and Mrs. I.C.H. Champey. Alba attended Haines Institute then Knoxville College, earning an AB in 1935. She also studied at Indiana University and Alabama State College, at the latter earning an MA in education in 1955. She married Reuben Andres Alba on November 27, 1937, and they had two daughters, Andrea and Pan(chita) Adams (an illustrator).

== Career ==
Alba taught music, French, and English in Alabama public schools before becoming a university professor, first as a tenured member of the English department faculty at Alabama State College from 1947 to 1961, then as professor of English at Tuskegee Institute. A poet, jazz rhythms and black vernacular featured in her collections Parchments (1963) and Parchments II (1967); the latter was illustrated by her daughter Pan Adams with pen and ink drawings. Alba's poetry was also published in journals like Crisis, Phylon and Negro Digest. She wrote one of her first poems in 1929 when First Lady Lou Henry Hoover invited Jessie De Priest for tea at the White House; DePriest was the wife of the only African American member of Congress and Alba was angered by the criticism of the invitation. The Chicago Defender published the poem, which Alba had sent under the pseudonym Wilhelm Champes, fearing her father's disapproval, though later she found he had saved the clipping.

== Death ==
Alba died of cancer on June 24, 1968, at Macon County Hospital.
