= Wimpole =

Village in South Cambridgeshire, England

Coordinates: 52°07′51″N 0°01′56″W

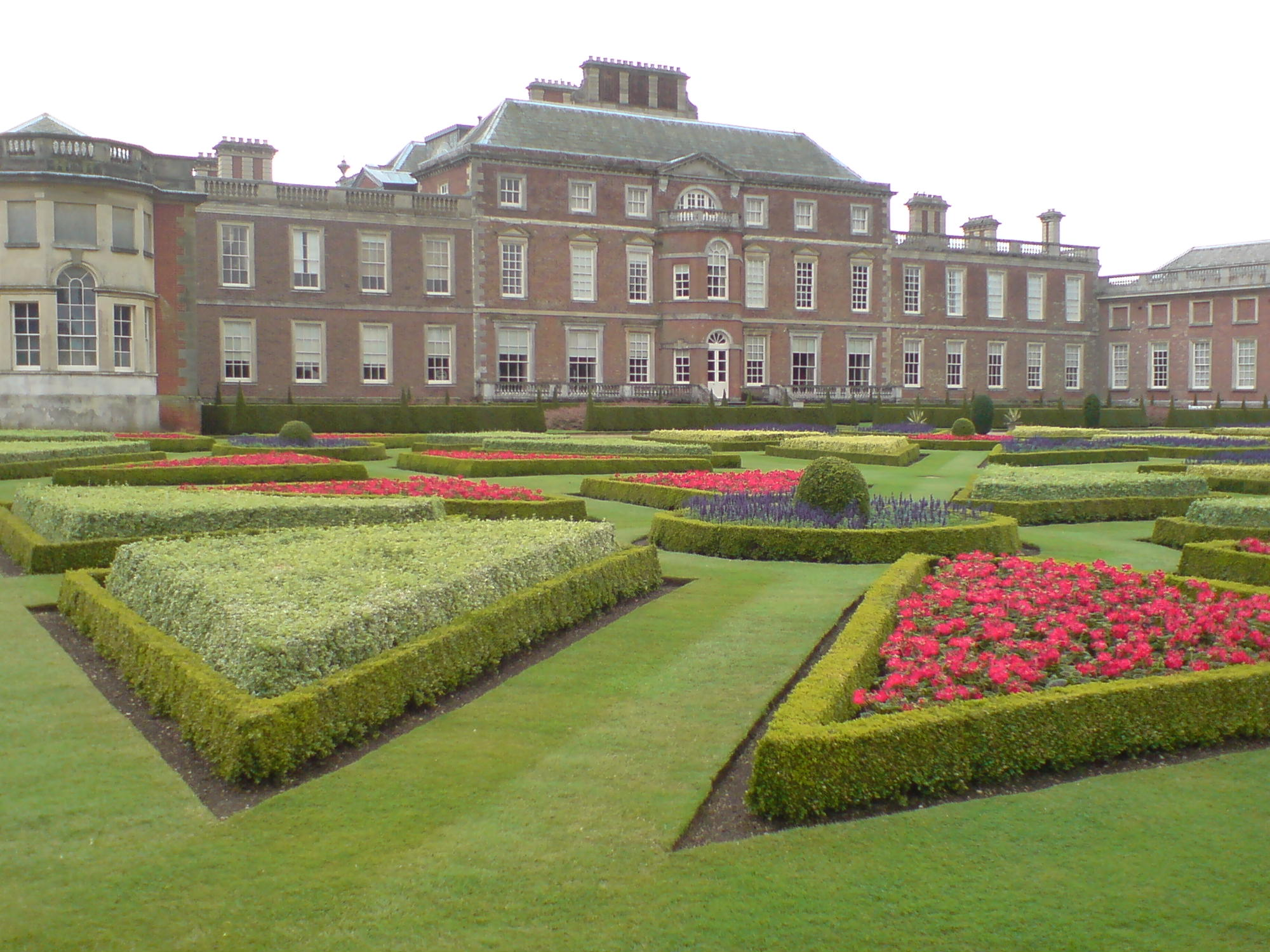

- Location within Cambridgeshire
- Population: 227 (2001); 301 (2011)
- OS grid reference: TL337509
- Civil parish: Wimpole
- District: South Cambridgeshire
- Shire county: Cambridgeshire
- Region: East
- Country: England
- Sovereign state: United Kingdom
- Post town: Royston
- Postcode district: SG8
- Dialling code: 01223

Wimpole is a small village and civil parish in South Cambridgeshire, England, about 8 1/2 miles (13.7 km) southwest of Cambridge. Until 1999, the main settlement on the A603 was officially known and signed as New Wimpole and Orwell, Cambridge Road. On 1 April 1999, following a parish boundary change and a referendum of local residents, the village name was simplified to Wimpole.

It is the site of the country house of Wimpole Hall and its accompanying Wimpole's Folly.

== History ==
The present village of Wimpole was founded around 1840 about a mile to the east of Ermine Street, either side of the Roman road that once linked Ermine Street to Cambridge (now the A603). A Roman settlement has been found in the parish on the site of the south-west lodge near Arrington Bridge.

Listed as Winepole in the Domesday Book of 1086, the parish formerly contained two other small settlements, Wratworth and Whitwell, but both had been absorbed into the single parish by the end of the 13th century, though the manor of Wratworth survived until the 17th century.

Wimpole is mentioned in a hypothesis which identifies the valley of the Bourn Brook, Cambridgeshire as the location of the Battle of Brunanburh fought in 937. The battle, the location of which is unknown and has been speculated to have taken place in over 40 locations from South West England to Scotland, is suggested to have taken place close to the brook, on the open fields of Haslingfield, Harlton and Little Eversden.

The name 'Wimpole' is suggested to mean "pool of a man named Wina". The pool in question is that found in Wimpole Park.

The modern parish is 2468 acres in extent.

== Parish church ==
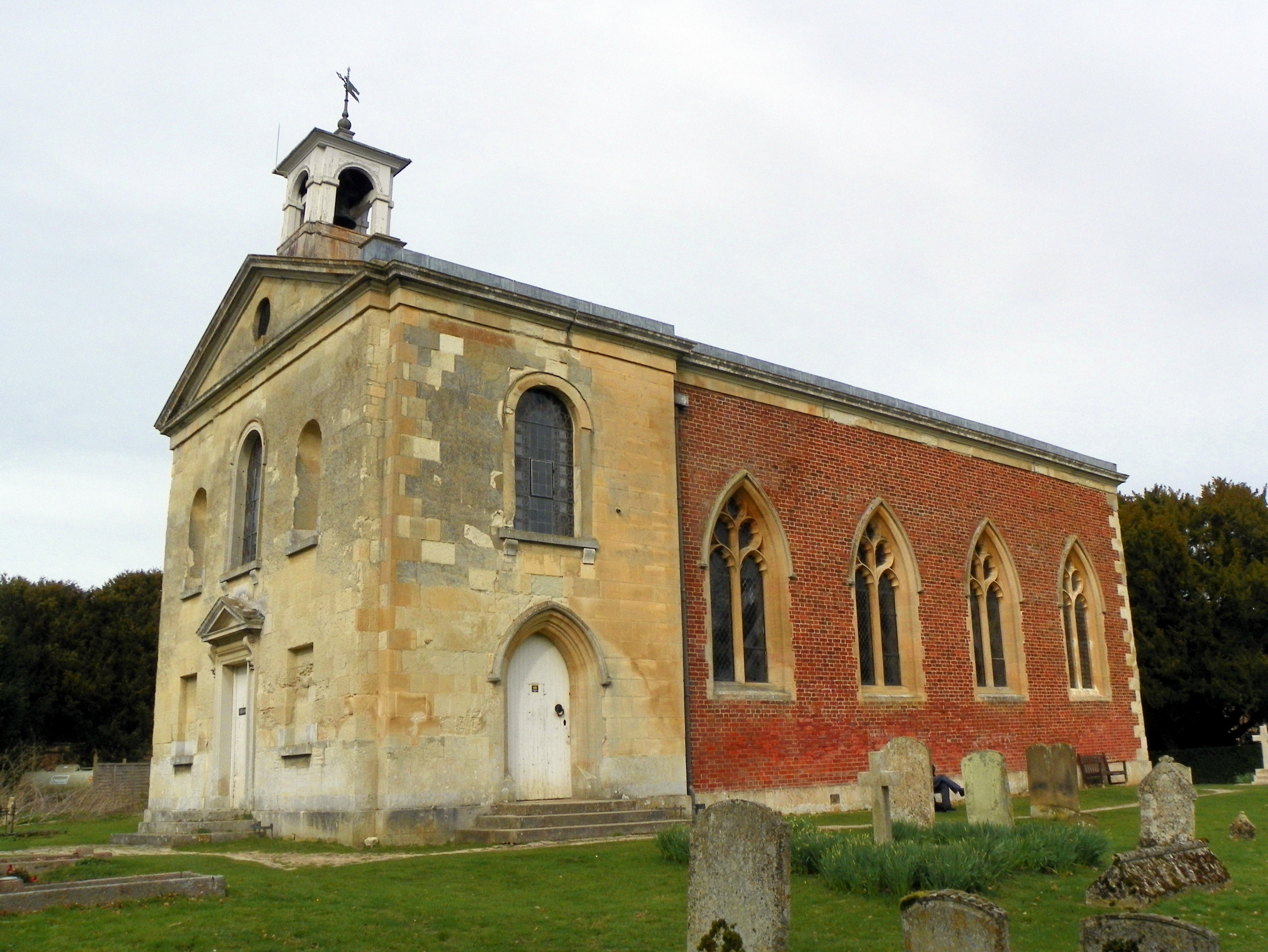
St Andrew's Church, Wimpole

The parish church of St Andrew is in use within the Orwell Group of Parishes, holding services on the first and third Sundays of each month. The building is Grade II* listed. It is next-door to the Hall and was once part of the Hall's estate (whose east service wing nearly abutted it at one point). It contains the family tombs of some of its residents, such as the Earls of Hardwicke, and a stained-glass window commemorating Thomas Agar-Robartes, eldest son of Thomas Charles, 6th Viscount Clifton and Mary, Viscountess Clifton of Lanhydrock, Bodmin, Cornwall. A medieval church on the site was demolished (except for most of the Chicheley Chantry or Chapel dating to 1390, which survived despite thus being open to the north side of the body of the nave during the 1749 construction work) in 1749 to build the present nave and chancel.

The chantry's name dates to when the estate was owned by Henry Chichele and his relations' descendants. However, it was actually founded by the previous owner of the estate, Sir William de Staundon (MP, Master of the Grocer's Company, and Lord Mayor of London in 1392 and 1407) in c.1390. He and his first wife Elizabeth are buried at Wimpole. Both the church and chantry were remodelled in Neo Gothic style in the mid 19th century, and then restored again straight after the Second World War, in 1993/4 and in 1997.

== Notable people ==
- John Conder (1714 – 1781), Independent minister

== See also ==
- Wimpole Estate
