= Natu Gopal Narhar =

Marathi poet

Natu Gopal Narhar (1911–1991) was a Marathi poet, often referred to as Poet Manmohan. One of his collections, Aditya, was published in 1971 by Continental Prakashan. He was born in Mangaon, Kolhapur district.

One of his first anthologies was Opium Pills in 1933. He also wrote Kuhukuhu, Daryali Khaskhas, Field Marshal's Salute and Manjul Bhavgite besides poems like Tai Telin, which became famous. He was popular as a folk poet and in his poems he wrote about Hindu-Muslim riots, and about poverty, hunger and suffering.
