= George Bambridge =

British soldier and diplomat (1892–1943)

- Born: George Louis St Clair Bambridge; 27 September 1892
- Died: 16 December 1943 (aged 51)
- Occupation: Diplomat
- Spouse: Elsie Kipling (m. 1924)

George Louis St Clair Bambridge MC (27 September 1892 – 16 December 1943) was a British diplomat. His wife, Elsie (née Kipling), was the daughter of the author Rudyard Kipling.

== Life ==
=== Early life and education ===
George Louis St Clair Bambridge was born in 1892 to George Frederick Bambridge and Ada Henrietta (née Baddeley). George Frederick Bambridge was the private secretary of Alfred, Duke of Saxe-Coburg and Gotha and the son of photography pioneer William Bambridge; Ada was the daughter of Major John Fraser Loddington Baddeley, an officer of the Royal Artillery and later of the Royal Gunpowder Factory, Waltham Abbey. Following the deaths of his mother (in 1896) and his father (in 1898), Bambridge was brought up in the family of Cecil Floersheim, the husband of George's mother's sister. He was educated at Eton.

=== Career ===
At the start of the Great War, Bambridge applied for and received a commission, initially as a 2nd Lieutenant in the Middlesex Regiment, then later as a Captain in the Irish Guards he served from 1914 to 1918 and was awarded the Military Cross. Citation reads: "when the enemy, attacking in great strength, succeeded in driving a wedge into our line, this officer immediately led a counter-attack which was entirly [sic] successful, the enemy being driven back with loss and the line re-established. It was entirly due to his initiative and dash that the line was maintained.".

After the war, he served with His Majesty's Diplomatic Service as an honorary attache in the embassies in Madrid August 1922 - resigned July 1924, Brussels October 1924, Madrid, December 1925 - resigned 1928 and Paris June 1929 - resigned 1932.

=== Marriage ===
George Bambridge married Elsie Kipling, daughter of Rudyard Kipling, on 22 October 1924. The marriage was at the church of St Margaret's, Westminster; the reception was at the home of Stanley Baldwin, a Kipling family cousin and three times Prime Minister of the United Kingdom. The couple, who had no children, moved into Burgh House, Hampstead in 1933 where Rudyard Kipling was a regular visitor. Kipling’s last outing was a visit to Burgh House in January 1936 to comfort his son-in-law, who was in bed with bronchitis. The following day, the writer was rushed to hospital, where he died a few days later. In 1937, the Bambridges left Burgh House having purchased Wimpole Hall, near Cambridge.

=== Death and afterward ===
Bambridge died on 16 December 1943, aged 51, from undisclosed causes, at Wimpole Hall. His widow died in 1976. They are interred in St Andrew's Churchyard, next to Wimpole Hall.
