= Wimpole Estate =

Country estate near Cambridge, England

Wimpole Hall
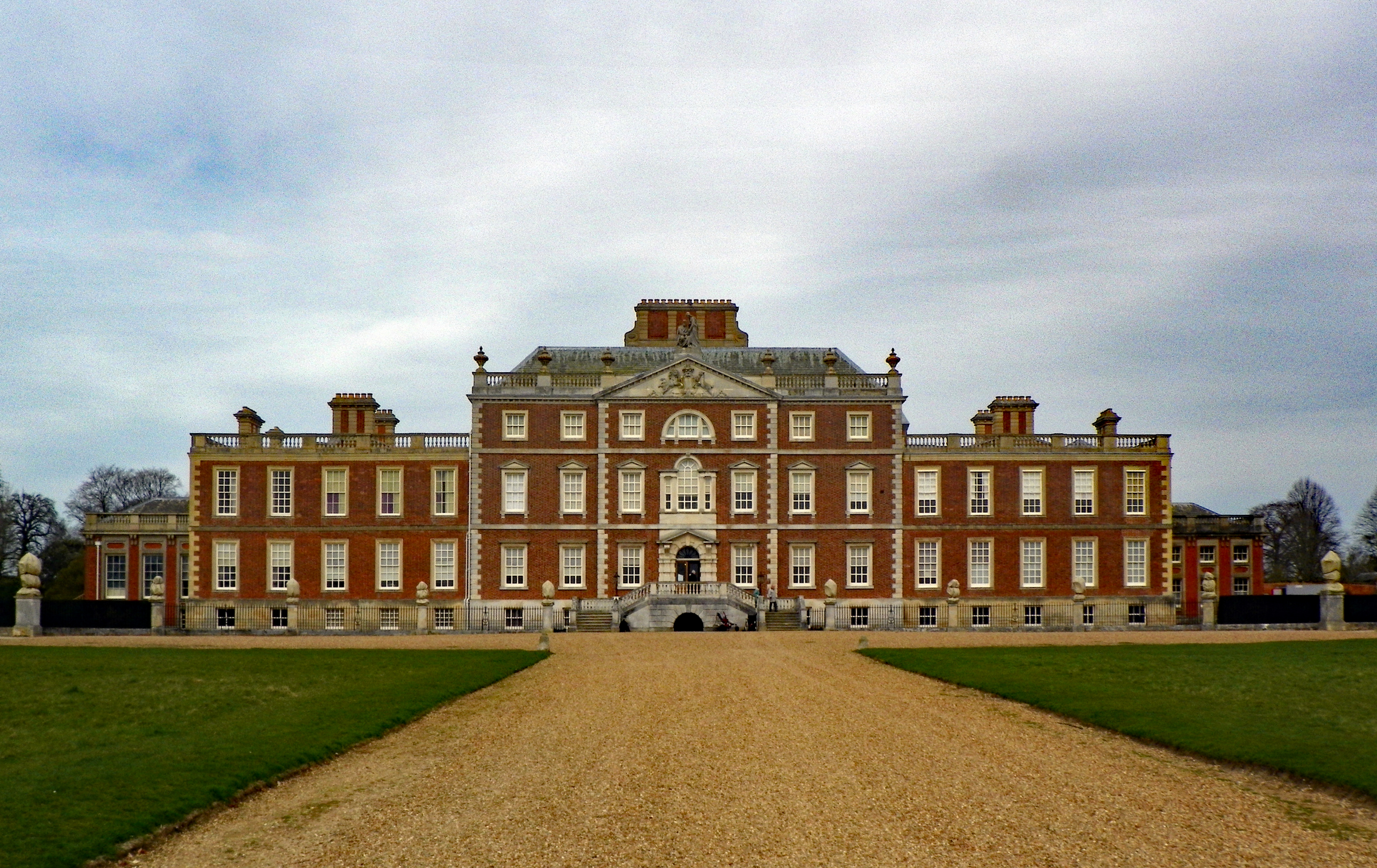
- The entrance front

- Location within Cambridgeshire
- 52°08′28″N 0°02′59″W
- Type: Country house
- Location: Wimpole

History
- Built: 1640–1650 extended 1713-1716 remodelled 1742-1745 remodelled 1790-1794 remodelled c.1842

Site notes
- Area: Cambridgeshire
- Architect(s): James Gibbs; Henry Flitcroft; John Soane; Henry Edward Kendall
- Owner: National Trust

Listed Building – Grade I
- Official name: Wimpole Hall
- Designated: 22 November 1967
- Reference no.: 1128166

National Register of Historic Parks and Gardens
- Official name: Wimpole Hall
- Designated: 16 January 1985
- Reference no.: 1000635

Wimpole Estate is a large estate containing Wimpole Hall, a country house located within the civil parish of Wimpole, Cambridgeshire, England, 9 miles (14 km) southwest of Cambridge. The house began in 1640 and its 3,000 acres (1,200 ha; 12 km^{2}) of parkland and farmland are owned by the National Trust. It has a working farm, Home Farm, which houses rare breed animals. The estate is open to the public and received more than 409,000 visitors in 2025.

== History ==
Sited close to the great Roman road, Ermine Street, Wimpole was listed in the Domesday Book of 1086. At that time there was a moated manor house set in a small 81-hectare (200-acre) deer park. Situated to the north and south of this were three medieval villages: Bennall End, Thresham End and Green End.

The estate was held by the Chicheley family for more than 250 years, beginning in 1428 with Henry Chichele who was Archbishop of Canterbury. The last of this family to hold the house was the politician Thomas Chicheley, who was responsible for the "new" house that was completed in 1650. Chicheley established the "formal gardens and architectural landscape". He enjoyed the house for 36 years until, weighed down by financial problems, he was forced to sell to Sir John Cutler. In 1689, Sir John gave it as a marriage settlement to his daughter Elizabeth and her husband Charles Robartes, 2nd Earl of Radnor. Lord Radnor extended the formal gardens and dug out fishponds. On the death of Elizabeth in 1697, without an heir, the estate passed to Edmund Boulter, nephew of Sir John Cutler. In 1710 it was in the possession of John Holles, 1st Duke of Newcastle-upon-Tyne, who left it to his daughter Lady Henrietta Cavendish Holles upon his death the following year. Upon Henrietta's marriage, in 1713, it became the possession of her husband Edward Harley, 2nd Earl of Oxford and Earl Mortimer.

In 1740, Edward sold Wimpole to Philip Yorke, 1st Earl of Hardwicke, in order to pay off his debts, and he subsequently commissioned Henry Flitcroft to remodel the front of the house. Philip Yorke, 2nd Earl of Hardwicke, who inherited the house in 1764, and his wife Jemima Yorke, 2nd Marchioness de Grey employed Capability Brown to improve the grounds of the estate, after he had worked for the couple at Wrest Park. Philip Yorke, 3rd Earl of Hardwicke, employed Sir John Soane to build and make a number of alterations to Wimpole, between 1790 and 1795, including the plunge bath in Wimpole Hall, a hothouse, water reservoir, cottages, home farm and the hen house. On 27 October 1843, Queen Victoria and Prince Albert visited the hall. They listened to speeches by local politicians, including owner Charles Yorke, 4th Earl of Hardwicke, and dinner was served for 26 people. A ball was held in the evening. On 28 October 1843, Her Majesty visited the farm in the morning before departing for London. Charles Yorke, 5th Earl of Hardwicke was the last member of the Yorke family to own Wimpole and inherited the estate in 1873. He amassed debts with the Agar-Robartes Bank, with the estate being taken over in settlement of the debts in the 1890's by Thomas Agar-Robartes, 6th Viscount Clifden, and then his son, Francis Agar-Robartes, 7th Viscount Clifden who in 1930, departed to Lanhydrock upon the death of his father.

In 1938, Capt. George Bambridge and his wife, Elsie, daughter of Rudyard Kipling, purchased Wimpole, having rented it since 1936. They used the inheritance left to them by her father, and the royalties from his books, for the long-needed refurbishment of the house and grounds. During World War II, the house had no running water nor electricity, and in 1943 land on the estate was requisitioned by the British Army, so a hospital could be established for casualties. George Bambridge died of influenza at Wimpole Hall in 1943. The hospital was used by the United States Army Medical Department between 1944 and 1946, with the requisitioned land finally being used as a United States Air Force Hospital, before it was returned to Elsie Bambridge in 1960. During her time at Wimpole Hall, Elsie was known to become irritated by members of the public gathering too close to the house for picnics, so much so, she once returned to an offending couple's property and had her own picnic on their lawn. Elsie Bambridge bequeathed the estate to the National Trust when she died in 1976, and the estate, including the hall, was first opened to the public in 1979.

== The hall ==
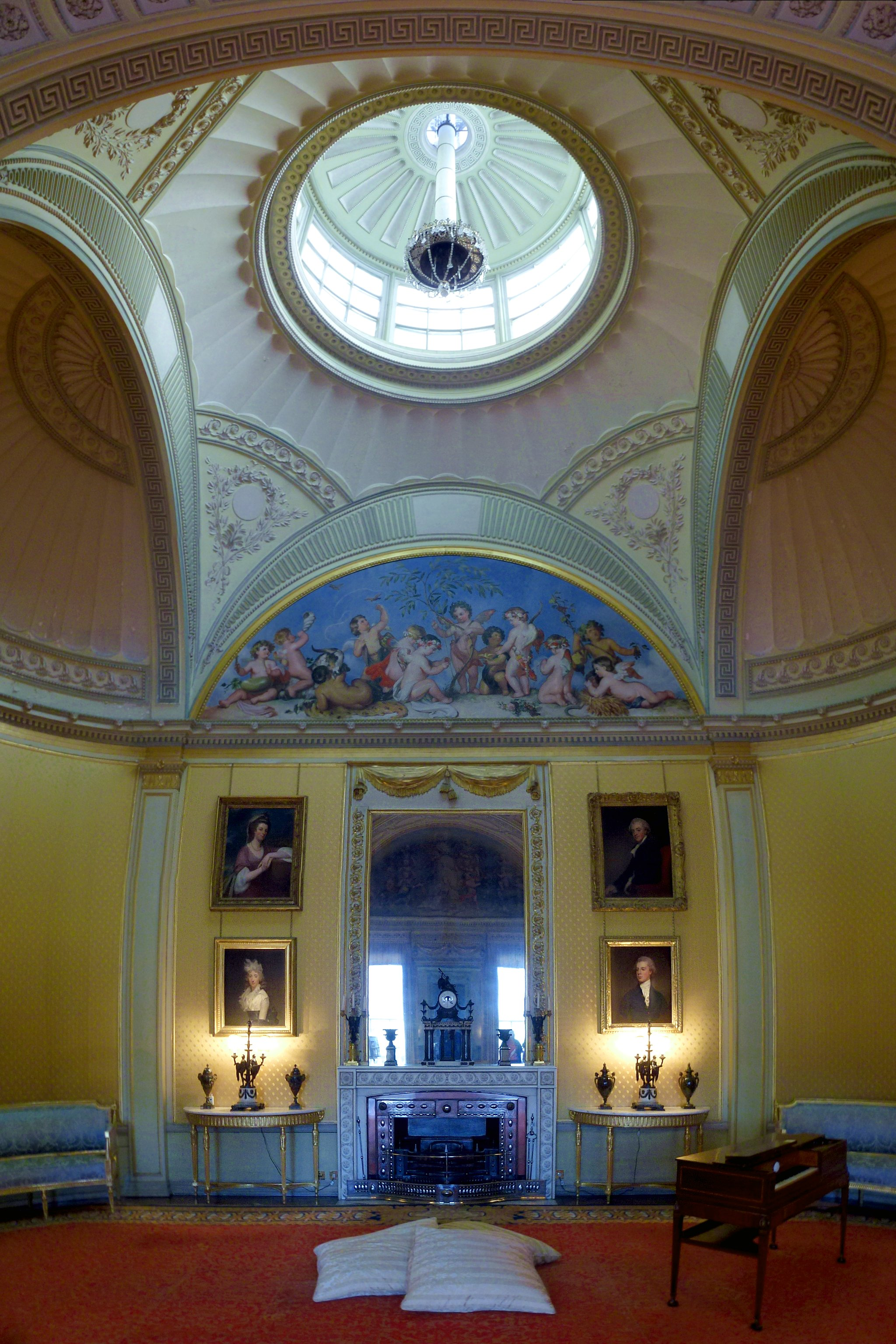
The Yellow Drawing Room 1793 by Sir John Soane

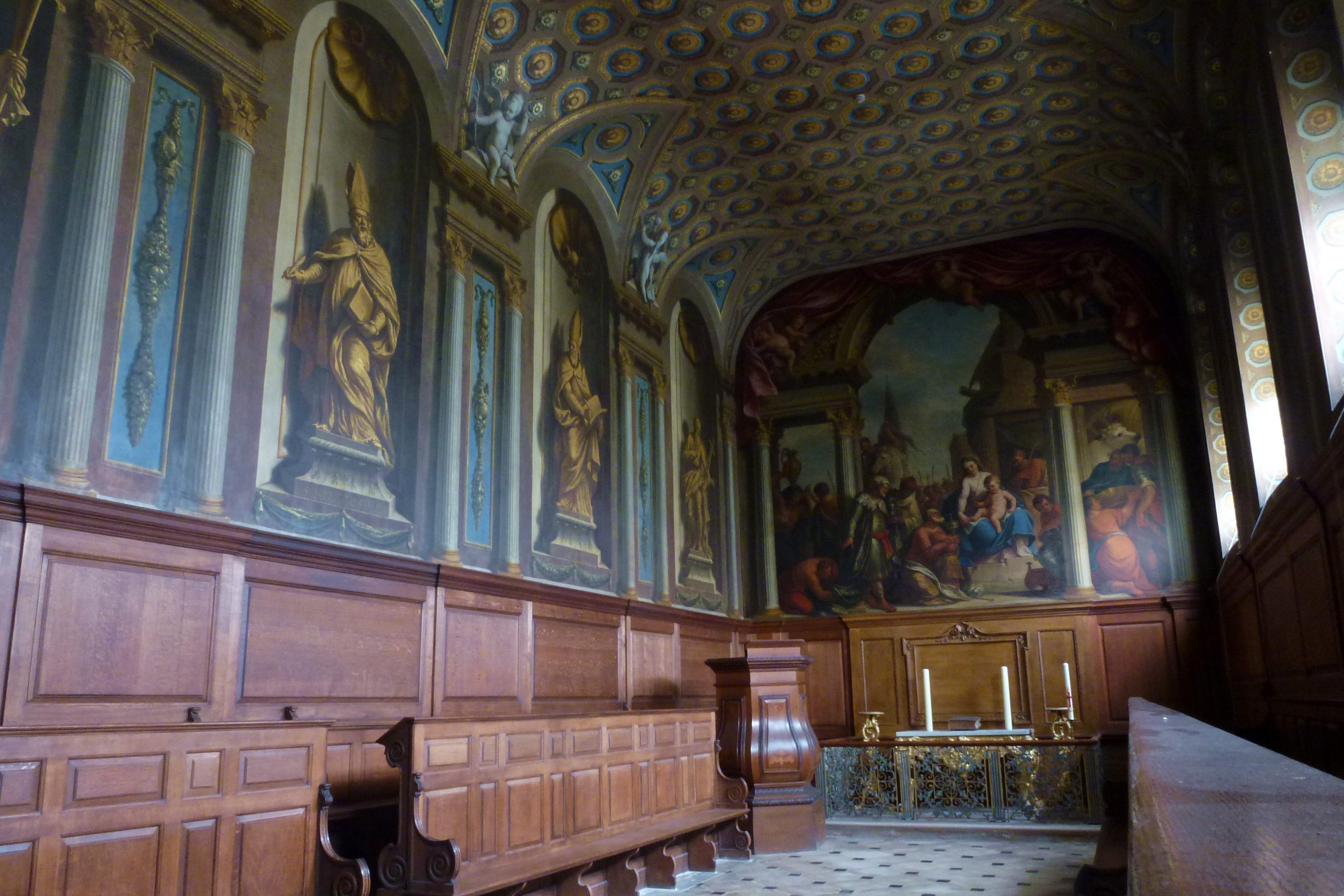
The chapel by James Gibbs with murals by Sir James Thornhill completed 1724

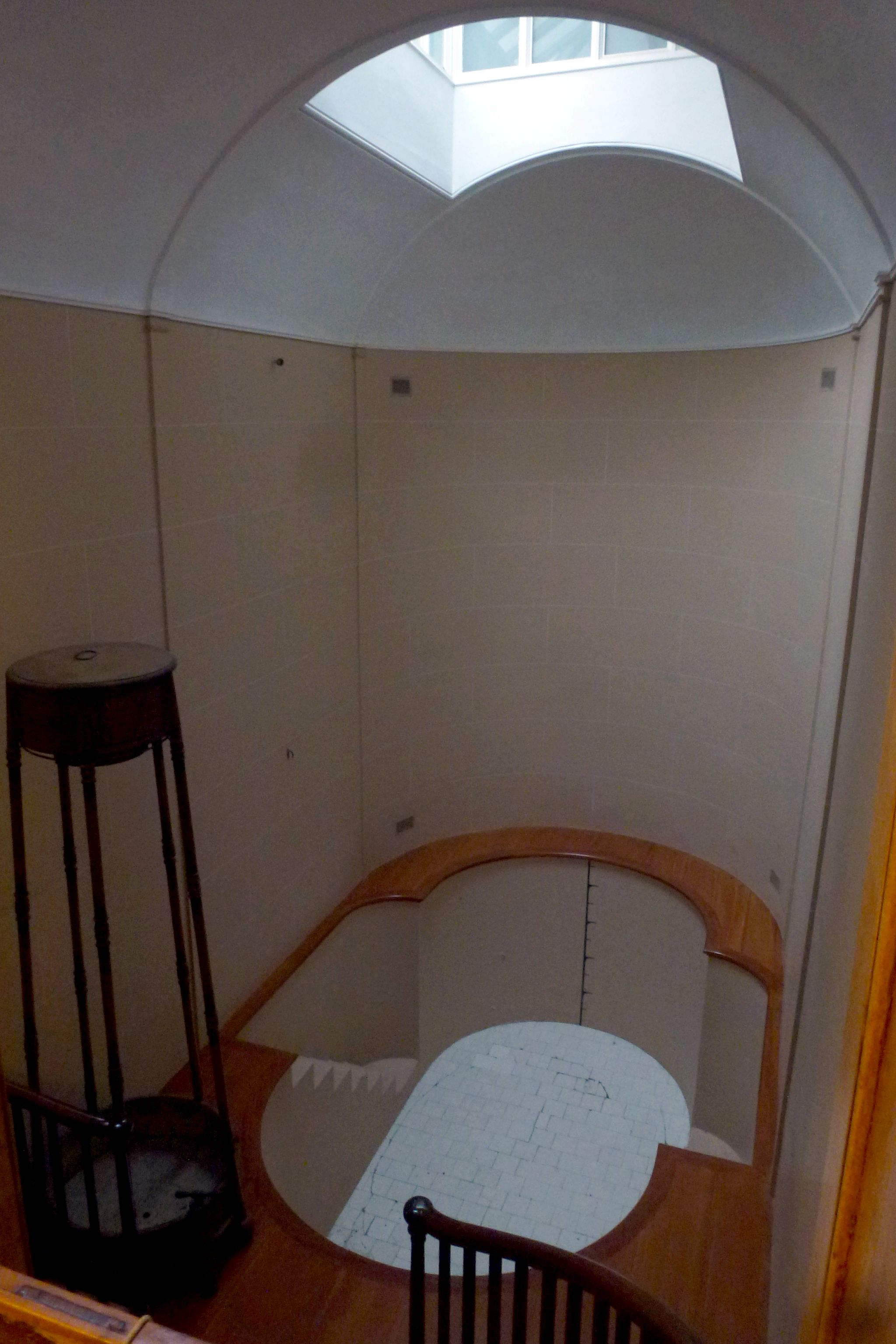
The Plunge Bath c.1792 by Sir John Soane

Notable architects who worked at the hall included James Gibbs (between 1713 and 1730), Henry Flitcroft (around 1749), John Soane (1790s), and H. E. Kendall (1840s). There are decorative schemes by the painter James Thornhill (1721). Carved marble busts of the Roman emperors Trajan and Galba were returned to Wimpole in 2014 and placed on the original wooden plinths which had been carved for them by Rattee and Kett in around 1860. In 2025 it became possible for visitors to enter the library, which was restricted previously due to it containing a fragile 18th century carpet. Axminster Carpets, The National Trust and Oxford University are carrying out research to establish the story of the design, purchase and fitting of the carpet.

== The estate ==
Wimpole Hall's grounds, enclosed in 1302, were laid out and modified by landscape designers such as George London and Henry Wise (1693–1705), Charles Bridgeman (1720s), Robert Greening (1740s), "Capability" Brown (1767), and Humphry Repton (1801–1809). Bridgeman's formal grand avenue sweeps away from the south front of the house for two and a half miles, in contrast with the remainder of the park which was "naturalised" by Capability Brown. The elms were killed by Dutch elm disease, but the avenue has been replanted.

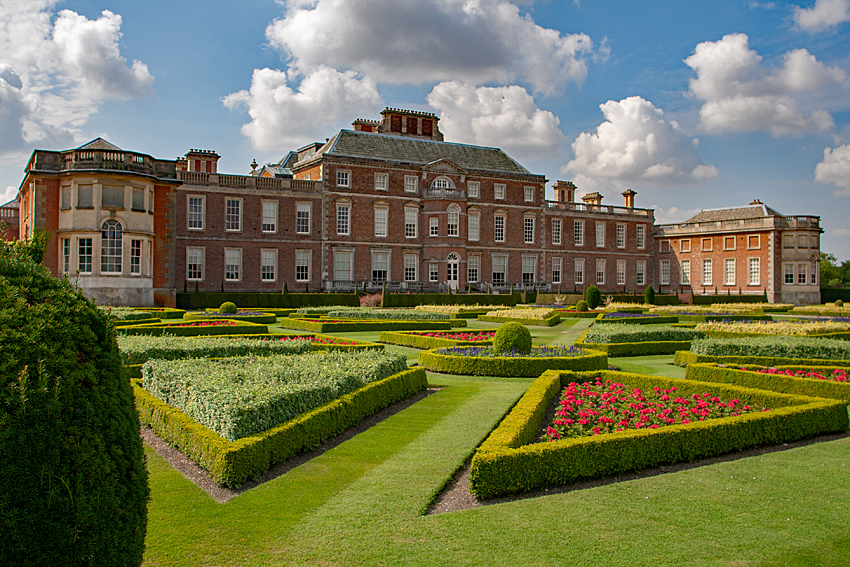
The "Dutch garden" at Wimpole

The North Park has belts of woodland, its central features being the neo-Gothic Tower, Wimpole's Folly (1768), the restored lakes in the valley below (1695–1767), St Andrew's church (1749), home farm (1794), a walled garden (18th century), and a stable block (1851). The "Dutch Garden" beneath the hall was established in 1980 with the rest of the garden completed based upon the mid-19th century parterre.

A tree planting project was reported in 2022, with the intention of becoming net carbon zero, with 90,000 trees planted. 14 species of native trees were planted including oak, hornbeam, wild cherry, field maple and birch, as well as 10 species of shrubs including hawthorn, hazel and spindle. The walled garden at Wimpole, which follows organic principles, grows crops, a portion of which is donated to a local foodbank. In 2023 a daffodil survey found 77 varieties. Daffodils were the favourite flower of Wimpole's last private owner, Elsie Bambridge.

Five Dartmoor ponies arrived on the estate in early 2026, to help restore the landscape by grazing on plants and thistles to encourage wildflowers and grasses, as part of the estates grazing conservation strategy. Staff and volunteers are restoring or planting 23 km (14 miles) of hedges on the estate, creating a habitat for bird species such as corn bunting, yellowhammer and linnet, and for species like fieldfare and redwing, that visit in the winter months.

=== Home Farm ===
Home Farm is an 18th-century model farm on the Wimpole Estate. It is a Rare Breeds Survival Trust approved farm. The farm has rare breed animals that have included Irish Moiled and Shetland cattle, Oxford Sandy and Black pigs and Bagot goats. Rare horse breeds kept on the farm and within the estate include Shire Horses, and a Suffolk Punch. It was originally built in 1794 as a model farm by Sir John Soane for Philip Yorke, 3rd Earl of Hardwicke, and the farm today displays a collection of farm implements.

=== Activities ===
A range of organised events and less formal activities make use of the wider estate. In 2013, a partnership between the trust and Parkrun led to the establishment of a free, weekly timed 3.1-mile (5.0 km) run. An illuminated trail, Christmas at Wimpole, is held annually.

== Listed buildings ==
The Wimpole Park Estate contains a number of listed buildings and structures. Wimpole Hall, a neo-classical building, is Grade I listed, and the estate itself is Grade I listed on the Register of Historic Parks and Gardens. The entrance gates and piers at the west entrance to the hall are listed Grade II, and the stable block is listed Grade II*.

In the gardens, a group of five vases and a copy of the sculpture Samson Slaying a Philistine are listed Grade II, as are the steps to the west of the hall and the wall and railings to the south. On the edge of the ornamental gardens the ha-ha to the north west and to the north are both listed Grade II.

The farm contains several listed buildings and structures. The Great Barn is listed Grade II*. The farmhouse, cart shed, and the loose boxes north west of the barn are all listed Grade II. The "K6" model red telephone box on the farm is also Grade II listed.

The Wimpole's Folly castle on the estate is listed Grade II*. The walled garden and the gardener's cottage on the north side of the walled garden are both listed Grade II, as is the game larder to the north east of the hall.

== Gallery ==
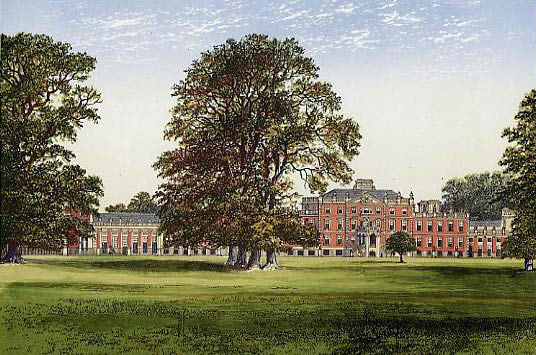
Wimpole Hall in 1880

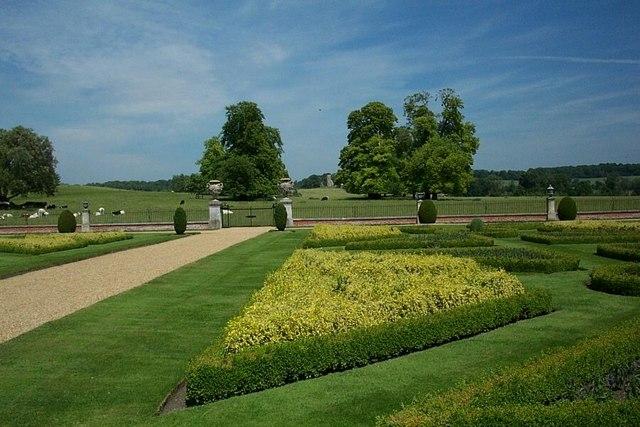
Parterre on the north front

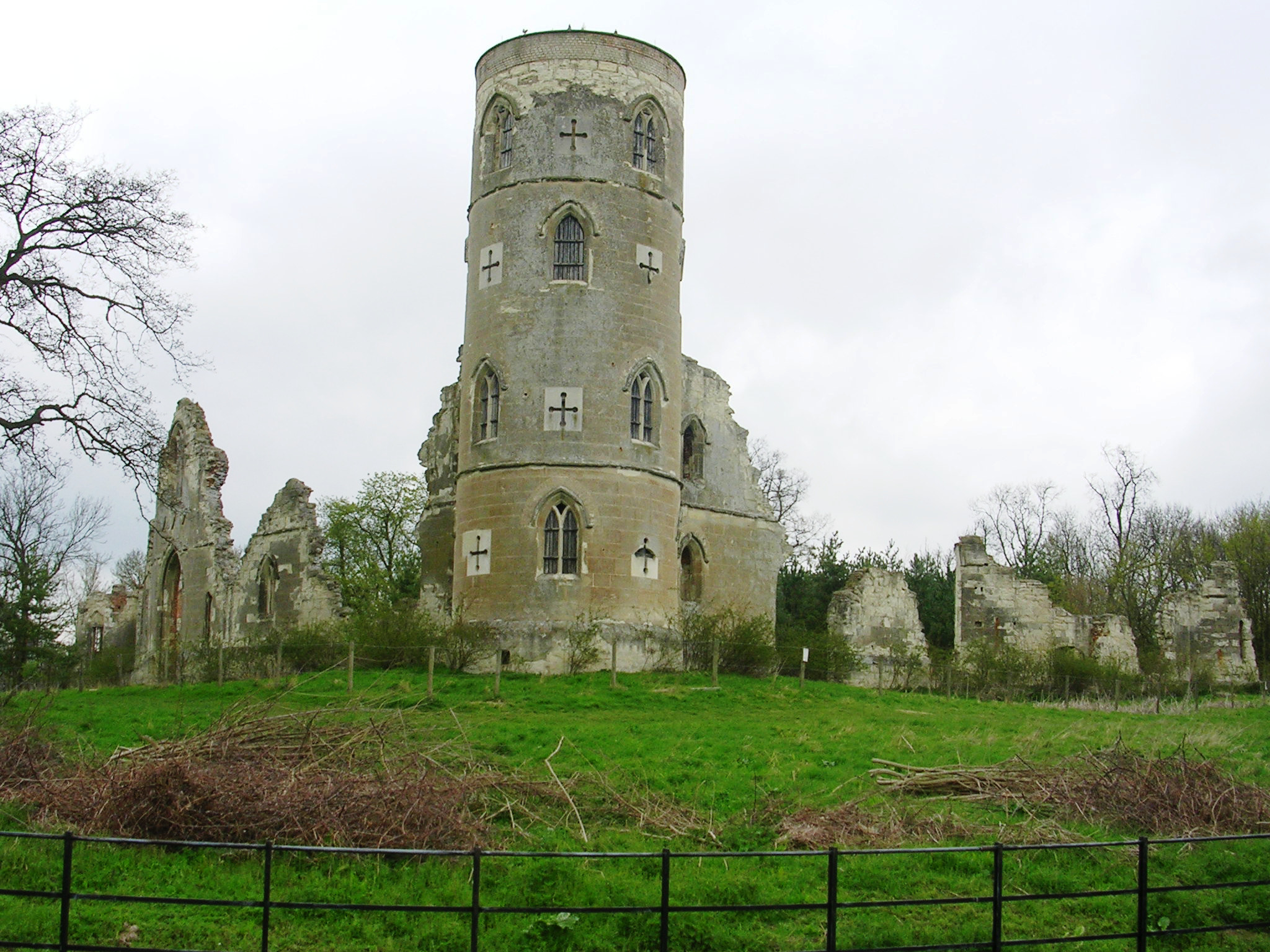
Wimpole's Folly, designed in 1751 by Sanderson Miller, it evokes a medieval castle ruin

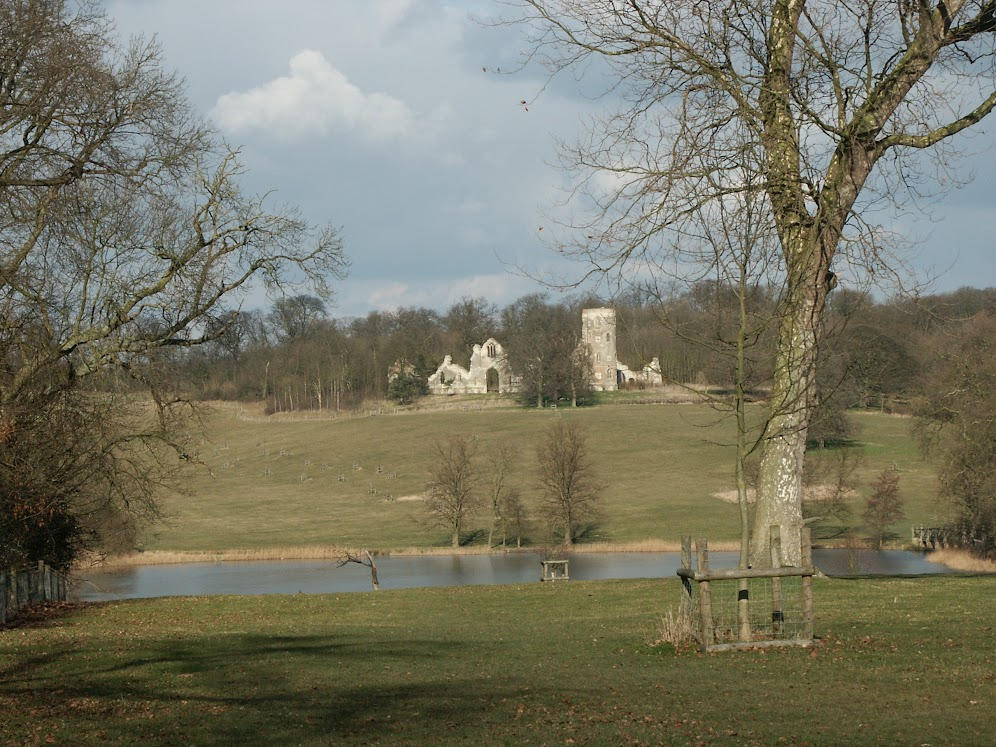
The lake and Gothic folly in the grounds of Wimpole Hall

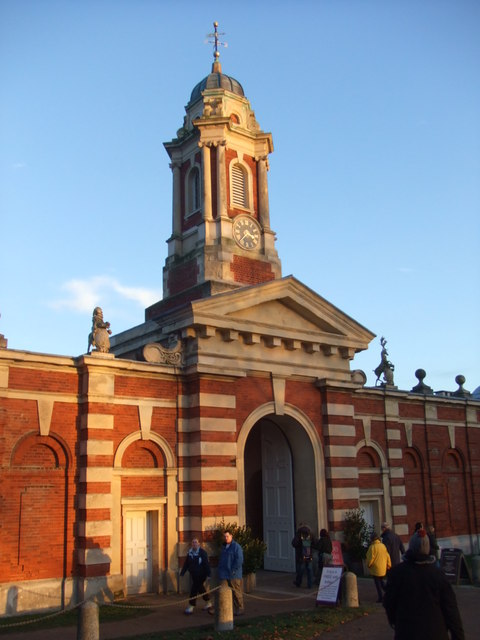
Wimpole the stable block designed by Henry Edward Kendall and erected in 1851

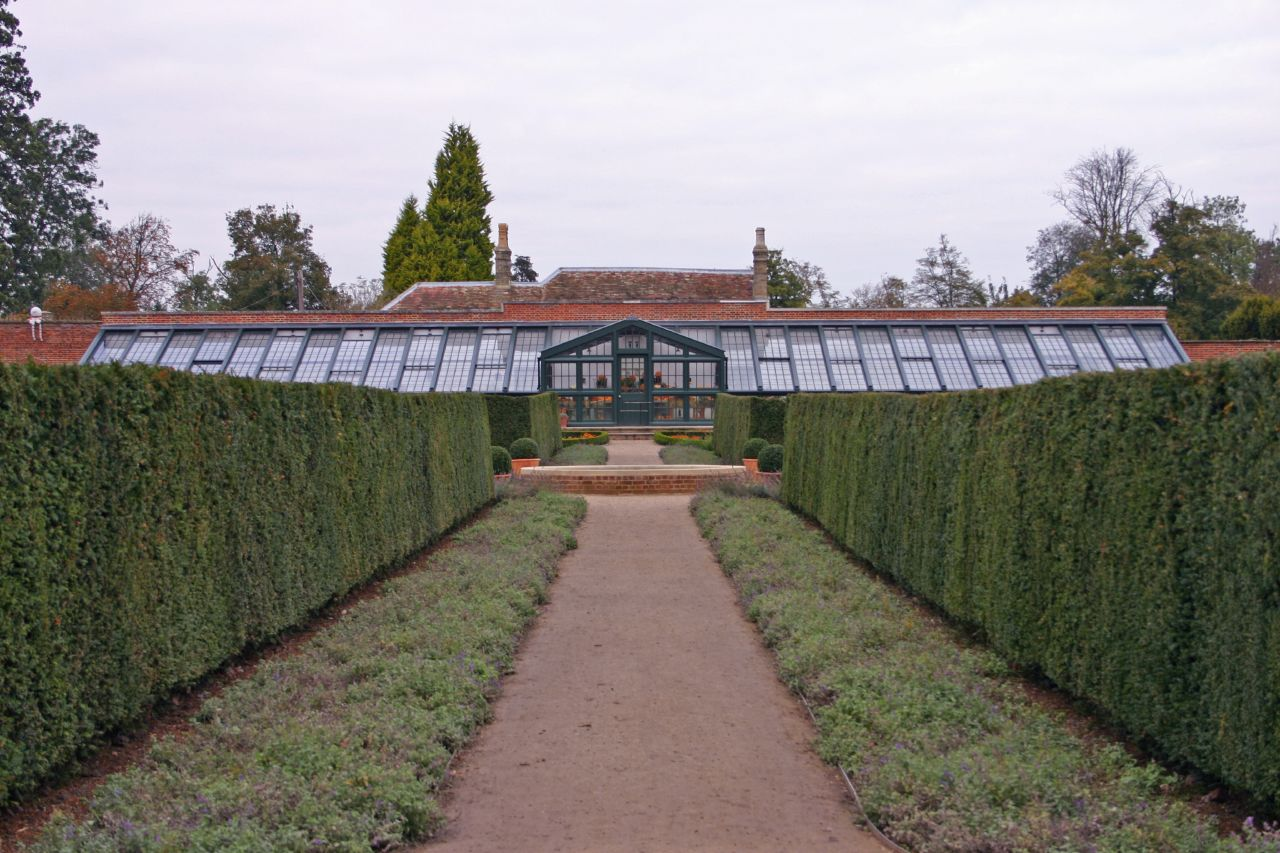
Wimpole glasshouses in the kitchen garden

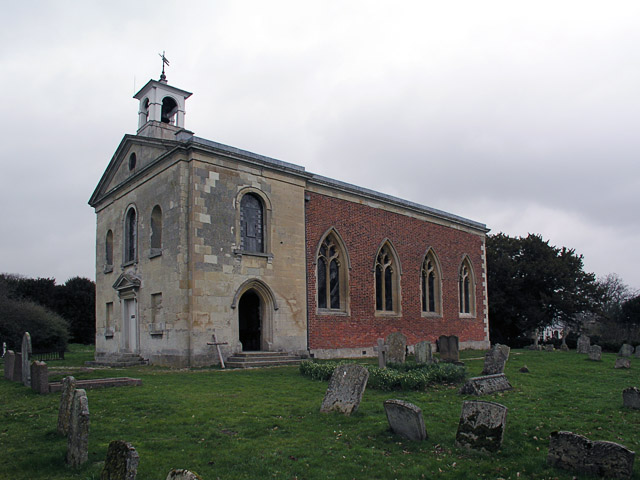
St Andrew's Church

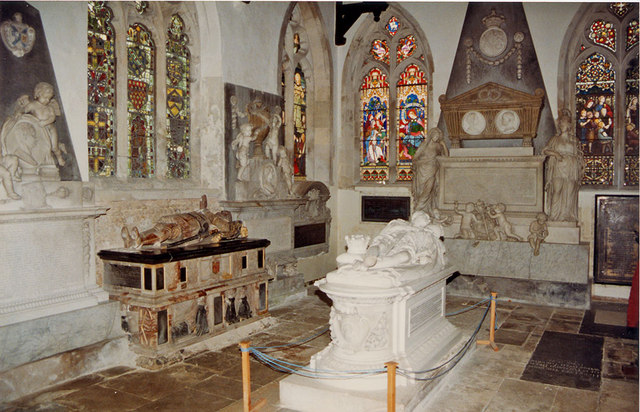
Memorials and tombs in St Andrew's Church, Wimpole

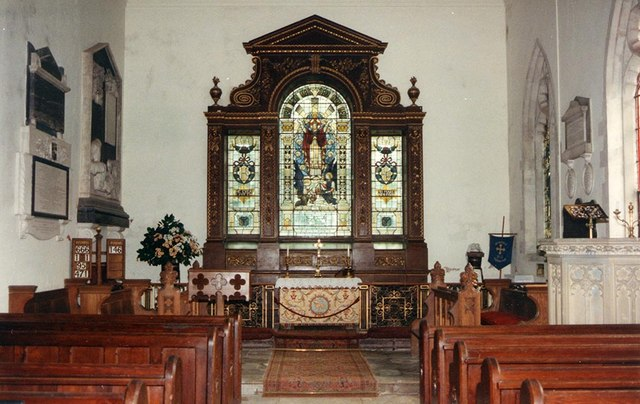
Chancel St Andrew's Church, Wimpole

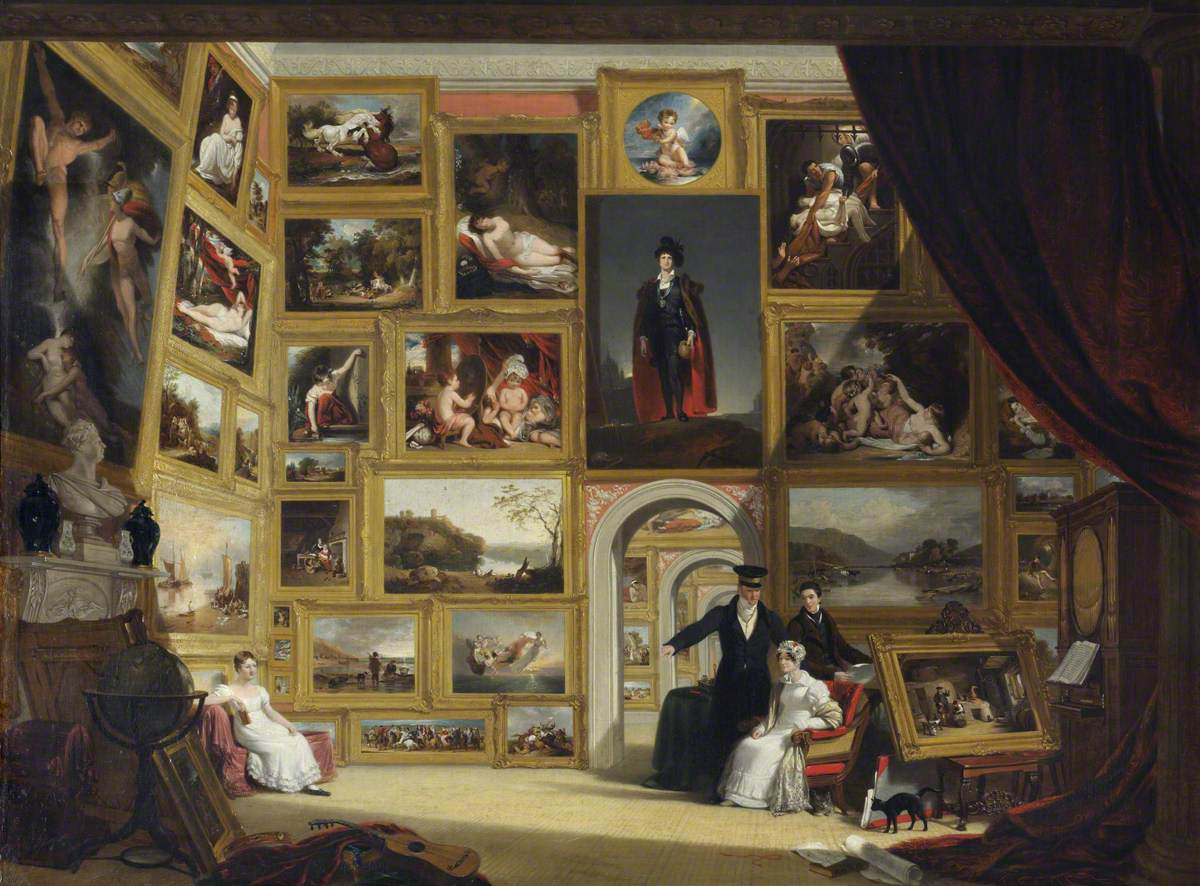
A Modern Picture Gallery by William Frederick Witherington, 1824. Part of the collection of art at Wimpole Hall

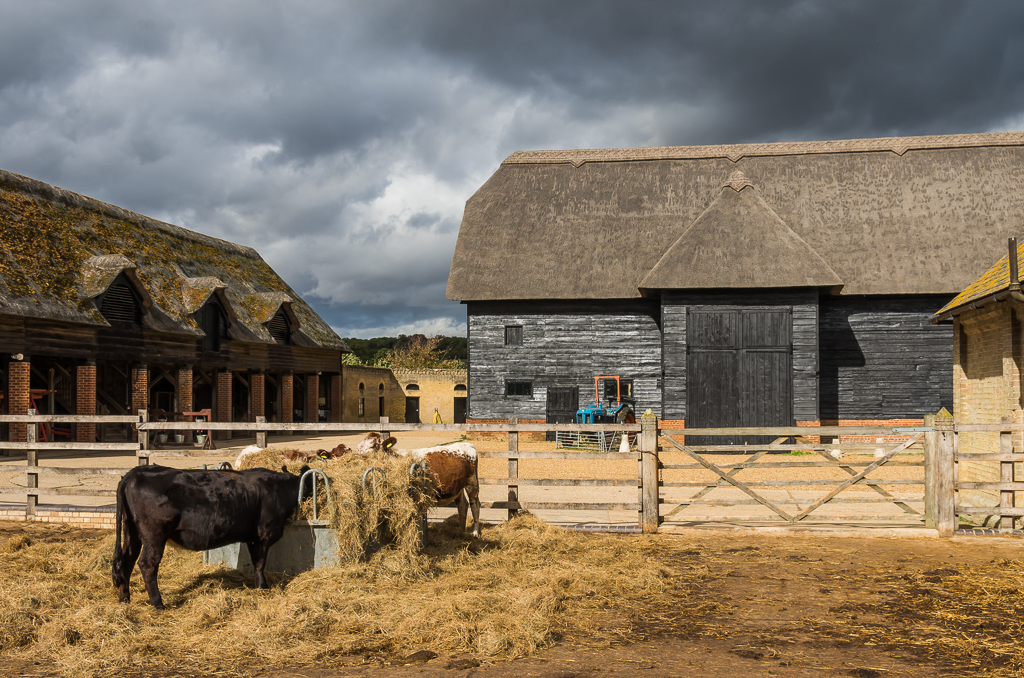
Wimpole Home Farm
