= Elsie Bambridge =

Daughter of Rudyard Kipling

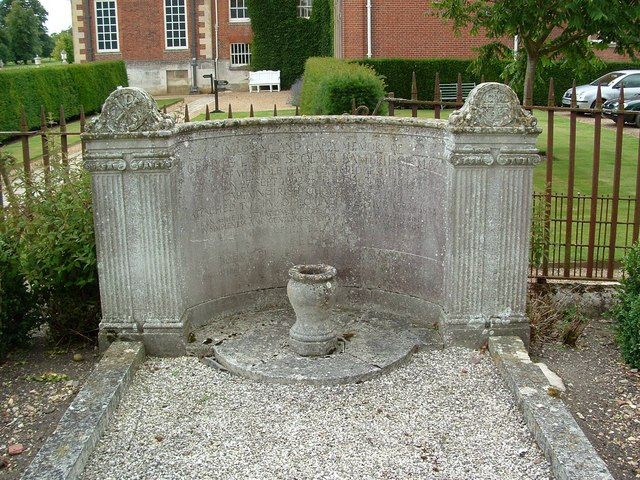
- Born: Elsie Kipling; 2 February 1896; Dummerston, Vermont, U.S.
- Died: 24 April 1976 (aged 80); Wimpole, Cambridgeshire, England
- Spouse: George Bambridge (m. 1924; died 1943)
- Parents: Rudyard Kipling (father); Caroline Starr Balestier (mother)

Elsie Bambridge (née Kipling; 2 February 1896 – 24 May 1976) was the second daughter of British writer Rudyard Kipling. She was the only one of the Kiplings' three children to survive beyond early adulthood.

On 22 October 1924, Elsie Kipling married George Bambridge and in 1938 they bought Wimpole Hall, Cambridgeshire's largest stately home. When her father died in 1936, she became the executor of his estate, which included all his papers and the copyright on all his works.

Her obituary in The Times stated she had two missions in life, "to maintain the traditions of her husband Captain George Bambridge and her father Rudyard Kipling". She was in the news in the U.K. and America in 1958 when she protected her father’s integrity as his executor by prohibiting a recording by Frank Sinatra of the song “On the Road to Mandalay”, based on her father’s poem “Mandalay”, from being issued in the United Kingdom. She disapproved of the many liberties Sinatra took with the text. In the U. K. when Kipling died in 1936 all his works remained copyrighted for 70 years from the year of his death. On her death in 1976, having no children, she bequeathed her property and its contents to the National Trust. The Trust later donated her father's manuscripts to the University of Sussex in Brighton, to ensure better public access to them. She is buried in the graveyard of St Andrew's Church on the Wimpole estate.

== See also ==
- Frederick Smith, 2nd Earl of Birkenhead, author of a biography about Bambridge's father, which she did not allow to be published
