= David Haig =

English actor and playwright (born 1955)

David Haig MBE
- Born: David Haig Collum Ward; 20 September 1955 (age 70); Aldershot, Hampshire, England
- Education: London Academy of Music and Dramatic Art
- Occupations: Actor, playwright
- Years active: 1978–present
- Spouse: Jane Galloway (m. 2010)
- Children: 5, including Alice Haig

David Haig Collum Ward (born 20 September 1955) is an English actor and playwright. He has appeared in West End productions and numerous television and film roles over a career spanning six decades.

Haig wrote the play My Boy Jack, which premièred at the Hampstead Theatre on 13 October 1997. On Remembrance Day 2007, ITV broadcast a television drama based on the play, in which Haig played Rudyard Kipling and Daniel Radcliffe played Kipling's son, John. He went on to star as the Player in Rosencrantz and Guildenstern Are Dead alongside Radcliffe in 2017.

Haig's second play The Good Samaritan was also first staged at the Hampstead Theatre, opening on 6 July 2000. His third play Pressure premiered at Chichester Festival Theatre in 2014, before being revived in 2018 on a UK Tour and then in the West End at the Ambassadors Theatre. In 2018, he portrayed Bill in the critically acclaimed BBC America thriller series Killing Eve (2018). His fourth play Magic premiered at Chichester Festival Theatre in 2026.

Haig was appointed Member of the Order of the British Empire (MBE) in the 2013 Birthday Honours for services to drama.

== Early life ==
Haig was born on 20 September 1955 in Aldershot, Hampshire, the son of opera singer Shirley R. C. (née Brooks) and army officer (and later director of the Hayward Gallery) Francis W. He had a younger sister who died aged 22 of a brain aneurysm. He grew up in Rugby, Warwickshire where he attended Rugby School.

== Career ==
=== Film and television ===
Haig appeared in the 1994 film Four Weddings and a Funeral and had a main role in the BBC television sitcom The Thin Blue Line (1995), playing Inspector Grim, the inept foil to Rowan Atkinson's Inspector Fowler. He also appeared in Love on a Branch Line, a TV series broadcast by the BBC in four episodes. In 2002 he played the brother of Four Weddings' co-star Hugh Grant in the romantic comedy Two Weeks Notice. In 2007, he appeared in a Comic Relief sketch called "Mr. Bean's Wedding" as the bride's father, reuniting with Atkinson.

Other TV work includes the Doctor Who serial The Leisure Hive (1980); the Blake's 7 episode "Rumours of Death" (1980); Diamonds (1981 TV series); Campion story "Sweet Danger" (1990); Inspector Morse episode "Dead on Time" (1992); and Cracker story "To Say I Love You" (1993). In the 1990s, he appeared in series 1 of the TV series Soldier Soldier.

He appears in the Richard Fell adaptation of the 1960s science fiction series A for Andromeda, on the UK digital television station BBC Four.

Haig wrote the play My Boy Jack, and later appeared as Rudyard Kipling, alongside Daniel Radcliffe, in television adaptation.

In 2008, he appeared in the BBC film Dustbin Baby, and The 39 Steps. He also appeared in the Midsomer Murders, episode "The Glitch". In 2009 he appeared as Steve Fleming in BBC TV's The Thick of It, and as Jon, husband to former MP Mo Mowlam in the drama Mo, opposite Julie Walters. Also in 2009, he appeared in two episodes as the headmaster of Portwenn Primary School, Mr Straine on ITV comedy drama Doc Martin.

In January 2013, Haig started appearing as Jim Hacker in a re-make of classic 1980s comedy series Yes, Prime Minister, broadcast on Gold TV in the United Kingdom.

In 2012 a new sitcom pilot, starring Haig and written by Ben Elton, was filmed for the BBC. Filming for a full six-part series of the sitcom, The Wright Way (formerly known as Slings and Arrows) was completed in March 2013, and began airing on BBC One on 23 April.

An August 2018 announcement indicated that Haig would be among the new cast to join the original actors in the Downton Abbey film which started principal photography at about the same time. In September 2018 he appeared as Bill alongside Jodie Comer in the BBC America thriller series Killing Eve.

In September 2024, production started on his film adaptation of his play Pressure.

=== Radio ===
In 2008, he played Maurice Haigh-Wood in the BBC Radio adaptation of Michael Hastings' play Tom and Viv, and 2010 he starred as Norman Birkett in "Norman Birkett and the Case of the Coleford Poisoner" on BBC Radio 4's Afternoon Play series. He also played the narrator and the older Lewis Eliot in C. P. Snow's Strangers and Brothers on Radio 4 in 2003, repeated on Radio 4 Extra every few years.

=== Stage ===
He also won an Olivier Award in 1988 for Actor of the Year in a New Play, for his performance in Our Country's Good at the Royal Court in Sloane Square. He toured Britain with the stage version of My Boy Jack, which he wrote, and in which he played Rudyard Kipling and directed a production of Private Lives by Noël Coward, which made a national tour in 2005.

Haig has appeared in several stage productions in London's West End, including Hitchcock Blonde at the Royal Court, Life X 3 at the Savoy Theatre, as the character Osborne in R.C. Sherriff's play Journey's End at the Comedy Theatre, and as Mr George Banks in Mary Poppins at the Prince Edward Theatre for which he received an Olivier Award nomination. He was also nominated for playing Christopher Headingley in a revival of Michael Frayn's comedy Donkeys' Years at the Comedy Theatre. Having appeared in the role of Pinchwife in the comedy The Country Wife at the Royal Haymarket Theatre in London, he appeared in The Sea at the same theatre. Haig's next role was Truscott in the Joe Orton black farce Loot at London's Tricycle Theatre from 11 December 2008 to 31 January 2009 and at the Theatre Royal, Newcastle, 2 to 7 February 2009.

In 2010 he played the role of Jim Hacker in the stage version of Yes, Prime Minister, at the Chichester Festival then transferring to the Gielgud Theatre, in London's West End from 17 September 2010.

In September 2023, it was announced that Haig was adapting Philip K. Dick's novella "The Minority Report" for the stage, to premiere at the Lyric Hammersmith the following spring.

== Filmography and stage credits ==
=== Theatre ===
Year	Title	Role	Production	Notes
1985	Tom & Viv by Michael Hastings	Maurice Haigh-Wood	Royal Court and Broadway	
1988	Greenland by Howard Brenton	Paul	Royal Court	
1988	The Recruiting Officer by George Farquhar	Plume	Royal Court	
1988	Our Country's Good by Timberlake Wertenbaker	Ralph Clark	Royal Court	Olivier Award for Best Actor in a New Play
1991	Measure for Measure by William Shakespeare	Angelo	Young Vic and RSC tour	
1994	Dead Funny by Terry Johnson	Richard	Hampstead Theatre and West End	
1997	My Boy Jack by David Haig	Rudyard Kipling	Hampstead Theatre	Also playwright
1997	'Art' by Yasmina Reza	Ivan	Wyndham's Theatre and Broadway	
2000	The Good Samaritan by David Haig	—N/a	Hampstead Theatre	Playwright
2002	Life x 3 by Yasmina Reza	Henri	Savoy Theatre	
2003	Hitchcock Blonde by Terry Johnson	Alex	Royal Court and Lyric Theatre, West End	
2004	Journey's End by R.C. Sherriff	Osborne	Comedy Theatre	
2005	Mary Poppins by Julian Fellowes	Mr Banks	Prince Edward Theatre	Olivier Award nomination
2006	Donkeys' Years by Michael Frayn	Chris Headlingly	Comedy Theatre	Olivier Award nomination
2007	The Country Wife by William Wycherley	Pinchwife	Royal Haymarket Theatre	
2008	The Sea by Edward Bond	Hatch	Royal Haymarket Theatre	
2009	Loot by Joe Orton	Inspector Truscott	Tricycle Theatre	
2010–11	Yes, Prime Minister by Antony Jay and Jonathan Lynn	Jim Hacker	Chichester Festival Theatre and Gielgud Theatre	
2011–12	The Madness of George III by Alan Bennett	George III	National Tour and Apollo Theatre	Olivier Award nomination
2013	King Lear by William Shakespeare	Lear	Theatre Royal, Bath	
2014	Pressure by David Haig	James Stagg	Royal Lyceum Theatre and Chichester Festival Theatre	Also playwright
2015	Someone Who'll Watch Over Me by Frank McGuinness	Michael	Minerva Theatre, Chichester	
2015	Guys and Dolls by Frank Loesser	Nathan Detroit	Chichester Festival Theatre	Olivier Award nomination
2016	Blue/Orange by Joe Penhall	Robert	Young Vic	
2017	Rosencrantz and Guildenstern Are Dead by Tom Stoppard	The Player	The Old Vic	
2018	Pressure by David Haig	James Stagg	Ambassadors Theatre, London	Also playwright
2026	Magic by David Haig	Sir Arthur Conan Doyle	Chichester Festival Theatre	Also playwright

=== Film ===
Year	Title	Role	Notes
1983	A Flame to the Phoenix	Mirek Grabinski	
1984	Dark Enemy	Ash	
1985	Morons from Outer Space	Palatial House Flunkey	
1994	Four Weddings and a Funeral	Bernard, the Groom – Wedding Two	
1995	The Four Corners of Nowhere	Nick	
2002	Rachel's Attic	Adam	
2002	Two Weeks Notice	Howard Wade	
2007	Church Going	Priest	Short
2011	The Half-Light	Man	Short
2016	Florence Foster Jenkins	Carlo Edwards	
2019	Downton Abbey	Mr Wilson	
2026	Pressure	—N/a	Writer

=== Television ===
Year	Title	Role	Notes
1978	The Moon Stallion	Todman	6 episodes
1980	Blake's 7	Forres	Episode: "Rumours of Death"
1980	Doctor Who	Pangol	Serial: "The Leisure Hive"
1981	Diamonds	Alex Randolph	5 episodes
1983	Chessgame	Colin Jenkins	Episode: "Flying Blind"
1986	The Alamut Ambush	Colin Jenkins	TV film
1986	Cold War Killers	Colin Jenkins	TV film
1989	Hannay	Conrad Smyth	Episode: "The Good Samaritan"
1989	Dramarama	Bill Brock	Episode: "Badger"
1990	Campion	Cully Randall/Guffy Randall	2 episodes
1990	Portrait of a Marriage	Harold Nicolson	4 episodes
1991	Chancer	Dr. Haselden	Episode: "Remembrance"
1991	Soldier Soldier	Major Tom Cadman	7 episodes
1992	Inspector Morse	Peter Rhodes	Episode: "Dead on Time"
1992	Boon	Jim Fisk	Episode: "Is There Anybody There?"
1993	The Darling Buds of May	Captain Robert Battersby	2 episodes
1993	The Inspector Alleyn Mysteries	Arthur Wilde	Episode: "A Man Lay Dead"
1993	Cracker	Graham	Serial: "To Say I Love You"
1994	The Bill	Brian Linton	Episode: "Secrets"
1994	Love on a Branch Line	Lionel Virley	4 episodes
1994	Nice Day at the Office	Chris Selwyn	6 episodes
1995	Wycliffe	David Millar	Episode: "Charades"
1995–1996	The Thin Blue Line	D.I. Grim	14 episodes
1997–1998	Keeping Mum	Richard Beare	16 episodes
1998	Talking Heads 2	Wilfred Paterson	Episode: "Playing Sandwiches"
1999	The Adventures of Young Indiana Jones	Colonel Bonnet	Episode: "Tales of Innocence"
2000	Dalziel and Pascoe	David Hallingsworth	Episode: "A Sweeter Lazarus"
2001	Station Jim	Riorden Jnr	TV film
2001	Ivor the Invisible	Park Keeper	Voice; TV film
2002	Crime and Punishment	Luhzin	TV film
2004	Hustle	Sir Anthony Reeves	Episode: "The Last Gamble"
2006	A for Andromeda	General Vandenburg	TV film
2007	Comic Relief 2007: The Big One	Kate's Dad	TV film
2007	My Boy Jack	Rudyard Kipling	TV film; also writer
2008	Dickens Secret Lover	Charles Dickens	TV film
2008	Agatha Christie's Marple: Murder Is Easy	Major Hugh Horton	TV film
2008	Dustbin Baby	Elliot	TV film
2008	The 39 Steps	Sir George Sinclair	TV film
2009	My Family	Jeremy Livingstone	Episode: "The Guru"
2009	Midsomer Murders	George Jeffers	Episode: "The Glitch"
2009	Doc Martin	Mr Strain	2 episodes
2009	The Thick of It	Steve Fleming	2 episodes
2010	Mo	Jon Norton	TV film
2011	Strike Back	Christopher Manning	2 episodes
2013	Yes, Prime Minister	Jim Hacker	6 episodes
2013	The Wright Way	Gerald Wright	6 episodes
2015	Penny Dreadful	Oscar Putney	5 episodes
2015	New Tricks	Dr. Douglas Henway	Episode: "Life Expectancy"
2016	The Witness for the Prosecution	Sir Charles Carter	2 episodes
2018–2022	Killing Eve	Bill Pargrave	4 episodes
2019	One Red Nose Day and a Wedding	Bernard	TV short
2020	Urban Myths	George Frideric Handel	Episode: "Hendrix & Handel"
2020–2023	COBRA	Archie Glover-Morgan	Series regular
2025	Étoile	Nicholas Leutwylek	Main cast
