= Tonie and Valmai Holt =

British military historians

Tonie Holt (10 December 1932 – 5 September 2024) and Valmai Diana Holt MBE (née Williams; 23 December 1935 – 23 June 2026) were British military historians, who wrote military history books and battlefield tour guides under the names Major and Mrs Holt and pioneered the modern battlefield tour industry.

Tonie Holt was a graduate of Sandhurst Military College and was commissioned in the Royal Electrical and Mechanical Engineers in 1953. He later earned an engineering degree from Royal Military College of Science at Shrivenham, Oxfordshire. Later in his British Army career, he served at the Royal Radar Establishment at Malvern, Worcestershire, where he worked on the mortar-locating radar “Project Cymbeline.”

Tonie Holt and Valmai Williams married in 1958. The couple had two children. They collected postcards from World War I, which led them to publish books for other collectors. After Tonie Holt's retirement, they also founded Major & Mrs Holt's Battlefield Tours in the 1980s and led tours of battlefield sites in western Europe, Gallipoli, North Africa, Italy, Crimea, the United States, Vietnam, India and the Falklands through the 1990s. When the Holts sold the company in the late 1990s, they began writing again and published guides to battlefields and books about World War I.

Tonie Holt died on 5 September 2024, aged 91, and Valmai Holt died on 23 June 2026, aged 90.

== Works ==
- Picture Postcards of the Golden Age: A Collector’s Guide (MacGibbon and Kee, 1971) ISBN 0-261-63245-0
- Till the Boys Come Home: The Picture Postcards of the First World War
- The Best of Fragments from France by Captain Bruce Bairnsfather
- In Search of a Better 'Ole: A Biography of Captain Bruce Bairnsfather (Milestone Publications, 1985) ISBN 0-88902-904-0
- I'll be seeing you: World War II through its picture postcards (Moorland Publishing Company, 1987) ISBN 0-86190-201-7
- Battlefields of the First World War: A Traveller's Guide (Trafalgar Square, 1993) ISBN 1-85145-364-4
- Violets from Oversea (Poets of the First World War) (Leo Cooper, 1996), ISBN 0-85052-406-7
- My Boy Jack? The Search for Kipling’s Only Son (1998)
- Battlefield Guide to the Normandy D-Day Landing Beaches (Pen and Sword, 1999) ISBN 0-85052-662-0
- Poets of the Great War (2001)
- The Western Front - South (Major and Mrs Holt's Battlefield Guides) (Pen and Sword Military; CON ILL edition, 2006), ISBN 1-84415-239-1
- * Major & Mrs Holt's Battlefield Guide to the Somme (Pen & Sword Military, 2008) ISBN 0-85052-414-8
- Major And Mrs Holt's Battlefield Guide To Operation Market Garden: Leopoldsville to Arnhem (Major and Mrs Holt's Battlefield Guides) (Pen and Sword Military; Book and Map edition, 2008) ISBN 0-85052-785-6
- D-Day Normandy Landing Beaches (Major & Mrs Holt's Definitive Battlefield Guide) (Pen & Sword Military; 6th Edition with Latitude and Longitude References (2013) ISBN 0-85052-662-0
- Major and Mrs. Holt’s Definitive Battlefield Guide to Western Front-North (Major and Mrs Holt's Battlefield Guides) (Pen & Sword Military; New edition, 2018) ISBN 1-5267-4683-2
