= Sir Thomas Blount, 1st Baronet =

17th-century English politician and writer

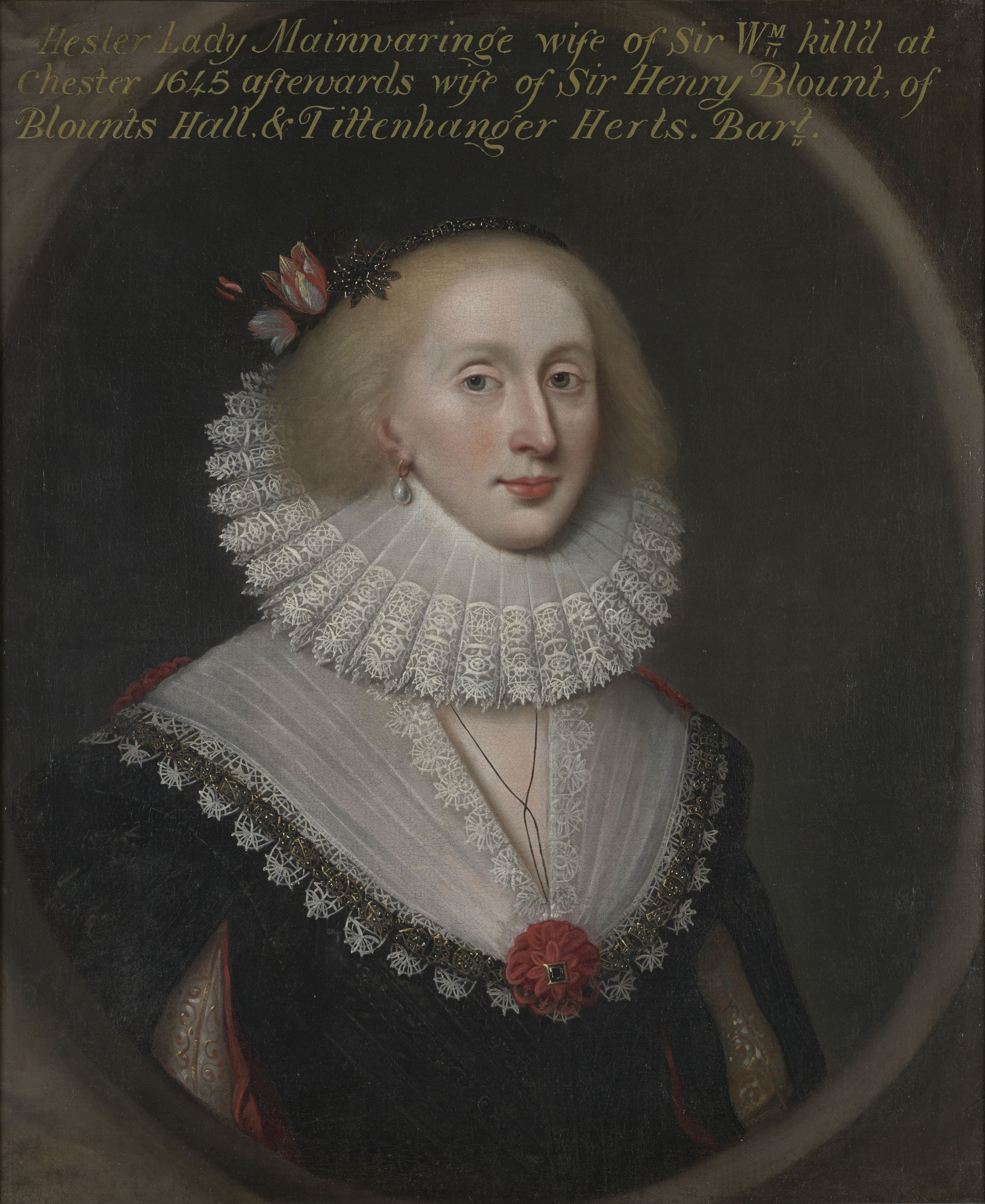
Thomas Blount was the son of Henry and Hester Blount (pictured).

Sir Thomas Pope Blount, 1st Baronet (12 September 1649 – 27 January 1697) was an English politician and essayist.

== Life ==
Thomas Pope Blount was born on 12 September 1649 at Upper Holloway, Islington, London. He was the eldest son of Sir Henry Blount and Hester, the widow of Sir Henry Mainwaring. (The manor house of Upper Holloway had been inherited by his mother from her father Christopher Wase.) Thomas was the brother of Charles Blount, a prominent deist philosopher and writer. Thomas married on 22 July 1669 Jane Caesar, the daughter of Sir Henry Caesar. The couple had fourteen children.

He was admitted to Lincoln's Inn on 1 December 1668. In December 1678 he inherited Tyttenhanger House, Hertfordshire from his mother, before succeeding to the remainder of the family estate on the death of his father in 1682. He was the member of parliament for St Albans between 1679 and 1681 and for Hertfordshire between 1689 and 1697. A loyal Whig, he was a member of the Green Ribbon Club. He was a commissioner under the Public Accounts Act between 1694 and 1697.

Blount was created a baronet during the life of his father on 27 January 1680. On his death the title passed to his son, Sir Thomas Pope Blount, 2nd Baronet.

== Works ==
- Censura celebrorum authorum sive tractatus in quo varia virorum doctorum de clarissimis cujusque seculi scriptoribus judicia traduntur (1690)
- Essays on Several Subjects (1691, 2nd ed. 1692) [spelling in the original]
  - I. That INTEREST Governs the World: And that Popery is nothing but Priest-Craft, or an Invention of the Priests to get Money.
  - II. The great Mischief and Prejudice of LEARNING. And that a Wise Man ought to be preferr'd before a Man of LEARNING.
  - III. Of Education, and Custome; The great Influence it hath upon most Men. But that a good Education is not al∣way Effectual.
  - IV. Of the Ancients: And the Respect that is due unto them: That we should not too much enslave our selves to their Opinions.
  - V. Whether the Men of this present Age are any way inferiour to those of former Ages, either in respect of Vertue, Learning, or long Life.
  - VI. Of Passion: And whether the Passions are an Advantage, or Disadvantage to Men.
  - VII. The Variety of Opinions: Whence it proceeds: The uncertainty of Humane Knowledge.
- A Natural History, containing many not common observations extracted out of the best modern writers (1693)
- De re poetica, or remarks upon Poetry, with Characters and Censures of the most considerable Poets (1694)

In 1697 Blount added an essay that has been described as openly deistic. His Censura celebrorum authorum sive tractatus in quo varia virorum doctorum de clarissimis cujusque seculi scriptoribus judicia traduntur (1690) was originally compiled for Blount's own use, and is a dictionary in chronological order of what various eminent writers have said about one another. This involved enormous labour in Blount's time. It was published at Geneva in 1694 with all the quotations from modern languages translated into Latin, and again in 1710.

Baronetage of England
New title	Baronet (of Tittenhanger); 1679–1697	Succeeded by Thomas Pope Blount
