= Blount baronets of Tittenhanger (1680) =

Extinct baronetcy in the Baronetage of England

Blount baronets
- Blount baronets of Tittenhanger
- Creation date: 1680
- Status: extinct
- Extinction date: 1757
- Seat: Tittenhanger
- Former seats: Blount's Hall, Staffordshire
- Motto: καλά, The good

The Blount Baronetcy, of Tittenhanger in the County of Hertford, was created in the Baronetage of England on 27 January 1680 for Thomas Pope Blount (born 1649). In the 16th century Elizabeth Blount, daughter of Sir Walter Blount of Blount Hall, Staffordshire (a descendant of the Sodington Blounts), married Sir Thomas Pope of Tittenhanger, Herefordshire. Her nephew Sir Thomas Pope Blount (died 1638) inherited the estate at Tittenhanger on her death. The first Baronet was the grandson of Sir Thomas and son of the traveller Sir Henry Blount. He represented St Albans and Hertfordshire in the House of Commons. The title became extinct on the death of his grandson, the third Baronet, in 1757.

== Blount baronets, of Tittenhanger (1680) ==
- Sir Thomas Pope Blount, 1st Baronet (1649–1697)
- Sir Thomas Pope Blount, 2nd Baronet (1670–1731)
- Sir Harry Pope Blount, 3rd Baronet (1702–1757)

== See also ==
- Blount baronets
