= Tyttenhanger House =

Country house in Hertfordshire, England

Coordinates: 51°43′40″N 0°16′34″W

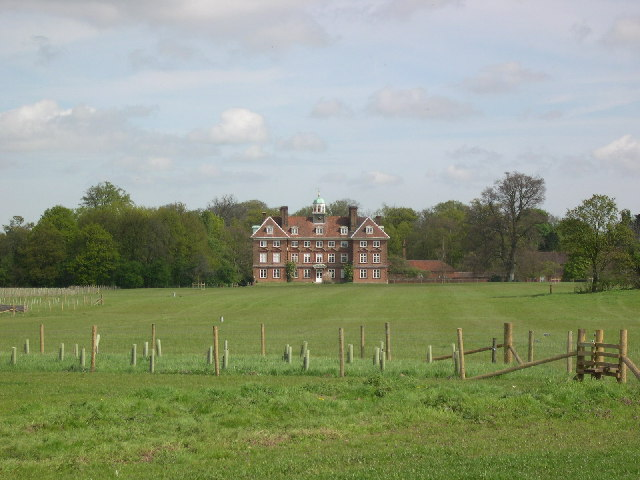
Tyttenhanger House

Tyttenhanger House is a 17th-century country mansion, now converted into commercial offices, at Tyttenhanger, near St Albans, Hertfordshire. It is a Grade I listed building.

== History ==
The Tyttenhanger estate was owned by the Abbey of St Albans until the Dissolution of the Monasteries and was then granted by the Crown in 1547 to Sir Thomas Pope, founder of Trinity College, Oxford. Pope died without issue in 1559 and left the estate to his wife Elizabeth, daughter of Sir Walter Blount of Blounts Hall, Staffordshire. On her death it passed to her nephew Sir Thomas Pope Blount (1552–1638), who was High Sheriff of Hertfordshire in 1598.

Blount's nephew, Sir Henry Blount (1602–1682), High Sheriff in 1661, demolished Pope's manor house and built the present mansion on the site in 1654/5. The house which was altered and extended in the 18th century presents an impressive entrance front of three storeys with attics and nine bays. The central five bays topped by a belfry, are flanked by projecting two bayed wings

The adjacent stable block, also of 17th-century origin, now converted to residential use, is a Grade II listed building.

Sir Henry's son Thomas Pope Blount (1649–1697) was created the first of the Blount baronets in 1680. On the death of the third Baronet in 1757 the estate passed to his niece and heiress Catherine Freeman, whose daughter married Charles Yorke, second son of the first Earl of Hardwicke and whose grandson Philip become the third Earl. In the 1780s, Philip's stepmother Agneta Yorke managed the estate until he came of age, during which time she commissioned alterations by architect John Soane. Field-Marshal Harold Rupert Leofric George Alexander (1891–1969), who after successfully managing the British 1st Army in North Africa and Italy, from 1941 lived at Tyttenhanger House.

The family retained ownership until 1973 when the house was converted for use as commercial offices.
