= Charles Yorke (disambiguation) =

Charles Yorke (1722–1770) was Lord Chancellor of Great Britain.

Charles Yorke may also refer to:

- Charles Philip Yorke (1764–1834), British politician
- Charles Yorke (British Army officer) (1790–1880)
- Charles Yorke, 4th Earl of Hardwicke (1799–1873), British naval commander and Conservative politician
- Charles Yorke, 5th Earl of Hardwicke (1836–1897), British aristocrat, Conservative politician, dandy and bankrupt
- Charles Yorke, 8th Earl of Hardwicke (1869–1936), British peer
