= Earl of Hardwicke =

Earldom in the Peerage of Great Britain

Earldom of Hardwicke
- Yorke arms Argent on a saltire azure a bezant
- Creation date: 1754
- Created by: George II
- Peerage: Peerage of Great Britain
- First holder: Philip Yorke, 1st Baron Hardwicke
- Present holder: Joseph Yorke, 10th Earl of Hardwicke
- Heir apparent: Philip Alexander Joseph Yorke
- Subsidiary titles: Viscount Royston; Baron Hardwicke
- Status: Extant
- Former seat: Wimpole Hall

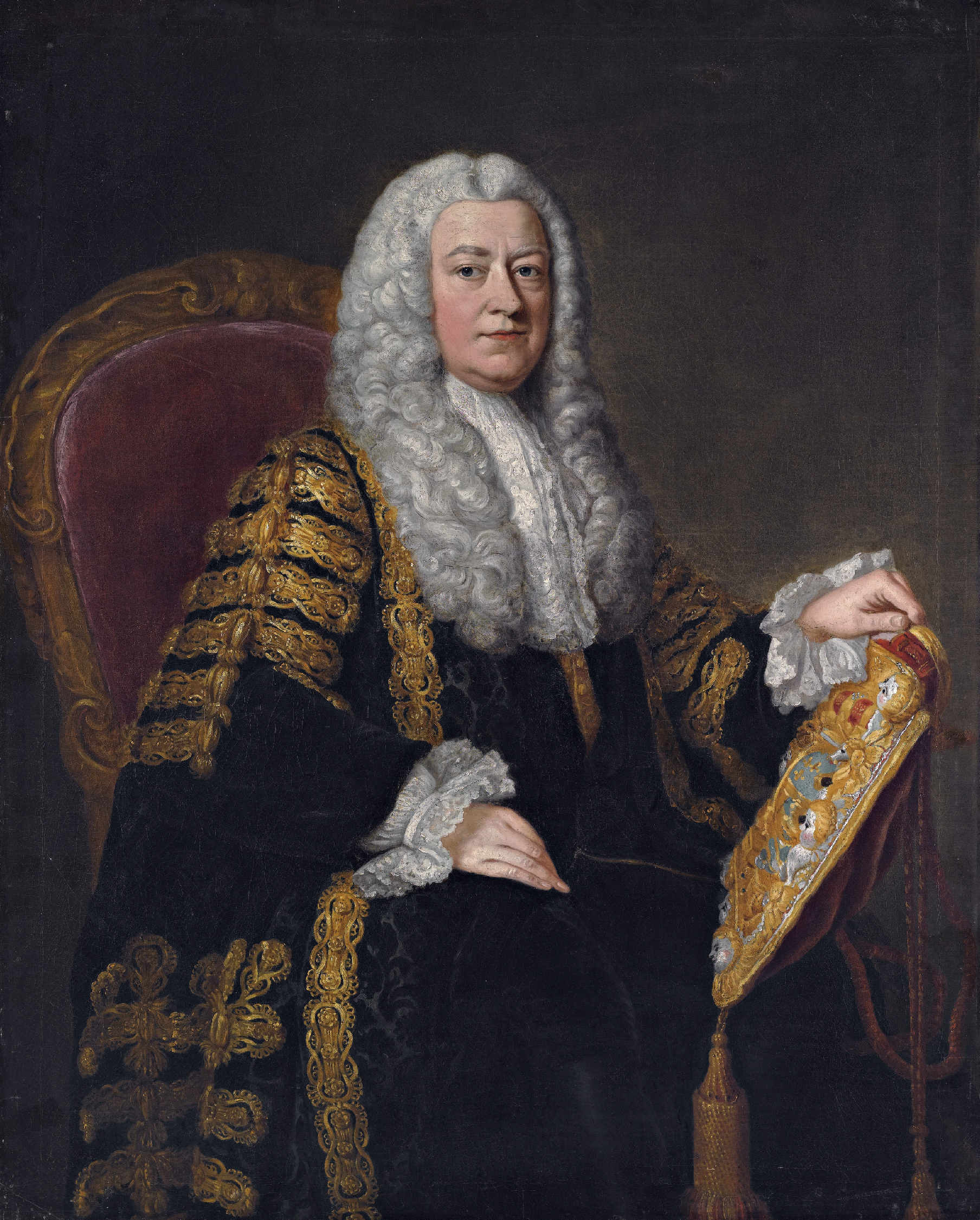
Philip Yorke, 1st Earl of Hardwicke

Earl of Hardwicke is a title in the Peerage of Great Britain. It was created in 1754 for Philip Yorke, 1st Baron Hardwicke, Lord High Chancellor of Great Britain from 1737 to 1756. He had already been created Baron Hardwicke, of Hardwicke in the County of Gloucestershire, in 1733, and was made Viscount Royston at the same time as he was given the earldom. These titles were also in the Peerage of Great Britain.

The first earl was succeeded by his eldest son, who represented Reigate and Cambridgeshire in the House of Commons and served as Lord Lieutenant of Cambridgeshire. Lord Hardwicke married Lady Jemima Campbell, only daughter of John Campbell, 3rd Earl of Breadalbane, and granddaughter and heiress of Henry Grey, 1st Duke of Kent, who succeeded her grandfather as Marchioness Grey in 1722 (a title which became extinct on her death). They had two daughters, the eldest of whom was Lady Amabel, who was created Countess De Grey on her own right in 1816.

Lord Hardwicke was succeeded by his nephew, the third Earl. He was the son of the Hon. Charles Yorke, second son of the first Earl. He was a prominent politician and served as Lord Lieutenant of Ireland between 1801 and 1805. Lord Hardwicke died without surviving male issues and was succeeded by his nephew, the fourth Earl. He was the son of Vice-Admiral Sir Joseph Sydney Yorke, the third son of the aforementioned Charles Yorke. Like his father he was a Vice-Admiral in the Royal Navy. Also, he held political office in the first two Conservative administrations of the Earl of Derby as Postmaster General and as Lord Privy Seal.

His son, the fifth Earl, was also a Conservative politician and served under Derby as Comptroller of the Household and under Benjamin Disraeli as Master of the Buckhounds. He was succeeded by his son, the sixth Earl. He also held political office and served in the Conservative administrations of Lord Salisbury and Arthur Balfour as Under-Secretary of State for the Colonies and Under-Secretary of State for War. However, he died unmarried at an early age and was succeeded by his uncle, the seventh Earl. He was a Captain in the Royal Navy. His eldest son, the eighth Earl, was succeeded by his nephew, the ninth Earl. He was the son of the Hon. Alfred Ernest Frederick Yorke, second son of the seventh Earl. As of 2017 the titles are held by the ninth Earl's grandson, the tenth Earl, who succeeded in 1974. He is the only son of Philip Yorke, Viscount Royston (d. 1973), only son of the ninth Earl.

== Other family members ==
Numerous other members of the Yorke family have also gained distinction. The Honourable Charles Yorke, second son of the first Earl, was also Lord Chancellor of Great Britain. He was the father of 1) the third Earl, 2) Charles Philip Yorke, Home Secretary between 1803 and 1804, and 3) Sir Joseph Sydney Yorke, an Admiral in the Royal Navy, who was the father of the Honourable Eliot Yorke, Member of Parliament for Cambridgeshire. The Honourable Joseph Yorke, third son of the first Earl, was a soldier, politician and diplomat and was created Baron Dover in 1788. The Honourable John Yorke, fourth son of the first Earl, sat as Member of Parliament for Reigate and Higham Ferrers. The Right Reverend the Honourable James Yorke, fifth son of the first Earl, was Bishop of Ely. He was the father of 1) Joseph Yorke, who was the father of Joseph Yorke, Member of Parliament for Reigate, who was the father of John Yorke, a Conservative politician, who was the grandfather of the author Henry Green; and 2) Reverend Philip Yorke, who was the father of Colonel Philip James Yorke (1799–1874), a Fellow of the Royal Society, and Reginald Yorke (1803–1870), a Rear-Admiral in the Royal Navy.

Lady Jemima Yorke, wife of the second Earl, succeeded her maternal grandfather as Marchioness Grey in 1740. Lady Amabel Yorke, elder daughter of the second Earl, was created Countess de Grey in 1816 (see Marquess of Ripon). Lady Mary Yorke, the younger daughter of the second Earl, was the mother of Prime Minister F. J. Robinson, 1st Earl of Ripon. Philip Yorke, Viscount Royston, eldest son of the third Earl, was Member of Parliament for Reigate. The Honourable Elliot Yorke, fourth son of the fourth Earl, was a Member of Parliament for Cambridgeshire. Sir William Yorke, 1st Baronet, cousin of the first Earl, was a judge in Ireland.

== Earls of Hardwicke (1754) ==
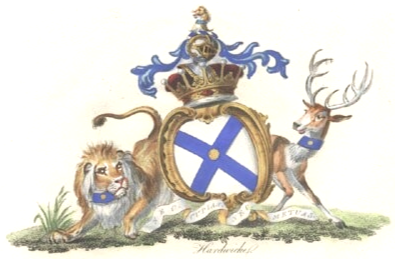
Arms of the Earls of Hardwicke.

- Philip Yorke, 1st Earl of Hardwicke (1690–1764)
- Philip Yorke, 2nd Earl of Hardwicke (1720–1790)
- Philip Yorke, 3rd Earl of Hardwicke (1757–1834)
  - Philip Yorke, Viscount Royston (1784–1808)
  - Charles James Yorke, Viscount Royston (1797–1810)
- Charles Philip Yorke, 4th Earl of Hardwicke (1799–1873)
- Charles Philip Yorke, 5th Earl of Hardwicke (1836–1897)
- Albert Edward Phillip Henry Yorke, 6th Earl of Hardwicke (1867–1904)
- John Manners Yorke, 7th Earl of Hardwicke (1840–1909)
- Charles Alexander Yorke, 8th Earl of Hardwicke (1869–1936)
- Philip Grantham Yorke, 9th Earl of Hardwicke (1906–1974)
  - Philip Simon Prospero Lindley Rupert Yorke, Viscount Royston (1938–1973)
- Joseph Philip Sebastian Yorke, 10th Earl of Hardwicke (b. 1971)

The heir apparent is the present holder's son, Philip Alexander Joseph Yorke, Viscount Royston (b. 2009).

Line of succession (simplified)
- Philip Yorke, 1st Earl of Hardwicke (1690–1764)
  - Philip Yorke, 2nd Earl of Hardwicke (1720–1790)
  - The Rt Hon Charles Yorke (1722–1770)
    - Philip Yorke, 3rd Earl of Hardwicke (1757–1854)
      - Philip Yorke, Viscount Royston (1784–1808)
      - The Hon. Charles Yorke (1787–1791)
      - Charles Yorke, Viscount Royston (1797–1810)
      - The Hon. Joseph Yorke (1800–1801)
    - The Rt Hon Charles Philip Yorke (1764–1834)
    - Sir Joseph Sydney Yorke (1768–1831)
      - Charles Yorke, 4th Earl of Hardwicke (1799–1873)
        - Charles Yorke, 5th Earl of Hardwicke (1836–1897)
          - Albert Yorke, 6th Earl of Hardwicke (1867–1904)
        - John Yorke, 7th Earl of Hardwicke (1840–1909)
          - Charles Yorke, 8th Earl of Hardwicke (1869–1936)
          - The Hon. Alfred Yorke (1871–1928)
            - Philip Yorke, 9th Earl of Hardwicke (1906–1974)
              - Philip Yorke, Viscount Royston (1938–1973)
                - Joseph Yorke, 10th Earl of Hardwicke (b. 1971)
                  - (1) Philip Yorke, Viscount Royston (b. 2009)
          - The Hon. Claude Yorke (1872–1940)
            - David Yorke (1919–1997)
              - (2) Charles Yorke (b. 1951)
              - (3) James Yorke (b. 1954)
                - (4) Philip Yorke (b. 1987)
                - (5) Henry Yorke (b. 1991)
  - Joseph Yorke, 1st Baron Dover (1724–1792)
  - The Right Rev James Yorke (1730–1804)
    - male issue and descendants in remainder

== Works cited ==
- Hesilrige, Arthur G. M. (1921). Debrett's Peerage and Titles of courtesy. London, UK: Dean & Son. p. 445.
- Morris, Susan; Bosberry-Scott, Wendy; Belfield, Gervase, eds. (2018). Debrett's Peerage and Baronetage. Vol. I. New York: St Martin's Press. pp. P547–P548. ISBN 978-1-9997-6700-6.
