= Agneta Yorke =

English noblewoman and amateur artist (1740 – 1820)

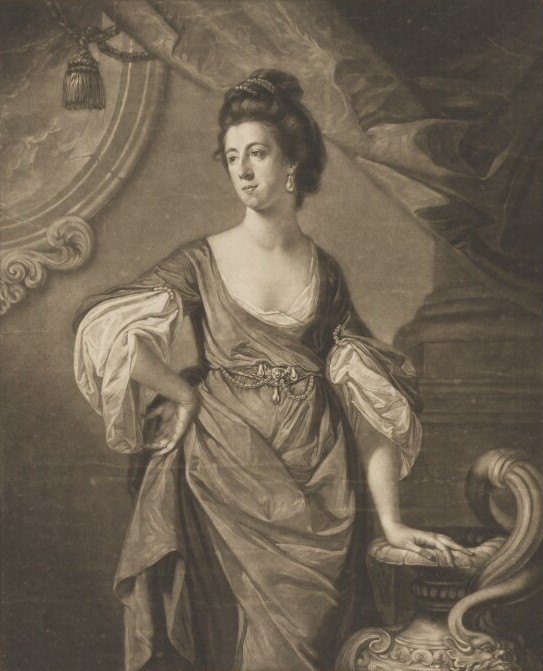
Mezzotint based on Cotes' portrait of Agneta Yorke, published 1768.

Agneta Yorke (née Johnston, 1740 – 1820) was an English noblewoman and amateur pastellist and engraver.

== Life ==
She was born in 1740 as the second daughter and co-heiress of Henry Johnston (or Johnson) of Great Berkhemsptead. In 1769 she became the second wife of Lord Chancellor Charles Yorke. They had three children: politician Charles Philip Yorke, amateur artist Caroline, and naval officer Joseph Sydney Yorke. Her stepson by Charles' first marriage was Philip Yorke, who became 3rd Earl of Hardwicke.

When her husband died in January 1770, Agneta was responsible for managing the estate, including Tyttenhanger House, until her stepson came of age in 1778.

Agneta is thought to have been trained as an artist by Catherine Read. She exhibited works in pastels at the Society of Artists between 1771 and 1775. Her daughter Caroline also produced prints.

In the 1780s, Agneta moved to Southampton to follow her son Joseph's naval career. In 1792, she commissioned a house - Sydney Lodge, Hamble - to be built by John Soane, who had carried out some alterations for her at Tyttenhanger House.

Agneta's portrait was painted by George Romney, Francis Cotes and Catherine Read.

She died in 1820. There is a monument to her at Wimpole Church, Cambridgeshire.
