= Cambridgeshire Militia =

British auxiliary military unit, 1558–1908

Cambridgeshire Militia 4th Battalion, Suffolk Regiment
- Active: 1558–1908
- Country: England 1558–1707; Kingdom of Great Britain (1707–1800); United Kingdom (1801–1908)
- Branch: Militia
- Role: Infantry
- Size: 1 Battalion
- Garrison/HQ: Ely
- Engagements: Battle of Worcester; Battle of Landguard Fort

Commanders
- Notable commanders: Oliver Cromwell; James Howard, 3rd Earl of Suffolk; Thomas Bromley, 2nd Baron Montfort; Philip Yorke, 3rd Earl of Hardwicke; Col Charles Philip Yorke

The Cambridgeshire Militia was an auxiliary military regiment in the English county of Cambridgeshire and the Isle of Ely. From their formal organisation as Trained Bands and their service during the Armada Crisis and in the English Civil Wars, the Militia of Cambridgeshire served during times of international tension and all of Britain's major wars. The regiment provided internal security and home defence but sometimes operated further afield, relieving regular troops from routine garrison duties and acting as a source of trained officers and men for the British Army. It later became a battalion of the Suffolk Regiment until its final disbandment in 1908.

== Early history ==
The English militia was descended from the Anglo-Saxon Fyrd, the military force raised from the freemen of the shires under command of their Sheriff. It continued under the Norman and Plantagenet kings and was reorganised under the Assizes of Arms of 1181 and 1252, and again by the Statute of Winchester of 1285. Under the Tudors the legal basis of the militia was updated by two acts of 1557 covering musters (4 & 5 Ph. & M. c. 3) and the maintenance of horses and armour (4 & 5 Ph. & M. c. 2), which placed the county militia under a Lord Lieutenant appointed by the monarch and assisted by deputy lieutenants. The entry into force of these acts in 1558 is seen as the starting date for the organised county militia in England.

== Cambridge Trained Bands ==
Although the militia obligation was universal, it was clearly impractical to train and equip every able-bodied man, so after 1572 the practice was to select a proportion of men for the Trained Bands (TBs), who were mustered for regular training. The cost was borne by the counties: Cambridgeshire estimated that it cost 8 pence a day for a musketeer's ammunition, so the three musters a year would cost 13 shillings and 8 pence for each of its 200 'shot'. In 1584 the county also had 100 bowmen and 200 'corslets' (signifying armoured pikemen). The Armada Crisis in 1588 led to the TBs being mustered in April. Cambridgeshire produced 1000 armed foot, of whom 500 were trained, and 170 mounted men: 50 lancers, 40 light horse and 80 'petronels' (the petronel was an early cavalry firearm).

In the 16th Century little distinction was made between the militia and the troops levied by the counties for overseas expeditions. However, the counties usually conscripted the unemployed and criminals rather than send the trained bandsmen. Between 1585 and 1602 Cambridgeshire supplied 572 men for service in Ireland, 150 for France and 450 for the Netherlands. The men were given 'conduct money' to get to the ports of embarkation. Conduct money was recovered from the government, but the cost replacing the weapons issued to the levies from the militia armouries was a heavy charge on the counties.

With the passing of the threat of invasion, the TBs declined in the early 17th Century. Later, King Charles I attempted to reform them into a national force or 'Perfect Militia' answering to the king rather than local control. In 1638 the Cambridge TBs mustered 1000 foot armed with 540 muskets and 460 corslets, and 80 mounted men consisting of 30 carabiniers and 50 dragoons.

=== Bishops' Wars ===
The TBs were called upon to send contingents for the First Bishops' War in 1639, and Sir Simon Harcourt's Regiment of Foot was drawn from the Cambridgeshire, Essex and Suffolk TBs. The King's commander, the Marquis of Hamilton, complained that the Cambridge and Essex men were almost entirely untrained and improperly armed. The officers were inexperienced, and Hamilton had too few trained TB men to provide enough non-commissioned officers (NCOs). In April 1639 Harcourt's regiment was one of those shipped to the Firth of Forth and landed on the island of Inchcolm. However, the Covenanters onshore were too strong for Hamilton to attempt a landing. In May the regiments were re-embarked and sailed back to anchor off Dunbar, later continuing to Holy Island, where they arrived on 28 May. They marched to Berwick-upon-Tweed and in June were present at the final stand-off between the armies between Birks and Duns Law on the border. After that the army was dispersed to its homes.

In March 1640 Cambridgeshire was ordered to send 300 men to Great Yarmouth to be shipped to Newcastle upon Tyne for the Second Bishops' War. The campaign collapsed when the English army was defeated at the Battle of Newburn.

=== Civil Wars ===
Control of the TBs was one of the major points of dispute between Charles I and Parliament that led to the First English Civil War. When open warfare broke out between the King and Parliament, neither side made much use of the TBs beyond securing the county armouries for their own full-time troops who would serve anywhere in the country, many of whom were former trained bandsmen, or as auxiliary units for garrisons. Cambridgeshire was firmly under Parliamentary control as part of the Eastern Association. In July 1643 Oliver Cromwell was appointed Governor of the Isle of Ely and given command of the TB unit (of 8 companies) called out to garrison the city of Ely. This may have been an 'auxiliary' unit called out for extended garrison service, rather than the normal TBs who only served for short periods. The regiment may have been represented at the taking of Sleaford and Crowland in October 1643. These towns were lost to the Royalists again in 1644, and Cromwell's TB regiment may have been involved in the siege of Crowland in October. that year. A Royalist relieving force was defeated at Grantham and Crowland surrendered in December. Lieutenant-Colonel Dodson of Cromwell's TB was placed in command of the garrison in January 1645 with 80 foot and 20 horse. Francis Russell took over from Cromwell as colonel of the regiment in August 1645, when it was ordered to be 500 foot and 100 dragoons. He in turn was succeeded in command by Col Valentine Walton in 1648. After the end of the First Civil War the regiment continued to garrison the Isle of Ely in 1646–7, when its strength was 464–477 foot and 42 dragoons.

As Parliament tightened its grip on the country after the First English Civil War it passed new Militia Acts in 1648 and 1650 that replaced lords lieutenant with county commissioners appointed by Parliament or the Council of State. From now on the term 'Trained Band' began to disappear in most counties. Under the Commonwealth and Protectorate the militia received pay when called out, and operated alongside the New Model Army to control the country. During the Scottish invasion of the Third English Civil War in 1651, English county militia regiments were called upon to supplement the New Model Army. On 1 August Col Valentine Walton (by now governor of King's Lynn) was ordered to assemble a regiment of 1000 men, five companies to be drawn from the regular garrisons the other five from the Militia of Norfolk, Suffolk and the Isle of Ely, with their militia weapons. Under the command of Major Blake the regiment marched towards a rendezvous at Barnet, north of London, then was redirected towards Northampton and then Buckingham. It then took part in the Battle of Worcester. Meanwhile the rest of the Cambridgeshire Militia had been ordered to a militia rendezvous at Oxford, but was not present at Worcester.

== Restoration Militia ==
After the Restoration of the Monarchy, the English Militia was re-established by the Militia Act of 1661 under the control of the king's lords lieutenant, the men to be selected by ballot. This was popularly seen as the 'Constitutional Force' to counterbalance a 'Standing Army' tainted by association with the New Model Army that had supported Cromwell's's military dictatorship, and almost the whole burden of home defence and internal security was entrusted to the militia. James Howard, 3rd Earl of Suffolk, was re-appointed Lord Lieutenant of Cambridgeshire (and Suffolk), having previously held the post in 1640–42. He personally held the colonelcy of the Suffolk regiment of horse militia, and was also governor of Landguard Fort at Felixstowe.

The Cambridge Militia were called out in 1666 when a Dutch invasion was threatened, and again the following year when the Dutch carried out a devastating Raid on the Medway in June. The distinguished soldier Lord Berkeley of Stratton was appointed Lieutenant-General of Militia for Suffolk, Cambridgeshire and the Isle of Ely, and by 13 June he and his staff had established the regional defence headquarters at Harwich. After the Medway raid, the Dutch fleet cruised off the Suffolk coast before landing to attack Landguard Fort on 2 July. A Troop of Cambridgeshire Militia Horse was present with two Suffolk troops, and came under fire from small cannon when they threatened the Dutch beachhead. The Earl of Suffolk used them to harry the Dutch retreat and evacuation from the beach after the failed attack on Landguard, though the Dutch flank guard in the hedges prevented the horse from coming to close quarters. The Earl of Suffolk discharged the militia, both horse and foot, to their homes on 10 July, even though some Dutch warships could still be seen off the coast until 21 July when peace was signed.

The militia continued to function fitfully during the rest of the century, being called out during an invasion scare in 1690. In 1697 the counties were required to submit detailed lists of their militia. Cambridgeshire and the Isle of Ely had five independent companies of foot and three troops of horse:

- Cambridge (town): 1 Company
- East Division: 1 Company + 1 Troop
- West Division: 1 Company + 1 Troop
- Wisbech: 1 Company
- Ely: 1 Company + 1 Troop

A total of 677 foot and 1561 horse.

The Militia passed into virtual abeyance during the long peace after the Treaty of Utrecht in 1712, although elements were called out during the Jacobite risings of 1715 and 1745.

== 1759 reforms ==
Under threat of French invasion during the Seven Years' War a series of Militia Acts from 1757 resuscitated the county militia regiments, the men being conscripted by means of parish ballots (paid substitutes were permitted) to serve for three years. There was a property qualification for officers, who were commissioned by the lord lieutenant. Cambridgeshire was given a quota of 480 men to raise. However, the new lord lieutenant was Viscount Royston, whose father the Earl of Hardwicke had opposed the Militia Bill in Parliament, and he was not enthusiastic. He appointed a political ally, Thomas Bromley, 2nd Baron Montfort, as Lieutenant-Colonel Commandant of the regiment, (Note: With only six companies the regiment was not entitled to a full colonel.) but doubted that enough qualified men could be found in the county willing to accept commissions. It took over a year to find sufficient officers and to raise the men. The government would only issue arms from the Tower of London to militia regiments when they had enrolled 60 per cent of their quota: for Cambridgeshire this was on 3 September 1759. And although the regiment carried out the required musters and training, it was not embodied for full time service in the Seven Years War, unlike all the regiments previously completed, and all but one other of those completed by August 1760. In 1761 all the officers resigned, and there were delays in arranging a new ballot after the men's three-year term of service expired. Eventually, after the war had ended, Cambridgeshire reluctantly reformed its regiment in 1764 to avoid paying a fine. Thereafter the regiment was called out for its periodic peacetime training.

The method of call-up for training is illustrated by this newspaper announcement:

CAMBRIDGESHIRE. MILITIA. a General Meeting of Majesty's Lieutenancy for the County of Cambridge, held this Day at the Rose Tavern in Cambridge, It was Ordered, that the Militia Forces raised in and for the said County, to assemble and meet together at the said Cambridge, on Friday the 22d of Day May instant, to be there trained and exercised for the space of twenty-eight Days together; of which all Persons serving in the said Militia are hereby required to take Notice and attend accordingly. Dated this Eleventh Day of May, 1767.

However, the regiment never mustered more than 430 rank and file at annual training out of an establishment of 480, although the men were generally well-behaved. As early as 1762 Lord Royston criticised Lord Montfort's behaviour, such that no gentleman wished to serve under him. Of the subalterns appointed under Montfort's command, few had any education, one was an innkeeper, one a breeches-make, and another had ambitions to be a butler.

At the end of the training on Friday 27 May 1774, the men were paraded on Market Hill in Cambridge to hand in their weapons and uniforms. Montfort was insulted and knocked down by members of Cambridge University who disliked him because of his links to the town corporation (Town and gown riots were common in the town). Montfort ordered his men to come to him, but they hesitated until urged on by some bystanders. Then a fight broke out and all of the regiment except the Grenadier Company ran into the crowd, some using their musket butts, and some with fixed bayonets. They chased the crowd down Pump Lane towards St Mary's and inflicted several casualties. At length Montfort dismissed his men, ordering the guard to lock their door, while the university Vice-chancellor ordered all college gates to be locked.

n 1775 Montfort fled to Paris to avoid his creditors but retained command of the Cambridgeshire Militia because of the patronage he could bestow on his friends, and the prospect of pay if war broke out with the American Colonies. In 1776 the new adjutant, Anthony Tolver, criticised the regiment for its 'obstinate unmilitary spirit'.

=== American War of Independence ===
The militia was called out during the War of American Independence when the country was threatened with invasion by the Americans' allies, France and Spain. The Cambridgeshire Militia was embodied for permanent service on 31 March 1778. Led by the Member of Parliament (MP) for Cambridgeshire, Sir John Hynde Cotton, 4th Baronet, the Deputy Lieutenants met on 9 April and demanded the dismissal of Lord Montfort. Lord Royston (now 2nd Earl of Hardwicke) was uneasy at this, but Cotton advised that 'if there was no precedent for turning a peer out of a commission there was also none for such a peer having one'. Montfort had sold all his property in Cambridgeshire and so was no longer qualified for the position. Montfort complained that losing his command would mean a loss of five or six hundred pounds to him, but Hardwicke used his position to get promotion in the army for Montfort's son. He then appointed Thomas Watson Ward as Lieutenant-Colonel Commandant in his place. At first Ward was active in reforming the regiment, but he failed to address the quarrels among his officers. The worst of these was between the efficient but quarrelsome adjutant Lt Tolver and the newly-appointed major, Sir John Cotton's eldest son John, who wished to remove the older officers who were not gentlemen. Each was placed under arrest at various times and compromise between the two cliques was only brought about when there was a small mutiny among the men. Cotton eventually resigned and was replaced as major by the senior captain, William Stevenson.

After its embodiment, the regiment was reviewed in May 1778 by Lieutenant-General Sir Richard Pierson before marching into Essex, where it joined an encampment. That winter it was stationed at Ipswich, which provided opportunities for socialising:

Monday 18th January 1779] being her Majesty's birthday, the Cambridgeshire militia quartered here in Ipswich fired a feu de joye and 3 vollies. There was also a grand dinner at Bamford's in honour of the day, at which were present a number of ladies and gentlemen, and in the evening there was a ball.

The militia were under strict military discipline while embodied: 'A man in the Cambridgeshire militia having been detected in stealing goods from Mr. Layman of this town, after receiving 150 lashes on Tuesday last, was drummed out of the regiment'. The quality of the men was causing concern. In 1778 only 60 out of the 460 rank and file were balloted men, or 'principals': the remainder were paid substitutes, and when a ballot was held the following year one of the Deputy Lieutenants, Sir Thomas Hatton, 8th Baronet, thought that not 20 out of the 353 men to be chosen would serve in person. Lieutenant-Col Ward complained that the substitutes from Wisbech Hundred that year were the worst he had ever seen. Ward also thought that his men were a 'sleepier sort than those of other counties', and that being almost all illiterate it was hard to find NCOs among them. However, in the summer of 1779 the regiment was sent to Warley Camp in Essex under Lt-Gen GeorgeParker., who was a Cambridgeshire man and very helpful to the regiment. He lent it several Irish sergeants from other regiments, and these brought about a remarkable improvement. The camp was twice visited by the Commander-in-Chief, Lord Amherst: on the first occasion the Cambridgeshires could do little but march past, on the second they could perform all the movements.

In 1780 the regiment was marching towards St Albans in Hertfordshire en route to Tiptree in Essex when it was stopped at Hampstead to help suppress the Gordon Riots then raging in London.

The regiment was still struggling with a shortage of junior officers – in 1780 the former innkeeper and the would-be butler were still in the regiment, while the adjutant, quartermaster and two surgeons each had to be commissioned to make up the numbers, and there were still two vacancies. In 1782 the regiment was camped at Hopton Warren, near Great Yarmouth. The 1778 men having completed their three years' service the regiment was full of new recruits once more. However, the general in command was surprised how much they could do by the end of the camp.

Following the agreement of the Treaty of Paris ending the war, the regiment was disembodied in 1783

From 1784 to 1792 the militia were supposed to assemble for 28 days' annual training, even though to save money only two-thirds of the men were actually called out each year. Those failing to appear at the annual muster were treated as deserters, and lists of those not attending were published. On this occasion nearly 100 were named:

REGIMENT of CAMBRIDGESHIRE MILITIA. WHEREAS the following Private Militia Men belonging to the above named Regiment did not join the Regiment at annual exercise for the year 1789, pursuant to the act of parliament in that case made.

CAMBRIDGESHIRE MILITIA. NOTICE is hereby given, THAT the Battalion of CAMBRIDGESHIRE MILITIA is to assemble at ELY, on TUESDAY the Eighth Day of May next, there to be trained and exercised for Twenty - eight Days from that Time. HARDWICKE. April 14th, 1792. The Act directs, that every Militia Man or Substitute, as well those who exercised last Year, as those who were dismissed, who shall not appear at the Time and Place appointed, shall be deemed a Deserter, and shall forfeit and pay the Sum of Twenty Pounds, or, in Default of Payment, shall be committed to Prison for Six Months, or until he shall have paid the said Penalty.

Traditionally the uniforms and weapons of the disembodied militia were entrusted by the captains to the care of the churchwardens. A new Militia Act in 1786 assigned the responsibility for proper storage to the lord lieutenant and the colonel. The Act reduced the number of permanent NCOs and drummers, and decreed that a third of them should always be at the new armoury, under the command of the adjutant. Lieutenant Tolver was therefore established in a house at Ely, with a rented storeroom for the armoury and an armourer employed there. From 1802 the lieutenancies were empowered to hire or erect storehouses at county expense, giving the militia permanent headquarters and regimental depots for the first time.

Lieutenant-Col Ward's financial mismanagement of the regiment had long been a concern, but the change in regulations in 1786 allowed the Cambridgeshires to be commanded by a full colonel, and Hardwicke took advantage of this to supersede Ward. He appointed his nephew and heir, Philip Yorke, as colonel of the regiment on 31 January 1788. At the same time Capt Hale Wortham was promoted to Major after the resignation of Maj Stevenson, and Edward Nightingale (later Sir Edward Nightingale, 10th Baronet) was commissioned as a captain. Philip Yorke succeeded as 3rd Earl of Hardwicke and Lord Lieutenant of Cambridgeshire in 1790, and retained the colonelcy. Major Wortham and Capt Nightingale were promoted to lieutenant-colonel and major respectively on 15 March 1792 after the death of Lt-Col Ward.

=== French Revolutionary Wars ===
The militia was already being called out when Revolutionary France declared war on Britain on 1 February 1793. Hardwicke commissioned his younger brother Charles Philip Yorke into the regiment in 1793. As one of the MPs for Cambridgeshire, Charles Yorke felt that he should set an example to the county's gentry. With the outbreak of the French Revolutionary Wars he encouraged his brother the colonel to 'consider the business of the Regiment now as your principal and indeed sole occupation'. He frequently sought leave from his parliamentary duties to attend to the regiment. 'I did not come into this d–––d Regiment for amusement', he said, and promised to stay till the war ended 'if all the Devils in Hell were in it'.

The improvement in the regiment after Philip Yorke took over had gained praise when it went through its exercises in 1792, but when it was embodied soon afterwards the officers were described as inadequate and the sergeants able to do little by themselves: a bayonet charge ended in confusion, and drill was only possible in open order. Charles Yorke said that Lt-Col Wortham had 'infinite self-sufficiency' and 'not a single military idea in his head'. He made ' sad, sad work' at field days and disgraced the regiment in the sight of the officers of the Huntingdonshire Militia.

When it was embodied the regiment was so short of junior officers that Charles Yorke felt that they should ignore the property qualification (he wanted to promote the sergeant-major, a 'discreet, grave man', to quartermaster), and if possible get officers from the Army's Half-pay list. In this way the vacancies were quickly filled, but nine out of 16 subalterns had left by the spring of 1794. Several were imprisoned for debt, fraud, or sexual assault. Of pre-war officers, former Lt-Col Fell of the East Essex Militia, and Capt George Manby commissioned into the Cambridgeshires in 1788, proved physically unfit. Yorke's own company was in some disorder in the spring of 1793, one subaltern being sick, the other too diffident. In consequence the men ran up debts in the inns in which they were billeted.

The French Revolutionary Wars saw a new phase for the English militia: they were embodied for a whole generation, and became regiments of full-time professional soldiers (though restricted to service in the British Isles), which the regular army increasingly saw as a prime source of recruits. They served in coast defences, manning garrisons, guarding prisoners of war, and for internal security, while their traditional local defence duties were taken over by the Volunteers and mounted Yeomanry.

By 8 August 1793 the regiment, with 8 companies, was part of a militia concentration at Warley Camp. The Cambridgeshires were strictly disciplined and had to return to their tents in the early evening, while their neighbours the Huntingdonshires did not. This resentment led to a riot and a longstanding feud between the two regiments.

The argumentative Lt Tolver was made a financial offer to surrender the adjutancy, and Capt Charles Wale, a half-pay regular officer who had seen service at the Great Siege of Gibraltar, was appointed in his place on 4 December 1793.

During the winter of 1793–4 the regiment was scattered in detachments for winter quarters, which made training impossible, but in March 1794 it was possible to get six of the eighty companies together at St Ives and hold some field days. Wale considered the regiment still in poor shape when it arrived at Danbury Camp in Essex in the summer of 1794, but he divided it into two 'divisions', the proficient men drilling twice a day under Wale himself, the 'awkward' division three times a day under NCOs. He also introduced physical training for the men. His successes drew congratulations from the camp commander, Gen Johnston.

With a French invasion possible, the Government augmented the strength of the embodied militia in 1794, the men recruited by voluntary enlistment and paid for by county subscriptions. Cambridgeshire was assessed to raise an additional 50 men in this way. As adjutant, Charles Wale calculated that he could raise the men at a cost of 6 guineas (£6. 6s. 0d.) each, and the eventual cost was £7. Cambridgeshire also raised Troops of 'Fencible Cavalry' by the same means. Lieutenant-Col Wortham resigned in 1794 and Edward Nightingale and Charles Yorke were promoted to Lt-Col and Major respectively on 15 December.

The regiment spent the winter of 1794–5 at Landguard Fort and Harwich, where only occasional drill was possible. Captain Hudleston in temporary command had to deal with anonymous letters concerning the meat supply, which revealed chronic insubordination in the regiment; Hardwicke and Wale offered rewards to catch the offenders. The following summer the men camped on Landguard Common but could make use of the fort's canteen. Late in 1795 the regiment was ordered to take over Yarmouth Barracks from the Huntingdonshires, who had rioted and wrecked their quarters. Wale and Nightingale complained that their men would hold a grudge against the Huntingdonshire banditti. The Huntingdonshires claimed that their men had been corrupted by the South Lincolnshires. Later in the winter the Cambridgeshire and West Kent Militia shared Norwich Barracks, where training facilities were good. The militia were accused of a series of robberies in the city, but when the robbers were caught they turned out to be civilians. After their trial Lt-Col Nightingale and his opposite number of the West Kents took out newspaper advertisements declaring that the honour of their men had been vindicated. Nevertheless, desertion and drunkenness were problems. Wales thought it best to mount guard in the mornings instead of the evenings, to avoid having to punish men for being drunk on duty.

The regiment hired Johann Gottfried Lehmann from Hanover to be bandmaster in 1794. In 1796 he was in trouble for taking a private gig: he responded that he did not consider himself under military discipline. The regimental band had been in existence since at least 1781 when Hardwicke was asked for a donation. In 1796 it consisted of seven of the 18 regimental drummers and eight additional musicians ranked as drummers. In 1798 Lehmann and the band refused to play as a string ensemble for an officers' ball, claiming lack of instruments but in reality seeking a gratuity.

In the spring of 1797 the Cambridgeshires were stationed at the newly-constructed Prisoner-of-war camp at Norman Cross in Huntingdonshire, together with the badly-disciplined South Lincolnshire regiment. There was trouble between the regiments until a senior general was sent to take command, after which gthings improved, but the Cambridgeshires were still plagued by drunkenness. On 17 February 1797 it was announced that the militia were to be formed into brigades for their summer training. The Cambridgeshires, together with the East Norfolks, West Suffolks and Warwickshires, formed 2nd Brigade of Gen Sir William Howe's Division. At its 1798 camp the Cambridgeshires trained 50 selected men as marksmen, but afterwards it proved hard to find ranges for them to practice.

In a fresh attempt to have as many men as possible under arms for home defence in order to release regulars, the Government created the Supplementary Militia in 1796, a compulsory levy of men to be trained in their spare time, and to be incorporated in the Militia in emergency. Cambridge's additional quota was fixed at 646 men. The officer in charge of their training in 1797 was anxious that it should be done at a central rendezvous rather than their home districts, where they would be laughed at by the friends and officers issuing punishments would be in danger 'of being knocked on the head by old women and their families – I assure you I fear those viragos ... more that I do the invasion of the French'. Sending officers and NCOs back to their home counties to train the part-time supplementaries was a burden on the regular militia. There was a call-out of the Supplementary Militia in 1798 to replace militiamen who had volunteered to transfer to the Regular Army, and to augment the embodied militia. Charles Wale had by now left the regiment but returned on 25 April 1798 with the rank of major to command the Supplementary Militia of Cambridgeshire, with two other captains, indicating an augmentation of three companies.

Part of the reason for the augmentation was the outbreak of the Irish Rebellion of 1798, which drew away many of the regulars from mainland Britain. Legislation passed in March 1798 also allowed the militia to volunteer for service in Ireland. The Cambridgeshire Militia was one of 13 regiments that volunteered and served there in 1798–99 under Col Vaughan, while the last embers of the rebellion were put down. Charles Yorke succeeded Sir Edward Nightingale as the regiment's Lt-Col on 10 February 1799. Yorke's time with the regiment was limited after he joined the Government as Secretary at War from February 1801 to August 1803, and then Home Secretary until May 1804.

With negotiations under way for the Treaty of Amiens to end hostilities, the Cambridgeshire Militia were ordered to march from Ipswich to their own county in November 1801, where they were disembodied in 1802

=== Napoleonic Wars ===
The Peace of Amiens was shortlived and the militia were re-embodied in 1803, Colonel the Earl of Hardwicke's son Lord Royston became a captain in the regiment on 6 March, and Tanfield Vatchell (captain since 13 March 1797) became major on 5 July 1803.

Non-attendance at musters and desertion remained an issue:

CAMBRIDGESHIRE MILITIA. WHEREAS several of the men who were sworn and inrolled to serve in the said militia have neglected to APPEAR at ELY, on Friday the 25th instant (the day on which the said Militia was embodied): This is therefore to give Notice, That unless they immediately join the said Militia, they will be proceeded against as Deserters. By Order the Lieutenancy, JOHN INGLE, Clerk to the General Meetings. CAMBRIDGE, March 30th, 1803.

Even those who were paid to attend muster might desert

CAMBRIDGESHIRE MILITIA. DESERTED, May 2d 1803, WILLIAM BROWN, Substitute for Howard Dalby, for the Parish of Whittlesey. He is 26 years age, 5 feet 8 1/2 inches high', dark brown hair, grey eyes, (full eyed) rather pale complexion, born at Downham, Cambridgeshire and by calling a labourer. The above Deserter served last War in the Chatham Division of Marines was some time on Board, the Zealous Man of War, 74 guns, and lately worked with a Gang of Navigators. N. B. Deserted in his Regimentals. Whoever will apprehend the above Deserter, shall receive ONE GUINEA Reward, from Lieutenant-Colonel Yorke, (Commanding the above-named Regiment) over and above the usual allowance for apprehending Deserters.

A reward of 20 shillings each was offered for the three deserters from the Cambridgeshire Old Militia at Ipswich barracks and five from the Cambridgeshire Supplementary Militia at Ely in July 1803. In August the papers listed ten deserters.

After embodiment the Cambridgeshire Militia was stationed at Landguard Fort once more. 'On Friday 26 July 1803 the barracks of the garrison at Landguard Fort took fire, assisted by the Cambridgeshire Militia encamped nearby, it was extinguished in a very short time, without doing any material damage. Adjoining to the barracks was the magazine containing 300 barrels of powder, cartridges, and various kinds of combustible materials'.

In September 1803 the Cambridgeshire Militia were ordered to march from Landguard Fort to camp with the 1st and 2nd Royal Lancashire Militia at Danbury, Essex, until the barracks there could be completed. During the summer of 1805, when Napoleon was massing his 'Army of England' at Boulogne for a projected invasion, the regiment under Lt-Col Charles Yorke was stationed at Lympne Camp, with 472 men in 8 companies, forming part of Maj-Gen Sir John Moore's force. In late November 1805 the regiment passed through Maidstone in Kent and moved into barracks at Brabourne Lees for the winter. In 1806 Lt-Col Charles Yorke succeeded his brother as colonel of the regiment.

In 1807 the regiment was at Yarmouth, where Col Yorke and the officers entertained the officers of the City of Norwich Regiment of Volunteer Infantry when they arrived to do a period of permanent duty in the town. In December the Royal Navy Sloop-of-war HMS Alacrity landed some French prisoners of war at Yarmouth and they were escorted to prison by a party of the Cambridgeshire Militia. Again, in January 1808 the crews of two French luggers were landed at Hull by HMS Ariadne and escorted to prison by a detachment of the Cambridgeshire Militia. While the regiment was based in Yarmouth, the Barrack master was Capt George Manby formerly one of its officer in Cambs Militia. In March 1808 he investigated the circulation of forged banknotes in the town by members of the regiment, one of whom was convicted and sentenced to transportation. (Note: 'In the month of March last, Capt G. W. Manby, barrack master, of Yarmouth, in consequence of information he had received that a number of forged notes were in circulation in that town, and that the suspicion of uttering them had attached to; persons belonging to the Cambridgeshire militia who were quartered there, made an immediate application to the commanding officer of the regiment on the subject, by whose order a general muster was made of the different companies, including the cooks and the baggage as well as the persons. of the men, underwent a strict search by the officers of companies in the respective mess rooms. In the course of which the prisoner Hardy was observed by a sentry to the room where he was, and give a handkerchief tied in the shape of a handle to a woman, who went out with it. This the sentry reported to his officer, by whose order the woman delivered up a handkerchief bundle, which she swore in court to be the same that Hardy had given her to take care of; but she had not opened it, nor knew at the time what was in it. The handkerchief, however, was found to contain two £1 notes, purporting to be of the Bank of England, but proved on the oath of one of the Bank Inspectors of Notes to be both forged. Hardy in his defence said he had taken them of some smugglers, not knowing but that they were good notes. Hardy was sentenced to 14 years transportation'.)

In August 1808 the regiment was reported to have volunteered to serve in 'Spain or other parts of Europe', though nothing came of this at the time. In May 1809 the regiment moved from Yarmouth to Chelmsford. In 1810 the regiment was marched to Hampstead and Highgate, north of London, in case rioting broke out ion the city.

Yorke gave up the colonelcy in 1811 and was succeeded by Francis Pemberton, who retained the command until his death in 1849. His appointment meant the supersession of Tanfield Vachell (lt-col since 1808) who had always been his senior in the regiment, but Vachell remained his lt-col until 1850.

Increasingly the Regular Army regarded the militia as a source of trained men and many militiamen took the proffered bounty and transferred, leaving the militia regiments to replace them through the ballot or 'by beat of drum'. The Cambridgeshire Militia was stationed at Peebles in Scotland in early 1813, where its annual quota of volunteers were enlisted in various regiments but its recruiting parties were was also successful in bringing in men for the militia. (Note: 'The recruiting parties the Cambridgeshire militia have been very successful of late; 26 recruits marched on the 2d instant, for Peebles, the headquarters of the regiment, 16 on the 12th instant, and at this time there are 18 in the county, making in all 60; 30 of which have been enlisted since the 25th March. The annual quota of volunteers from the Cambridgeshire militia were attested at Peebles on the 2d Instant for the following regiments, viz. Third Foot Guards 9, 23rd Regiment of Foot, or Royal Welch Fusiliers 58, 103rd Regiment Foot, 2;— total 69. The whole were attested for limited service, except 13 of the Royal Welch Fusileers, who preferred unlimited service.)

==== Local Militia ====
While the Militia were the mainstay of national defence during the Revolutionary and Napoleonic Wars, they were supplemented from 1808 by the Local Militia, which were part-time and only to be used within their own districts. These were raised to counter the declining numbers of Volunteers, and if their ranks could not be filled voluntarily the Militia Ballot was employed. They would be trained once a year.

At the first annual training in 1809, disturbances in the Cambridgeshire Local Militia at Ely had to be put down by troops of the King's German Legion, and some militiamen were flogged, a procedure criticised by William Cobbett, resulting in his imprisonment for treasonous libel.

==== Ireland ====
The Interchange Act 1811 permitted English militia regiments to serve in Ireland once again, for a period of up to two years. The Cambridgeshire militia marched from Peebles in three 'divisions' on 22, 23 and 26 April 1813 to Portpatrick to embark for Ireland. The regiment landed at Donaghadee on 4, 5 and 6 May and marched to Belfast, from where two companies were detached to Antrim, two to Downpatrick, and two to Carrickfergus. In December 1813 the regiment was stationed at Lifford in County Donegal.

==== Bordeaux ====
From November 1813 the militia were invited to volunteer for limited overseas service, primarily for garrison duties in Europe. Five officers and 160 other ranks of the Cambridgeshires at Lifford (out of a reported 12 officers and 400 or more other ranks who had volunteered) were posted to the 1st Provisional Battalion. This went to Portsmouth where the Militia Brigade was assembling. The brigade embarked on 10–11 March 1814 and joined the Earl of Dalhousie's division that had occupied Bordeaux just as the war was ending. The brigade did not form part of the Army of Occupation after the abdication of Napoleon and returned to England in June.

=== Littleport Riots ===
There was another long peace after the Battle of Waterloo and the militia were quickly disembodied. The Cambridgeshire Militia marched back to Ely for this to be carried out in January 1816. Each regiment maintained a small permanent staff of sergeants and drummers under the adjutant, and these were sometimes called upon in support the civil authorities. Within months of the regiment being disembodied, the permanent staff were engaged in putting down the Ely and Littleport riots:

Our alarm has considerably subsided, from intelligence just brought in from Ely, stating, that the main body of the insurgents were attacked on Friday morning (after the Riot Act had been read without effect), and completely touted. Sir Henry 15. Dudley and the Rev. 11. Law. two Magistrates of the isle, "arriving with Captain Wortham's Troop of Yeomanry early on Friday morning, and learning that the rioters had determined to set fire to Littleport that night, and the town Ely on the night following, called out the small detachment of the 1st Dragoons consisting of 18 men, commanded by Capt. Methuen, and sending 24 of the disbanded Militia, who were armed from the country depot by Lieut. Woolert, pushed on to Littleport, where, taking the insurgents by surprise, their defeat was speedy and complete. The savage rioters soon began to fire upon the Magistrates and the troops, from barricaded houses near the river, when the latter were ordered to fire into them. The conflict, though short, was sharp. The insurgents soon began to fly from every part of the town over the Fens, and were pursued in every direction: only two of the rioters were killed (one of them a Chief), and a few wounded – 104 were taken prisoners, and more are hourly bringing; fortunately the soldiers had only two or three slightly wounded.

A number of those involved in the riots were later hanged.

Although officers continued to be commissioned into the militia and ballots were still held during the long peace after the Battle of Waterloo, the regiments were rarely assembled for training and the permanent staffs of sergeants and drummers were progressively reduced. The ballot was suspended by the Militia Act 1829. However, the militia were called out for training in 1833:

Militia Review.— The 68th Cambs. Regiment of Militia were inspected by Col. Knox, of the Coldstream Guards, on Monday (yesterday), and were highly complimented for the efficiency they had attained in their drill. The weather was very uupropitious, rain descending during the whole of the inspection.

== 1852 reforms ==
The Militia of the United Kingdom was revived by the Militia Act 1852, enacted during a renewed period of international tension. As before, units were raised and administered on a county basis, and filled by voluntary enlistment (although conscription by means of the Militia Ballot might be used if the counties failed to meet their quotas). Training was for 56 days on enlistment, then for 21–28 days per year, during which the men received full army pay. Under the act, Militia units could be embodied by royal proclamation for full-time home defence service in three circumstances:

1. 'Whenever a state of war exists between Her Majesty and any foreign power'.
2. 'In all cases of invasion or upon imminent danger thereof'.
3. 'In all cases of rebellion or insurrection'.

The recruits to the newly reformed Cambridgeshire Militia were not held in the highest regard: one newspaper likened them to Falstaff's recruits in Shakespeare's Henry IV, Part 2. (Note: The Militia.—It has often been observed that the best soldiers are moulded from the roughest materials; assuming this the case, our Cambridgeshire Militia will do honor to the country. On Wednesday last, several hundreds of embryo heroes underwent the necessary examination at the Town Hall, the place being thronged with them throughout the day, and the effluvium left by them still hangs round the ancient edifice, and well might we exclaim You may mop, you may deluge, the Hall if you will, but the scent of Militia boys will stick to it still. On seeing the crowd, and scanning their qualifications, we were forcibly reminded of Falstaff and the Justices, in Henry IV., when the men of Sir John were being examined; for surely, on Wednsday, there were the Mouldys, the Shadows, the Warts, the Feebles, and the Bullcalfs, multiplied by twenties; and if the Colonel of the Cambridgeshire Militia were present, he might have exclaimed with Falstaff 'Care I for the limb, the stature, bulk, and big assemblance of a man! Give the spirit; master Shallow.—Here's a Wart; you sec what ragged appearanco it is: he shall charge you, and discharge you, with the motion of a pewterer's hammer; come off, and on; and swifter than he that gibbets on the brewer's bucket. And this same half-faced fellow. Shadow, — give me the man; he presents no mark to the enemy; the foeman may with as great aim level at the edge a penknife; and, for a retreat, how swiftly will this Feeble, the woman's tailor, run off! Oh, give me the spare men — and spare the great ones'. Unfortunately, two of the militia men are now in prison for delinquencies, and their time with Mr. Edia does not expire till after the time fixed for the exercises to come off at Ely has expired. "We hope, that this will not be looked upon as a national calamity however, they will both be prepared to do their duty with their brave companions in arms, at the promised invasion.)

=== Crimean War ===
The regiment was embodied on 22 August 1854 for service during the Crimean War and sent to do duty in Ireland. Before it left, Elizabeth Yorke, Countess of Hardwicke presented new Regimental colours to the Cambridgeshire Militia at Ely Cathedral in September. The regimental headquarters was in Dublin, but recruiting continued in Cambridge:

Cambridgeshire Militia.— The red-coats are again scattered about the city; and we are informed that about 100 recruits have been added to this regiment, and they expect an order daily for Dublin. Report states that about the same number of this corps, now doing garrison duty at the Royal Barracks, Dublin, have volunteered into regiments of the line about to embark for the Crimea. All honour and success to the 68th Cambridgeshire Militia.— Cambridge Chronicle.

The regiment was disembodied in 1856 after the war was ended by the Treaty of Paris, and returned to the routine of annual training.

The regiment built a permanent barracks in Silver Street in Ely at this time. Some of the buildings still exist in other uses, and in local names, such as 'Militia Way', 'Range Road', and 'Militia House'.

The Militia Reserve introduced in 1867 consisted of present and former militiamen who undertook to serve overseas in case of war.

== Cardwell and Childers reforms ==
Under the 'Localisation of the Forces' scheme introduced by the Cardwell Reforms of 1872, militia regiments were brigaded with their local Regular and Volunteer battalions. Sub-District No 32 (Suffolk & Cambridge) set up its depot at the County Buildings in Bury St Edmunds, headquarters of the West Suffolk Militia. It comprised:

- 1st and 2nd Battalions, 12th (East Suffolk) Regiment of Foot
- West Suffolk Militia
- Cambridgeshire Militia at Ely
- 1st Administrative Battalion, Suffolk Rifle Volunteer Corps at Sudbury
- 2nd Administrative Battalion, Suffolk Rifle Volunteer Corps at Woodbridge
- 3rd Administrative Battalion, Suffolk Rifle Volunteer Corps at Lowestoft
- 1st Administrative Battalion, Cambridgeshire Rifle Volunteer Corps at Cambridge
- 3rd (Cambridge University) Cambridgeshire Rifle Volunteer Corps at Cambridge

The militia now came under the War Office rather than their county lords lieutenant. Around a third of the recruits and many young officers went on to join the regular army.

Following the Cardwell Reforms a mobilisation scheme began to appear in the Army List from December 1875. This assigned Regular and Militia units to places in an order of battle of corps, divisions and brigades for the 'Active Army', even though these formations were entirely theoretical, with no staff or services assigned. The Cambridgeshire Militia were assigned to 2nd Brigade of 3rd Division, VII Corps. The brigade would have mustered at Newcastle upon Tyne in time of war.

In 1878 the Militia Reserve was called out because of international tensions over the Russo-Turkish War, and 144 men did duty that summer with the 2nd Battalion, Suffolk Regiment at Gosport. In July that year the West Suffolk and Cambridgeshire Militia were brigaded with the 2nd Battalion when it was inspected on Southsea Common by the Commander-in-Chief, the Duke of Cambridge.

=== 4th (Cambridge Militia) Battalion, Suffolk Regiment ===
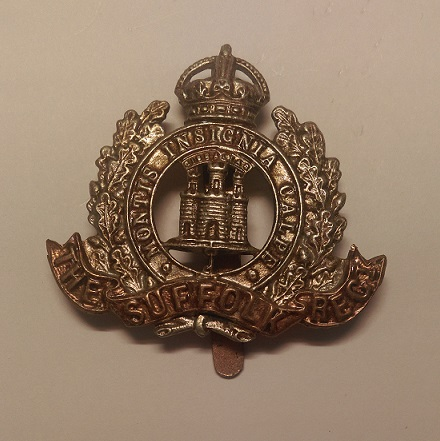
Cap badge of the Suffolk Regiment.

The Childers Reforms of 1881 completed the Cardwell process by converting the linked regular regiments into county regiments and incorporating the militia battalions into them. The Cambridgeshire and Suffolk Militia became:

- 3rd (West Suffolk Militia) Battalion, Suffolk Regiment
- 4th (Cambridge Militia) Battalion, Suffolk Regiment

At the start of the Second Boer War 1899, most regular army battalions were sent to South Africa, the Militia Reserve was mobilised to reinforce them, and many militia units were called out to replace them for home defence. The 4th Battalion was embodied from 23 January to 15 October 1900.

After the Boer War, there were moves to reform the Auxiliary Forces (militia, yeomanry and volunteers) to take their place in the six army corps proposed by St John Brodrick as Secretary of State for War. However, little of Brodrick's scheme was carried out. However, under the sweeping Haldane Reforms of 1908, the militia was replaced by the Special Reserve (SR), a semi-professional force similar to the previous militia reserve, whose role was to provide reinforcement drafts for regular units serving overseas in wartime. Simultaneously the volunteers and yeomanry became the Territorial Force (TF). The two Suffolk Regiment battalions were combined into the 3rd (Reserve) Battalion and the 4th (Cambridgeshire Militia) Battalion was disbanded on 15 July 1908.

== Commanding Officers ==
The following officers commanded the regiment:

- Lt-Col Cmdt Thomas Bromley, 2nd Baron Montfort, 1759–78
- Lt-Col Cmdt Thomas Watson Ward, 1778–88 (remained Lt-Col until 1792)
- Col Philip Yorke, 3rd Earl of Hardwicke, 1788–1806
- Col Charles Philip Yorke, 1806–11
- Col Francis Pemberton, 1811–49
- Col the Hon Octavius Duncombe MP, former lieutenant, 1st Life Guards, appointed 2 August 1852
- R.G. Wale, formerly 33rd Foot, Lt-Col from 31 August 1854; granted honorary rank of colonel 1871 and appointed Honorary Colonel of the Regiment 19 September 1883
- Lt-Col (Hon Col) Lancelot Reed, promoted 1 September 1883
- Lt-Col (Hon Col) Harry Purkis
- Lt-Col (Hon Col) Herbert Fryer, promoted 13 July 1898
- Lt-Col (Hon Col) Robert Bacchus, promoted 13 August 1904

=== Honorary Colonels ===
The following served as Honorary Colonel of the Regiment:

- Col R.G. Wale, appointed 19 September 1883
- Field Marshal HRH Prince George, Duke of Cambridge, Commander-in-Chief of the Forces, appointed 30 July 1892
- Walter Duncombe, son of Col Octavius Duncombe (above), former Capt, 1st Life Guards, appointed 11 August 1906

=== Other prominent members ===
- On 21 April 1788 George Manby obtained a commission as a Lieutenant in the Cambridgeshire Militia, later achieving the rank of captain. He left the regiment in Spring 1793.
- General Sir Charles Wale, adjutant and later major, Cambridgeshire Militia, 1793–99 while on half-pay from the Regular Army. Returned to full pay in the regulars and served in India and the West Indies.
- Philip Yorke, Viscount Royston, became a captain in the regiment on 6 March 1803, died 1806.
- Tanfield Vachell, major 1803, lt-col 1808
- Francis Osborne, 1st Baron Godolphin, appointed captain 15 January 1831
- The Hon Eliot Constantine Yorke, MP, appointed lieutenant 23 March 1866, and later promoted to captain
- The Hon Alexander Grantham Yorke (brother of above), appointed captain 22 January 1879
- Sir Richard C. Gethin, 7th Baronet, appointed captain 9 April 1886, later hon major and instructor of musketry

== Heritage and ceremonial ==
=== Uniforms and insignia ===
The company colours of the Cambridge Trained Bands ca 1644 were yellow with red cross-crosslets denoting the captains' seniority. The Cambridgeshires were one of four militia regiments granted the Irish Harp as an emblem on their colours for their distinguished service in Ireland in 1798–9.

The Cambridgeshire Militia wore a red uniform with green facings in 1760, but the facings had changed to yellow by 1800. In 1833 the officers' Shako plate displayed a castle resting on a scroll inscribed 'Cambridgeshire' with the number 68 below, the whole superimposed on a star surmounted by a crown. Before joining the Suffolk Regiment in 1881 the buttons carried a similar design and trghe castle was retained on the helmet plate 1878–81. About 1812 the shoulder-belt plate was embossed with the letters 'C.M.' surmounted by a crown. The officers' waist-belt plate of 1855–81 had the Royal cypher and crown within a circle inscribed with the regimental title.

When the militia adopted the Suffolks' uniform in 1881, a brass 'M" was worn on the shoulder strap, with the battalion numeral added above it in 1887. From 1889 the 3rd and 4th Militia Bns adopted the Suffolk Regiment's custom of wearing roses on their caps, colours and drums on Minden Day and the Sovereign's birthday. The Suffolk Regiment was allocated white facings in 1881, but regained their traditional yellow facings in 1900, and the militia battalions conformed.

=== Precedence ===
Until the War of American Independence the precedence of militia regiments on service was determined by the date of their arrival in camp and later by drawing lots where regiments. From 1778 the counties were given an order of precedence determined by ballot each year. For the Cambridgeshire Militia the positions were:

- 31st on 1 June 1778
- 27th on12 May 1779
- 44th on 6 May 1780
- 34th on 28 April 1781
- 25th on 7 May 1782

The militia order of precedence balloted for in 1793 (Cambridgeshire was 11th) remained in force throughout the French Revolutionary War. Another ballot for precedence took place in 1803 at the start of the Napoleonic War and remained in force until 1833: Cambridgeshire was 24th. In 1833 the King drew the lots for individual regiments and the resulting list continued in force with minor amendments until the end of the militia. The regiments raised before the peace of 1763 took the first 47 places, but because it was not actually embodied until 1778 the Cambridgeshire regiment was counted in the second group and ranked 68th. Most regiments took little notice of the numeral, but the Cambridgeshires wore theirs on their shako.
