= Philip Yorke, Viscount Royston =

Philip Yorke, Viscount Royston (7 May 1784 – 7 April 1808), was a British traveller and politician.

Yorke was the eldest son of Philip Yorke, 3rd Earl of Hardwicke and Lady Elizabeth, daughter of James Lindsay, 5th Earl of Balcarres. He was the grandson of Charles Yorke and the nephew of Charles Philip Yorke and Sir Joseph Sydney Yorke. He was educated at Harrow School and St John's College, Cambridge, where he graduated as Master of Arts in 1803. At Cambridge he wrote a translation of Lycophron's poem about Cassandra that was praised highly by Richard Porson. He was commissioned as a captain in the Cambridgeshire Militia (commanded by his father and uncle) on 6 March 1803 when the militia were being embodied on the breakdown of the Peace of Amiens.

In 1806 he embarked on a tour of the Russian Empire which he described in detail in letters to his father that were published in The remains of the late Lord Viscount Royston: With a memoir of his life by the Rev. Henry Pepys (London: J. Murray, 1838); they were used by Lydia Davis for her story "Lord Royston's Tour."

He was returned to parliament for Reigate in 1806, a seat he held until April 1808, when he was lost in a storm off Memel in a ship called the Agatha of Lübeck.

Yorke died aged only 23, predeceasing his father. He never married. His younger brother Charles also died before his father and their cousin Charles Yorke eventually succeeded in the earldom. His translation of Lycophron was published posthumously.

Parliament of the United Kingdom
Preceded by Sir Joseph Sydney Yorke; Philip James Cocks	Member of Parliament for Reigate; 1806–1808; With: Hon. Edward Charles Cocks	Succeeded by Hon. Edward Charles Cocks; James Cocks
