= Joseph Yorke =

Joseph Yorke may refer to:

- Joseph Yorke, 1st Baron Dover (1724–1792), British soldier, politician and diplomat
- Joseph Sydney Yorke (1768–1831), British naval commander, nephew of the above
- Joseph Yorke (MP) (1807–1889), British landowner and politician, kinsman of the above
- Joseph Yorke, 10th Earl of Hardwicke (born 1971), British peer
