= Alexander Lindsay, 4th Earl of Balcarres =

Scottish peer

Alexander Lindsay
- 4th Earl of Balcarres
- Predecessor: Colin Lindsay
- Successor: James Lindsay
- Died: July 25, 1736
- Noble family: Lindsay
- Spouse: Elizabeth Scott
- Father: Colin Lindsay, 3rd Earl of Balcarres
- Mother: Lady Margaret Campbell
- Occupation: Peer, Army officer

Alexander Lindsay, 4th Earl of Balcarres (died 25 July 1736) was a Scottish peer.

Alexander Lindsay was born the son of Colin Lindsay, 3rd Earl of Balcarres and Lady Margaret Campbell. He inherited his title on the death of his father in 1722. He married in 1718 Elizabeth Scott, the daughter of David Scott of Scotstarvet.

He joined the army as an ensign then lieutenant in the grenadier horse guards. He then transferred, as a captain, to Lord Orkney's regiment and saw much action in Flander, where he was wounded at the siege of St Venant. He was in Ireland with his regiment at the time his father and brother took part in the Jacobite rising of 1715, which caused him to lose any chance of promotion in the army. He thus returned home to a commission in the foot guards.

At the general election in 1734, he was returned as one of the sixteen representative peers of Scotland.

He died on 25 July 1736. As he had no children, he was succeeded by his brother James Lindsay, 5th Earl of Balcarres.

Peerage of Scotland
Preceded by Colin Lindsay	Earl of Balcarres; 1722–1736	Succeeded by James Lindsay
