= John Yorke, 7th Earl of Hardwicke =

Captain John Manners Yorke, 7th Earl of Hardwicke DL, JP (30 October 1840 – 13 March 1909), styled The Honourable John Yorke until 1904, was a British naval commander and peer.

Yorke was the second son of Admiral Charles Yorke, 4th Earl of Hardwicke, by the Honourable Susan, daughter of Thomas Liddell, 1st Baron Ravensworth. Charles Yorke, 5th Earl of Hardwicke, and Elliot Yorke were his brothers and Albert Yorke, 6th Earl of Hardwicke his nephew. Like his father he served in the Royal Navy and gained the rank of Captain in 1854. From 1870 to 1874 he was Inspector of the Coastguard at Folkestone in Kent. He was also a Deputy Lieutenant and Justice of the Peace for Cambridgeshire. In 1904, aged 64, he succeeded in the earldom of Hardwicke on the early death of his nephew, Albert.

Lord Hardwicke married Edith Mary, daughter of Alexander Haldane Oswald, in 1869. They had four sons and a daughter. He died in March 1909, aged 68, and was succeeded by his eldest son, Charles. The Countess of Hardwicke died in July 1930.

Peerage of Great Britain
Preceded by Albert Yorke	Earl of Hardwicke; 1904–1909	Succeeded by Charles Alexander Yorke
