= Colin Lindsay, 3rd Earl of Balcarres =

Scottish Jacobite politician

Colin Lindsay
- 3rd Earl of Balcarres
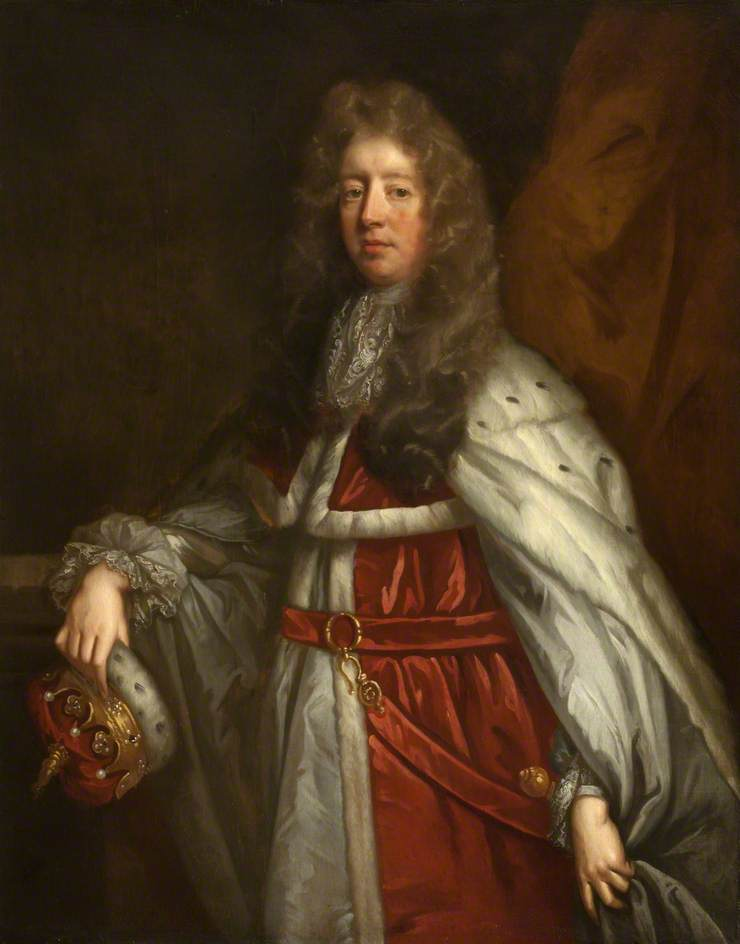
- A portrait of Lord Balcarres by John Riley
- Born: 1652
- Died: 1722 (aged 69–70)
- Spouses: Mademoiselle Mauritiade Nassau; Lady Jean Carnegie; Lady Jean Ker; Lady Margaret Campbell
- Father: Alexander Lindsay
- Mother: Lady Anna Mackenzie

Colin Lindsay, 3rd Earl of Balcarres (1652–1722) was a Scottish aristocrat and politician, and one of the most important supporters of James II in Scotland.

== Biography ==
=== Early life ===
Colin Lindsay was baptized at Kilconquhar on 23 August 1652, the second surviving son of Alexander Lindsay, first Earl of Balcarres by his wife, Lady Anna Mackenzie, daughter and coheiress of Colin Mackenzie, 1st Earl of Seaforth.

He succeeded to the earldom, while still a child, on the death at the age of twelve, of his brother Charles, second earl, 15 Oct. 1662. In 1670 at the age of sixteen, he was presented at court by his cousin the Duke of Lauderdale, when Charles II, partly because he conceived a liking for him personally, and partly in recognition of his father's services, gave him command of a select cavalry troop manned by gentlemen in reduced circumstances. Not long afterwards he was married to Mademoiselle Mauritiade Nassau, sister of Lady Arlington and the Countess of Nassau, and daughter of Louis de Nassau, count of Beverwaert and Auverquerque in the Dutch Republic; but at the ceremony he reportedly placed a mourning instead of a wedding ring on the finger of the bride. She is said to have taken the evil omen to heart and she died within a year. After her death he went to sea with the Duke of York (the future James II of England), under whom he distinguished himself at the battle of Solebay, 28 May 1672.

=== Second marriage and public offices ===
In 1673 he married Lady Jean Carnegie, eldest daughter of David Carnegie, 2nd Earl of Northesk, and thereby incurring the king's displeasure, was forbidden to appear at court. Retiring to the country he occupied his leisure in study. On the death of his wife, six years afterwards, he was permitted to return to court, and on 3 June 1680 was made a privy-councillor and in 1682 sheriff of Fife. Along with Claverhouse he took active measures against the covenanters in Fife, and in January 1686 obtained a commission to hold with him a justiciary court for their trial.

=== Reign of James II and after ===
After the accession of James II Balcarres was, on 3 September 1686, appointed a commissioner of the treasury, and in 1688 was made Lord Lieutenant of Fife. So much was he trusted by the king, that when the scheme for the descent of the Prince of Orange became known, the chancellor, Lord Perth, was ordered to rely on his advice and that of the Earl of Cromarty in the measures to be adopted for the defence of Scotland. Lord Melfort, secretary of state, however, who was jealous of Balcarres's influence, rejected his suggested plan of defence as too expensive, and it was determined instead to send the forces then available in Scotland southwards. Balcarres, meanwhile, was sent by the Scottish privy council to England to receive further instructions, and succeeded in reaching London.

After the king's return from Faversham, Balcarres, along with Dundee, waited on him on the morning of 17 November in his bedroom at Whitehall. At the request of the king they accompanied him on a walk in the Mall, when, having expressed his final determination to leave the country, he stated that on his arrival in France he would send Balcarres a commission to manage his civil affairs, and Dundee one to command the troops in Scotland.

After the flight of the king Balcarres waited on the Prince of Orange, to whom he was previously known through his first wife, the prince's cousin. While expressing his respect for the prince, Balcarres declined to act against the king, whereupon the prince warned him of the danger he ran if he transgressed the law. Along with Dundee, Balcarres was permitted to return to Scotland, and they arrived in Edinburgh about the end of February 1689.

The Duke of Gordon was already negotiating the surrender of the castle, when Balcarres and Dundee waited on him, and persuaded him to hold out till he saw what the Convention of Estates intended to do. On the capture of a messenger from Ireland with letters to Balcarres from the king, Balcarres was seized and confined in his own lodging. His request for permission to live in England was refused, and on account of further compromising letters sent to him by Melfort, he was confined for four months in the common jail of Edinburgh. Soon after his release he became connected with the Montgomery plot for James's restoration, and on its discovery in 1690 he left the country.

=== In exile ===
He landed at Hamburg, and while journeying to the Dutch Republic, through Flanders, was seized by a party of banditti, who, however, agreed to free him on payment of a hundred pistoles, which he succeeded in obtaining from the jesuits at the Catholic college of Douay. He proceeded to St. Germains, where he was well received by James, to whom he presented his Memoirs touching the Revolution. On account of the misrepresentations of Melfort and others, he, however, found it necessary, after six months at St. Germains, to leave the court, and went to the south of France. Thence he sent an expostulatory letter to James. Ultimately the exiled king invited him to return; but he deemed acceptance of the invitation injudicious while the old favourites were in power, and after a year's sojourn in France finally settled with his family at Utrecht. Here he made the acquaintance of Pierre Bayle, Leclerc, and other learned men.

=== Return to Scotland ===
Ultimately, through the interposition of William Carstares and the Duke of Queensberry, who wrote of him pityingly, as an 'instance of the folly of Jacobitism', he was permitted towards the close of 1700 to return to Scotland. He was now in greatly impoverished circumstances, and although the Duke of Marlborough, an old friend and companion, obtained for him a rent-charge of £500 a year for ten years upon the crown lands of Orkney, he was compelled by his necessities, before the ten years expired, to sell his rights there. In his extremity he wrote to Queen Anne, asking for the restoration of his pension of £1000 a year, of which he had been deprived at the revolution, and in all probability some allowance was made him.

He was appointed a privy councillor in April 1706, and supported the union with England in 1707. But in 1715 he was unable to resist the invitation to join the Jacobite prince's standard, and he was one of the most zealous of his supporters. On the collapse of the rebellion, it was arranged, owing to the friendly interposition of Argyll and Marlborough, that on his surrendering he should be sent to his own house at Balcarres. He remained a prisoner there under the charge of one dragoon till the indemnity.

He spent the remainder of his life in retirement there, finding a solace for his misfortunes in his love of art and letters. He had latterly so recovered his pecuniary position as to be able to purchase several good pictures by the Dutch masters and others, to add considerably to his library, and also to found the village which he named after himself Colinsburgh. He died at Balcarres in 1722, and was buried there in the private chapel of the family.

== Character ==
John Macky describes him in 1700 as 'a gentleman of very good natural parts,' with 'abundance of application, handsome in his person, very fair, and towards fifty years old.' Circumstances were adverse to the useful employment of his undoubted abilities, but had the folly and infatuation of James II been less, he might have been successful with Dundee in retrieving the Jacobite cause. His 'Memoirs touching the Revolution in Scotland,' published originally in 1714, reprinted 1754, and again, more correctly by the Bannatyne Club, in 1841, are invaluable as a narrative of the proceedings and negotiations of the supporters of the king in 1688–90.

== Issue and succession ==
By his second wife, Lady Jean Carnegie, Balcarres had a daughter Anne, married to Alexander, Earl of Kellie, and afterwards to James Seton, 3rd Viscount of Kingston.

By his third wife, Lady Jean Ker, only daughter of The Earl of Roxburghe, he had a son Colin, Lord Cumberland, master of Balcarres, who died unmarried in 1708, and a daughter Margaret, who married John, Earl of Wigton.

By his fourth wife, Lady Margaret, eldest daughter of James Campbell, 2nd Earl of Loudoun, he had seven children, of whom four survived him - two sons, Alexander, and James, and two daughters, Eleanor, married to the Hon. James Fraser of Lonmay, Aberdeenshire, third son of William Fraser, 12th Lord Saltoun, and Elizabeth, who died unmarried.

== Works ==
- An account of the affairs of Scotland, relating to the revolution of 1688, 1714. Reprinted 1754. Republished 1841 as Memoirs touching the revolution in Scotland, Bannatyne Club

Peerage of Scotland
Preceded by Charles Lindsay	Earl of Balcarres; 1662–1722	Succeeded by Alexander Lindsay

== Notes ==
Attribution

This article incorporates text from a publication now in the public domain: Henderson, Thomas Finlayson (1893). "Lindsay, Colin". In Lee, Sidney (ed.). Dictionary of National Biography. Vol. 33. London: Smith, Elder & Co. pp. 286–288.
