= Elizabeth Yorke, Countess of Hardwicke =

Playwright

Elizabeth Yorke
- Countess of Hardwicke
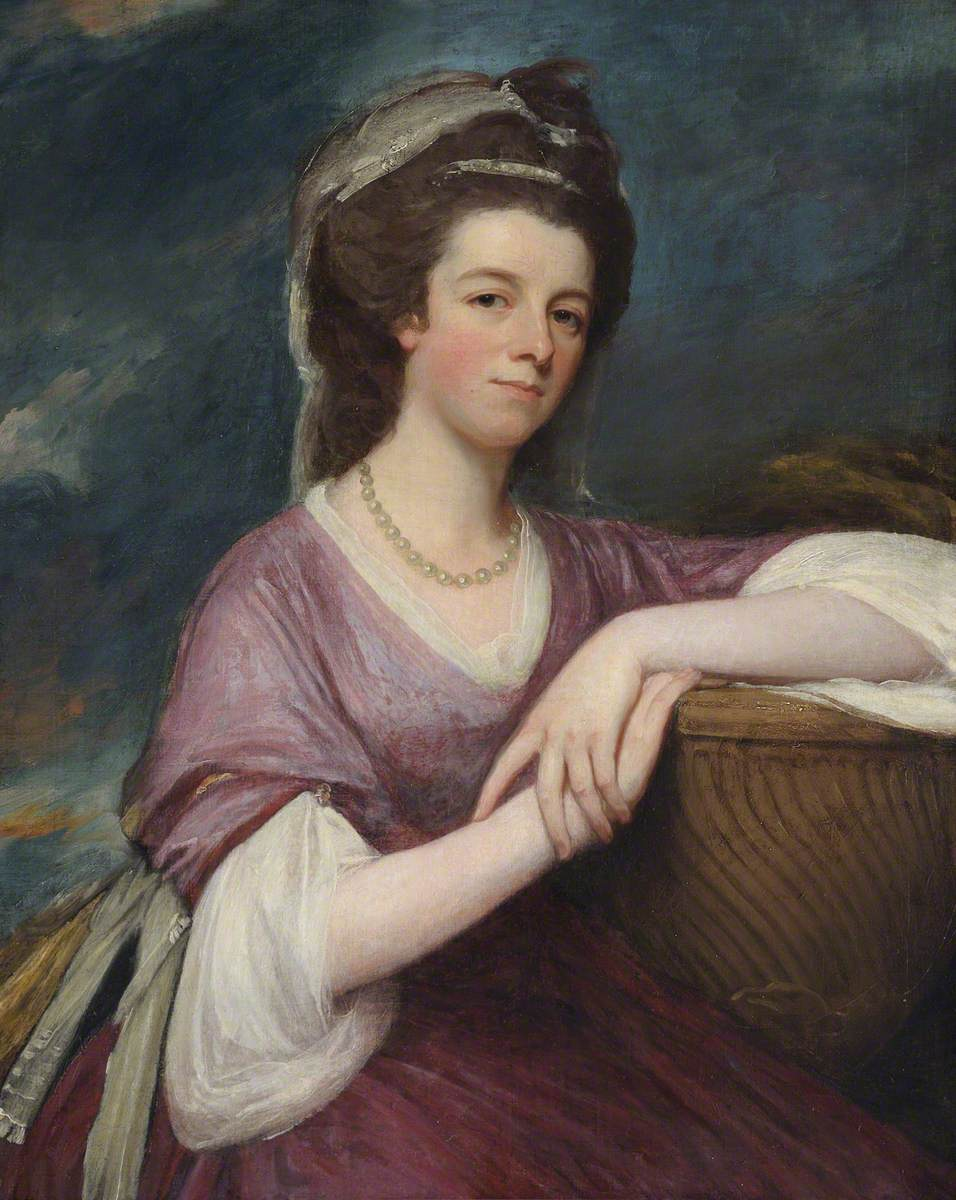
- Born: Lady Elizabeth Scot Lindsay; 1 October 1763; Balcarres House, Fife, Scotland
- Died: 26 May 1858 (aged 94); Tyttenhanger House, Hertfordshire
- Spouse: Philip Yorke, 3rd Earl of Hardwicke
- Issue: Philip Yorke, Viscount Royston
- Father: James Lindsay, 5th Earl of Balcarres
- Mother: Anne Dalrymple

Elizabeth Scot Yorke, Countess of Hardwicke (née Lindsay; 1 October 1763 – 26 May 1858) was a British playwright and member of the aristocracy.

== Early life and education ==
Born to James Lindsay, 5th Earl of Balcarres and Anne Dalrymple, Hardwicke married Philip Yorke, 3rd Earl of Hardwicke, on 24 July 1782. She became Countess of Hardwicke in 1796 when her husband succeeded his uncle. The couple had eight children, four boys and four girls. All four boys died young. Hardwicke regularly wrote and produced plays and performances in Wimpole Hall, but she was very conservative in her views and saw this less as a profession of writing than an example of her duty as a mother and charitable lady. In 1831 she was involved in the Irish Distress Committee raising money to relieve the suffering of poor Irish people. With the permission of Queen Victoria, she published The Court of Oberon, which she had written in the 1790s. She also provided the illustrations for the book.

She died at age 94 at Tyttenhanger House. She is buried in Chicheley Chapel in Wimpole, commemorated on the monument she had erected to the memory of her husband and sons.

== Bibliography ==
- The Court of Oberon, or The Three Wishes. A Drama in Three Acts (1831)
