= Albert Yorke, 6th Earl of Hardwicke =

British diplomat and Conservative politician (1867–1904)

The Right Honourable The Earl of Hardwicke DL
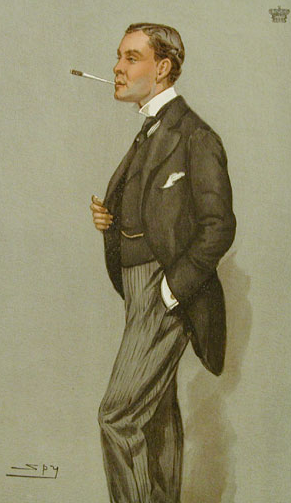
- Lord Hardwicke, by Leslie Ward, 1901

Under-Secretary of State for India
- In office 17 January 1900 – 8 August 1902
- Monarchs: Queen Victoria; Edward VII
- Prime Minister: The Marquess of Salisbury; Arthur Balfour
- Preceded by: The Earl of Onslow
- Succeeded by: The Earl Percy

Under-Secretary of State for War
- In office 8 August 1902 – 12 October 1903
- Monarch: Edward VII
- Prime Minister: Arthur Balfour
- Preceded by: The Lord Raglan
- Succeeded by: The Earl of Donoughmore

Personal details
- Born: 14 March 1867 Paris, France
- Died: 29 November 1904 (aged 37) Regent's Park, London
- Party: Conservative

Albert Edward Philip Henry Yorke, 6th Earl of Hardwicke, DL (14 March 1867 – 29 November 1904), styled Viscount Royston between 1873 and 1897, was a British diplomat and Conservative politician. His promising career was cut short by his sudden death at aged 37.

== Background ==
Hardwicke was born in 1867 at the British Embassy in Paris, the only son of Viscount Royston (who succeeded as Earl of Hardwicke in 1873), and Lady Sophia Georgiana Robertina, daughter of Henry Wellesley, 1st Earl Cowley. King Edward VII was one of his godfathers.

== Diplomatic and political career ==
Hardwicke was an Honorary Attaché in Vienna between 1886 and 1891. He entered the House of Lords on the death of his father in 1897 and made his maiden speech in February 1898. He served under Lord Salisbury and Arthur Balfour as Under-Secretary of State for India between 1901 and 1902 and again from 1903 until his death, and under Balfour as Under-Secretary of State for War between August 1902 and 1903. He made his last speech in the House of Lords in August 1904, three months before his death. Apart from his career in national politics he was a member of the London County Council between 1897 and 1901 and a deputy lieutenant of Cambridgeshire.

== Personal life ==
Lord Hardwicke died suddenly of syncope in 1904 at his home, 8 York Terrace, in Regent's Park. He had been in "delicate" health for some time but his death was unexpected. Aged only 37 and unmarried, he was succeeded in the earldom by his uncle John Manners Yorke.

Political offices
Preceded by The Earl of Onslow	Under-Secretary of State for India; 1900–1902	Succeeded by Earl Percy
Preceded by The Lord Raglan	Under-Secretary of State for War; 1902–1903	Succeeded by The Earl of Donoughmore
Peerage of Great Britain
Preceded by Charles Philip Yorke	Earl of Hardwicke; 1897–1904	Succeeded by John Manners Yorke
