= Charles Blount (deist) =

English deist and philosopher (1654–1693)

Charles Blount (27 April 1654 – August 1693) was an English deist and philosopher who published several anonymous essays critical of the existing English order.

== Life ==
Blount was born in Upper Holloway, Islington, Middlesex, the fourth son of Sir Henry Blount. His father educated him at home and exposed him to freethinking philosophy. In 1672 Charles inherited lands in Islington and the estate of Blount's Hall in Staffordshire. He married Eleanor Tyrrell in Westminster Abbey at the end of 1672; they had three sons and a daughter. Throughout his life he remained at Blount's Hall as a leisured gentleman, although he also travelled to London to participate in courtly life.

Blount's publications were consistently anonymous or written under a pseudonym, and with a radical or Whig slant. In 1673 he wrote Mr Dreyden Vindicated, defending John Dryden's The Conquest of Granada from Richard Leigh's attacks. In 1673 he also penned the anonymous The Friendly Vindication.

In 1678 Blount became a member of the Green Ribbon Club, a group of radical Whig advocates and activists. In 1679 he published An Appeal from the Country to the City under the name of "Junius Brutus". It was a strongly Whig piece that suggested that the Popish Plot was entirely real. It painted a lurid picture of what life in London would be like under James II and Roman Catholicism. In this case, the printer was seized and fined, and the pamphlet was burned by the common hangman (i.e. a symbolic execution of the book for treason). The same year, he assumed the name of Philopatris ("lover of his country") to write A Just Vindication of Learning, which was an argument against the act licensing printers. He mimicked John Milton's previous Areopagitica. After the death of Thomas Hobbes Blount produced an anonymous broadsheet of "sayings" from Hobbes' book Leviathan.

In 1693 Blount used his ironic approach to argue for the validity of William and Mary. His King William and Queen Mary Conquerors argued that they were, in fact, conquerors of England, since they landed with force; therefore the people should support them as able protectors, as Hobbes had argued that the people should obey anyone who represented such force. This pamphlet was licensed by the Tory licensor Edmund Bohun. In 1695 Parliament debated the fate of the work and had it, too, burned by the common hangman; and Bohun lost his position. The Act for the licensing of the press was allowed to expire, as well.

In 1689 Blount's wife had died, and he wanted to marry her sister, but such marriages were illegal at that time in England. He wrote to the Archbishop of Canterbury in 1693 and requested permission, but was denied. In August 1693 he committed suicide. Alexander Pope wrote in a footnote to his 'Epilogue to the Satires: Dialogue I' that Blount, 'being in love with a near kinswoman of his, and rejected, gave himself a stab in the arm, as pretending to kill himself, of the consequence of which he really died'.

== Works on religion and deism ==
In 1679 Blount published, anonymously, Anima Mundi, an essay that appeared to review pagan theories of the soul and afterlife. Throughout, Blount says that it is perfectly clear that the soul is immortal and that there is an afterlife, but his statements are made in a way that makes them absurd, and lengthy descriptions of other views are then juxtaposed with patently insincere claims that the Church must be correct. Henry Compton, then bishop of London, argued that the book should be suppressed, but while Compton was out of the city, enthusiastic opponents of the work had it publicly burned. The same year, Blount sent a copy of the work to Thomas Hobbes, whose philosophy Blount admired, with a letter in praise of Arianism, which was then published.

Blount's deist publications came in 1680, with Great Diana of the Ephesians and The Two First Books of Philostratus concerning the Life of Apollonius Tyaneus. The two works appear to be translations and history. However, the notes in the work attacked Christianity directly. First, Blount suggested that rational religion was destroyed by the Church. Second, his decrying of pagan sacrifices was a coded attack on eucharistic doctrine and Church practice. He attached extensive notes which mocked "priestcraft" and corrupt priests.

He followed this with a smaller work, Miracles, No Violations of the Laws of Nature (1683), which contained only quotations from Thomas Burnet, Hobbes, and Baruch Spinoza, combined to say that accounts of miracles are without any empirical basis.

He also wrote his own Religio laici (1683) to answer John Dryden's Religio Laici (1682) and its attacks on deism.

In 1693, Charles Gildon edited and published The Oracles of Reason. This book is a collection of Deist writings supplied by Blount. It comprises a "Preface" by Gildon, Blount's "Vindication of Dr. Burnet", an English translation by "H. B." of three sections of Thomas Burnet's Archaeologiae Philosophicae, Blount's "Summary Account of the Deists Religion", and several letters (tracts) prepared by Blount, Gildon, and others. These pieces express doubts about the Book of Genesis, deny the possibility of revelation, deny miracles, and suggest that there might be many worlds with life on them. In 1695, Gildon republished The Oracles of Reason in his collection of The Miscellaneous Works of Charles Blount. As well as The Oracles of Reason, this book contains Anima Mundi, Diana of the Ephesians, An Appeal from the Country to the City, for the Preservation of His Majesty's Person, Liberty, Property, and the Protestant Religion, A Just Vindication of Learning, and the Liberty of the Press, and "A Dialogue between K. W. and the late K. J. on the Banks of the Boyn, the Day before the Battel". Writing as "Lindamour", Gildon prefaced these works with an invented letter "To the Honorable and Divine Hermione. Giving an account of the Life and Death of the Author.", also known as Gildon's hagiographic "Life of Blount".

== Bibliography ==
- 1673 - Mr. Dreyden vindicated in a reply to the friendly vindication of mr. Dreyden with reflections of the ROTA
- 1679 - An appeal from the country to the city, for the preservation of his majesties person, liberty, property, and the protestant religion
- 1679 - A just vindication of learning ...
- 1679 - Anima mundi: or an historical narration of the opinions of the ancients concerning man's soul after this life: according to unenlightened nature
- 1683 - The Two First Books of Philostratus concerning the Life of Apollonius Tyaneus
- 1683 - Miracles, no violations of the laves of nature
- 1693 - King William and Queen Mary conquerors: ...
- 1693 - Reasons humbly offered for the liberty of unlicens'd printing, to whoch is subjoin'd the just and true character of Edmund Bohun, the licenser of the press
- 1695 - Great is Diana of the Ephesians: or the original of idolatry, together with the politick institutions of the gentile sacrifices
- 1695 - The miscellaneous works of Charles Blount esq.
- 1695 - A just vindication of learning, and the liberty of the press
