= Henry Blount (knight) =

British landowner and writer (1602–1682)

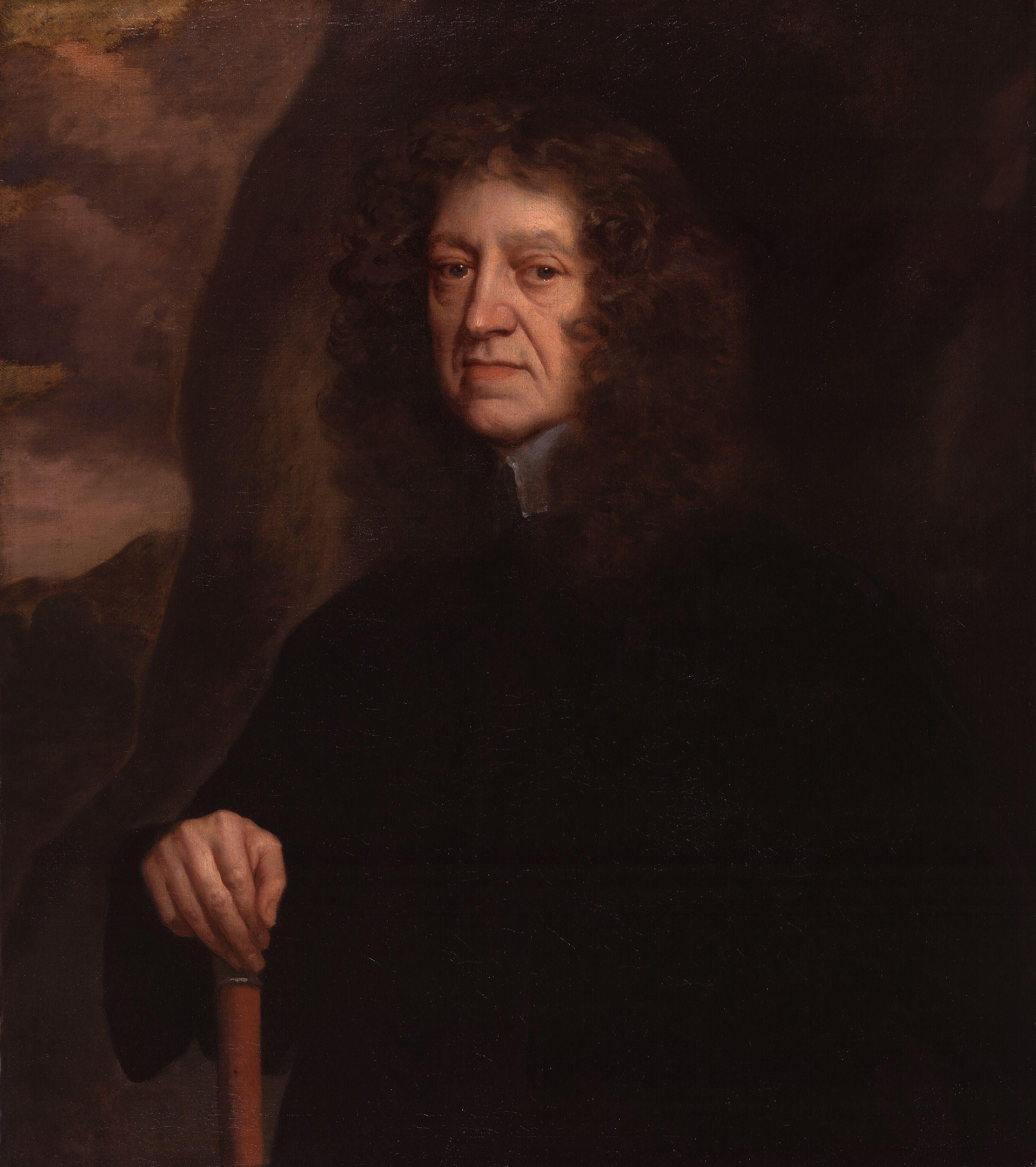
Sir Henry Blount, by Sir Peter Lely.

Sir Henry Blount (1602–1682) was a 17th-century English landowner, traveller and writer.

== Life ==
He was the third son of Sir Thomas Pope Blount (1552–1638) of Blount's Hall, Staffordshire and Tyttenhanger, Hertfordshire and was educated at St Albans Free School and Trinity College, Oxford. He travelled extensively in Europe and the Levant and was author of Voyage into the Levant published in London in 1634.

He was knighted in 1639. He served Charles I during the English Civil War and was present at the Battle of Edgehill but he was acquitted by Parliament and later served in 1655 on a commission to consider methods of improving the trade and navigation of the Commonwealth of England.

He was heir of his elder brother Thomas and inherited the estate at Tyttenhanger in 1654. He replaced the old manor house with a new mansion Tyttenhanger House in about 1654. He served as High Sheriff of Hertfordshire in 1661.

His likeness painted by Sir Peter Lely is exhibited in the National Portrait Gallery.

Blount married Hester Mainwaring, née Wase and had seven sons including Thomas Pope Blount (see Blount baronets) and Charles Blount.
