= Charles Yorke, 8th Earl of Hardwicke =

British peer (1869–1936)

The Right Honourable The Earl of Hardwicke

8th Earl of Hardwicke
- Tenure: 13 March 1909 – 1 February 1936
- Predecessor: John Yorke, 7th Earl of Hardwicke
- Successor: Philip Yorke, 9th Earl of Hardwicke
- Born: Charles Alexander Yorke; 11 November 1869; London, England
- Died: 1 February 1936 (aged 66); Bournemouth, Dorset, England
- Spouses: Ellen Russell (m. 1911; div. 1926) Mary Radley Twist (m. 1930)
- Issue: Lady Elizabeth Yorke
- Father: John Yorke, 7th Earl of Hardwicke
- Mother: Edith Mary Oswald

Charles Alexander Yorke, 8th Earl of Hardwicke (11 November 1869 – 1 February 1936) was a British peer.

Yorke was born in 1869. He succeeded as the 8th Earl of Hardwicke in 1909. He had worked as a miner in Australia and America and was a pioneer balloonist. During the First World War he was a Lieutenant in the Royal Navy Volunteer Reserve and also a King's Foreign Service Messenger.

Lord Hardwicke married Ellen Russell (known as Nellie Russell), a New Zealander, in April 1911. They were divorced in 1926 on the grounds of his misconduct and infidelity. They had one daughter, Lady Elizabeth Mary Yorke, and were the maternal grandparents of Anne Glenconner.

Ellen, Countess of Hardwicke, was made a Commander of the British Empire (CBE) in 1918 for services to the New Zealand War Contingent Association, and for helping to establish the New Zealand General Hospital in Walton-on-Thames to treat wounded New Zealand soldiers. She died in 1968.

Lord Hardwicke married his second wife, Mary Radley Twist, in 1930. She died in 1938.

Lord Hardwicke died in February 1936 in Bournemouth. He was succeeded by his nephew Philip G. Yorke.

== See also ==
- Earl of Hardwicke

Peerage of Great Britain
Preceded by John Yorke	Earl of Hardwicke; 1909–1936	Succeeded by Philip Grantham Yorke
