= James Lindsay, 5th Earl of Balcarres =

Scottish peer

- Earl of Balcarres

5th Earl of Balcarres
- Predecessor: Alexander Lindsay, 4th Earl of Balcarres
- Successor: Alexander Lindsay, 6th Earl of Balcarres
- Born: 14 November 1691
- Died: 20 February 1768 (aged 76); Balcarres, Fife, Scotland
- Buried: Balcarres, Fife, Scotland
- Noble family: Lindsay
- Spouse: Anne Dalrymple
- Issue: Lady Anne Lindsay; Alexander Lindsay, 6th Earl of Balcarres; Lady Margaret Lindsay; Hon. Robert Lindsay; Hon. Colin Lindsay; Hon. James Stair Lindsay; Hon. William Lindsay; Rt. Rev. Hon. Charles Dalrymple Lindsay; Lt-Col. Hon. John Lindsay; Lady Elizabeth Lindsay; Hon. Hugh Lindsay
- Father: Colin Lindsay, 3rd Earl of Balcarres
- Mother: Lady Margaret Campbell
- Occupation: Naval officer, Army officer, Scottish peer

James Lindsay, 5th Earl of Balcarres (14 November 1691 – 20 February 1768) was a Scottish peer, the son of Colin Lindsay, 3rd Earl of Balcarres and Lady Margaret Campbell, daughter of the Earl of Loudoun. He became the 5th Earl of Balcarres on 25 July 1736 on the death of his brother Alexander Lindsay, 4th Earl of Balcarres.

== Military career ==
Lindsay joined the Royal Navy at the age of 13 and served in it for 12 years. On 17 October 1705 he joined the 70-gun ship of the line HMS Ipswich as a volunteer. He transferred in that rank to the 70-gun ship of the line HMS Bedford on 11 November 1706, and served in her until 6 May of the following year. On 18 June he joined the 64-gun ship of the line HMS Defiance, rated as an able seaman, and he was promoted to midshipman on her on 19 December. Lindsay transferred to the 70-gun ship of the line HMS Burford on 27 September 1708 and passed his examination for promotion to the rank of lieutenant on 14 April 1710. He was promoted to that rank on 17 May 1711 and sent to serve on the 24-gun frigate HMS Lizard. He transferred to serve as second lieutenant on board the 54-gun fourth-rate HMS Portland on 30 June, which he did until 31 October 1712. This was his final service in the navy. On his return to Scotland he was persuaded to join his father in the 1715 Jacobite rising and took part in the inconclusive Battle of Sheriffmuir. After the suppression of the uprising he was forced to hide for some time in a secret chamber at the nearby castle of Newark until his aunt secured him a pardon, although in 1716 he was dismissed from the navy. He then joined the army of George I and fought in the War of the Austrian Succession, being present at the Battle of Dettingen in 1743, and the Battle of Fontenoy in 1745.

After he left the army, his prospects limited by his past allegiances, he concentrated on improving the house and estate farms at Balcarres.

== Marriage and family ==
On 24 October 1749, at the age of 58, Lindsay married in Edinburgh the 22-year-old Anne Dalrymple (1727–1820), daughter of Sir Robert Dalrymple, with whom he had eight sons and three daughters:

- Lady Anne Lindsay (1750–1825), poet and songwriter, married Andrew Barnard, without issue.
- Alexander Lindsay, 6th Earl of Balcarres (1752–1825), married Elizabeth Dalrymple, and had issue.
- Lady Margaret Lindsay (1753–1814), married firstly Alexander Fordyce, without issue. Married secondly Sir James Lamb, 1st Baronet, without issue.
- Hon. Robert Lindsay (1754–1836), married Elizabeth Dick, and had issue.
- Hon. Colin Lindsay (1755–1795), an Army Officer, died in action in Grenada.
- Hon. James Stair Lindsay (1758–1783), an Army officer, killed at Cuddalore. Unmarried.
- Hon. William Lindsay (1759–1785), drowned in St Helena.
- Rt. Rev. Hon. Charles Dalrymple Lindsay (1760–1846), married firstly Elizabeth Fudell, and had issue. Married secondly Catherine Coussmaker, and had issue.
- Lt-Col. Hon. John Lindsay (1762–1826), married Lady Charlotte North, daughter of Frederick North, 2nd Earl of Guilford, without issue.
- Lady Elizabeth Lindsay (1763–1858), married Philip Yorke, 3rd Earl of Hardwicke, and had issue.
- Hon. Hugh Lindsay (1765–1844), married Jane Duff-Gordon, daughter of Hon. Alexander Gordon, Lord Rockville, and had issue.

Lady Balcarres was a famously severe mother. Her descendant Lady Waterford told how:

when one of her little boys disobeyed her, [she] ordered the servants to fling him into the pond in front of the house. He managed to scramble out again; she bade them throw him in a second time, and a second time he got out, and when she ordered it a third time, he exclaimed in his broad Scotch accent, 'Woman, wad ye droun yer ain son?'

== Death ==
He died on 20 February 1768 at age 76 at Balcarres, Fife, Scotland, where he was buried. His title was inherited by his eldest son Alexander Lindsay, 6th Earl of Balcarres.

== Sources ==
- Harrison, Cy (2019). Royal Navy Officers of the Seven Years War. Warwick, England: Helion. ISBN 978-1-912866-68-7.
- The Balcarres history

Peerage of Scotland
Preceded by Alexander Lindsay	Earl of Balcarres; 1736–1768	Succeeded by Alexander Lindsay
