= Green Ribbon Club =

17th century English political society

The Green Ribbon Club was one of the earliest of the loosely combined associations which met from time to time in London taverns or coffeehouses for political purposes in the 17th century. The green ribbon was the badge of the Levellers in the English Civil Wars, in which many of them had fought, and was an overt reminder of the radical origins of the club's loyalties.

== Meetings and name ==
The club met at the King's Head tavern at Chancery Lane End and therefore was known as the King's Head Club. It seems to have been founded about the year 1675 by men of a political faction hostile to the king's court. These associates wore on their hats a bow, or bob, of green ribbon, as a distinguishing badge useful for the purpose of mutual recognition in street brawls. The name of the club was changed, about 1679, to the Green Ribbon Club. The King's Head Tavern, described by Roger North as "over against" (meaning opposite) the Inner Temple Gate, was at the corner of Fleet Street and Chancery Lane, on the east side of the latter thoroughfare.

== Membership ==
The frequenters of the club were the extreme faction of the country party, the men who supported Titus Oates, and who were concerned in the Rye House Plot and Monmouth's rebellion. North tells us that they admitted all strangers that were confidingly introduced, for it was the main end of their institutions to make proselytes, especially of the raw estated youth newly come to town. According to Dryden (Absalom and Achitophel) drinking was the chief attraction, and the members talked and organized sedition over their cups.

Thomas Dangerfield supplied the court with a list of forty-eight members of the Green Ribbon Club in 1679; and although Dangerfield's numerous perjuries make his unsupported evidence worthless, it receives confirmation as regards several names from a list given to James II by Nathaniel Wade in 1685 (Harleian Manuscript 6845,), while a number of more eminent personages are mentioned in The Cabal, a satire published in 1680, as also frequenting the club.

From such sources it appears that the Duke of Monmouth himself, and statesmen like Halifax, Shaftesbury, Buckingham, Macclesfield, Cavendish, Bedford, Grey of Warke, were among those who fraternized at the King's Head Tavern with third-rate writers such as Scroop, Mulgrave and Shadwell; with remnants of the Cromwellian régime like Lord Falconbridge, John Claypole and Henry Ireton (two sons-in-law and a grandson of the old Protector); with such profligates as Lord Howard of Escrick and Sir Henry Blount; and with scoundrels of the type of Dangerfield and Oates.

An allusion to Dangerfield, notorious among his other crimes and treacheries for a seditious paper found in a meal-tub, is found in connection with the club in The Loyal Subject's Litany, one of the innumerable satires of the period, in which occur the lines:

"From the dark-lanthorn Plot, and the Green Ribbon Club
From brewing sedition in a sanctified Tub, Libera nos, Domine".

== Activities ==
The club was the headquarters of the Whig opposition to the court, and its members were active promoters of conspiracy and sedition. The president was either Lord Shaftesbury or Sir Robert Peyton, MP for Middlesex, who later turned informer. The Green Ribbon Club served both as a debating society and an intelligence department for the Whig faction. Questions under discussion in parliament were here threshed out by the members over their tobacco and ale; the latest news from Westminster or the city was retailed in the tavern, for some or others were continually coming and going, says Roger North, to import or export news and stories.

Slander of the court or the Tories was invented in the club and sedulously spread over the town, and measures were concerted there for pushing on the Exclusion Bill, or for promoting the pretensions of the Duke of Monmouth. The popular credulity as to Catholic outrages in the days of the Popish Plot was stimulated by the scandalmongers of the club, whose members went about in silk armour, supposed to be bulletproof, in which any man dressed up was as safe as a house, says North, for it was impossible to strike him for laughing; while in their pockets, for street and crowd-work, they carried the weapon of offence, a kind of club, invented by Stephen College and known as the Protestant Flail.

The genius of Shaftesbury found in the Green Ribbon Club the means of constructing the first systematized political organization in England. North relates that every post conveyed the news and tales legitimated there, as also the malign constructions of all the good actions of the government, especially to places where elections were depending, to shape men's characters into fit qualifications to be chosen or rejected. In the general election of January and February 1679 the Whig interest throughout the country was managed and controlled by a committee sitting at the club in Chancery Lane.

The club's organizing activity was also effective in the agitation of the Petitioners in 1679. This celebrated movement was engineered by the Green Ribbon Club with all the skill and energy of a modern caucus. The petitions were prepared in London and sent down to every part of the country, where paid canvassers took them from house to house collecting signatures with an air of authority that made refusal difficult. The great pope-burning processions in 1680 and 1681, on the anniversary of Queen Elizabeth's accession, were also organized by the club. They ended by the lighting of a huge bonfire in front of the club windows; and as they proved an effective means of inflaming the religious passions of the populace, it was at the Green Ribbon Club that the mobile vulgus first received the nickname of the mob. The activity of the club was short-lived.

== Decline ==
The failure to carry the Exclusion Bill, one of the favourite projects of the faction, was a blow to its influence, which declined rapidly after the flight of Shaftesbury, the confiscation of the city of London's charter, and the discovery of the Rye House Plot, in which many of its members were implicated. In 1685 John Ayloffe, who was found to have been a clubber at the King's Head Tavern and a green-ribbon man, was executed in front of the premises on the spot where the pope-burning bonfires had been kindled; and although the tavern was still in existence in the time of Queen Anne, the Green Ribbon Club which made it famous did not survive the accession of James II.

== See also ==
- Secret Treaty of Dover
