= Joseph Yorke, 10th Earl of Hardwicke =

British peer (born 1971)

Joseph Philip Sebastian Yorke, 10th Earl of Hardwicke (born 3 February 1971) is a British peer.

== Background ==
Yorke succeeded to the title at the age of three, on the death of his grandfather, Philip Yorke, 9th Earl of Hardwicke, on 31 December 1974; his father, Philip Yorke, Viscount Royston, had died 1 January 1973. He took his seat in the Lords at age 22, making him the youngest member then sitting; he was a member from 1993 to 1999, since he was not elected as a representative Peer under the House of Lords Act 1999.

== Drugs case ==
In 1999, Lord Hardwicke received a suspended two-year prison sentence for supplying cocaine following a sting operation by the News of the World newspaper at the House of Lords. Journalists had posed as Arab sheiks, with the jury noting the "extreme provocation" used in the incident. Hardwicke was suspended by the Conservative Party following the revelations.

== Personal life ==
Lord Hardwicke married, in 2008, Siobhan Loftus (born 1961). They have one child, Philip Alexander Joseph Yorke, Viscount Royston, who is the heir apparent to the peerages.

Hardwicke's cousin, Louis Waymouth, a writer for the TV comedy series Armstrong and Miller, is married to Lady Eloise Anson, daughter of the 5th Earl of Lichfield.

Peerage of Great Britain
| Preceded by Philip Grantham Yorke | Earl of Hardwicke; 1974–present | Incumbent; Heir apparent: Philip Yorke, Viscount Royston |
