= Philip Yorke, 3rd Earl of Hardwicke =

British politician

The Right Honourable The Earl of Hardwicke KG PC FRS
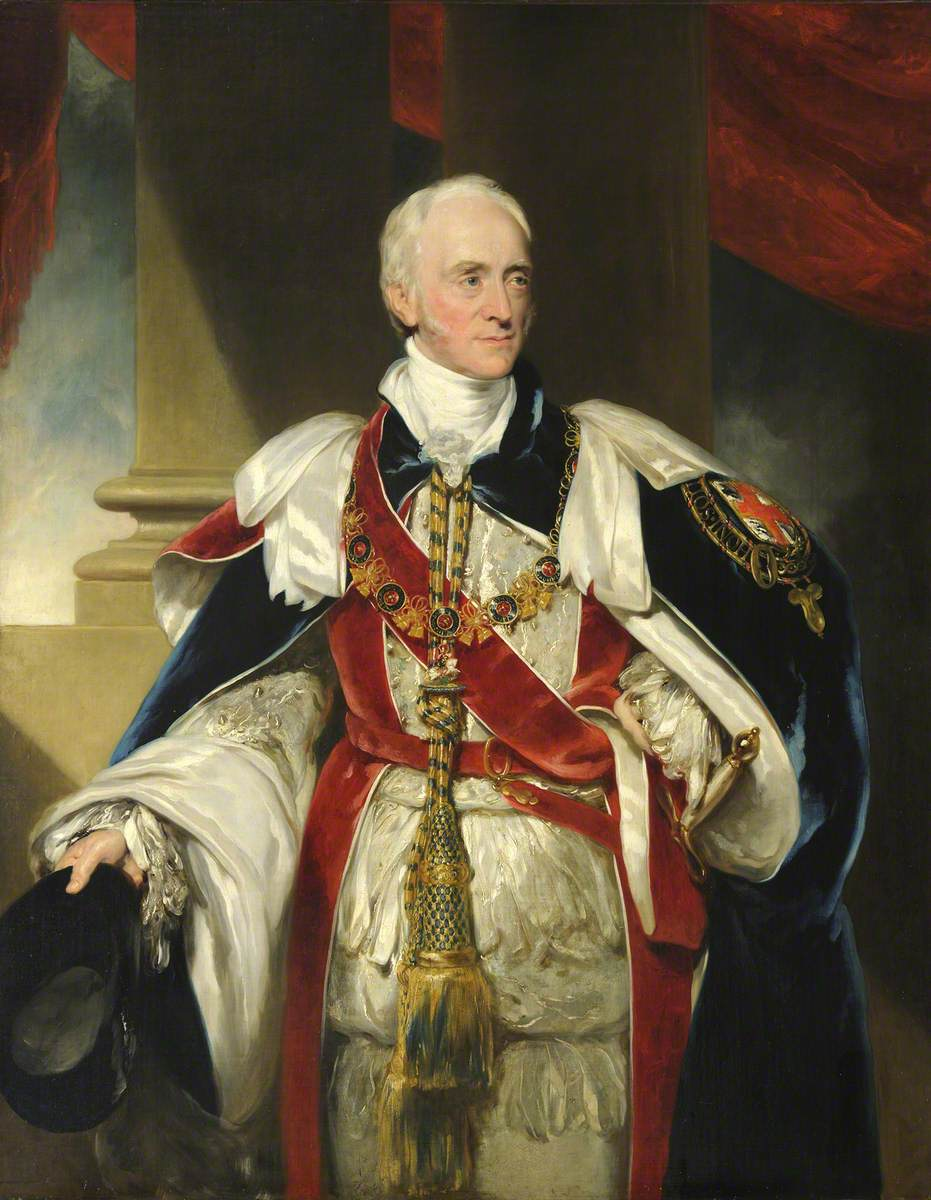
- Portrait by Thomas Phillips, 1807–1845

Lord Lieutenant of Ireland
- In office 27 April 1801 – 21 November 1805
- Monarch: George III
- Prime Minister: Henry Addington; William Pitt the Younger
- Preceded by: The Marquess Cornwallis
- Succeeded by: The Earl of Powis

Member of Parliament for Cambridgeshire
- In office 1780–1790
- Preceded by: Sir John Hynde Cotton, Bt
- Succeeded by: Charles Philip Yorke

Personal details
- Born: 31 May 1757 Cambridge, Cambridgeshire
- Died: 18 November 1834 (aged 77)
- Spouse: Lady Elizabeth Lindsay (m. 1782)
- Children: 8, including Philip
- Education: Queens' College, Cambridge

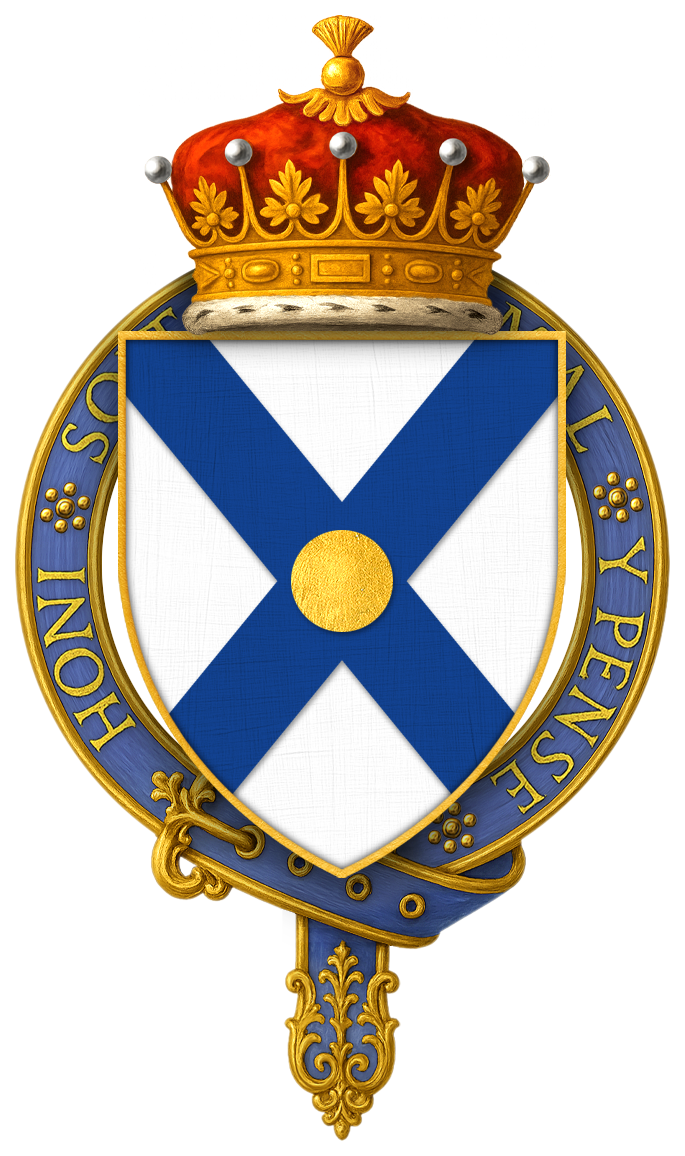
Garter-encircled arms of Philip Yorke, 3rd Earl of Hardwicke, KG, PC, FRS

Philip Yorke, 3rd Earl of Hardwicke (31 May 1757 – 18 November 1834), known as Philip Yorke until 1790, was a British politician.

== Background and education ==
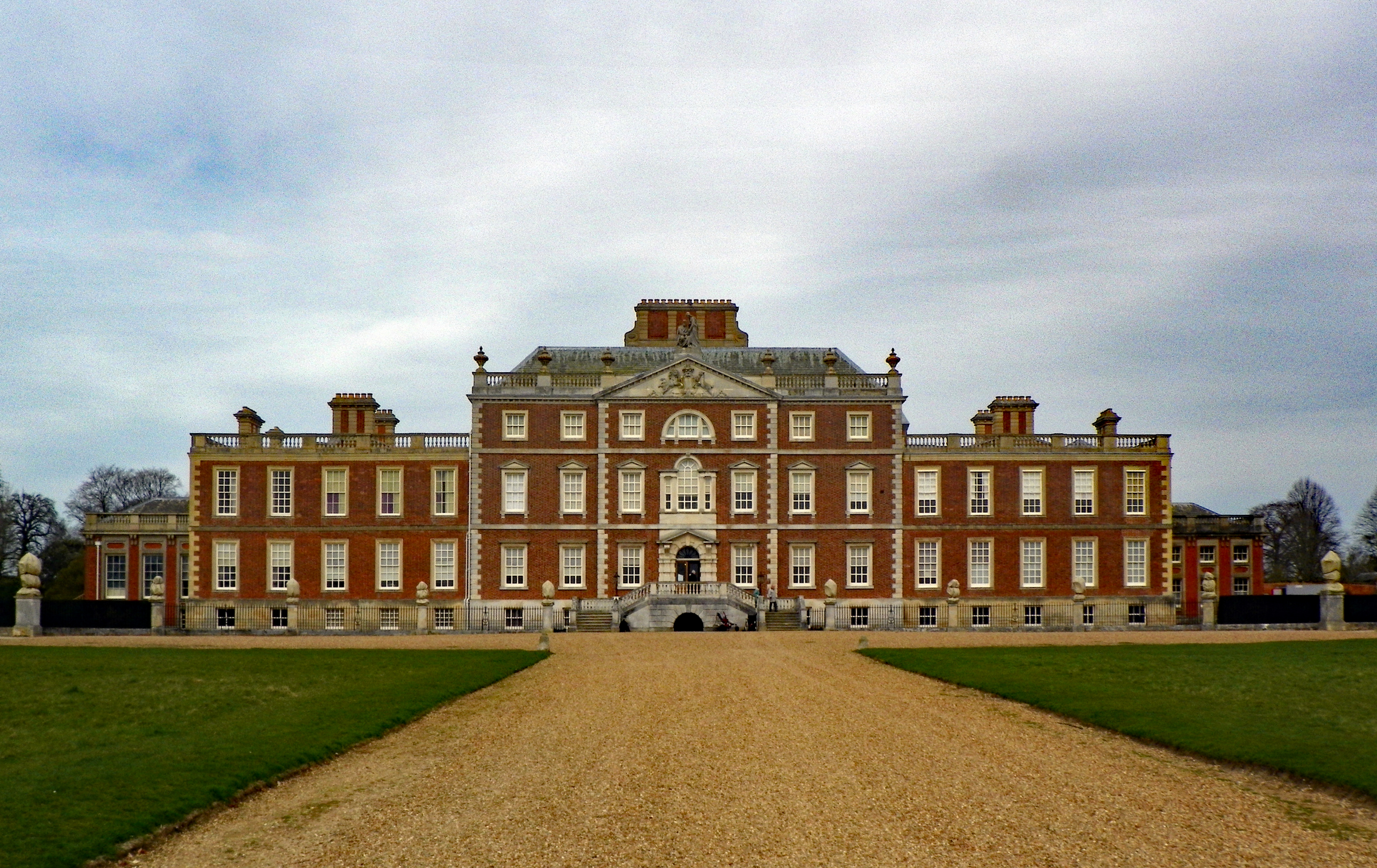
Wimpole Hall

Born in Cambridge, England, he was the eldest son of Charles Yorke, Lord Chancellor, by his first wife, Catherine Freman. He was educated at Harrow and Queens' College, Cambridge.

On 31 January 1788 his uncle Philip Yorke, 2nd Earl of Hardwicke, as Lord Lieutenant of Cambridgeshire, appointed him as Colonel of the Cambridgeshire Militia, a command which he held for many years, even after he had become Lord Lieutenant himself.

In 1790 he succeeded his uncle to his earldom and estates, including Wimpole Hall.

== Political career ==
Hardwicke was Member of Parliament for Cambridgeshire from 1780 to 1790, following the Whig traditions of his family, but after his succession to the earldom in 1790 he supported William Pitt The Younger, and took office in 1801 as Lord Lieutenant of Ireland (1801–1806), where he supported Catholic emancipation. He was sworn of the Privy Council in 1801, created a Knight of the Garter in 1803, and was a fellow of the Royal Society.

== Family ==
Lord Hardwicke married Lady Elizabeth, daughter of James Lindsay, 5th Earl of Balcarres, in 1782. They had four sons and four daughters.

- Philip Yorke, Viscount Royston (7 May 1784 – 7 April 1808), Member of Parliament for Reigate but was lost at sea off Lübeck (having died without issue);
- Lady Anne Yorke (13 April 1783 – 17 July 1870); married John Savile, 3rd Earl of Mexborough, and had issue.
- Lady Catherine Freeman Yorke (14 April 1786 – 8 July 1863); married Du Pré Alexander, 2nd Earl of Caledon, and had issue.
- Charles Yorke (23 August 1787 – 28 December 1791)
- Lady Elizabeth Margaret Yorke (1789 – 23 June 1867); married Charles Stuart, 1st Baron Stuart de Rothesay, and had issue.
- Lady Caroline Harriet Yorke (15 October 1794 – 27 May 1873); married John Somers-Cocks, 2nd Earl Somers, and had issue.
- Charles James Yorke, Viscount Royston (14 July 1797 – 30 April 1810); died at Wimpole of scarlet fever.
- Hon. Joseph John Yorke (12 August 1800 – 23 March 1801), died in infancy

Lord Hardwicke died on 18 November 1834, aged 77, and was buried St Andrew's Church in Wimpole, Cambridgeshire, in a tomb by Richard Westmacott the Younger. As he had no surviving male issue, he was succeeded in the earldom by his nephew Charles. Lady Hardwicke died on 26 May 1858, aged 94.

Parliament of Great Britain
Preceded by Sir John Hynde Cotton, Bt; Sir Sampson Gideon, Bt	Member of Parliament for Cambridgeshire; 1780–1790; With: Lord Robert Manners 1780–1782; Sir Henry Peyton, Bt 1782–1789; James Whorwood Adeane 1789–1790	Succeeded by James Whorwood Adeane; Charles Philip Yorke
Political offices
Preceded by The Marquess Cornwallis	Lord Lieutenant of Ireland; 1801–1805	Succeeded by The Earl of Powis
Honorary titles
Preceded by The Earl of Hardwicke	Lord Lieutenant of Cambridgeshire; 1790–1834	Succeeded by The Earl of Hardwicke
Peerage of Great Britain
Preceded by Philip Yorke	Earl of Hardwicke; 1790–1834	Succeeded by Charles Philip Yorke
