= Blount baronets =

There have been two baronetcies created for persons with the surname Blount (pronounced "Blunt"), both in the Baronetage of England. Both creations are extinct.

- Blount baronets of Sodington (1642)
- Blount baronets of Tittenhanger (1680)
