= Charles Yorke =

British lawyer and politician

The Right Honourable Charles Yorke PC
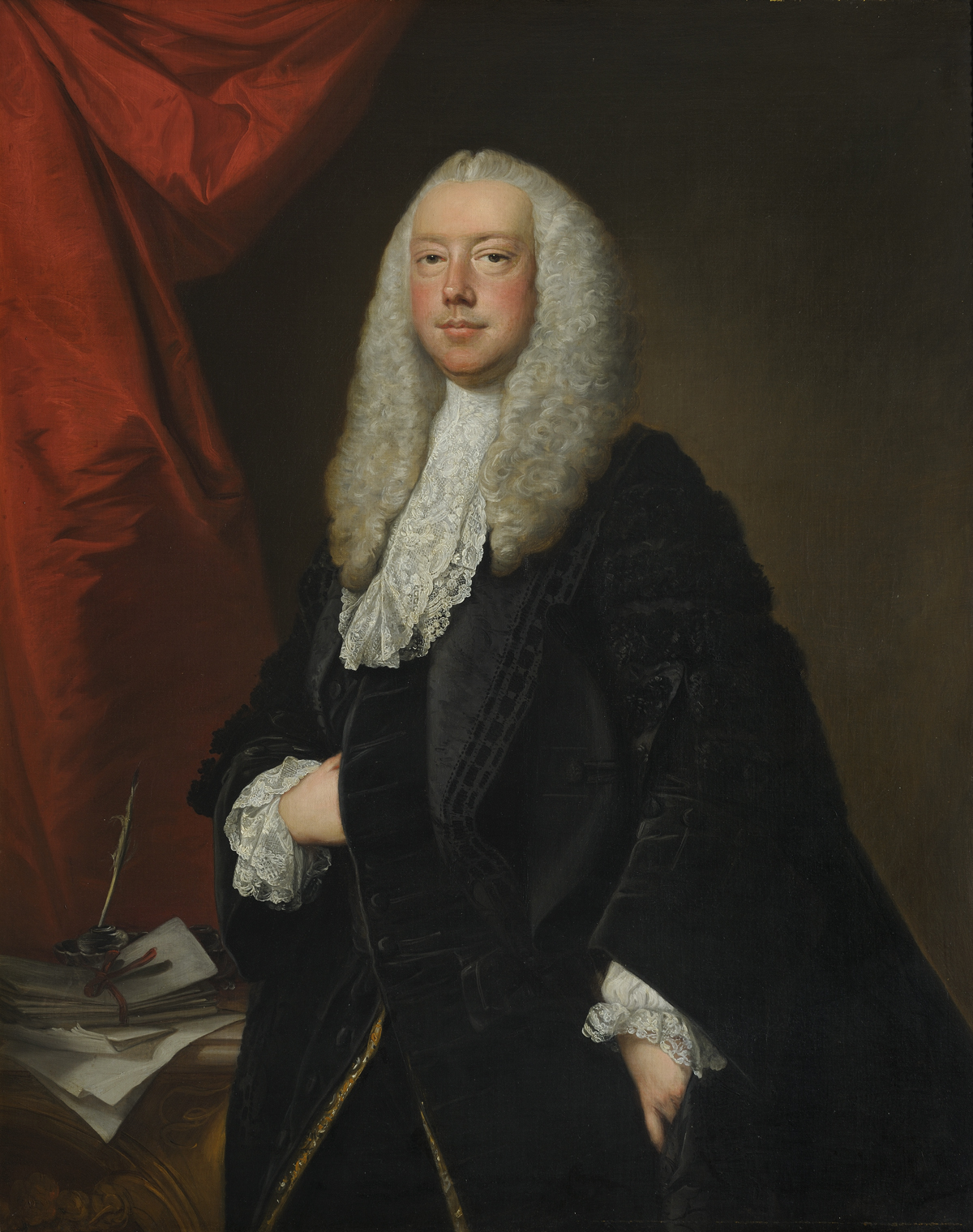
- Portrait by Thomas Hudson, c. 1756

Lord Chancellor
- In office 17 January 1770 – 20 January 1770
- Monarch: George III
- Prime Minister: The Duke of Grafton
- Preceded by: The Lord Camden
- Succeeded by: In Commission

Personal details
- Born: 30 December 1722 London, England
- Died: 20 January 1770 (aged 47) London, England
- Education: Corpus Christi College, Cambridge

Charles Yorke PC (30 December 1722 – 20 January 1770) was a British lawyer and politician who briefly served as Lord High Chancellor of Great Britain. His father was also Lord Chancellor, and he began his career as a Member of Parliament. He served successively as Solicitor-General and Attorney-General for several governments, during which he was best known for writing what became the Quebec Act. He was appointed Lord Chancellor over his objections, but he committed suicide only three days after taking the post.

== Life ==
The second son of Philip Yorke, 1st Earl of Hardwicke, he was born in London, and was educated at Newcome's School in Hackney and Corpus Christi College, Cambridge. His literary abilities were shown at an early age by his collaboration with his brother Philip in the Athenian Letters. In 1745 he published an able treatise on the law of forfeiture for high treason, in defence of the severe sentences his father had given to the Scottish Jacobite peers following the Battle of Culloden. In the following year he was called to the bar.

His father being at this time Lord Chancellor, Yorke obtained a sinecure appointment in the Court of Chancery in 1747, and entered Parliament as member for Reigate, a seat which he afterwards exchanged for that for the University of Cambridge. He quickly made his mark in the House of Commons, one of his earliest speeches being in favour of his father's reform of the marriage law that led to the Marriage Act 1753. In 1750 he was elected a Fellow of the Royal Society.

In 1751, he became counsel to the East India Company, and in 1756 he was appointed Solicitor-General, a place which he retained in the administration of the elder Pitt, of whose foreign policy he was a powerful defender.

He resigned with Pitt in 1761, but in 1762 became Attorney-General under Lord Bute. He continued to hold this office when George Grenville became Prime Minister (April 1763), and advised the government on the question raised by John Wilkes's The North Briton. Yorke refused to describe the libel as treasonable, while pronouncing it a high misdemeanour. In the following November, he resigned office. Resisting Pitt's attempt to draw him into alliance against the ministry he had quit, Yorke maintained, in a speech that prompted the highest eulogy from Horace Walpole, that parliamentary privilege did not extend to cases of libel; though he agreed with Pitt in condemning the principle of general warrants. Yorke, henceforward a member of the Rockingham party, was elected recorder of Dover in 1764, and in 1765 he again became Attorney-General in the Rockingham administration, whose policy he did much to shape. He supported the repeal of the Stamp Act 1765, while urging the simultaneous passing of the Declaratory Act. His most important measure was the constitution which he drew up for the province of Quebec, and which after his resignation of office became the Quebec Act 1774.

On the accession to power of Chatham and Grafton in 1766, Yorke resigned office, and took little part in the debates in Parliament during the next four years. In 1770, he was invited by the Duke of Grafton, when Camden was dismissed from the Chancellorship, to take his seat on the woolsack. He had, however, explicitly pledged himself to Rockingham and his party not to take office with Grafton. The king exerted all his personal influence to overcome Yorke's scruples, warning him finally that the Great Seal if now refused would never again be within his grasp. Yorke yielded to the king's entreaty, and he was appointed Lord Chancellor and sworn of the Privy Council on 17 January 1770. The story has been told that he went to his brother's house, where he met the leaders of the Opposition, and feeling at once overwhelmed with shame, fled to his own house, where three days later he committed suicide (20 January 1770). The patent raising him to the peerage as Baron Morden had been made out, but his last act was to refuse his sanction to the sealing of the document. More recent scholarship questions this account, noting that he had been in poor health for some time and recently written to his brother of his fatigue. On his wife's account he ate excessively, as he had been doing of late, and complaining of sickness and indigestion was heard retching until his family became concerned and had him carried to bed having broken a blood vessel in his sickness. On this account neither was his death a suicide, nor did he refuse to seal the patent for his peerage. Though remaining unsealed, the patent expired with its peer-designate.

== Family ==
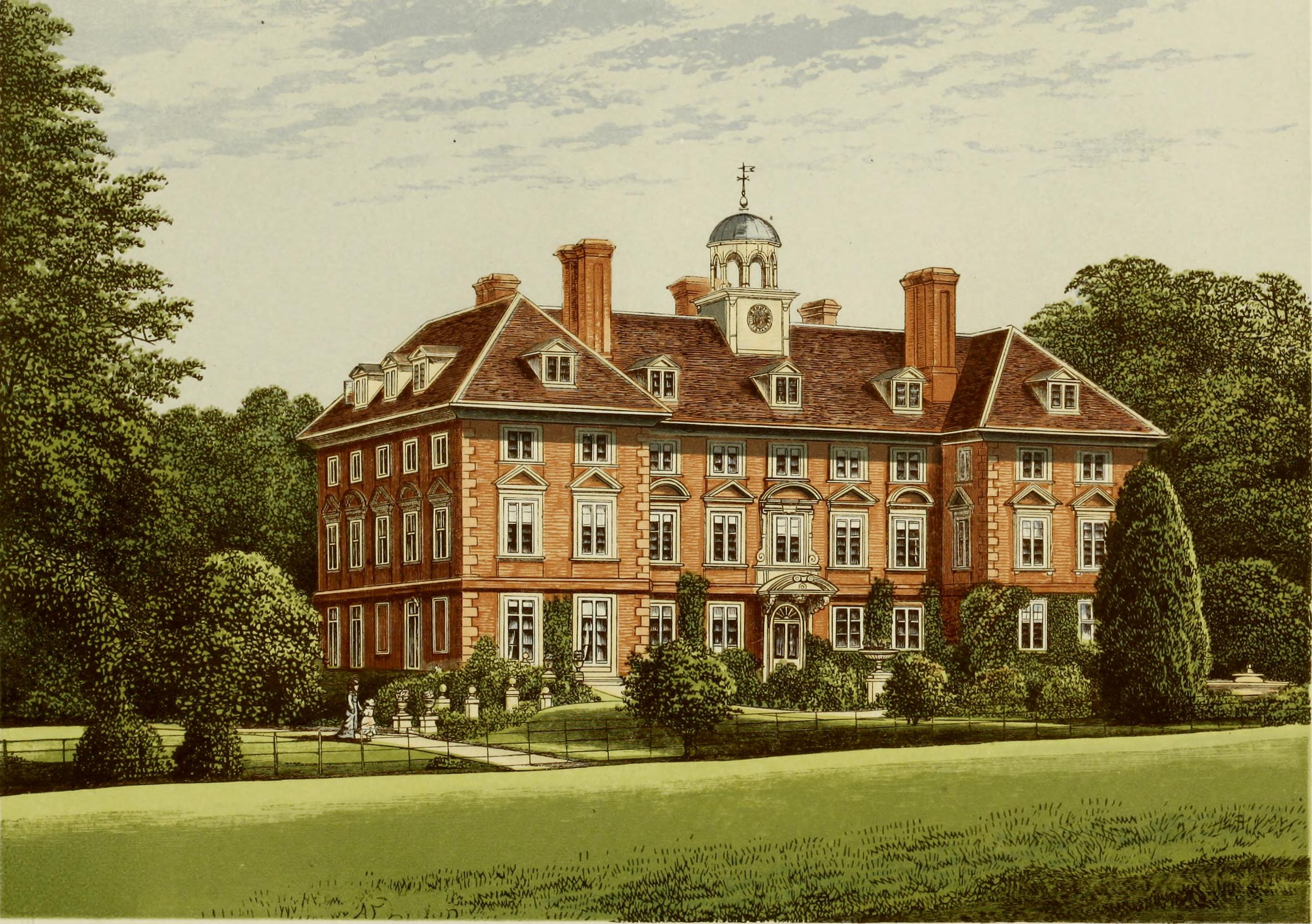
Tyttenhanger House in 1840

Charles Yorke was twice-married:

First, on 19 May 1755 to Katherine Blount Freeman, with one son:

- Philip Yorke, (31 May 1757 – 18 November 1834) became 3rd Earl of Hardwicke

Second, on 30 December 1762 to Agneta Johnson, with children:

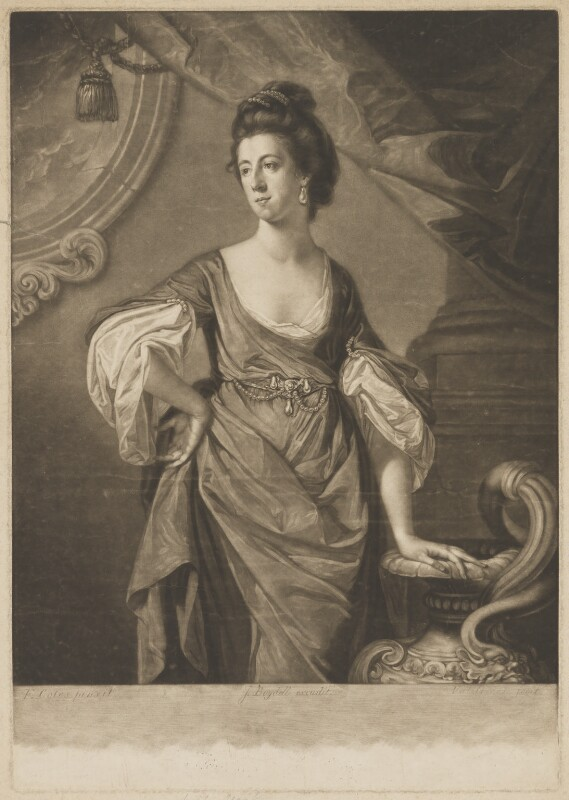
Agneta Yorke, mezzotint by John Boydell after Francis Coates, 1768

- Charles Philip Yorke (12 March 1764 – 13 March 1834) was later to be prominent in government.
- Caroline Yorke (29 August 1765 – 26 July 1818), who married John Eliot, 1st Earl of St Germans.
- Joseph Sydney Yorke (6 June 1768 – 5 May 1831), who became an Admiral in the Royal Navy.

His wife was heiress to Tyttenhanger House, near St Albans, Hertfordshire.

Agneta (1740 – 30 December 1820) exhibited works in pastels at the Society of Artists between 1771 and 1775. She corresponded with William Gilpin, who instructed her and her three children in their art, and she also rendered some of Gilpin's works, including a view of Netley Abbey, as etchings.

She died in 1820. There is a monument to her at St Andrew's Parish Church, Wimpole, Cambridgeshire.

== Bibliography ==
- Cannon, J. (1964) "Yorke, Charles", in L.Namier and J.Brooke (eds.) [1964](1985) The History of Parliament: The House of Commons, 1754–1790, vol.3 new ed., London:Secker & Warburg, ISBN 0-436-30420-1
- — (2004) "Yorke, Charles (1722–1770)", Oxford Dictionary of National Biography, Oxford University Press, accessed 2 March 2008 (subscription, Wikipedia Library access or UK public library membership required). The first edition of this text is available at Wikisource: "Yorke, Charles (1722-1770)" . Dictionary of National Biography. London: Smith, Elder & Co. 1885–1900.
- Yorke, P. C. (1977) [1913]. The Life and Correspondence of Philip Yorke, Earl of Hardwicke, Lord High Chancellor of Great Britain (3 vols ed.). Octagon. ISBN 0-374-98837-4.

Parliament of Great Britain
Preceded by Viscount Royston	Member for Reigate; 1747–1768	Succeeded by John Yorke
Preceded by Edward Finch; Thomas Townshend	Member for Cambridge University; 1768–1770 with Thomas Townshend	Succeeded by Sir William de Grey; Thomas Townshend
Legal offices
Preceded by Sir Richard Lloyd	Solicitor General; 1756–1762	Succeeded by Sir Fletcher Norton
Preceded by Sir Charles Pratt	Attorney General; 1762–1763	Succeeded by Sir Fletcher Norton
Preceded by Sir Fletcher Norton	Attorney General; 1765–1766	Succeeded by Sir William de Grey
Political offices
Preceded by The Lord Camden	Lord High Chancellor of Great Britain; 1770	In commission Title next held by The Earl Bathurst
