= Blount (surname) =

Blount (or Blunt) is a common surname of English derivation, meaning "blonde, fair" (Old French blund), or dull (Middle English blunt, blont)

- Anna Blount (1872–1953), American physician, suffragist and birth control activist
- Annie R. Blount (1839–unknown), American poet, short story writer and newspaper editor
- Armondo Blount (born 2007), American football player
- Bessie Blount Griffin (1914–2009), aka Bessie Blount, African-American inventor
- Charles Blount (disambiguation)
- Christopher Blount (1555/1556–1601)), English soldier, secret agent and rebel
- Edward Blount (disambiguation)
- Elizabeth Blount (1502–1540), mistress of King Henry VIII of England and mother of his illegitimate son, Henry FitzRoy, 1st Duke of Richmond and Somerset
- Eric Blount (born 1970), American football player
- F. Nelson Blount, (1918–1967), President and founder of Blount Seafood Corporation, millionaire and collector of vintage steam locomotives and rail cars
- Harry Blount, 3rd Baronet (1702–1757) of the Blount baronets
- Henry Blount, 4th Earl of Newport (died 1679)
- Henry Blount (knight) (1602–1682), English traveler, landowner and author
- Herman Poole Blount (1914–1993), birth name of Sun Ra, American jazz composer, bandleader, piano and synthesizer player, and poet
- James Blount (disambiguation)
- Jibri Blount (born 1996), American basketball and football player
- Joey Blount (born 1998), American football player
- John Blount (disambiguation)
- Keith Blount (born 1966), British admiral and Fleet Air Arm officer
- LeGarrette Blount (born 1986), American football player
- Mark Blount (born 1975), American basketball player
- Mel Blount (born 1948), American football player
- Michael Blount (1529–1597), English sheriff
- Mountjoy Blount, 1st Earl of Newport (1597–1665), English courtier and politician
- Mountjoy Blount, 2nd Earl of Newport (1630–1674)
- Peter Blount (born 1962 or 1963), American sprinter and bobsledder
- Richard Blount (disambiguation)
- Roy Blount Jr. (born 1941), American humorist
- Thomas Blount (disambiguation)
- W. Frank Blount (born 1938), American businessman
- Walter Blount, 1st Baron Mountjoy (1420–1474)
- William Blount (disambiguation)
- Willie Blount (1768–1835), American politician
- Winton M. Blount (1921–2002), American industrialist and politician

== See also ==
- Governor Blount (disambiguation)
- Senator Blount (disambiguation)
- Blunt (surname)
- Blount (disambiguation)
