= Blount =

Blount may refer to:

== People ==
- Blount (surname), a surname of English derivation

== Place names ==
=== Canada ===
- Blount, Cochrane District, Ontario, an unincorporated place
- a community in the town of Mono, Ontario

=== United States ===
- Blount, Georgia, an unincorporated community
- Blount, West Virginia, an unincorporated community
- Blount County (disambiguation)
- Blount Township, Vermilion County, Illinois
- Fort Blount, Tennessee, a former frontier fort and federal outpost

== Other uses ==
- Blount baronets, two extinct titles in the Baronetage of England
- Blount Building, Chicago, Illinois, United States, an office building
- Mattie T. Blount High School, Eight Mile, Alabama
- William Blount High School, Blount County, Tennessee
- Blount Fine Foods, formerly Blount Seafood, an American prepared foods and soup manufacturer
- Blount, Inc., an equipment manufacturing company

== See also ==
- Blount Report, an 1893 United States House of Representatives report regarding the overthrow of the Kingdom of Hawaii
- Blount Island, Florida, United States
- Blunt (disambiguation)
