= Mountjoy Blount =

Mountjoy Blount may refer to:

- Mountjoy Blount, 1st Earl of Newport (1597–1666), English courtier and politician
- Mountjoy Blount, 2nd Earl of Newport (1630–1675), English nobleman

== See also ==
- Charles Blount, 8th Baron Mountjoy (1563–1606), English nobleman and soldier
