= Thomas Blount =

Thomas Blount may refer to:

== Politicians ==
- Thomas Blount (MP for Dorset), in 1376, MP for Dorset (UK Parliament constituency)
- Thomas Blount (MP for Derbyshire), see Derbyshire (UK Parliament constituency) in 1420
- Thomas Blount (MP for Bristol), see Bristol (UK Parliament constituency) in 1414
- Thomas Blount (died 1568), MP for Worcestershire (UK Parliament constituency)
- Thomas Blount (colonist), (1655-1706) North Carolina representative and magistrate
- Thomas Blount (North Carolina politician) (1759–1812), American Revolutionary War veteran and US representative from North Carolina
- Thomas Blount (inventor) (born c. 1604), English civil war soldier, inventor and MP for Kent

== Others ==
- Thomas Blount (died 1400), supporter of the English Richard II
- Thomas Blount, English Catholic priest, martyred 1647
- Sir Thomas Blount, 1st Baronet (1649–1687), English baronet
- Thomas Blount, 3rd Earl of Newport (died 1675)
- Thomas Blount (lexicographer) (1618–1679), antiquarian and lexicographer
- Thomas Blunt (optician) (?–1823), English scientific instrument maker
