= Henry Blount =

Henry Blount may refer to:

- Henry Blount, 4th Earl of Newport (died 1679), English peer and member of the House of Lords
- Henry Blount (knight) (1602–1682), English traveller, landowner and author

== See also ==
- Harry Blount (disambiguation)
- Henry Blunt (disambiguation)
- Blount (surname)
