= Damon Way =

American designer and entrepreneur (born 1971)

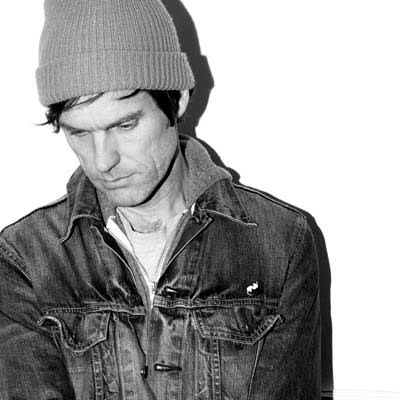
Damon Way

Damon Way (born September 23, 1971) is an American designer, brand marketer, entrepreneur and musician. He co-founded DC Shoes in 1994. In 2008 he became a partner at Incase Designs, and transitioned to Chief Brand Officer. In 2016 he launched skateboarding apparel brand, FACT. In 2018 he cofounded spatial audio brand Syng, where he is Chief Brand Officer.

== Early life ==
Damon Way was born in Portland, Oregon in 1971. He was brought up by his mother alongside younger brother, and professional skateboarder, Danny Way, in San Diego California.

== Career ==
In 1991, he started Eightball clothing with friend Ken Block and Danny Way. They would go on to create a number of brands throughout the early 1990s: Droors Clothing, Dub Brand Outerwear, Blunt Snowboard Magazine, and DC Shoes. In 2004 DC Shoes was sold to Quiksilver. In 2008 Damon left DCShoes to become the Chief Brand Officer and partner at Incase Designs. Damon launched FACT in June, 2016 as a new brand idea deriving from familiar elements of music and skateboarding he experienced through the '80s and '90s. In 2016 he joined ex-Apple designer Christopher Stringer to start Syng, a company committed to advancing spatial sound technologies.
