= Henry Blunt =

Henry Blunt may refer to:

- Henry Blunt (priest) (1794–1843), English Anglican evangelical cleric
- Sir Henry Blunt, 2nd Baronet (1696–1759), of the Blunt baronets
- Henry Blunt, founder of University of West Los Angeles
- Henry Blunt (chemist) (1806–1853), English chemist and painter

== See also ==
- John Henry Blunt (1823–1884), English divine
- Henry Blount (disambiguation) (often pronounced Blunt)
- Blunt (surname)
