= George Blount =

George Blount may refer to:

- George Blount (died 1581) (1513–1581), MP
- George Blount, 2nd Earl of Newport (died 1675)
- Sir George Blount, 2nd Baronet (died 1667) of the Blount baronets

== See also ==
- Blount (surname)
