= John Blunt =

John Blunt may refer to:

- Sir John Blunt (diplomat), British diplomat
- John Henry Blunt (1823–1884), English divine
- John James Blunt (1794–1855), English divine
- John W. Blunt (1840–1910), American Union soldier, Medal of Honor recipient
- Sir John Blunt, 1st Baronet (1665–1733), of the Blunt baronets
- Sir John Harvey Blunt, 8th Baronet (1839–1922), of the Blunt baronets
- Sir John Harvey Blunt, 9th Baronet (1872–1938), of the Blunt baronets
- Sir John Lionel Reginald Blunt, 10th Baronet (1908–1969), of the Blunt baronets
- John Blunt, singer, Freddie Mercury impersonator

== See also ==
- John Blount (disambiguation) (often pronounced Blunt)
