= Blunt (surname) =

Blunt is a common surname of English derivation, meaning "blonde, fair" (Old French blund), or "dull" (Middle English blunt, blont). A variant spelling is Blount.

== Notable people sharing the surname "Blunt" ==
- Lady Anne Blunt (1837–1917), English horsebreeder; wife of Wilfrid Scawen Blunt
- Anthony Blunt (1907–1983), English art historian and Soviet spy
- Bruce Blunt (1899–1957), English poet, journalist and wine merchant
- Charles Blunt (born 1951), Australian politician leader of the National Party of Australia
- Christopher Evelyn Blunt (1904–1987), British merchant banker and numismatist
- Crispin Blunt (born 1961), British Conservative MP for Reigate
- Dean Blunt, British musician, record producer, singer-songwriter, director, and conceptual artist
- E. A. H. Blunt (1877–1941), British civil servant in India and scholarly writer
- Edmund March Blunt (1770–1862), American navigator and magazine publisher
- Emily Blunt (born 1983), British-American actress
- Giles Blunt (born 1952), Canadian author
- Henry Blunt (disambiguation), multiple people
- James Blunt (born 1974), British musician
- James G. Blunt (1826–1881), American physician and abolitionist, Union General in the American Civil War
- John Henry Blunt (1823–1884), British divine
- John James Blunt, (1794–1855), British religious scholar
- Joseph Blunt (1792–1860), American lawyer, author, editor and politician from New York
- Judy Blunt (born 1954), American Writer from Montana
- Leroy Blunt (1921–2016), American politician
- Matt Blunt (born 1970), American politician, governor of Missouri
- N. Bowditch Blunt (1804–1854), American lawyer and politician from New York
- Robbie Blunt (born 1951), English rock guitarist
- Roger Blunt (1900–1966), New Zealand Test cricketer
- Roy Blunt (born 1950), American politician, senator from Missouri, former House Majority Whip and interim House Majority Leader
- Russell Blunt (1908–2004), American high school and collegiate track and basketball coach
- Shannon Blunt, American radar engineer
- Simon F. Blunt (1818–1854), American sailor, cartographer, and ship captain
- Ted Blunt (1943–2024), American politician, educator and athlete
- Wilfrid Scawen Blunt (1840–1922), British poet and writer
- Wilfrid Jasper Walter Blunt (1901–1987), British art teacher, artist, author and curator

== Fictional characters ==
- Alan Blunt, a fictional character from the Alex Rider novel series by Anthony Horowitz
- Arno Blunt, a fictional character in the book Artemis Fowl: The Eternity Code by Eoin Colfer
- Sir Hubert Blunt, a character in the 1980s animated television series Dragon's Lair

== See also ==
- Blount (surname)
- Blunt (disambiguation)
