= James Blount =

James Blount or Blunt may also refer to:

- Sir James Blount (English soldier) (died 1493), sometimes rendered as James Blunt, English military commander
- James Blount, 6th Baron Mountjoy (c.1533–1582), English peer
- James Blount (colonist) (1620-1686), participant in Culpeper's Rebellion in colonial North Carolina
- James G. Blunt (1826–1881), American general
- James Blunt (born 1974), British musician James Hillier Blount
- James Henderson Blount (1837–1903), American statesman
- James A. Blount (1884–1974), American lawyer and politician in Mississippi
- Jim Blount (1935–2017), American newspaper editor and historian
