= William Blunt (disambiguation) =

William Blunt (1800–1889) was a British civil servant.

William Blunt may also refer to:

- Sir Charles William Blunt, 3rd Baronet (1731–1802), of the Blunt baronets
- Sir Charles William Blunt, 6th Baronet (1810–1890), of the Blunt baronets
- Sir William Blunt, 7th Baronet (1826–1902), of the Blunt baronets
- Billy Blunt (1886–1962), English footballer

== See also ==
- William Blount (disambiguation)
- Blunt (surname)
