= Charles Blount =

Charles Blount may refer to:

- Charles Blount, 5th Baron Mountjoy (1516–1544), English courtier and patron of learning
- Charles Blount, 8th Baron Mountjoy (1563–1606), English courtier and soldier, Lord Deputy of Ireland
- Sir Charles Blount (soldier) (1568–1600), English soldier, son of Michael Blount
- Charles Blount (deist) (1654–1693), British author and activist
- Charles Hubert Boulby Blount (1893–1940), RAF officer and cricketer

== See also ==
- Charles Blunt (disambiguation)
- Blount (surname)
