= Charles Blunt (disambiguation) =

Charles Blunt (born 1951) is an Australian businessman and former National Party politician.

Charles Blunt may also refer to:

- Sir Charles Blunt, 3rd Baronet (1731–1802) of the Blunt baronets
- Sir Charles Blunt, 4th Baronet (1775–1840), British member of parliament
- Sir Charles Blunt, 6th Baronet (1810–1890) of the Blunt baronets

== See also ==
- Charles Blount (disambiguation)
- Blunt (surname)
