= Edward Blunt =

Edward Blunt may refer to:

- E. A. H. Blunt (1877–1941), British civil servant
- Edward Blunt (publisher) (1562–1632), English publisher

== See also ==
- Edwin Blunt (1918–1993), English footballer
- Edmund Blunt (1770–1862), American navigator
- Edward Blount (disambiguation), pronounced Blunt
- Ted Blunt (1943–2024), American politician, educator and athlete
