= Richard Blunt =

Richard Blunt may refer to:

- Richard Blunt (bishop) (1833–1910), British bishop
- Richard Blunt (priest), Archdeacon of Totnes, 1265
- Sir Richard David Harvey Blunt, 11th Baronet (1912–1975), of the Blunt baronets
- Richard Blunt (MP), Member of Parliament (MP) for Newcastle-under-Lyme

== See also ==
- Richard Blount (disambiguation)
- Blunt (surname)
