= Blunt =

Blunt may refer to:

- Blunt (surname), a surname (and list of people with the name)
- Blunt (cigar), a term used in the cigar industry to designate blunt-tipped, usually factory-rolled cigars
- Blunt (cannabis), a slang term used in cannabis culture
- "Blunt" (Person of Interest), an episode of the TV series Person of Interest
- Blunt, South Dakota, USA
- Blunt Peninsula, Nunavut, Canada
- Blunt Magazine, an Australian blogging e-zine published quarterly
- Blunt (snowboard magazine), a 1990s American periodical

== See also ==
- Blunt ends, a possible configuration of a DNA molecule
- Blunt force trauma, a type of physical trauma in medical terminology
- Blunt instrument, a category of melee weapons
- Blunted affect, a lack of emotional response in psychology
- Slide (skateboarding) for bluntslide, a skateboard trick
- Blount (disambiguation)
