= Harry Blount =

Harry Blount may refer to:

- Sir Harry Blount, 3rd Baronet (1702–1757) of the Blount baronets
- Harry Blount, fictional character in Vernes' Michael Strogoff

== See also ==
- Henry Blount (disambiguation)
- Blount (surname)
