= Mike Blabac =

Mike Blabac may refer to:

- Mike Blabac (sledge hockey) (born 1974), American ice sledge hockey player
- Mike Blabac (photographer), American photographer
