= Senator Blount (disambiguation) =

William Blount (1749–1800) was a U.S. Senator from Tennessee from 1796 to 1797, also serving in the Tennessee State Senate. Senator Blount may also refer to:

- Clarence W. Blount (1921–2003), Maryland State Senate
- David Blount (born 1967), Mississippi State Senate
- James A. Blount (1884–1974), Mississippi State Senate

== See also ==
- Roy Blunt, former U.S. Senator from Missouri
