= Henry Blunt (chemist) =

English painter

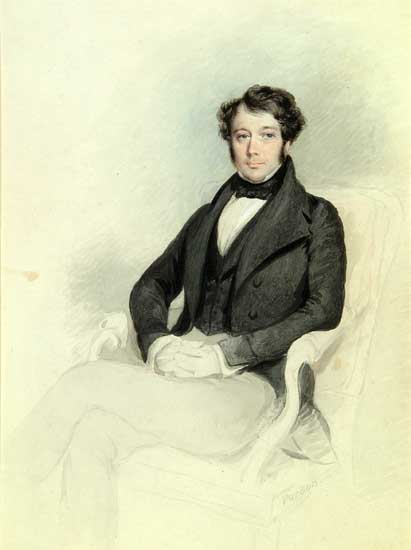
- Watercolour Portrait of Henry Blunt by James Canterbury Pardon
- Born: 14 November 1806; Southwark, England
- Died: 1853; Shrewsbury, England
- Occupations: Chemist and Druggist

Henry Blunt (14 November 1806 – 1853) was born in Southwark. He moved to Shrewsbury, Shropshire c. 1809 as a small child with his father, chemist Robert Blunt, mother Ann (Porter) Blunt and older brother, Thomas. The brothers later joined their father as Chemists and Druggists, as "Blunt and Sons" eventually adding a soda water manufactory, and later adding ginger beer. in the now sectioned 23 and 23a Wyle Cop address.

Henry Blunt also became a keen astronomer and talented watercolour artist.

In 1849 he constructed a model of the Moon's surface showing the lunar crater Eratosthenes. The model was based on observations made by Blunt with his reflecting telescope from his home in Shrewsbury. A full description of the model's presentation to the British Association for the Advancement of Science is published in the Report for their Meeting held in Birmingham during September 1849. One of several surviving models is held by the Science Museum, London and was donated to them by the Commissioners of the Great Exhibition. The model was displayed in 1851 at The Great Exhibition in London and is described in the exhibition catalogue.

The framed model says 1851…It may have been replicated for the 1851 world exposition. transcribed from the noted publication (5)...under notices and abstracts, in 1850: On a Model of the Moon's Surface, By Henry Blunt. This model is an accurate representation of a part of the Moon's surface as it appears through a Newtonian telescope of seven feet focus and nine-inch aperture, under a magnifying power of about 250. The large volcanic crater, which forms the principal object in the model, has received the name of Eratosthenes. It is about thirty miles in diameter and stands at the end of a lofty range of mountains not far from the centre of the Moon's disc. A hilly district, rising into two or three lofty peaks, runs upwards from Eratosthenes, connecting it with what appears to have been an ancient crater now filled up. Touching the edge of this crater and descending from it towards the right, may be seen a long line of minute volcanic cups, which are nearly the smallest objects visible with the instrument by which the observations were made. The whole is represented as seen with an inverting eye-piece, and the model ought to be held in an oblique light in order to view it to advantage.

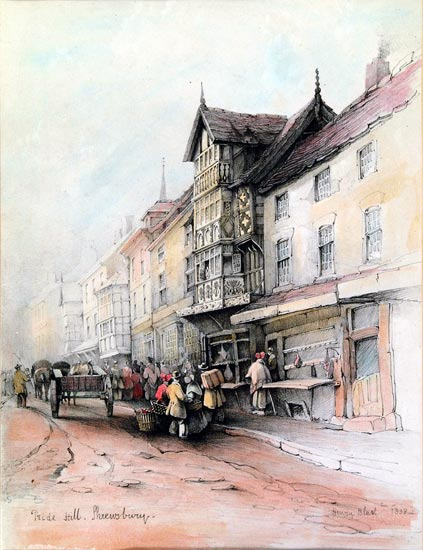
Watercolour of Pride Hill, Shrewsbury by Henry Blunt (1838)

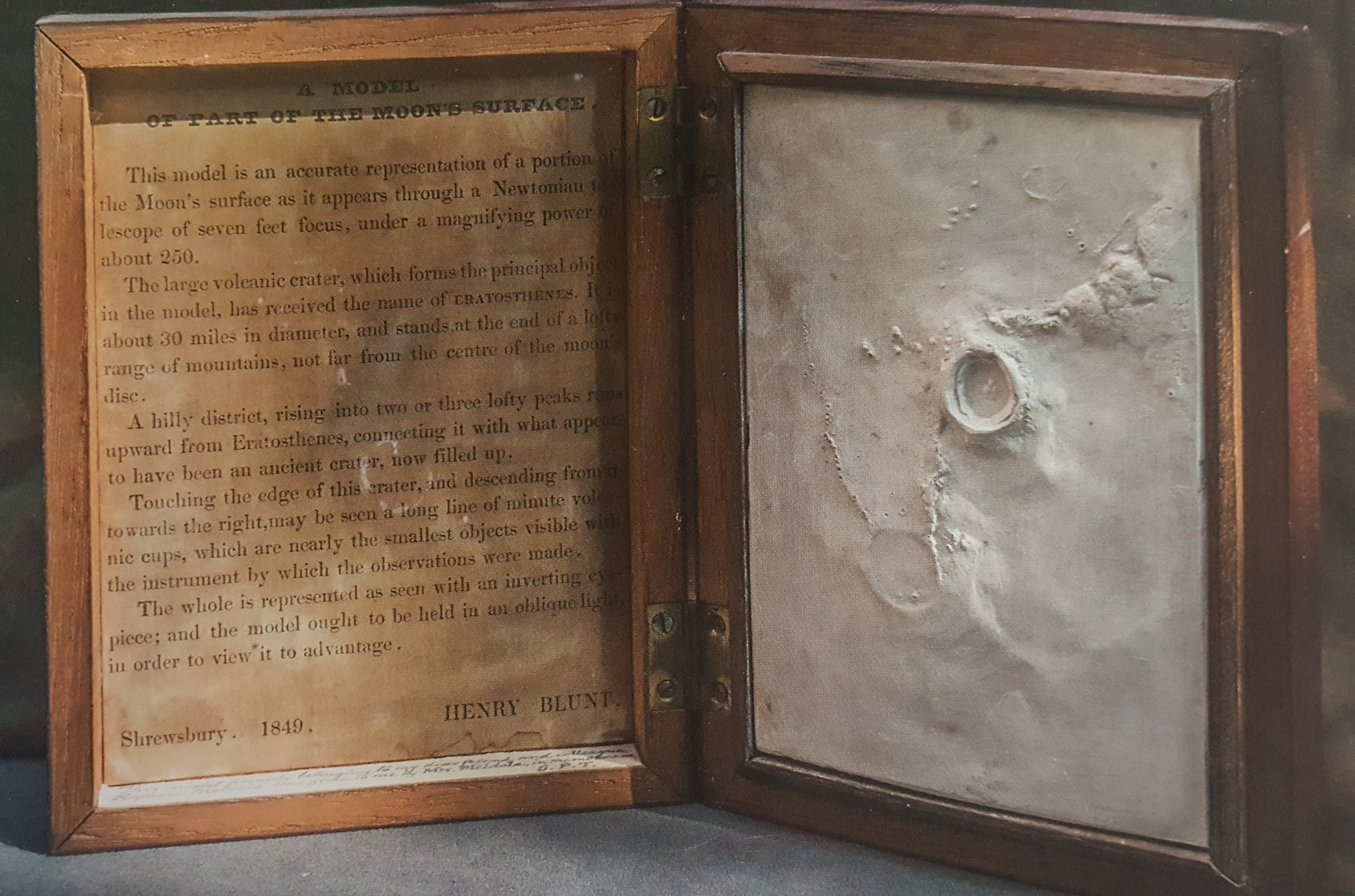
A model of the Moon crater Eratosthenes made by Henry Blunt

The collections of Shrewsbury Museum and Art Gallery and the British Museum include pictures that he painted in Shrewsbury, Shropshire and Wales.

Henry’s nephew John Henry Blunt ( son of Henry's half brother Robert, from father Robert’s first marriage ) describes the lunar surface in an 1872 publication Henry's daughter Agnes was also an artist and painter, and daughter Ellen M. Blunt an author of note. A few of their works can also be seen or referenced online.
