= Eratosthenes (crater) =

Crater on the Moon

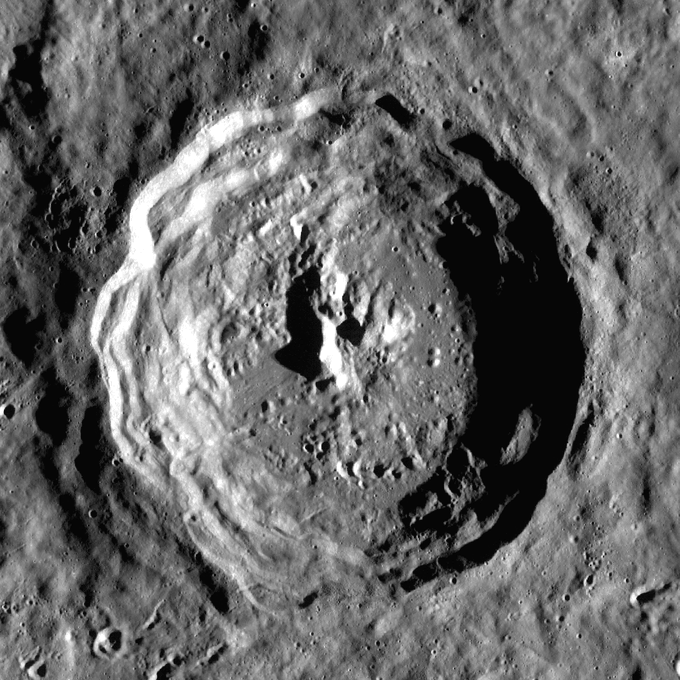
- Lunar Reconnaissance Orbiter image
- Coordinates: 14.47°N 11.32°W
- Diameter: 58.77 km (36.52 mi)
- Depth: 3.43 km (2.13 mi)
- Colongitude: 12° at sunrise
- Formation: Eratosthenian
- Eponym: Eratosthenes

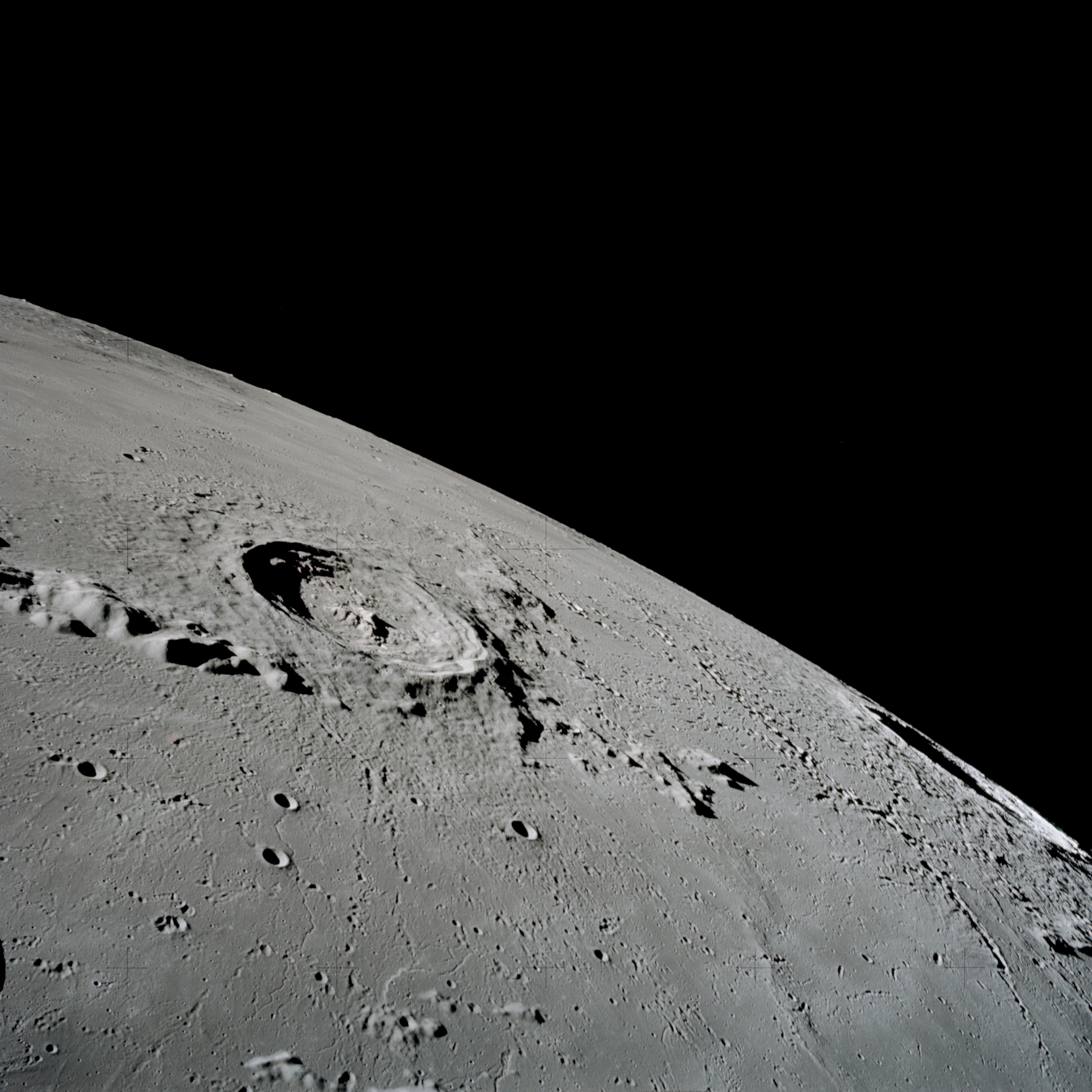
Eratosthenes (lower left of center) and surroundings from Apollo 17. NASA image.

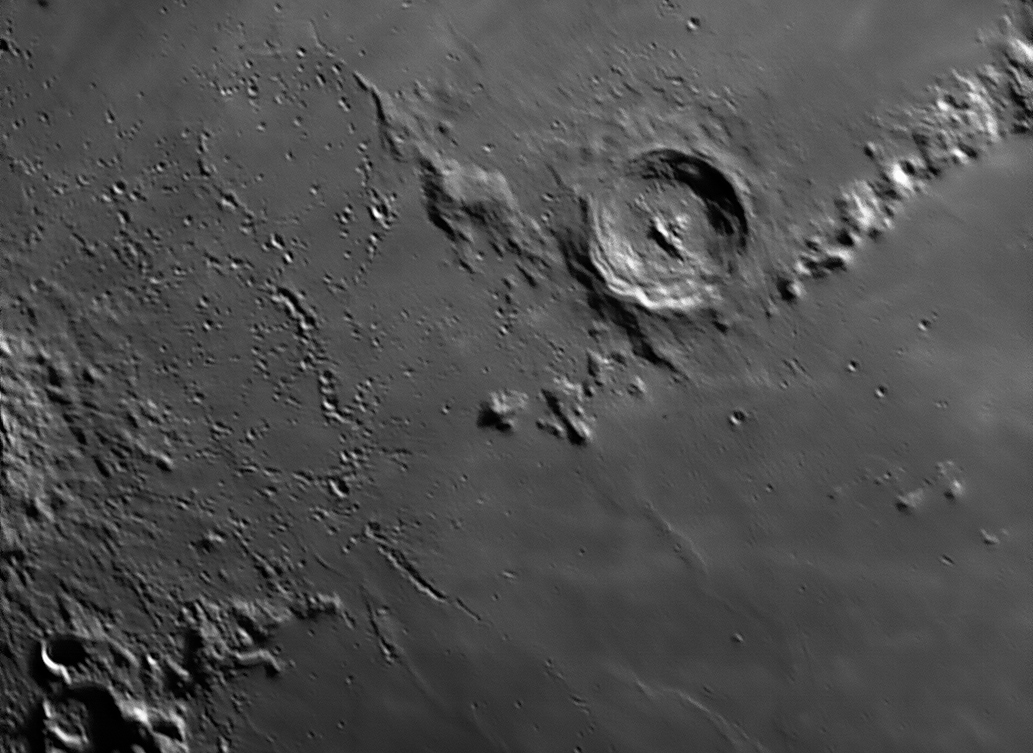
Eratosthenes crater. Photo taken from Earth. Author: Georgi Georgiev, Stara Zagora, Bulgaria.

Eratosthenes crater is a relatively deep lunar impact crater that lies on the boundary between the Mare Imbrium and Sinus Aestuum mare regions. T. W. Webb describes it as having "a widely-terraced wall of very irregular height; the surrounding ground is also very uneven". Patrick Moore calls it "one of the most perfect craters on the Moon." It forms the western terminus of the Montes Apenninus mountain range.

This formation is named after ancient Greek astronomer Eratosthenes of Cyrene (c. 276-196 B.C.), who estimated the circumference of the Earth, and the distance from the Earth to the Sun. His name was included in the lunar nomenclature of Italian astronomer Giovanni Battista Riccioli in 1651. Its designation was formally adopted by the International Astronomical Union in 1935.

== Description ==
This is an extremely deep crater, with a well-defined circular rim, terraced inner wall, central mountain peaks, an irregular floor, and an outer rampart of ejecta. The infrared spectrum of pure crystalline plagioclase has been identified on the central peak. This crater lacks a ray system of its own, but is overlain by rays from the prominent crater Copernicus to the south-west.

The Eratosthenian period in the lunar geological timescale is named after this crater, though it does not define the start of this time period. The crater is believed to have been formed about 3.2 billion years ago.

At low Sun-angles, this crater is prominent due to the shadow cast by the rim. When the Sun is directly overhead, however, Eratosthenes visually blends into the surroundings, and it becomes more difficult for an observer to locate it. The higher albedo of the rays from Copernicus serves as a form of camouflage.

In 1851 Shropshire Astronomer Henry Blunt constructed a model of the Moon's surface showing Eratosthenes. The model is based on observations made by Blunt with a reflecting telescope from his home in Shrewsbury and was displayed in the same year at the Great Exhibition, London.

From 1910 to the 1920s, William H. Pickering noted dark patches in the crater that varied in a regular manner over each lunar day. He first put forward the speculative idea that these patches appeared to migrate across the surface, suggestive of vegetation. Pickering believed that the Moon had a thicker atmosphere and reported seeing climatic variations such as frost and snow, leading him to refer to the crater as the "Gardens of Eratosthenes". Later his views would change, and he would come to believe that the vegetation was instead "swarms of animal life", which he often referred to as swarms of insects, or "lunar insects". The scientific community did not share his enthusiasm for these ideas, but they received a degree of attention in the popular press of the time primarily due to Pickering's reputation.

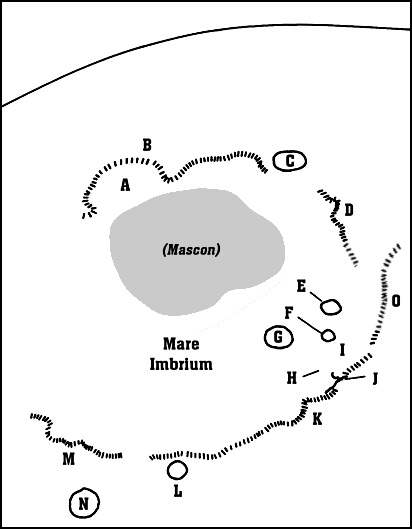
Detail map of Mare Imbrium's features. Eratosthenes is marked "L".

== Satellite craters ==
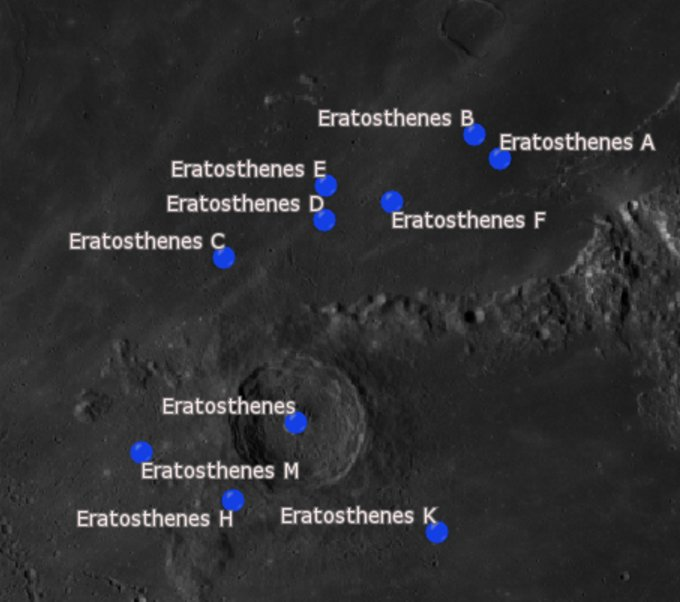
Eratosthenes and its satellite craters

By convention these features are identified on lunar maps by placing the letter on the side of the crater midpoint that is closest to Eratosthenes.

Eratosthenes	Coordinates	Diameter, km
A	18.34°N 8.33°W	5.7
B	18.70°N 8.70°W	5.3
C	16.89°N 12.39°W	5.2
D	17.44°N 10.90°W	3.8
E	17.93°N 10.89°W	3.8
F	17.69°N 9.91°W	4.0
H	13.31°N 12.25°W	3.5
K	12.85°N 9.26°W	4.3
M	14.02°N 13.59°W	3.5
Z	13.75°N 14.10°W	0.6
