= William Blount (disambiguation) =

William Blount (1749–1800) was an American statesman and land speculator.

William Blount may also refer to the:

In chronological order

- William Blount, Member of Parliament (MP) for Rutland in 1301
- William Blount, Member of Parliament for Derbyshire in 1468
- William Blount, 4th Baron Mountjoy (c. 1478–1534), English scholar
- William Blount (MP for Much Wenlock), in 1542, MP for Much Wenlock
- William Blount, 7th Baron Mountjoy (1561–1594), English peer
- Willie Blount (1768–1835), governor of Tennessee
- William Grainger Blount (1784–1827), American congressman
- William Blount (Totnes MP) (1799–?), English barrister and politician
- William B. Blount (born 1953), Alabama investment banker

== See also ==
- William Blunt (disambiguation)
- Blount (surname)
