= Richard Blount =

Richard Blount may refer to:

- Richard Blount (priest) (1565–1638), English priest and Jesuit
- Richard Blount (died 1556), Member of Parliament (MP) for Calais
- Sir Richard Blount (died 1564), MP for Steyning
- Richard Blount (died 1575), MP for Taunton
- Richard Blount (MP for Chipping Wycombe) (died 1628), MP for Chipping Wycombe
- Richard Blount (MP for Lymington) (died 1628), MP for Lymington

== See also ==
- Richard Blunt (disambiguation), same pronunciation
