= Undesigned coincidences =

Type of Christian apologetic argument

An undesigned coincidence is an argument used in Christian apologetics and philosophy of religion, that aims to support the historical reliability of the Biblical narratives. The argument holds that when two or more independent accounts of an event in the Bible contain interlocking details which complete one another, seemingly coincidentally, this is said to indicate that the accounts are based on genuine history and memories.

The term was popularized by Anglican theologian John James Blunt in 1847, who was building upon the previous arguments established by William Paley in his 1790 book Horae Paulinae. In contemporary apologetics and academic settings, the hypothesis has seen a modern revival through the work of Lydia and Timothy Mcgrew.

== Overview ==
According to this approach, advocates argue undesigned coincidences often occur when one account casually mentions a detail or actions without providing an explanation, while a different account provides the necessary context or explanation for that detail. Since the connection appears unplanned and "undesigned", so the argument goes, it suggests that both writers were drawing from an underlying historical event, rather than inventing details or copying from one another.

The argument was applied by Willian Paley to compare the Epistles of Paul with the Acts of the Apostles, arguing that details in Paul's letters matched those in Acts. John Blunt would expand this, and apply the same methodology for the Gospels.

== Claimed examples ==
Proponents point to a number of examples of their supposed occurrences. Around 47 are used in argumentation, including:

- The Blindfolding of Jesus: Matthew records the crowd striking Jesus and mocking him, without identifying why the attacker asked him to prophecy (Matthew 26:67-68). Luke supplies the missing context by noting that Jesus was blindfolded (Luke 22:64).
- The Feeding of the 5000: In John's text, Jesus asks Phillip where they can buy bread (John 6:5), and John indicates elsewhere that Phillip is from Bethsaida (John 12:21, John 1:44), while Luke independently notes that the feeding took place in Bethsaida (Luke 9:10).
- The Green Grass: Mark writes that Jesus commanded the crowds to sit on "green grass" (Mark 6:39), a seasonal detail he leaves unexplained. John mentions the "Passover was at hand" (John 6:4), which establishes a springtime setting when grass in Judea is green.
- Healing the Sick at Evening: Matthew notes that a crowd brought the sick and possessed to Jesus "when evening came" (Matthew 8:16). Parallel passages in Mark and Luke establish that day as the Sabbath (Mark 1:21; Luke 4:31), during which carrying heavy loads or performing healings was prohibited under Jewish law until sundown (Matthew 12:10).
- Mending the Nets: Matthew describes James and John as mending their nets by the Sea of Galilee before following Jesus (Matthew 4:21). Luke's narrative of the miraculous catch of fish provides the reason, noting that the sheer volume of fish had broken their nets (Luke 5:6).

== Reception and criticism ==
Mainstream scholarship generally rejects the hypothesis of undesigned coincidences, considering its central assumption of narrative intersections implying independent testimony as methodologically flawed. Critics argue that historical criticism, redaction criticism, and source criticism do not evaluate these connections as coincidences centered on the same factual event, but as being redactions coming from a shared literary tradition. Some of these examples of interdependence are indicated by the synoptic problem, with the Gospel writers using and changing their earlier textual sources. Another point of contention is with the authors use of Old Testament typology, where deliberate allusions are created.

Michael J. Alter critiques all specific examples as individual case studies; such as where Mark writes Jesus had a crowd sit on "green grass", while John notes "Passover was at hand". The claim is that Mark remembers the colour of the grass, while John remembers the season, an undesigned independent agreement. However, Alter argues that Mark is making an intentional echo to Psalm 23, and that this miracle is placed after the execution of John the Baptist ("the Elijah figure") deliberately mirroring 2 Kings 4, where Elisha performs a bread miracle after Elijah's departure. John's intent is to replace this for a Passover motif in "I am the bread of life". Alter also notes contradictions in time and location between the narratives, seeing this as creative theological reshaping.

Nonetheless, some conservative and Evangelical scholars like Craig S. Keener, as well as apologist J. Warner Wallace have shown appraisal and support for the contemporary popularization of the argument as bought forth by Lydia and Tim Mcgrew.
