= Mike Blabac (photographer) =

American photographer

Mike Blabac is an American photographer who has extensively photographed skateboarding since the mid-90s. As of 2009, Mike is the director of skateboarding photography for DC Shoes and also regularly contributed to Transworld Skateboarding.
