= William Paley =

English Christian philosopher (1743–1805)

The Reverend William Paley
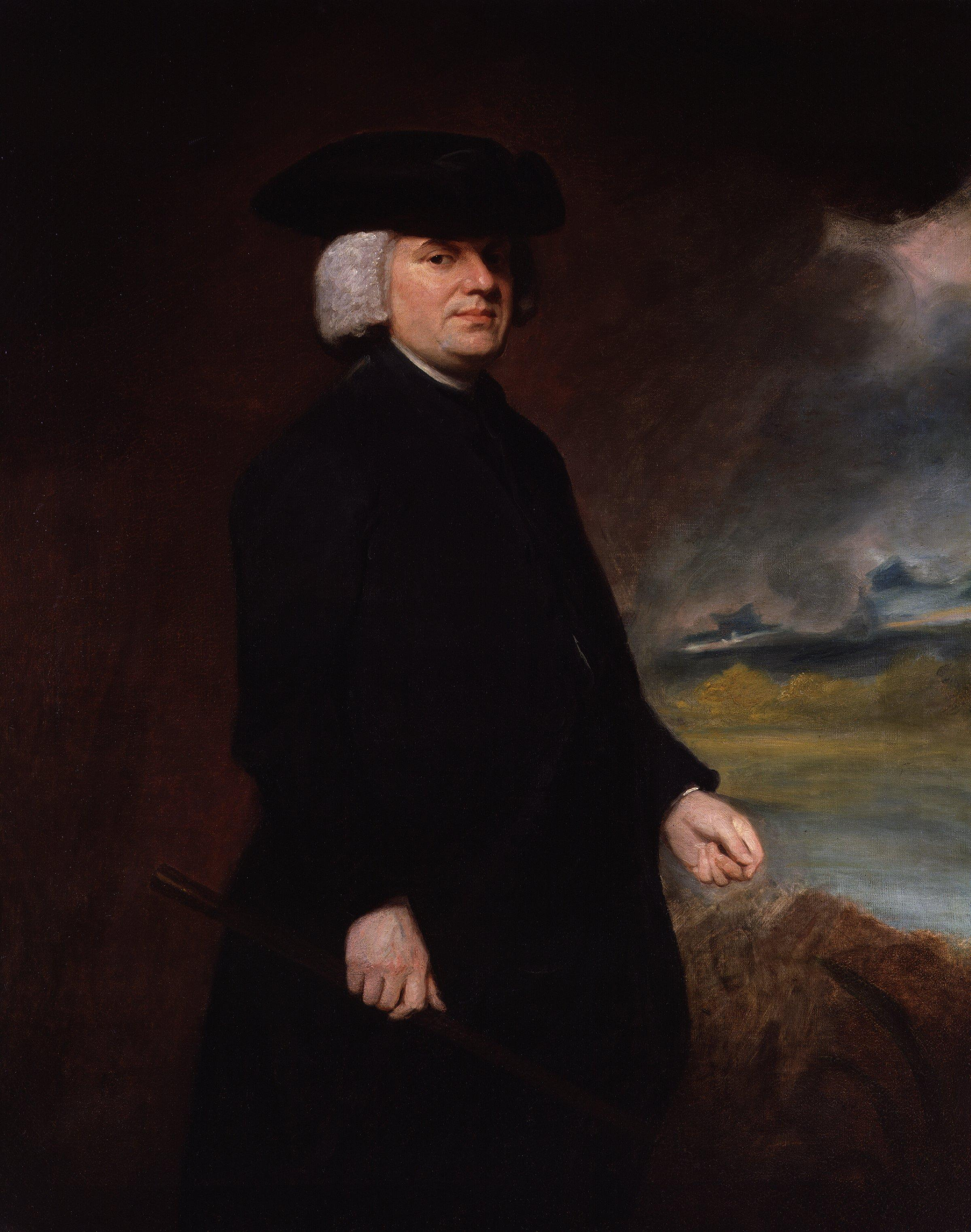
- Portrait by George Romney, 1789–1791
- Born: July 1743; Peterborough, Cambridgeshire, England
- Died: 25 May 1805 (aged 61); Bishopwearmouth, County Durham, England
- Education: Christ's College, Cambridge
- Known for: Natural theology exposition of the teleological argument for the existence of God; Watchmaker analogy
- Awards: Members' Prize, Cambridge (1765)
- Scientific career
- Fields: Moral philosophy, political philosophy, philosophy of religion
- Workplaces: Giggleswick Grammar School, Christ's College, Cambridge, Giggleswick Parish, Carlisle Cathedral, Lincoln Cathedral, Durham Cathedral

William Paley (July 1743 – 25 May 1805) was an English Anglican clergyman, philosopher, abolitionist and utilitarian. He was at times referred to as a Christian apologist by his critics. He is best known for his natural theology exposition of the teleological argument for the existence of God in his 1802 work Natural Theology or Evidences of the Existence and Attributes of the Deity, which made use of the watchmaker analogy.

== Life ==
Paley was born in Peterborough, Northamptonshire, England, and was educated at Giggleswick School, of which his father, also called William, was headmaster for half a century, and, like his father and great-uncle, at Christ's College, Cambridge. He graduated in 1763 as senior wrangler and became fellow in 1766, and in 1768 tutor of his college. He lectured on Samuel Clarke, Joseph Butler and John Locke in his systematic course on moral philosophy, which subsequently formed the basis of his Principles of Moral and Political Philosophy; and on the New Testament, his own copy of which is in the British Library. The subscription controversy was then agitating the university, and Paley pushed an anonymous defence of a pamphlet in which the Master of Peterhouse and Bishop of Carlisle Edmund Law had advocated the retrenchment and simplification of the Thirty-nine Articles; he did not, however, sign the petition (called the "Feathers Tavern" petition from the place in which it was agreed) for a relaxation of the terms of subscription to the Articles. He was also a strong supporter of the American colonies during the Revolutionary War, partly because he thought that it would lead to the destruction of slavery. He studied philosophy.

In 1776, Paley was presented to the rectory of Musgrave in Westmorland, which was exchanged soon after for Appleby. He was subsequently made vicar of Dalston in 1780, near the bishop's palace at Rose Castle. In 1782, he became the Archdeacon of Carlisle. Paley was intimate with the Law family throughout his life, and the Bishop and his son John Law (who was later an Irish bishop) were instrumental during the decade after he left Cambridge in pressing him to publish his revised lectures and in negotiating with the publisher. In 1782, Edmund Law, otherwise the mildest of men, was most particular that Paley should add a book on political philosophy to the moral philosophy, which Paley was reluctant to write. The book was published in 1785 under the title of The Principles of Moral and Political Philosophy, and was made a part of the examinations at the University of Cambridge the next year. It passed through fifteen editions in the author's lifetime. Paley strenuously supported the abolition of the slave trade, and his attack on slavery in the book was instrumental in drawing greater public attention to the practice. In 1789, a speech that he gave on the subject in Carlisle was published.

The Principles was followed in 1790 by his first essay in the field of Christian apologetics, Horae Paulinae, or the Truth of the Scripture History of St Paul which compared Paul's Epistles with the Acts of the Apostles, making use of "undesigned coincidences" to argue that these documents mutually supported each other's authenticity. Some have said this book was the most original of Paley's works. It was followed in 1794 by the celebrated View of the Evidences of Christianity, which was also added to the examinations at Cambridge, remaining on the syllabus until the 1920s.

For his services in defence of the faith, with the publication of the Evidences, the Bishop of London gave him a stall in St Paul's, the Bishop of Lincoln made him subdean of that cathedral and the Bishop of Durham conferred upon him the rectory of Bishopwearmouth. During the remainder of Paley's life, his time was divided between Bishopwearmouth and Lincoln, and he wrote Natural Theology: or, Evidences of the Existence and Attributes of the Deity despite his increasingly debilitating illness. He died on 25 May 1805 and is buried in Carlisle Cathedral with his two wives.

Among his grandsons were the classical scholar Frederick Apthorp Paley (1815–1888) and his brother the architect Edward Graham Paley (1823–1895), sons of the Rev. Edmund Paley (1782–1850).

== Thought ==
Paley's Principles of Moral and Political Philosophy was one of the most influential philosophical texts in late Enlightenment Britain. It was cited in several parliamentary debates over the Corn Laws in Britain and in debates in the US Congress. The book remained a set textbook at Cambridge well into the Victorian era. Charles Darwin, as a student of theology, was required to read it when he did his undergraduate studies at Christ's College, but it was Paley's Natural Theology that most impressed Darwin even though it was not a set book for undergraduates. Portraits of Paley and Darwin face each other at Christ's College to this day.

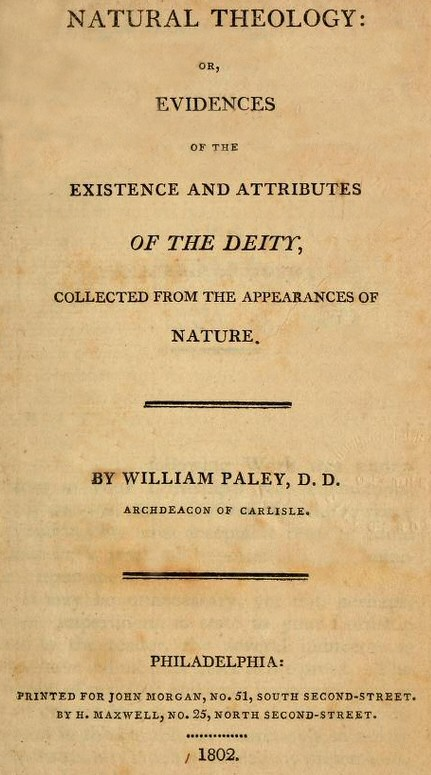
Title Page of William Paley's Natural Theology or Evidences of the Existence and Attributes of the Deity, 1802

Paley is also remembered for his contributions to the philosophy of religion, utilitarian ethics and Christian apologetics. In 1802, near the end of his life, he published Natural Theology; or, Evidences of the Existence and Attributes of the Deity, his last book. As he states in the preface, he saw the book as a preamble to his other philosophical and theological books; in fact, he suggests that Natural Theology should be read first to build a systematic understanding of his arguments. The main thrust of his argument was that God's design of the whole creation could be seen in the general happiness, or well-being, that was evident in the physical and social order of things. Such a book fell within the broad tradition of natural theology works written during the Enlightenment; and this explains why Paley based much of his thought on John Ray (1691), William Derham (1711) and Bernard Nieuwentyt (1750).

Paley's argument is built mainly around anatomy and natural history. "For my part", he notes, "I take my stand in human anatomy"; elsewhere, he insists upon "the necessity, in each particular case, of an intelligent designing mind for the contriving and determining of the forms which organized bodies bear". In making his argument, Paley employed a wide variety of metaphors and analogies. Perhaps the most famous is his analogy between a watch and the world. Historians, philosophers and theologians often call this the Watchmaker analogy. Building on that mechanical analogy, Paley presents examples from planetary astronomy and argues that the regular movements of the Solar System resemble the workings of a giant clock To bolster his views, he cites the work of his old friend John Law and the Dublin Astronomer Royal John Brinkley.

The germ of the idea is to be found in ancient writers who used sundials and Ptolemaic epicycles to illustrate the divine order of the world. Those types of examples can be seen in the work of the ancient philosopher Cicero, especially in his De natura deorum, ii. 87 and 97. The watch analogy was widely used in the Enlightenment, by deists and Christians alike. Thus, Paley's use of the watch (and other mechanical objects like it) continued a long and fruitful tradition of analogical reasoning that was well received by those who read Natural Theology when it was published in 1802. The Edinburgh Review, for example, said "As a collection of striking facts and powerful arguments for the existence of a wise and beneficent Creator, this publication is certainly entitled to a very favourable reception.... Dr. Paley's chief excellence consists in the judicious disposition of his forces, and the skill and confidence with which he has extended his array to every point which atheism had affected to menace."

== Legacy ==
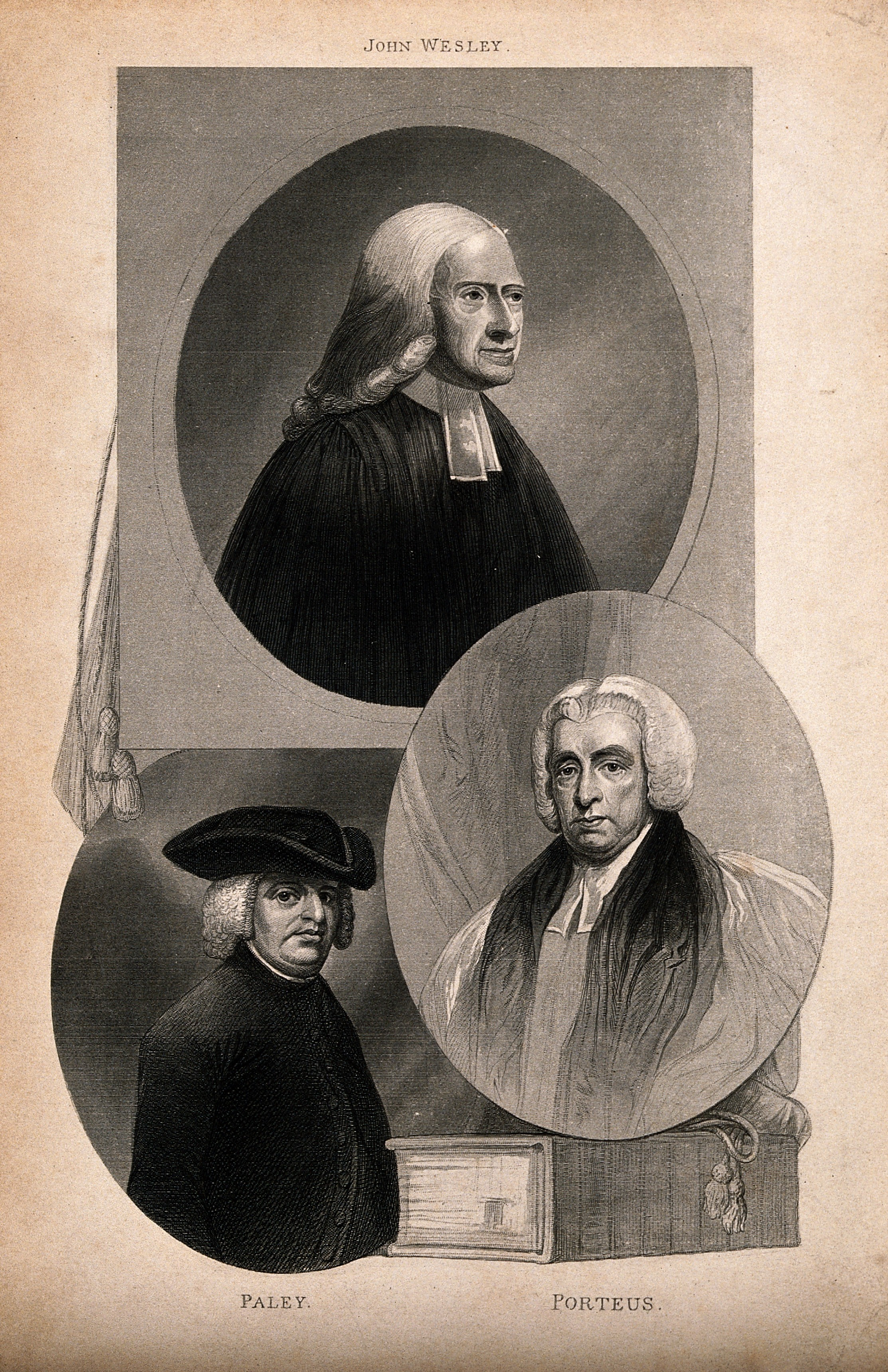
Three churchmen: John Wesley, William Paley, and Beilby Porteus. A posthumous engraving.

Since Paley is often read in university courses that address the philosophy of religion, the timing of his design argument has sometimes perplexed modern philosophers. Earlier in the century David Hume had argued against notions of design with counter examples drawn from monstrosity, imperfect forms of testimony and probability (see watchmaker analogy). Hume's arguments, however, were not widely accepted by most of the reading public and they fell 'stillborn' (to use Hume's own assessment) from the press. Despite Hume's unpopularity, Paley's published works and in manuscript letters show that he engaged directly with Hume from his time as an undergraduate to his last works. Paley's works were more influential than Hume's from the 1800s to the 1840s. Hume's arguments were only accepted gradually by the reading public, and his philosophical works sold poorly until agnostics like Thomas Huxley championed Hume's philosophy in the late 19th century.

Scientific norms have changed greatly since Paley's day, and are inclined to do less than justice to his arguments and ways of reasoning. But his style is lucid and he was willing to present transparently the evidence against his own case. The design argument has also been applied in other fields of scientific and philosophical inquiry, notably in regards to anthropic cosmological fine-tuning, fine-tuning for discoverability and the origin of life. His subject matter was central to Victorian anxieties, which might be one reason Natural Theology continued to appeal to the reading public, making his book a best seller for most of the 19th century, even after the publication of Darwin's Origin of Species in 1859. Natural Theology and the Evidences of Christianity appealed to Victorian Evangelicals, although not so much to adherents of the Oxford Movement – and both found his utilitarianism objectionable. Paley's views influenced (both positively and negatively) theologians, philosophers and scientists, then and since.

In addition to Moral and Political Philosophy and the Evidences, Charles Darwin read Natural Theology during his student years, and later stated in his autobiography that he was initially convinced by the argument. His views changed with time. By the 1820s and 1830s, well-known liberals like Thomas Wakley and other radical editors of The Lancet were using Paley's ageing examples to attack the establishment's control over medical and scientific education in Durham, London, Oxford and Cambridge. It also inspired the Earl of Bridgewater to commission the Bridgewater Treatises and the Society for the Promotion of Christian Knowledge to issue cheap reprints for the rising middle class. But whereas Paley's natural theology was disassembled or rebuilt by intellectuals like Wakley or the Bridgewater authors, the core of argument retained an ongoing popularity with the reading public and served as the basis of many catechisms and textbooks that were used in Britain and its colonies until World War II when, as argued by Matthew Daniel Eddy, the existential morass of World War I undermined the moral teleology that had underpinned natural theology since the Enlightenment.

Today, Paley's name evokes both reverence and revulsion and his work is cited accordingly by authors seeking to frame their own views of design. Even Richard Dawkins, an opponent of the design argument, described himself as a neo-Paleyan in The Blind Watchmaker. Today, as in his own time (though for different reasons), Paley is a controversial figure, a lightning rod for both sides in the contemporary argument between creationism and evolutionary biology. His writings reflect the thought of his time, but as Dawkins observed, his was a strong and logical approach to evidence, whether human or natural. Perhaps this explains why the Oxford constitutional theorist A. V. Dicey had his pupils read the Evidences to teach them about legal reasoning. It is for such reasons that Paley's writings, Natural Theology included, stand as a notable body of work in the canon of Western thought.

== Works ==
- The Principles of Moral and Political Philosophy, 1785
- Horae Paulinae, or the Truth of the Scripture History of St Paul, 1790
- View of the Evidences of Christianity, 1794
- Natural Theology or Evidences of the Existence and Attributes of the Deity

== See also ==
- List of abolitionist forerunners
- Langcliffe
- Giggleswick School
- Frederick Apthorp Paley (1815–1888)
- Edward Graham Paley (1823–1895)
- Henry Anderson Paley (1859–1946)
- Sharpe, Paley and Austin
- Alexander George Victor Paley (Sir Victor Paley, KBE, CB, DSO, DL) (1903–1976) [descent from uncle George (1708–1765)]
- Bowling Iron Works [descent from uncle George (1708–1765)]
- Ampton Hall [descent from uncle George (1708–1765)]
