= John Blount =

John Blount may refer to:

== Politicians ==
- John Blount (died 1417), MP for Dorchester (UK Parliament constituency)
- John Blount (died 1425), MP for Worcestershire (UK Parliament constituency)
- John Blount (died 1531), MP for Shropshire

== Others ==
- John Blount, 3rd Baron Mountjoy (c. 1450 – 1485), English peer and soldier
- John Blount, scholar (active 1511 – 1538), Fellow of All Souls College, Oxford
- Jeb Blount (born 1954), American football quarterback

== See also ==
- John Blunt (disambiguation)
- Blount (surname)
