= Thomas Blount (colonist) =

Colonial North Carolina public official

Captain Thomas Blount
- Image of Capt. Thomas Blount circa 1680

Member of the North Carolina Assembly
- In office 1702–1703
- In office 1696–1697

Member of the North Carolina Council
- In office 1696–1696

Magistrate of the Chowan County Precinct Court
- In office 1694–1695

Personal details
- Born: 1655 Isle of Wight County, Virginia, Colonial North America
- Died: 28 March 1706 (aged 50–51) Cabin Ridge Plantation, Albemarle County, North Carolina, Colonial North America
- Spouse: Mary Perry
- Children: 10
- Parent(s): James Blount (colonist); Elizabeth Wylde
- Occupation: planter, magistrate, militia officer, politician

Military service
- Rank: Captain (North Carolina Militia)
- Battles/wars: Culpeper's Rebellion

Captain Thomas Blount was an American officer, politician, and planter in colonial North Carolina. He served in the North Carolina Assembly and served as a Magistrate for Chowan County. He and his father James Blount participated and were rebels in Culpeper's Rebellion, one of the earliest instances of open defiance of British crown rule in America.

== Early Life & Family ==
Thomas Blount was born in 1655 to James Blount (colonist) and Elizabeth Wylde. He married his wife Mary Perry in 1685 and the two of them would have 10 children together.

== Political Career ==
He first appears in surviving records as presiding justice of the Chowan County Precinct Court in 1694, a position that placed him at the center of local judicial administration. In 1696, he was appointed to the North Carolina Council, the governor's advisory board and the colony's upper legislative chamber. He also represented his precinct in the colonial North Carolina Assembly around 1696 and again about 1703, participating in the lower house that drafted legislation and managed taxation. In October 1701, however, the General Court barred him from holding further civil or military office due to controversy surrounding his support of his son's marriage, which violated prevailing Anglican canon law. Despite this disqualification, Blount remained active in local religious and community affairs, serving as a vestryman of St. Paul's Parish until his death.

== Legacy ==
His descendants became influential in Bath County, North Carolina and later eastern North Carolina. The Blount family remained active in politics, landholding, and local governance for generations, helping shape the region's early development.
