= W. Frank Blount =

American businessman

W. Frank Blount AM
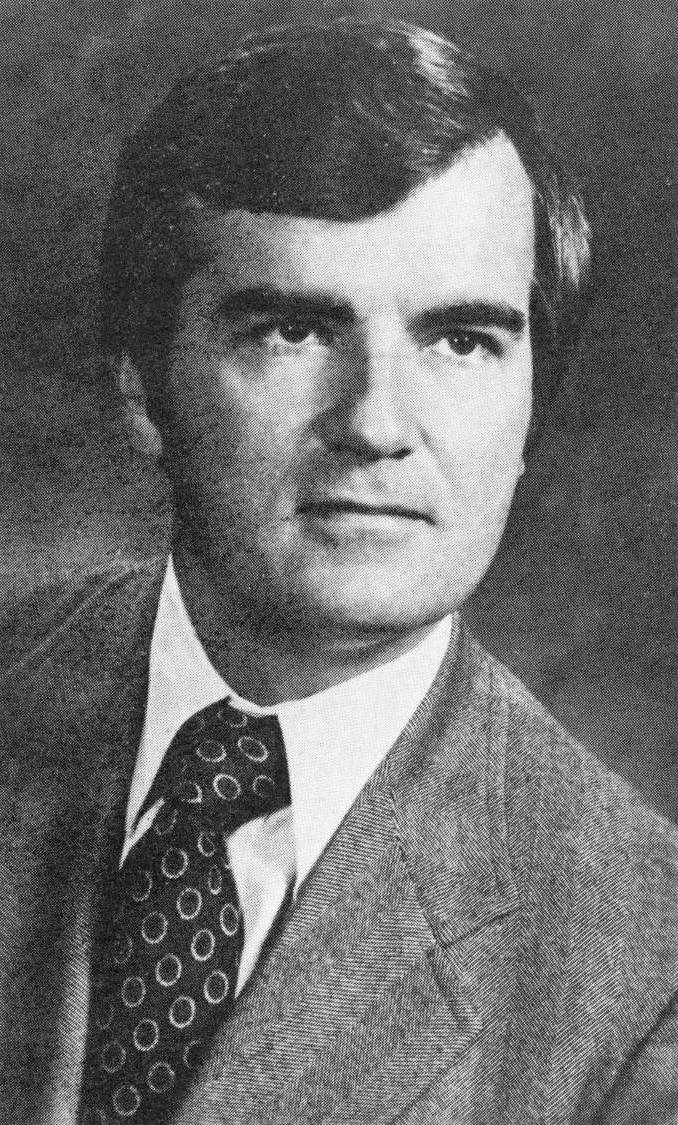
- Blount circa 1982
- Born: William Frank Blount; July 26, 1938 (age 88); Columbus, Georgia, U.S.
- Education: Georgia Tech (BS); Georgia State University (MBA); Massachusetts Institute of Technology (SM)
- Occupation: Businessman

William Frank Blount, AM (born July 26, 1938) is an American businessman, and the chairman and CEO of venture capital firm JI Ventures, Inc. Blount was chairman and CEO of Cypress Communications Inc., and director and CEO of Telstra Corporation Limited in Australia.

== Early life and education ==
Blount received a B.S. in Electrical Engineering from the Georgia Institute of Technology in 1961, an M.B.A. from Georgia State University in 1969, and a SM (master's degree) in Management Science from the MIT Sloan School of Management in 1971.

== Career ==
From 1993 to 1999 Blount was Chief Executive Officer of Telstra Corporation in Australia. He was previously Group President of AT&T Corp. In June 1999 he was appointed an Honorary Member of the Order of Australia (AM), "for service to business, particularly as the Chief Executive Officer of Telstra".

In 1999, Blount became affiliated with The Jordan Company, L.P., a private investment firm that specializes in buying and building businesses in partnership with management.

Blount is a director of Caterpillar Inc., Entergy Corporation, Hanson plc, ADTRAN and Alcatel-Lucent.
