= James Blount (colonist) =

Colonial North Carolina public official

Captain James Blount

Member of the Rebel North Carolina Assembly
- In office 1677–1678

Personal details
- Born: 1620 Astley, Worcestershire, Kingdom of England
- Died: 17 July 1686 (aged 65–66) Mulberry Hill, Edenton, Chowan County, North Carolina
- Spouse: Elizabeth Wylde
- Children: 5, including Thomas Blount (magistrate)
- Occupation: planter, settler, militia officer, politician

Military service
- Rank: Captain (North Carolina Militia)
- Battles/wars: Culpeper's Rebellion

Captain James Blount was an American officer, politician, and planter in colonial North Carolina. He served in the rebel North Carolina Assembly during Culpeper's Rebellion. It was one of the earliest instances of open defiance of British crown rule in America.

== Early life & Family ==
James John Blount was born in 1620 to James Blount and Anne Clare. His grandparents were landowners in England, having some considerable level of wealth. He married his wife Elizabeth Wylde in 1646 and they would go on to have 5 children, including his son Thomas Blount (magistrate).

== Culpeper's Rebellion ==
As a prominent landowner and militia captain in the Albemarle region, Blount opposed the proprietary officials’ enforcement of tobacco taxes and trade regulations imposed by the Lords Proprietors. During the rebellion, he served on the rebel council, which temporarily governed the colony after the proprietary governor and customs officers were expelled. Although the uprising did not challenge English rule itself, it demonstrated the settlers’ willingness to resist perceived abuses by the proprietary government.

== Later life & Legacy ==
Following the rebellion, James Blount was restored to official positions, including membership on the Albemarle Council and service as a justice of the county court. He died in Edenton, North Carolina, aged 65-66.
