= Edward Blount (disambiguation) =

Edward Blount may refer to:

- Edward Blount (1565–1632), English publisher
- Edward Blount, 2nd Baron Mountjoy (1464–1475), English peer
- Edward Blount (MP) (1769–1843), Member of Parliament for Steyning
- Edward Charles Blount (1809–1905), English promoter of French railways
- Sir Edward Blount, 4th Baronet (died 1758) of the Blount baronets
- Sir Edward Blount, 5th Baronet (c. 1724–1765) of the Blount baronets
- Sir Edward Blount, 8th Baronet (1795–1881) of the Blount baronets
- Sir Edward Robert Blount, 11th Baronet (1884–1978) of the Blount baronets

== See also ==
- Edward Blunt (disambiguation)
