= Christopher Stringer =

British industrial designer

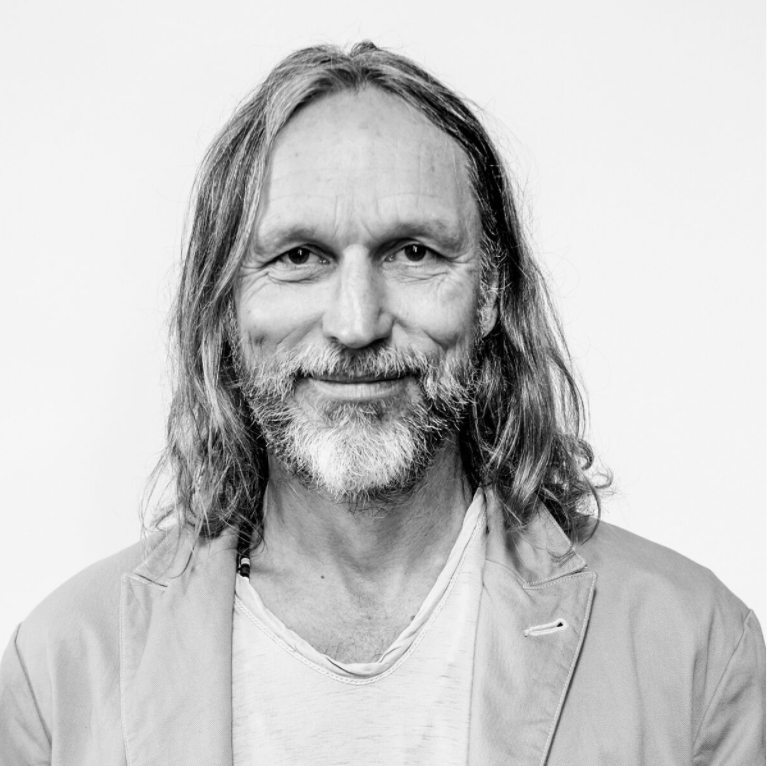
Stringer in 2019

Christopher Stringer (born 9 March 1965) is an industrial designer, formerly of Apple. During his 22 years at Apple (1995–2017), he contributed to the design of the PowerBook, iMac, iPod, iPhone, iPad, MacBook, Apple Watch, Apple Pencil, HomePod, USB-C. He currently holds over 1,400 patents, and was the key industrial design witness for Apple during the Apple vs. Samsung trial in 2012. In 2018 he founded audio brand Syng, where he is the Founder and Chief Design Officer.

== Early life and education ==
Christopher Stringer was born 9 March 1965 in Australia, to English parents, who moved back to England in 1970, initially to the North West of England, then as a teenager to Stourbridge in the West Midlands, where he attended Redhill Secondary School, followed by King Edward VI Sixth Form College to do A levels until 1983. In 1986 he graduated from North Staffordshire Polytechnic and earned an industrial design BA (Hons) degree. He then moved to London in 1986 to attend the Royal College of Art, where he graduated with a Master of Design degree in 1988. In 2017 he left Apple to pursue new interests.
