= Blount County =

Blount County is the name of two counties in the United States:

- Blount County, Alabama
- Blount County, Tennessee
