= Michael Blount =

16th-century English politician

Sir Michael Blount (c. 1530–1610) was a Tudor and Jacobean royal official and politician.

== Early years ==
Michael was born in Mapledurham House, Oxfordshire, the son of Sir Richard Blount (1505–1564; Lieutenant of the Tower 1558–1564) and his wife, Elizabeth, the daughter of Lord Chief Justice Sir Richard Lister, Chief Baron of the Exchequer.

== Career ==
Sir Michael was High Sheriff of Buckinghamshire in 1576, then of Oxfordshire in 1586 and 1597. He was elected the Member of Parliament for Winchelsea in March 1553 and Marlborough in 1563.

He succeeded Sir Owen Hopton of Cockfield Hall in Suffolk as Lieutenant of the Tower of London in 1590 and held the post for five years until 1595, in December of which year he was briefly imprisoned in the Tower himself. He and his father are buried at St Peter ad Vincula in the Tower, with a fine monument.

== Family life ==
He married Mary Moore (died 23 December 1592; sister of Thomas Moore of Bicester), and they had 11 children:

- Catherine Blount (11 April 1563 – ?) who married Sir John Croke, Speaker of the English House of Commons
- Sir Richard Blount of Mapledurham (28 June 1564 – 22 November 1619)
- Maria (15 November 1565 – ?)
- Thomas (27 April 1567 – ?)
- Charles (5 November 1568 – 1600)
- Frances (23 February 1569 – ?)
- Henry (17 August 1572 – ?)
- Robert (3 February 1573 – ?)
- Elizabeth (dsp)
- Anna (dsp)
- Elizabeth (28 July 1574 – ?)

Political offices
Preceded by Griffith Hampden	High Sheriff of Buckinghamshire; 1577–1578	Succeeded by Robert Drury
