= Mountjoy Blount, 1st Earl of Newport =

English courtier and politician

The Right Honourable The Earl of Newport
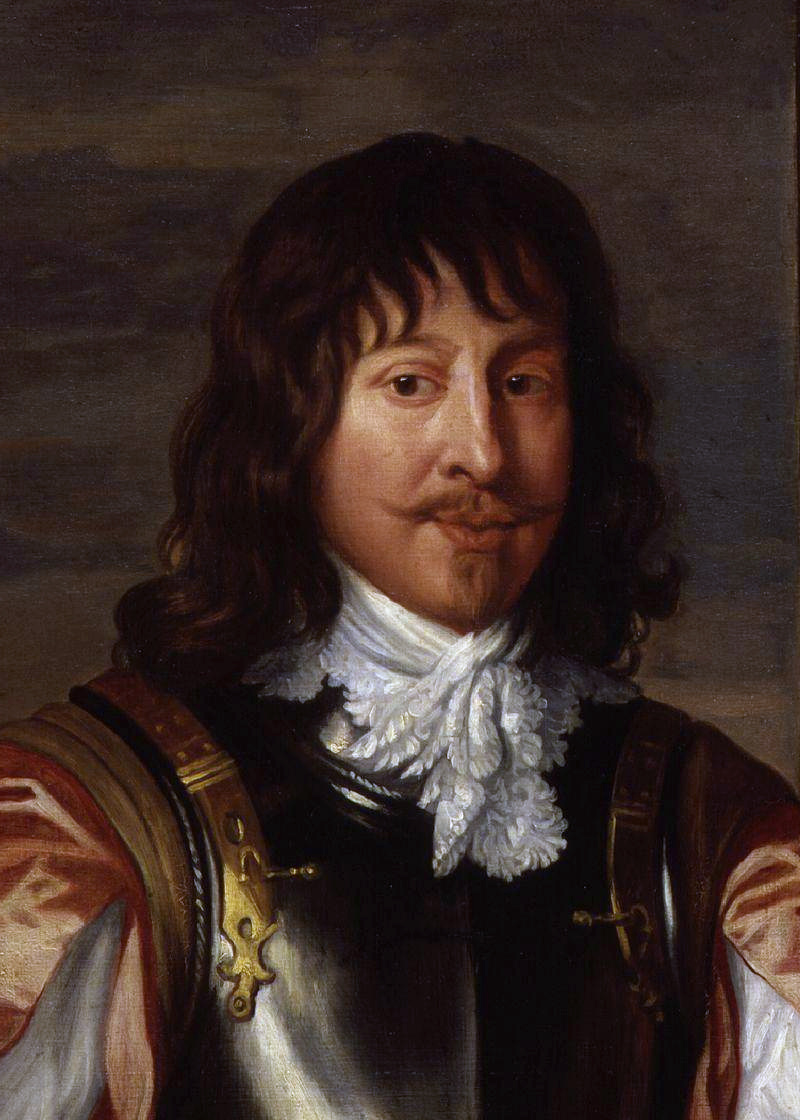
- The Earl of Newport: detail from a double portrait with Baron Goring by Sir Anthony van Dyck.

Master-General of the Ordnance
- In office 1634–1642

Personal details
- Born: c. 1597 London
- Died: 12 February 1666 (aged 68) St Aldate's, Oxford
- Resting place: Christ Church, Oxford
- Spouse: Anne Boteler (1627-his death)
- Children: 8, including Mountjoy, Thomas, Henry
- Parent(s): Charles Blount, 8th Baron Mountjoy; Penelope Rich
- Occupation: Courtier and politician

Military service
- Battles/wars: Anglo-French War (1627–1629); St Martin-de-Ré Wars of the Three Kingdoms; Newburn; Second Battle of Newbury;

Mountjoy Blount, 1st Earl of Newport (c. 1597 – 12 February 1666), was an English courtier and politician who held a number of positions under Charles I of England and supported the Royalists in the First English Civil War.

== Personal details ==
Mountjoy Blount was born circa 1597, one of four children born to Charles Blount, 8th Baron Mountjoy, (1563–1606) and his partner Penelope Rich, Lady Rich (1563–1607). His mother was married to Robert Rich, 1st Earl of Warwick; they separated shortly before Mountjoy was born, although they did not get divorced until 1605. Penelope was a sister of the Earl of Essex, executed for treason in 1601, making Blount a cousin to future Parliamentarian general Robert Devereux, 3rd Earl of Essex.

This made Blount half-brother to Robert Rich, 2nd Earl of Warwick (1587–1658), and Henry Rich, 1st Earl of Holland (1590–1649). He also had three full brothers and sisters, Penelope (1592–?), Isabella, and Charles (1605–1627); almost certainly fathered by Charles Mountjoy, these children were brought up within the Rich family and appear in its pedigree, with the exception of Mountjoy, who was legitimised after his father's death.

On 7 February 1627, he married Anne Boteler, a niece of George Villiers, 1st Duke of Buckingham, a close friend and favourite of Charles I. They had five children who survived into adulthood; Isabella (1630–1655), Anne (1637–1651?), Mountjoy Blount, 2nd Earl of Newport (1630–1675), Thomas Blount, 3rd Earl of Newport (1637–1675), and Henry Blount, 4th Earl of Newport (1640–1679). All three of his sons died without children, allegedly because they were mentally disabled. Thomas Porter abducted, on 24 February 1655, Anne Blount, daughter of Mountjoy Blount, 1st Earl of Newport. For this, he was for a short time imprisoned, and the contract of marriage was declared null and void by the quarter sessions of Middlesex on 17 July following. A valid marriage subsequently took place, and they had a son George Porter (1659–1728).

== Career ==
Blount became a member of James I's court, where he was something of a royal favourite, who played in a masque before the king mounted by James Hay, 1st Earl of Carlisle, at Essex House on 8 January 1620/1621. He was part of the entourage that accompanied Carlisle on a diplomatic mission to Louis XIII after the passage of Prince Charles through Paris incognito on his way to Spain at the time of negotiations towards the ill-starred "Spanish Match".

== Earl of Newport ==
In July 1627, he was created Earl of Newport in the Isle of Wight; Newport, as he now was, took part in the Siege of Saint-Martin-de-Ré in 1627 but was captured at the Battle of Pont du Feneau on 8 November. He was, however, released soon after. He held a rear-admiral's command in the ineffective expedition to relieve La Rochelle in August 1628, for which he was petitioning for payment in the following years. His appointment as Master of Ordnance for his lifetime was granted on 31 August 1634; as was expected in the seventeenth century, he derived a tidy fortune from the position. From his sale of gunpowder at exorbitant prices, through the Spanish ambassador, to supply the Spanish fleet attacking Dutch forces in September 1639, he pocketed £1000, and the King, £5000.

By his own account, he bargained with the ambassador to land soldiers from the Spanish fleet at Dunkirk, at thirty shillings a head, though public neutrality had been enjoined by Charles. His relatives, the Rich-Devereux clan, were identified with the Parliamentary opposition in the 1630s. Although at Christmas 1639, Newport participated with the King in the extravagant masque on the theme of Philogenes, royal "lover of the People", with the return of the Long Parliament the next year, Newport by degrees joined the forces of opposition in the House of Lords.

The turning point came during the trial of Strafford in 1641, when Col. Lord Goring had revealed to Newport an amateurish plot of Royalist officers at Portsmouth to take London by surprise, seize the Tower and somehow rescue the king. Goring betrayed the plot to Newport, who passed on the information to John Pym, who brought it forward at the most dramatic and opportune moment, sealing Strafford's fate in the bill of attainder.

When the First English Civil War began in August 1642, Newport served in the Royalist army, and took part in the second battle of Newbury in 1644. In January 1646 he was taken prisoner and confined in London on parole. He played little part in public affairs thereafter. After the Restoration of Charles II in 1660, he regained some of his old influence, but age and ill health were taking their toll.

On 12 February 1666, he died at St Aldate's Church, Oxford, where he had gone to avoid the Great Plague of London, and was buried in Christ Church, Oxford.

== Coat of arms ==
Coat of arms of Mountjoy Blount, 1st Earl of Newport
Coronet A coronet of an Earl Crest Out of a ducal coronet or, a crescent gold. Escutcheon Barry nebuly of six or and sable within a bordure conpony argent and gules. Supporters Two knights in complete armor proper collared, belted, and pommels and hilts of swords or.

== Sources ==
- Chisholm, Hugh, ed. (1911). "Mountjoy, Barons and Viscounts" . Encyclopædia Britannica. Vol. 18 (11th ed.). Cambridge University Press. p. 941. s.v. "Mountjoy Blount"
- Stephen, Leslie, ed. (1886). "Blount, Mountjoy" . Dictionary of National Biography. Vol. 5. London: Smith, Elder & Co.
- Madden, Frederic; Bandinel, Bulkeley, eds. (1840). Collectanea topographica et genealogica, Volume 6. John Bowyer Nichols and Son.
- Smith, David L. (2004). "Blount, Mountjoy, first earl of Newport (c. 1597–1666)". Oxford Dictionary of National Biography (online ed.). Oxford University Press. doi:10.1093/ref:odnb/2692. (Subscription, Wikipedia Library access or UK public library membership required.)
- Smut, R Malcolm (2004). "Rich, Henry, first earl of Holland (1598-1649)". Oxford Dictionary of National Biography (online ed.). Oxford University Press. doi:10.1093/ref:odnb/23484. (Subscription, Wikipedia Library access or UK public library membership required.)
- Usher, Brett (2004). "Rich, Robert, first earl of Warwick". Oxford Dictionary of National Biography (online ed.). Oxford University Press. doi:10.1093/ref:odnb/61021. (Subscription, Wikipedia Library access or UK public library membership required.)
- Waters, Robert Edmund Chester (1878). Genealogical memoirs of the extinct family of Chester of Chicheley V 1. Robson & Sons.

Military offices
Preceded by The Lord Vere of Tilbury	Master-General of the Ordnance; 1634–1661	Succeeded by Sir William Compton
Peerage of England
New creation	Earl of Newport; 1628–1666	Succeeded by Mountjoy Blount
New creation	Baron Mountjoy; 1627–1666	Succeeded by Mountjoy Blount
Peerage of Ireland
New creation	Baron Mountjoy; 1618–1666	Succeeded by Mountjoy Blount
