= Blount, Cochrane District, Ontario =

Blount
- Dispersed Rural Community
- Location in Ontario
- Coordinates: 49°15′41″N 81°01′27″W
- Country: Canada
- Province: Ontario
- District: Cochrane
- Geographic Township: Blount
- Elevation: 251 m (823 ft)
- Time zone: UTC-5 (Eastern Time Zone)
  - Summer (DST): UTC-4 (Eastern Time Zone)
- Postal Code FSA: P0L
- Area codes: 705, 249

Blount is a railway point and unincorporated place in the eponymous geographic Blount Township, Cochrane District, Ontario, Canada. It is on the Ontario Northland Railway line from Cochrane to Moosonee, between the community of Gardiner to the north and Clute railway station to the south, but is not served by Polar Bear Express passenger trains.
