= Blount Building =

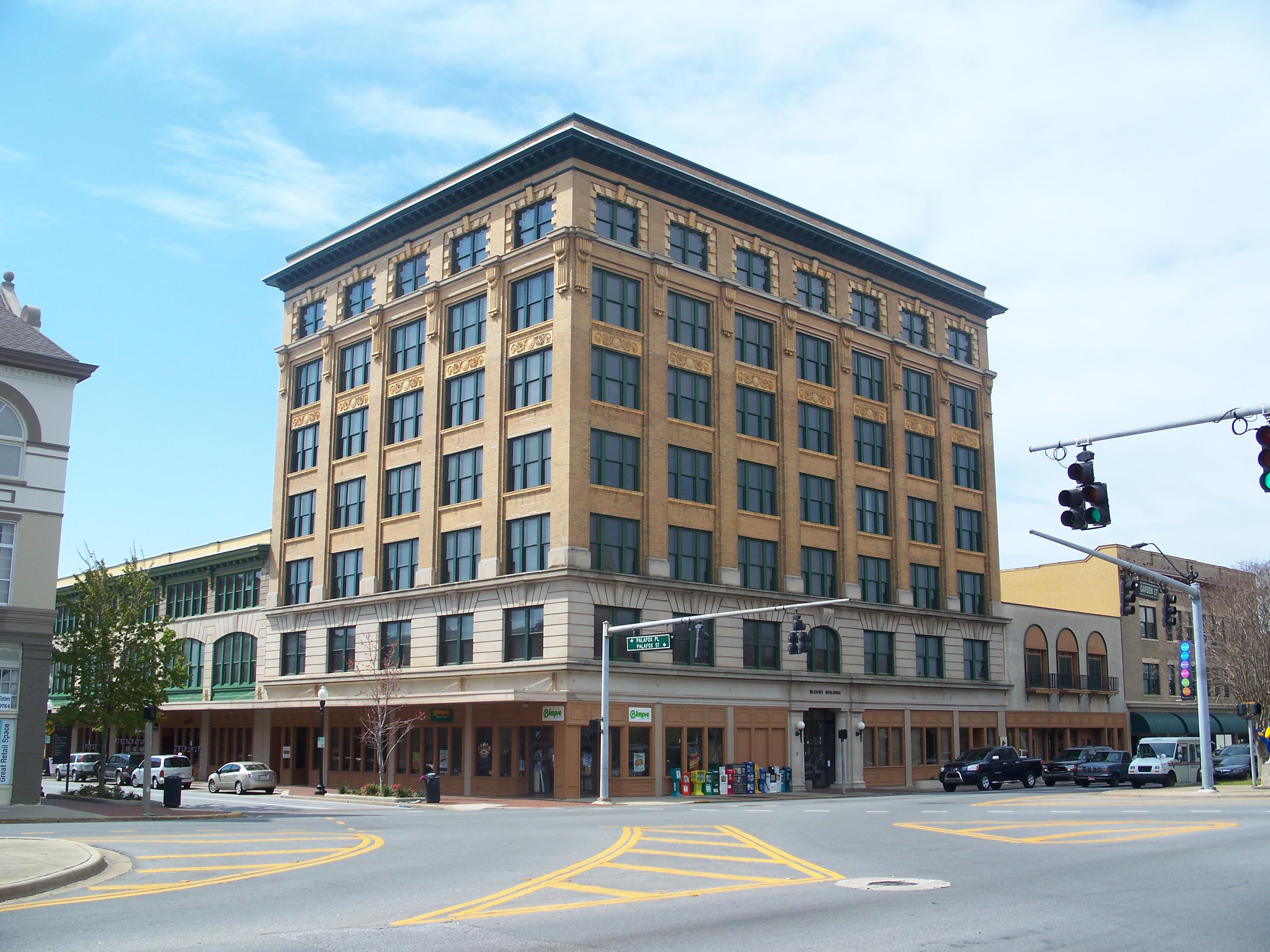
- Blount Building
- Interactive map of the Blount Building area

General information
- Architectural style: Chicago school
- Location: 3 West Garden St., SW corner of Palafox St., Pensacola, Florida, United States
- Coordinates: 30°24′45.5″N 87°12′56.3″W
- Construction started: 1906
- Completed: 1907
- Cost: $200,000
- Client: William Alexander Blount

Technical details
- Structural system: marble, granite, brick, fireproof iron and steelgirders
- Size: 7 stories

Design and construction
- Engineer: Builder: Charles Hill Turner

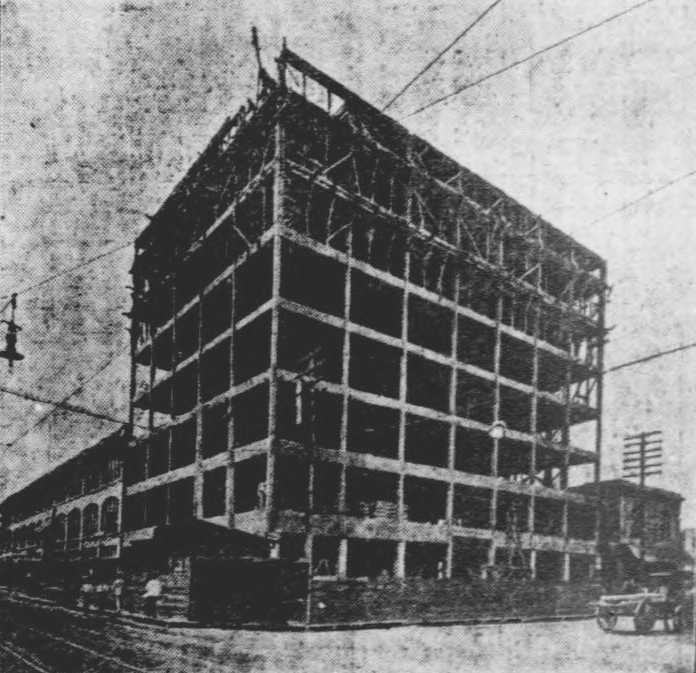
The Blount Building under construction

The Blount Building is an historic seven-story Chicago school style office building located at 3 West Garden St., SW corner of Palafox St., Pensacola, Escambia County, Florida. It was built by Charles Hill Turner in 1906-1907 for local attorney William Alexander Blount on the site of the three-story Blount-Watson Building, which had burned on Halloween night in 1905. The building features so-called Chicago windows and contains in its exterior the three parts of a classical column, with the first and second floors being the base of the column, the third through sixth floors the shaft, and the seventh floor the capital. The first floor exterior has been changed over the years to reflect different retail needs, but the exterior of the upper floors remains intact.

In 1989, the Blount Building was listed in A Guide to Florida's Historic Architecture, published by the University of Florida Press, which described it as a "Fine example of turn-of-the-century commercial architecture in Pensacola.".

In 2015, a group of local investors led by Bobby Switzer purchased the Blount building, the attached Brent building, and the majority of the adjacent buildings. The group of buildings subsequently underwent extensive renovation, adding significantly to the revitalization effort in downtown Pensacola.
