= Charles Blount (soldier) =

English soldier (1568–1600)

Sir Charles Blount (1568–1600) was an English soldier during the Tudor period.

== Life ==
Sir Charles was the son of Sir Michael Blount of Mapledurham House in Oxfordshire and his wife, Mary Moore. Charles and his cousin and namesake Lord Mountjoy (the latter already being Captain of the Town and Isle of Portsmouth) became Freemen of Portsmouth on 26 December 1593.

Lord Mountjoy was a kinsman of Robert Devereux, 2nd Earl of Essex both by blood and by marriage to his sister Penelope. This gained his cousin the Earl's patronage. Charles accompanied the Earl of Essex on a successful expedition to capture Cádiz in June 1596, after which he was knighted, probably one among the large number Essex knighted on board ship before returning to England – so many that the Queen complained, and to Ireland in 1599 (becoming "Coronell Governor" of Cahir Castle in County Tipperary.

He died in 1600 on the trip back to England, and was buried in St Thomas's Church, Portsmouth, now the city's cathedral, where his memorial may still be seen.

== Sources ==
- His memorial
