= Russell Blunt =

American sports coach, athletics administrator (1908–2004)

Biographical details
- Born: April 24, 1908; Andover, Massachusetts, U.S.
- Died: January 7, 2004 (aged 95); Durham, North Carolina, U.S.

Playing career

Football
- c. 1927–1929: Saint Paul (VA)
- 1932: Bluefield State

Basketball
- c. 1927–1930: Saint Paul (VA)
- 1932–1933: Bluefield State

Baseball
- c. 1928–1930: Saint Paul (VA)

Coaching career (HC unless noted)

Football
- c. 1938–1941: Southern (assistant)
- 1942: Florida Normal
- 1944–1945: McKinley HS (LA)
- 1946–1947: St. Augustine's
- 1950–1952: Saint Paul's (VA)
- 1953: North Carolina College (assistant)
- 1954: Florida Normal (assistant)
- 1955–1972: Hillside HS (NC)

Basketball
- 1942–1943: Florida Normal
- 1944–1946: McKinley HS (LA)
- c. 1946–1948: St. Augustine's
- 1954–1955: Florida Normal

Track and field
- 1940: Southern
- 1944–1946: McKinley HS (LA)
- c. 1946–1950: St. Augustine's
- c. 1954: North Carolina College
- 1955–1997: Hillside HS (NC)

Administrative career (AD unless noted)
- 1944–1946: McKinley HS (LA)
- 1946: St. Augustine's
- 1950–1953: Saint Paul's (VA)
- 1955–?: Hillside HS (NC)

Russell Evans Blunt (April 24, 1908 – January 7, 2004) was an American football, basketball, and track and field coach. He served as the head football coach at Florida Normal and Industrial Institute (now known as Florida Memorial University) in Miami Gardens, Florida for one season, in 1942, Saint Augustine's College (now known as Saint Augustine's University) in Raleigh, North Carolina from 1947 to 1948, and Saint Paul's Polytechnic Institute (later known as Saint Paul's College) in Lawrenceville, Virginia from 1950 to 1952. Beginning in 1955, Blunt coached several sports at Durham, North Carolina's Hillside High School.

== Early life, playing career, and education ==
Blunt was born on April 24, 1908, in Andover, Massachusetts. There he attended Andover High School, captaining the football and basketball teams. From 1927 to 1930, Blunt studied at Saint Paul's College—then known as Saint Paul Normal and Industrial School—competing in football basketball, and baseball. He later played football and basketball at Bluefield State Teachers College (now known as Bluefield State University) in Bluefield, West Virginia for a year before settling at Saint Augustine's College (now known as Saint Augustine's University), at which ran competed in track for two years, and earned a bachelor's degree in 1936. Blunt received a Master of Education from Boston University in 1944.

== Coaching career ==
Blunt was an assistant coach at Southern University in Baton Rouge, Louisiana for four years, ultimate serving as line coach for the football team. He was also Southern's head track and field coach for one year. In 1942, Blunt was hired as the head football coach at Florida Normal, succeeding Freeman W. Hinson. He was also the head basketball coach at Florida Normal in 1942–43. Blunt then spent two years coaching football, basketball, and track at Baton Rouge's McKinley High School before returning to Saint Augustine's in 1946 as athletic director and physical education department head. At St. Augustine's, he coached football and basketball for two seasons and track and field for four. In 1950, he went back to Saint Paul's as head coach and athletic director. Blunt left Saint Paul's in 1953 to join the physical education department at North Carolina College—now known as North Carolina Central University—in Durham. There he also assisted Herman Riddick in coaching the football team. The following year, he returned to Florida Normal as physical education instructor and coach. In 1955, Blunt was appointed athletic director and coach at Hillside High School in Durham.

Blunt served as the head football coach at Hillside High School for 18 seasons, compiling a record of 102–70–6 before stepping down from that post in 1973. He won 17 state track titles at Hillside High (ten outdoor and seven indoor), including 118 of 120 dual meets in a 12-year span. In 1993, USA Today reported that the 85-year-old Blunt was the oldest active high school sports coach in the country. He was inducted into the North Carolina Sports Hall of Fame in 1996 for his track contributions. In 1997, Hillsdale won the indoor state track championship, making Blunt the oldest coach in the United States to win a state title. He retired after the 1997 season, and died on January 7, 2004, in Durham.

== Head coaching record ==
=== College football ===
| Year | Team | Overall | Conference | Standing | Bowl/playoffs |
|---|---|---|---|---|---|
St. Augustine's Falcons (Colored Intercollegiate Athletic Association) (1946)
| 1946 | St. Augustine's | 3–1 | 1–0 | NA | |
| 1947 | St. Augustine's | 3–4–1 | 0–2–1 | NA | |
| St. Augustine's: | | 6–5–1 | 1–2–1 | | |
Saint Paul's Tigers (Colored/Central Intercollegiate Athletic Association) (1950–1952)
| 1950 | Saint Paul's | 0–7 | 0–7 | 16th | |
| 1951 | Saint Paul's | 0–8 | 0–7 | 16th | |
| 1952 | Saint Paul's | 0–8 | 0–6 | 15th | |
| Saint Paul's: | | 0–23 | 0–20 | | |
| Total: | | | | | |
