= Richard Blount (died 1564) =

Richard Blount (died 1564) was a sixteenth-century Oxfordshire gentleman, MP and Lieutenant of the Tower of London.

== Life ==
He was the son of Richard Blount (d. 1508) and his wife Elizabeth, the daughter of William de la Ford of Iver, Buckinghamshire. His father purchased Mapledurham in 1489 and acquired Iver through his marriage. The family were a cadet branch of the Mountjoy family. He was a member of the household of Henry VIII and Edward VI and was knighted in 1550/1. He became keeper of Dedisham manor and Slinfold, Sussex and consequently elected to Parliament for Steyning in 1553. Having laid low during the reign of Mary I, he returned to public life in the reign of her successor. He was chosen to represent Oxfordshire in the Parliament of 1563 and was appointed lieutenant of the Tower by Elizabeth I.

== Family ==
He had married Elizabeth, daughter of Sir Richard Lyster of Southampton by 1529.

- Michael (c.1530–1610)
- Richard Blount (d. 1628) who was MP for Lymington in 1593
- Elizabeth, 1535-1597, married Nicholas St John of Lydiard Tregoze, Wiltshire, 1526-1589
