= Peter Blount =

American sprinter and bobsledder (born 1962 or 1963)

Personal information
- Nickname(s): Coach B., Peter B, Daddy Blount.
- Nationality: American
- Born: 1962 or 1963 (age 62–63) Melbourne, Florida
- Height: 6 ft 2 in (1.88 m)
- Weight: 210 lb (95 kg)

Sport
- Country: United States
- Sport: Track and field, Bobsled
- Now coaching: Elite athletes (Professional trainer @ Gameday Speed)
- Updated on 1 June 2013

Peter Blount (born 1962 or 1963) is a former member of the World Cup Bobsled Team and former member of the US National Track and Field Team and coached the USA Youth National Track and Field Team. He was named to the Florida Track and Field Hall of Fame and the Florida Athletic Coaches Association (FACA) Hall of Fame in January 2013. He holds the distinction of competing on United States National Teams in both Summer (Track and Field) and Winter (Bobsled) sports.

He has one of the highest elite athlete testing scores in history. He recorded an 806 on a six-item Elite Athlete Performance Test (30 M. dash, 60 M. dash, 100 M. dash, 16 lb. weight toss, five consecutive hops, and vertical jump) given by the United States Bobsled and Skeleton Federation. To put that into perspective, consider that Willie Gault, a world-class sprinter and a wide receiver for the Los Angeles Raiders, scored 802 points, Herschel Walker and Edwin Moses, an Olympic gold medalist in the 400-meter hurdles, tied with 761 points. He has degrees in education and business.

He was a sprinter at the University of Florida from 1983-1985. He competed as a Professional Athlete with the Florida Clippers and NIKE from 1989-1994 .

As of 2013, he is a professional trainer and businessman (Founder of Muscles of Faith, Inc.). In addition to coaching the USA Youth National Track and Field Team, he has also coached Satellite High School, Florida, to three consecutive State Championships and one runner-up, and in just one year and nine months coached Dr. Phillips High School in Orlando to a runner-up finish in 2010 (both they and Miami Columbus finished with 103 points), as well as three additional top 5 State finishes in Cross Country and Track and Field. He was named the Coach of the Year in 2009 by the National Federation of State High School Association (NFHS). He also has personally trained many high school and college All-Americans, Jamaica National Team members (Duane Evans and Shernette Hyatt) as well as professional athletes including NFL All-Pro Brandon Meriweather among others.
