= Thomas Blunt (optician) =

English instrument maker (died 1823)

Thomas Blunt (died 1823) was an English instrument maker, of scientific, optical and mathematical instruments.

Blunt was apprenticed in 1760 to Edward Nairne (1726–1806), whose partner he later became. The two ran a business together from 1774 to 1793. According to Thomas Blunt's January 1760 apprenticeship contract, his father, William, was a shoemaker in Barnes, Surrey. Thomas's birth date has yet to be discovered. His burial record stated that he was 83 years old when he died on 16 March 1823, giving a birth year of 1739 or 1740. An obituary gave his age as 84. Yet, those dates would mean that Thomas was 20–21 years old when he began his apprenticeship, which is rather late in life. A more common age would be 15 or so, suggesting a birth date of around 1744-1745.

Two of Blunt's sons, Edward and William, became members of the Spectacle Makers’ Guild as consequences of their father's membership. According to their admission papers, Thomas Blunt became a Guild Member in 1769.

The next identified record of Blunt's life is the 20 December 1773 marriage contract between Thomas and the father of Mary Moys Fly, John Moys Fly. Mary was then 19 years old, and, as a minor, required her parents’ permission to marry. The contract states that Thomas Blunt was a resident of Tooting, Surrey. He may have operated a business in that town during the seven years between the end of his apprenticeship and the beginning of his partnership with Nairne.

Thomas and Mary married on 6 January 1774 at Tooting Parish Church. Edward Nairne signed the parish record as a witness.

According to Gerard l’E. Turner, Edward Nairne and Thomas Blunt formed their famous partnership in 1774. Nairne was already established at 20 Cornhill, across the road from the Royal Exchange, and the partners continued business at that location.

Thomas and Mary's son, Charles Fly Blunt, was born on 28 April 1775. There do not appear to have been any other surviving children. Mary died between 1775 and 1788, when Thomas Blunt “widower”, married Margaret Fenn. Since a major task of a wife in those days was to tend the children, Thomas’ remarriage in 1788 suggests that Mary died only a short time before then.

Thomas and Margaret had 7 children: Thomas (born 28 July 1789), Elizabeth (born 28 February 1791), Henry (baptised 28 April 1793), Martha (baptised 15 June 1794), Edward (born 11 January 1798), William (born 25 December 1799) and Ann (born 24 January 1802). All except Henry were mentioned in Thomas’ will, and there are no further records of the boy, suggesting that the son died young. Thomas Jr. and Edward trained with their father, and both were involved in family partnerships. William appears to have trained with his father to some extent (he became a member of the Spectacle Makers’ Guild), but followed an academic and clerical path to become a well-regarded teacher at Merchant Taylors’ School.

Thomas Blunt served as Master of the Spectacle Makers’ Guild in 1792 and 1815.

Blunt's prestige in the optical community, evident by his elevation to Master in 1792, may have prompted him to split with Nairne and form his own company. The partnership was dissolved on 24 July 1793. Blunt opened a shop two doors down from Nairne, at 22 Cornhill. It is not known how the relationship fared between the two former partners, who remained neighbours until Nairne retired in 1801.

By 1794, Thomas had acquired the honour of “Mathematical Instrument Maker to His Majesty”.
