= Blunt (snowboard magazine) =

American snowboard magazine

Blunt Snowboard Magazine was an American snowboard magazine published in the 1990s. The magazine was established in 1993 and the founder was Ken Block. DC Shoes were the initial publishers of Blunt, which mainly featured advertisements for new, small and independent companies. The magazine also featured regular submissions by skateboarder Ed Templeton and photos by Rob "Whitey" McConnaughy. The magazine was eventually sold to Big Brother Magazine and in 1997 on to Larry Flynt Publications. Blunt ceased publication in 1998.
