= John James Blunt =

- Church: Church of England
- Installed: 1839
- Term ended: 1855
- Other posts: Rector of Great Oakley, Hulsean Lecturer
- Previous post: Curate in Shropshire

Personal details
- Born: 1794 Newcastle-under-Lyme, Staffordshire, England
- Died: June 18, 1855 (aged 60–61)
- Education: St John's College, Cambridge

John James Blunt (1794 – 18 June 1855) was an English Anglican priest. His writings included studies of the early Church.

== Life ==
Blunt was born at Newcastle-under-Lyme in Staffordshire. He was educated at St John's College, Cambridge, where he took his degree as fifteenth wrangler in 1816 and obtained a fellowship. He was appointed a Worts travelling bachelor 1818, and spent some time in Italy and Sicily, afterwards publishing an account of his journey. He proceeded to his MA in 1819, BD 1826, and was Hulsean Lecturer in 1831-1832 while holding a curacy in Shropshire.

In 1834, he became rector of Great Oakley in Essex, and in 1839 was appointed Lady Margaret's Professor of Divinity at Cambridge. In 1854 he declined the see of Salisbury.

In his chief book, Undesigned Coincidences in the Writings both of the Old and New Testaments (1833; fuller edition, 1847), he coined the term undesigned coincidences. Some of his writings, among them the History of the Christian Church during the First Three Centuries and the lectures On the Right Use of the Early Fathers, were published posthumously.

A short memoir of him appeared in 1856 from the hand of William Selwyn, his successor in the divinity professorship.

== Works ==
- The Veracity of the Gospels & Acts of the Apostles, Argued from the Undesigned Coincidences to Be Found in Them, When Compared (1828)
- The Veracity of the Five Books of Moses, Argued from the Undesigned Coincidences to be Found in Them, when Compared in Their Several Parts (1830)
- Undesigned Coincidences in the Writings both of the Old and New Testaments (1833; fuller edition, 1847)
- History of the Christian Church during the First Three Centuries (1861)
- On the Right Use of the Early Fathers (1869)
