= Ted Blunt =

American politician (1943–2024)

President of the Wilmington City Council
- In office January 8, 2001 – 2009

Member of the Wilmington City Council
- In office 1985–2000

Personal details
- Born: Theodore Blunt; March 22, 1943 Philadelphia, Pennsylvania, U.S.
- Died: January 11, 2024 (aged 80)
- Party: Democratic
- Spouse: Alice Latrelle Jackson
- Children: 3, including Lisa Blunt Rochester
- Education: Winston-Salem State University (BS); Rutgers University (MSW)
- Occupation: Politician, educator, athlete

Theodore Blunt (March 22, 1943 – January 11, 2024) was an American politician, educator, and athlete. Blunt's political career in the state of Delaware included serving 16 years as a Wilmington District Councilman and 8 years as city council president. He was the father of U.S. Senator Lisa Blunt Rochester.

== Early life and education ==
Theodore Blunt was born and raised in Philadelphia, Pennsylvania. He was one of four children born to Helen and John Blunt. Ted Blunt and his family were no strangers to hardships and difficult times. Growing up in the James Weldon Johnson Housing Projects in North Philadelphia, the family developed their shared belief in hard work, persistence and a strong family bond.

Blunt graduated from Simon Gratz High School in Philadelphia and Winston-Salem Teachers College (now Winston-Salem State University WSSU) with a Bachelor of Science degree in elementary education. Three years later, Blunt graduated from Rutgers University with a Master of Social Work.

== Career ==
=== Sports ===
Blunt's athletic achievements in high school included making All Public Teams in both basketball and soccer as well as being the Markward Club's Public League's Most Valuable Player in Basketball his senior year.

At WSSU, his athletic accomplishments as a basketball player included:

- 1961 to 1965 All C.I.A.A. Conference and Tournament teams
- 1963 C.I.A.A. Tournament Most Valuable Player Award
- 1963 and 1964 Georgia Invitational All Tournament teams
- 1963 and 1964 Georgia Invitational Most Valuable Player awards
- 1964 and 1965 All N.A.I.A. teams
- 1964 selected to participate on the N.A.I.A. Olympic Trials Basketball Team

Notably, along with teammate Earl "the Pearl" Monroe, Blunt's basketball career was led by his mentor and coach, Clarence "Big House" Gaines.

In 2012, Blunt was honored as the Inaugural Inductee into the Delaware Blue/Gold Basketball Hall of Fame.

=== Early career ===
His professional career started in Philadelphia as a Juvenile Gang Worker and immediately after graduate school he worked as a group therapist at Temple University. In 1969, Blunt and his family moved to Wilmington, Delaware, where he served as a director for Peoples Settlement Association. His desire to improve the lives of young people was further realized in the field of education, where he served as a central office administrator for 36 years of credited service in three different school districts (Wilmington, New Castle County and the Red Clay Consolidated School Districts).

=== Politics ===
In 1985 Blunt was elected to the Wilmington City Council; he served on the Finance, Expenditure Review, Bond and the Audit Committees. He also served on the Cablevision Commission, the Board of Pensions and Retirement, the Home Ownership Corporation, and the Port Authority. In 2000 Blunt was elected President of the Wilmington City Council and Chairman of the Wilmington Cable Commission. Under Blunt's leadership funding was made available for student scholarships citywide, operating hours for five community centers were extended and Wilmington's elementary schools received funds to address the needs of at-risk students.

In 2008, Blunt announced that he would seek the office of lieutenant governor. He would later suspend his campaign citing the following: The need to unify the Party; the lack of campaign finance reform and the high cost of running campaigns; and most importantly the desire to spend more time with family.

== Personal life ==
Over the years, Blunt supported WSSU with his time and also contributions. Consistent with his focus on education and giving back, in 2010, Blunt fully repaid his alma mater for his four-year scholarship. He presented WSSU a lump-sum check in the amount of $6,400. His daughter, Lisa Blunt Rochester, was elected to the United States House of Representatives in 2016.She would later be elected to the United States Senate in November 2024, ten months after her father’s death, becoming the first woman to represent Delaware in the chamber.

In 2011, celebrating 50 years of marriage, Blunt and wife, Alice LaTrelle (Jackson), renewed their wedding vows in the presence of their children and grandchildren.

Blunt died on January 11, 2024, at the age of 80.
