= James A. Blount =

American lawyer and politician

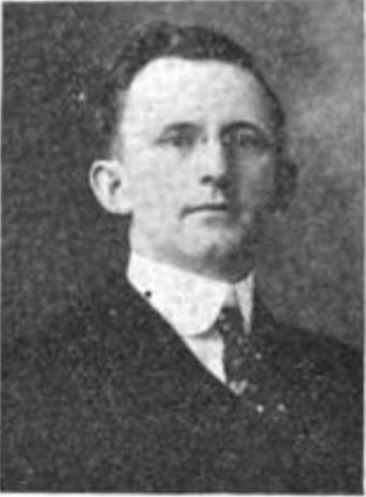
- c. 1917

Member of the Mississippi Senate from the 27th district 28th (1916-1917)
- In office January 1944 – January 1948
- In office January 1916 – 1917

Member of the Mississippi House of Representatives from the Tallahatchie County district
- In office January 1948 – January 1952

Personal details
- Born: December 29, 1884 Charleston, Mississippi, U.S.
- Died: October 6, 1974 (aged 89) Charleston, Mississippi, U.S.
- Party: Democrat

James Andrew Blount (December 29, 1884 – October 6, 1974) was an American lawyer and Democratic politician. He was a member of the Mississippi Senate from 1916 to 1917 and from 1944 to 1948. He also was a member of the Mississippi House of Representatives from 1948 to 1952.

== Biography ==
James Andrew Blount was born on December 29, 1884, in Williamsburg, Mississippi. He was the son of Thomas C. Blount. He graduated from Millsaps College in 1908 with PhD and B. S. degrees. From 1909 to 1910, he took a post-graduate course at the University of Mississippi.

He was the Superintendent of Schools in Charleston, Mississippi, for 3 years in the late 1900s (decade). He then went back to college to study law. He received a L. L. B. from Millsaps College in 1913.

== Political career ==
In November 1915, he was elected to represent Mississippi's 28th district in the Mississippi Senate as a Democrat for the 1916–1920 term. He served the term until 1917, when he went to fight in World War I. In the war, he was promoted to captain (he later retired from the U. S. Army as a colonel). After the war, he was the Tallahatchie County prosecuting Attorney from 1928 to 1940. He then represented Mississippi's 27th district in the Mississippi Senate from 1944 to 1948. He represented Tallahatchie County in the Mississippi House of Representatives from 1948 to 1952.

== Personal life ==
Blount was married to Ethel Harvey; they had no children. Blount died on October 6, 1974, in the Tallahatchie County Hospital in Charleston, Mississippi.
