= DC Shoes =

American skate/action sports brand

DC Shoes, Inc.
- Type: Subsidiary
- Founded: June 1994; 32 years ago
- Founder: Ken Block, Damon Way, Clayton Blehm
- Headquarters: Huntington Beach, California, United States
- Key people: Ken Block, Damon Way, Danny Way, Clayton Blehm, Colin McKay, Rob Dyrdek
- Products: Footwear, apparel, snowboards
- Parent: Authentic Brands Group
- Website: www.dcshoes.com

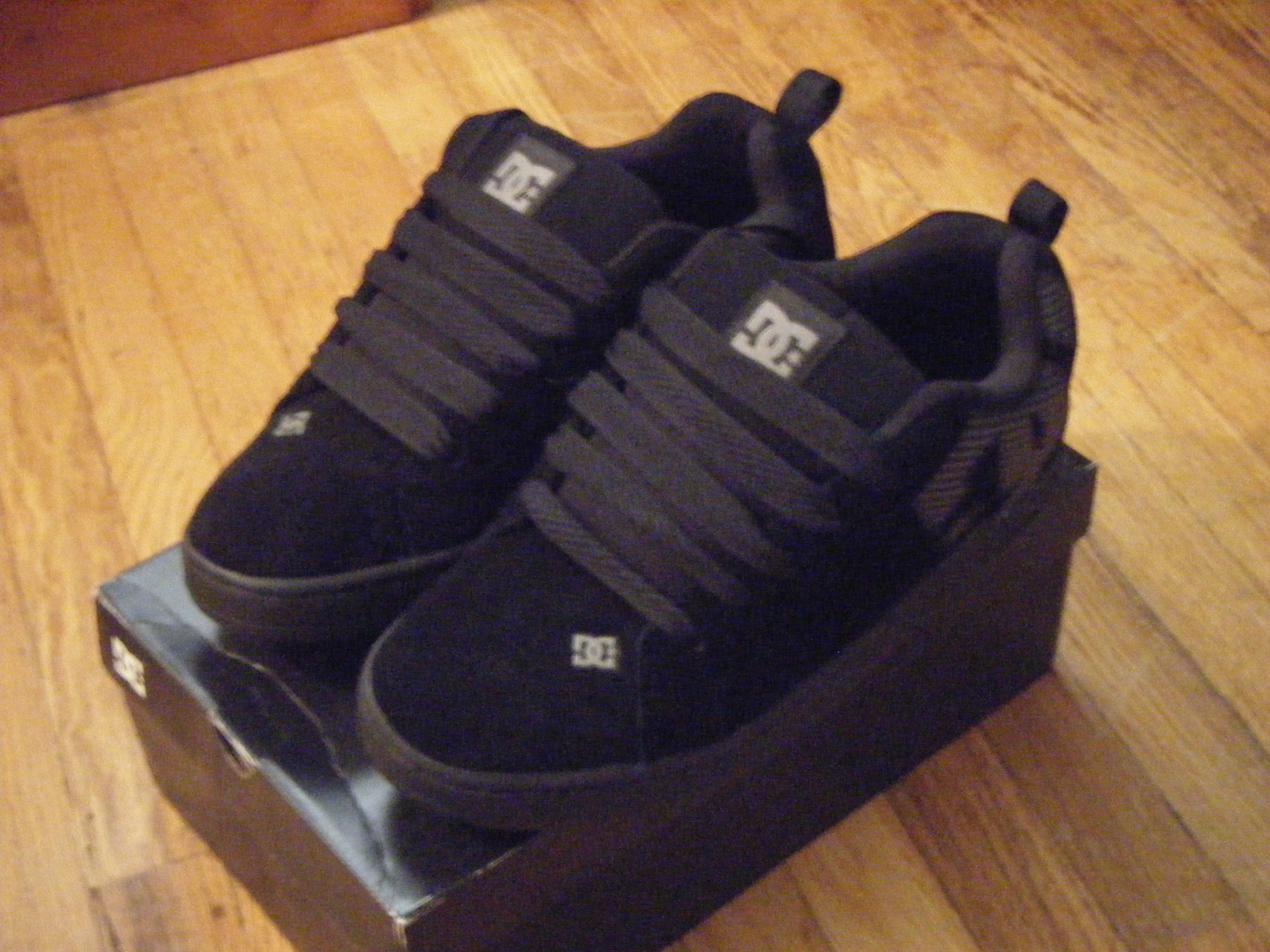
A pair of DC Shoes

DC Shoes, Inc. is an American brand that specializes in footwear for action sports such as skateboarding and snowboarding. The company also sells apparel, bags, accessories, hats, t-shirts, and posters.

== History ==
DC was founded in June 1994 by Damon Way, Ken Block and Clayton Blehm. It was originally based in Carlsbad, California, but is now based in Huntington Beach, California. DC originally stood for "Droors Clothing," but since the sale of Droors Clothing in 2004, DC no longer has ties to Droors and is simply DC Shoes, Inc.

On March 8, 2004, DC Shoes was acquired by Quiksilver in an $87 million transaction. In 2010, DC Shoes moved from Vista, California, to Quiksilver's headquarters in Huntington Beach. A video entitled Skateboarding Is Forever was released online in 2010 and featured skateboarders Marquise Henry, Matt Miller, Wes Kremer, Evan Smith, and Greg Myers. Apart from Myers and Henry, all of the skateboarders from the video remained sponsored by the company in 2013, and have since attained professional status.

In 2011, the brand underwent a rejuvenation process that included the design of a new flag logo. As part of this process, new skateboard team announcements were progressively made and a series of advertisements, under the direction of new team member Steve Berra, were released online. The other new team announcements were Mikey Taylor, Mike Mo Capaldi, Nyjah Huston, Chris Cole, and Davis Torgerson. Felipe Gustavo was introduced at a later stage.

A progression of the brand relaunch was the "Rediscovery" campaign that commenced in December 2011, following the addition of Capaldi and Huston to the skateboard team.

Co-founder Block died in a snowmobile crash in January 2023.

On February 2, 2025, Liberated Brands, owner of DC Shoes retail stores, filed for Chapter 11 bankruptcy protection, listing assets and liabilities between $100 million and $500 million. The company announced the closure of all remaining DC Shoes stores, with liquidation sales beginning a week before the bankruptcy.

== See also ==
- Plan B Skateboards
- Extreme Sports
