= Henry Blount, 4th Earl of Newport =

English peer

Henry Blount, 4th Earl of Newport (died 25 September 1679) was an English peer and member of the House of Lords.

He inherited the titles of 4th Earl of Newport and 4th Baron Mountjoy on the death of his brother Thomas Blount, 3rd Earl of Newport. He married Susannah Briscoe, daughter of John Briscoe of Grafton, Kent. He and his two elder brothers were "all idiots", and some confusion exists as to their names and dates of death. Parish registers indicate that Henry was buried at Great Harrowden (home of his brother-in-law, Nicholas Knollys) in September 1679. Upon his death, all of his titles became extinct.

Peerage of England
Preceded by Thomas Blount	Earl of Newport; 1675 – 1679	Extinct
