= Earl of Newport =

Coat of arms of Blunt family as Earls of Newport

Earl of Newport, in the Isle of Wight, was a title in the Peerage of England. It was created in 1628 for Mountjoy Blount, 1st Baron Mountjoy, an illegitimate son of Charles Blount, 1st Earl of Devonshire. He had already been created Baron Mountjoy, of Mountjoy Fort in the County of Tyrone, in the Peerage of Ireland in 1618, and Baron Mountjoy, of Thurveston in the County of Derby, in the Peerage of England in 1627. The latter title was originally created with precedence ahead of those barons created between 20 May and 5 June 1627. This precedence was later revoked by the House of Lords. The first Earl's three surviving sons were "all idiots", and some confusion exists as to their names and dates of death. Parish registers indicate that the second Earl, named either George or Mountjoy, died at Newport House in London, and was buried at St Martin-in-the-Fields in March 1675; his brother Thomas, the third Earl, was buried at Weyhill in May 1675; and their youngest brother Henry was buried at Great Harrowden (home of his brother-in-law, Nicholas Knollys) in September 1679. Upon his death, all of his father's titles became extinct.

== Earls of Newport (1628–1679) ==
- Mountjoy Blount, 1st Earl of Newport (1597–1666)
- Mountjoy (George) Blount, 2nd Earl of Newport (died 1675)
- Thomas Blount, 3rd Earl of Newport (died 1675)
- Henry Blount, 4th Earl of Newport (died 1679)

== Coat of arms ==
Coat of arms of Earl of Newport
Coronet A coronet of an Earl Crest Out of a ducal coronet or, a crescent gold. Escutcheon Barry nebuly of six or and sable within a bordure conpony argent and gules. Supporters Two knights in complete armor proper collared, belted, and pommels and hilts of swords or.
