= John Henry Blunt =

English Anglican cleric and historian (1823–1884)

John Henry Blunt (25 August 1823 in Chelsea – 11 April 1884 in London) was an English divine.

== Life ==
Before attending University College, Durham in 1850, he spent several years working as a manufacturing chemist. He was ordained in 1852, earned his M.A. in 1855, and published a work titled The Atonement that same year. He subsequently held several church positions, including the vicarage of Kennington near Oxford in 1868, which he left in 1873 to take the crown living of Beverston in Gloucestershire. In June 1882, Durham awarded him a Doctor of Divinity degree. He died suddenly in London on 11 April 1884 (Good Friday) and was buried in Battersea Cemetery.

== Works ==
He became a voluminous writer in the fields of theology and ecclesiastical history, and had published among other works an annotated edition of the Prayer Book (1867), a History of the English Reformation (1868), a Book of Church Law (1872), A Key to the Knowledge and Use of the Holy Bible (1873), as well as a Dictionary of Doctrinal and Historical Theology (1870). The continuation of these labors was seen in a Dictionary of Sects and Heresies (1874), an Annotated Bible (3 vols., 1878–1879), and a Cyclopaedia of Religion (1884).

- Dictionary of Sects, Heresies, Ecclesiastical Parties, and Schools of Religious Thought. Rivingtons, 1903.
