= History of parliamentary constituencies and boundaries in Cambridgeshire =

The ceremonial county of Cambridgeshire, which includes the unitary authority of Peterborough, has returned 8 MPs to the UK Parliament since 2024.

The modern county incorporates the historic counties of Cambridgeshire and Huntingdonshire and part of Northamptonshire. Under the Local Government Act 1888, which created county councils, the Isle of Ely and the Soke of Peterborough were created as separate administrative counties, hived off from Cambridgeshire and Northamptonshire respectively. In 1965 the administrative counties of Cambridgeshire and the Isle of Ely, and Huntingdonshire and the Soke of Peterborough, were combined to form Cambridgeshire and Isle of Ely, and Huntingdon and Peterborough respectively. Subsequently, as a result of the local government reorganisation introduced by the Local Government Act 1972, which came into effect on 1 April 1974, these two counties were amalgamated.

== Number of seats ==
The table below shows the number of MPs representing Cambridgeshire (including Isle of Ely, Huntingdonshire and, from 1974, Peterborough) at each major redistribution of seats affecting the county.

| Year | County seats^{1} | Borough seats^{1} | Total |
|---|---|---|---|
| Prior to 1832 | 4 | 4 | 8 |
| 1832–1868 | 5 | 4 | 9 |
| 1868–1885 | 5 | 3 | 8 |
| 1885–1918 | 5 | 1 | 6 |
| 1918–1974 | 3 | 1 | 4 |
| 1974–1983 | 3 | 2 | 5 |
| 1983–1997 | 4 | 2 | 6 |
| 1997–2024 | 5 | 2 | 7 |
| 2024–present | 7 | 1 | 8 |

^{1}Prior to 1950, seats were classified as County Divisions or Parliamentary Boroughs. Since 1950, they have been classified as County or Borough Constituencies.

== Timeline ==
County seat Borough seat

| Constituency | Prior to 1832 | 1832–1868 | 1868–1885 | 1885–1918 | 1918–1974 | 1974–1983 | 1983–1997 | 1997–2024 | 2024–present |
|---|---|---|---|---|---|---|---|---|---|
| Peterborough | Included with Northamptonshire prior to 1974 | | | | | 1974–2024 | | | 2024–present |
| North West Cambridgeshire | | | | | | | | 1997–present | |
| Huntingdonshire | 1290–1885 (2 MPs) | | | | 1918–1983 | | | | |
| Huntingdon | 1295–1868 (2 MPs) | | 1868–1885 | 1885–1918 | | | 1983–present | | |
| Ramsey | | | | 1885–1918 | | | | | |
| St Neots and Mid Cambridgeshire | | | | | | | | | 2024–present |
| Cambridgeshire | 1290–1832 (2 MPs) | 1832–1885 (3 MPs) | | | 1918–1983 | | | | |
| Wisbech | | | | 1885–1918 | | | | | |
| Isle of Ely | | | | | 1918–1983 | | | | |
| North East Cambridgeshire | | | | | | | 1983–present | | |
| Newmarket | | | | 1885–1918 | | | | | |
| South East Cambridgeshire | | | | | | | 1983–2024 | | |
| Ely and East Cambridgeshire | | | | | | | | | 2024–present |
| Cambridge | 1295–1885 (2 MPs) | | | 1885–present | | | | | |
| Chesterton | | | | 1885–1918 | | | | | |
| South West Cambridgeshire | | | | | | | 1983–1997 | | |
| South Cambridgeshire | | | | | | | | 1997–present | |

Additionally, Cambridge University returned two Members of Parliament from 1603 to 1950. However it was not a geographic area and instead represented the graduates of the university.

== Boundary reviews ==
| Prior to 1885 | Since 1290, the counties of Cambridgeshire and Huntingdonshire, along with all other English Counties regardless of size or population, had elected two MPs (knights of the shire) to the House of Commons. The parliamentary boroughs of Cambridge and Huntingdon had been represented since 1295, each also returning two MPs (burgesses). The only change resulting from the Reform Act 1832, which radically changed the representation of the House of Commons, was to increase the representation of Cambridgeshire to 3 MPs. Under the Representation of the People Act 1867, the representation of the Borough of Huntingdon was reduced to one MP. | | |
| 1885 | Under the Redistribution of Seats Act 1885, the representation of the Borough of Cambridge was reduced to one MP and Cambridgeshire was divided into three single-member constituencies, namely the Northern or Wisbech Division, the Eastern or Newmarket Division and the Western or Chesterton Division. The Borough of Huntingdon was abolished and Huntingdonshire was divided into two single-member constituencies, namely the Northern or Ramsey Division and the Southern or Huntingdon Division. | Huntingdonshire 1885–1918 | Cambridgeshire 1885–1918 |
| 1918 | Under the Local Government Act 1888, which created county councils, the Isle of Ely was created as a separate administrative county, hived off from Cambridgeshire. These changes were not reflected in the parliamentary constituencies until they were next redistributed by the Representation of the People Act 1918. The Wisbech Division was replaced by the parliamentary county of Isle of Ely, and included the city of Ely, which had been in the Newmarket Division, and a small area in the north of the Chesterton Division. Areas of the expanded Municipal Borough of Cambridge which had been in the Chesterton Division were now included in the parliamentary borough, with the remainder of Newmarket and Chesterton being combined to form the re-established parliamentary county of Cambridgeshire. The Ramsey and Huntingdon Divisions were also combined to form the re-established Parliamentary County of Huntingdonshire. These constituencies remained more-or-less unchanged until 1974. | | Cambridgeshire, Isle of Ely and Huntingdonshire 1918–1974 |
| 1974 | In 1965 the administrative counties of Cambridgeshire and the Isle of Ely, and Huntingdonshire and the Soke of Peterborough, were combined to form Cambridgeshire and Isle of Ely and Huntingdon and Peterborough respectively. Following the Second Periodic Review of Westminster Constituencies, which came into effect for the February 1974 general election, Peterborough was redesignated as a borough constituency, composed of the local authorities which had comprised the Soke, together with the small Rural District of Thorney, which was transferred from the county/constituency of Isle of Ely. The only other change affected Huntingdonshire, gaining the village of Eaton Socon, which had been in the county of Bedfordshire/constituency of Mid Bedfordshire, and had been absorbed into the Urban District of St Neots.* | | Cambridgeshire and Isle of Ely, and Huntingdon and Peterborough 1974–1983 |
| 1983 | The Third Review reflected the 1974 local government reorganisation arising from the Local Government Act 1972 which saw a further rationalisation, resulting in the two recently created administrative counties being combined to form the non-metropolitan county of Cambridgeshire. The review resulted in the first major redistribution of seats since 1918, with the abolition of the three county constituencies of Huntingdonshire, Isle of Ely and Cambridgeshire, and the creation of four new constituencies: Huntingdon comprised the majority of the former constituency of Huntingdonshire, including Huntingdon, Godmanchester, Ramsey and St Ives. Areas to the west of Peterborough, including Barnack and Werrington, were transferred from the borough constituency of Peterborough, whilst areas to the south of the River Nene, including Fletton and the Ortons, which were now part of the expanded City of Peterborough, were included in Peterborough.; North East Cambridgeshire was formed from the Isle of Ely, with the exception of the city of Ely itself. It also included Thorney and Eye, transferred back from Peterborough.; South East Cambridgeshire included eastern areas, comprising the majority of the former constituency of Cambridgeshire, as well as the city of Ely.; South West Cambridgeshire was made up from parts of three existing constituencies: southern parts of Huntingdonshire, including St Neots; western parts of Cambridgeshire; and the City of Cambridge wards of Trumpington and Queen Edith's, transferred from Cambridge. | | Cambridgeshire 1983–1997 |
| 1997 | The Fourth Review saw another increase in the number of constituencies, with the creation of the constituency of North West Cambridgeshire. This was formed from northern parts of Huntingdon, including Ramsey, and parts of Peterborough, comprising areas to the south of the River Nene (wards of Fletton, Orton Langueville, Orton Waterville and Stanground). Werrington ward was transferred from Huntingdon to Peterborough. To compensate for the loss of northern areas, Huntingdon gained southern parts of the former county, including St Neots, from South West Cambridgeshire, which was consequently renamed South Cambridgeshire. Other changes included the transfer of north-western areas from South East Cambridgeshire to South Cambridgeshire and a small area from North East Cambridgeshire to South East Cambridgeshire. | | Cambridgeshire 1997–2010 |
| 2010 | The 2007 report of the Boundary Commission for England retained the same seven constituencies that had existed since the 1997 election, with minor boundary changes to align with current local government wards and to better equalise the electorates. These changes, which were implemented at the 2010 general election, included the transfer back of Thorney and Eye from North East Cambridgeshire to Peterborough, the return of the Cambridge ward of Trumpington from South Cambridgeshire to the Cambridge constituency, and small transfers of rural wards from North West Cambridgeshire to Huntingdon, and from South East Cambridgeshire to South Cambridgeshire. | | Cambridgeshire 2010–2024 |
| 2024 | For the 2023 Periodic Review of Westminster constituencies, which redrew the constituency map ahead of the 2024 United Kingdom general election, the Boundary Commission for England retained Cambridgeshire as a sub-region of the East of England region, increasing the number of seats from seven to eight with the creation of St Neots and Mid Cambridgeshire. The town of St Neots was transferred from Huntingdon and the Mid Cambridgeshire areas, including the new towns of Cambourne and Northstowe, from South Cambridgeshire and South East Cambridgeshire. Other changes included: Cherry Hinton transferred from Cambridge to South Cambridgeshire; The villages of Sawtrey, Somersham and Warboys and surrounding rural areas added to Huntingdon from North West Cambridgeshire; The villages and Fulbourn and Linton moving from South East Cambridgeshire to South Cambridgeshire, with Cottenham going in the opposite direction; Littleport transferred from North East Cambridgeshire to South Cambridgeshire.; As a result of the last two changes, South East Cambridgeshire renamed Ely and East Cambridgeshire.; Peterborough re-designated as a county constituency. | | Cambridgeshire 2024-present |

== See also ==
- List of parliamentary constituencies in Cambridgeshire
