= List of electoral wards in Cambridgeshire =

This is a list of electoral divisions and wards in the ceremonial county of Cambridgeshire in the East of England. All changes since the re-organisation of local government following the passing of the Local Government Act 1972 are shown. The number of councillors elected for each electoral division or ward is shown in brackets.

== County council ==
=== Cambridgeshire ===
Electoral Divisions from 1 April 1974 (first election 12 April 1973) to 2 May 1985:

1. Abbey (1)
2. Arbury (1)
3. Barnack (1)
4. Castle (1)
5. Chatteris (1)
6. Cherry Hinton No. 1 (1)
7. Cherry Hinton No. 2 (1)
8. Chesterton No. 1 (1)
9. Chesterton No. 2 (1)
10. Chesterton No. 3 (1)
11. Chesterton No. 4 (1)
12. Chesterton No. 5 (1)
13. Chesterton No. 6 (1)
14. Chesterton No. 7 (1)
15. Coleridge (1)
16. East Chesterton (1)
17. Ely (1)
18. Ely Rural No. 1 (1)
19. Ely Rural No. 2 (1)
20. Huntingdon & Godmanchester No. 1 (1)
21. Huntingdon & Godmanchester No. 2 (1)
22. Huntingdon Rural No. 1 (1)
23. Huntingdon Rural No. 2 (1)
24. March No. 1 (1)
25. March No. 2 (1)
26. Market (1)
27. Newmarket Rural No. 1 (1)
28. Newmarket Rural No. 2 (1)
29. Newmarket Rural No. 3 (1)
30. Newnham No. 1 (1)
31. Newnham No. 2 (1)
32. Norman Cross (1)
33. North Witchford (1)
34. Old Fletton No. 1 (1)
35. Old Fletton No. 2 (1)
36. Peterborough No. 1 (Central) (1)
37. Peterborough No. 2 (Dogsthorpe) (1)
38. Peterborough No. 3 (East) (1)
39. Peterborough No. 4 (Minster) (1)
40. Peterborough No. 5 (North) (1)
41. Peterborough No. 6 (Park) (1)
42. Peterborough No. 7 (Paston & Werr (1)
43. Peterborough No. 8 (South) (1)
44. Peterborough No. 9 (Westwood) (2)
45. Peterborough Rural (1)
46. Petersfield (1)
47. Ramsey (1)
48. Romsey (1)
49. South Cambridgeshire No. 1 (1)
50. South Cambridgeshire No. 2 (1)
51. South Cambridgeshire No. 3 (1)
52. South Cambridgeshire No. 4 (1)
53. South Cambridgeshire No. 5 (1)
54. St Ives (1)
55. St Ives Rural No. 1 (1)
56. St Ives Rural No. 2 (1)
57. St Neots No. 1 (1)
58. St Neots No. 2 (1)
59. St Neots Rural (1)
60. Thorney Rural (1)
61. Trumpington (1)
62. West Chesterton (1)
63. Whittlesey (1)
64. Wisbech No. 1 (1)
65. Wisbech No. 2 (1)
66. Wisbech Rural No. 1 (1)
67. Wisbech Rural No. 2 (1)

Electoral Divisions from 2 May 1985 to 5 May 2005:

1. Abbey (1)
2. Arbury (1)
3. Bassingbourn (1)
4. Benwick & Doddington (1)
5. Brampton (1)
6. Bretton (1)
7. Buckden (1)
8. Burwell (1)
9. Castle (1)
10. Chatteris (1)
11. Cherry Hinton (1)
12. Coleridge (1)
13. Comberton (1)
14. Cottenham (1)
15. Dogsthorpe (1); electoral division abolished in 1998
16. East Chesterton (1)
17. Eaton (1)
18. Elm (1)
19. Ely North & South (1)
20. Ely West (1)
21. Eynesbury (1)
22. Fletton (1); electoral division abolished in 1998
23. Fulbourn (1)
24. Gamlingay (1)
25. Girton (1)
26. Harston (1)
27. Histon (1)
28. Houghton & Wyton (1)
29. Huntingdon & Godmanchester (1)
30. Huntingdon North (1)
31. Kings Hedges (1)
32. Leverington (1)
33. Linton (1)
34. Littleport (1)
35. March East (1)
36. March West (1)
37. Market (1)
38. Melbourn (1)
39. Newnham (1)
40. Norman Cross (1)
41. Orton Longueville (1); electoral division abolished in 1998
42. Orton Waterville (1); electoral division abolished in 1998
43. Park (1); electoral division abolished in 1998
44. Paston (1); electoral division abolished in 1998
45. Peterborough Central (1); electoral division abolished in 1998
46. Peterborough East (1); electoral division abolished in 1998
47. Peterborough North (1); electoral division abolished in 1998
48. Peterborough Rural West (1); electoral division abolished in 1998
49. Peterborough West (1); electoral division abolished in 1998
50. Petersfield (1)
51. Priory Park (1)
52. Queen Ediths (1)
53. Ramsey (1)
54. Ravensthorpe (1); electoral division abolished in 1998
55. Romsey (1)
56. Sawston (1)
57. Sawtry (1)
58. Shelford (1)
59. Soham (1)
60. Somersham (1)
61. South Bretton (1); electoral division abolished in 1998
62. St Ives North & Warboys (1)
63. St Ives South (1)
64. Stanground (1); electoral division abolished in 1998
65. Sutton (1)
66. Thorney (1); electoral division abolished in 1998
67. Trumpington (1)
68. Walton (1); electoral division abolished in 1998
69. Waterbeach (1)
70. Werrington (1); electoral division abolished in 1998
71. West Chesterton (1)
72. West Hunts (1)
73. Whittlesey (1)
74. Willingham (1)
75. Wisbech North (1)
76. Wisbech South (1)
77. Woodditton (1)

Electoral Divisions from 5 May 2005 to 4 May 2017:

1. Abbey (1)
2. Arbury (1)
3. Bar Hill (1)
4. Bassingbourn (1)
5. Bourn (1) †
6. Brampton & Kimbolton (1) ‡
7. Buckden, Gransden & The Offords (1) ‡
8. Burwell (1)
9. Castle (1)
10. Chatteris (1)
11. Cherry Hinton (1)
12. Coleridge (1)
13. Cottenham, Histon & Impington (2)
14. Duxford (1)
15. East Chesterton (1)
16. Ely North & East (1)
17. Ely South & West (1)
18. Forty Foot (1)
19. Fulbourn (1)
20. Gamlingay (1)
21. Godmanchester (2); renamed Godmanchester & Huntingdon East in 2009
22. Haddenham (1)
23. Hardwick (1)
24. Huntingdon (2) ‡
25. King’s Hedges (1)
26. Linton (1)
27. Little Paxton & St Neots North (2) ‡
28. Littleport (1)
29. March East (1)
30. March North (1)
31. March West (1)
32. Market (1)
33. Melbourn (1)
34. Newnham (1)
35. Norman Cross (2)
36. Papworth & Swavesey (1) †
37. Petersfield (1)
38. Queen Edith's (1)
39. Ramsey (1) ‡
40. Roman Bank & Peckover (1)
41. Romsey (1)
42. Sawston (2)
43. Sawtry & Ellington (1) ‡
44. Soham & Fordham Villages (2)
45. Somersham & Earith (1) ‡
46. St Ives (2) ‡
47. St Neots Eaton Socon (2); renamed St Neots Eaton Socon & Eynesbury in 2009 ‡
48. Sutton (1)
49. The Hemingfords & Fenstanton (1) ‡
50. Trumpington (1)
51. Waldersey (1)
52. Warboys & Upwood (1) ‡
53. Waterbeach (1)
54. West Chesterton (1)
55. Whittlesey North (1)
56. Whittlesey South (1)
57. Willingham (1)
58. Wisbech North (1)
59. Wisbech South (1)
60. Woodditton (1)

† minor boundary changes in 2009 ‡ minor boundary changes in 2013

Electoral Divisions from 4 May 2017 to present:

City of Cambridge
1. Abbey (1)
2. Arbury (1)
3. Castle (1)
4. Cherry Hinton (1)
5. Chesterton (1)
6. King’s Hedges (1)
7. Market (1)
8. Newnham (1)
9. Petersfield (1)
10. Queen Edith’s (1)
11. Romsey (1)
12. Trumpington (1)

East Cambridgeshire District

1. Burwell (1)
2. Ely North (1)
3. Ely South (1)
4. Littleport (1)
5. Soham North & Isleham (1)
6. Soham South & Haddenham (1)
7. Sutton (1)
8. Woodditton

Fenland District

1. Chatteris (1)
2. March North & Waldersey (2)
3. March South & Rural (1)
4. Roman Bank & Peckover (1)
5. Whittlesey North (1)
6. Whittlesey South (1)
7. Wisbech East (1)
8. Wisbech West (1)

Huntingdonshire District

1. Alconbury & Kimbolton (1)
2. Brampton & Buckden (1)
3. Godmanchester & Huntingdon South (1)
4. Huntingdon North & Hartford (1)
5. Huntingdon West (1)
6. Ramsey & Bury (1)
7. St Ives North & Wyton (1)
8. St Ives South & Needingworth (1)
9. St Neots East & Gransden (1)
10. St Neots Eynesbury (1)
11. St Neots Priory Park & Little Paxton (1)
12. St Neots The Eatons (1)
13. Sawtry & Stilton (1)
14. Somersham & Earith (1)
15. The Hemingfords & Fenstanton (1)
16. Warboys & The Stukeleys (1)
17. Yaxley & Farcet (1)

South Cambridgeshire District

1. Bar Hill (1)
2. Cambourne (1)
3. Cottenham & Willingham (1)
4. Duxford (1)
5. Fulbourn (1)
6. Gamlingay (1)
7. Hardwick (1)
8. Histon & Impington (1)
9. Linton (1)
10. Longstanton, Northstowe & Over (1)
11. Melbourn & Bassingbourn (1)
12. Papworth & Swavesey (1)
13. Sawston & Shelford (2)
14. Waterbeach (1)

== Unitary authority council ==
=== Peterborough ===
Wards from 1 April 1974 (first election 7 June 1973) to 6 May 1976:

1. No. 1 (Peterborough: Paston & Werrington) (6)
2. No. 2 (Peterborough: West) (5)
3. No. 3 (Peterborough: Dogsthorpe) (5)
4. No. 4 (Peterborough: North) (3)
5. No. 5 (Peterborough: Park) (3)
6. No. 6 (Peterborough: East) (3)
7. No. 7 (Peterborough: Central) (2)
8. No. 8 (Peterborough: Minster) (2)
9. No. 9 (Peterborough: South) (2)
10. No. 10 (Fletton) (1)
11. No. 11 (New Stanground) (2)
12. No. 12 (Old Stanground) (2)
13. No. 13 (Woodston) (1)
14. No. 14 (Barnack) (1)
15. No. 15 (Wittering) (1)
16. No. 16 (Sutton) (1)
17. No. 18 (Glinton) (1)
18. No. 20 (Newborough) (1)
19. No. 21 (Thorney) (2)
20. No. 22 (Orton Longueville & Orton Waterville) (2)
21. Eye (1)
22. Northborough (1)

Wards from 6 May 1976 to 1 May 1997:

Wards due from 1 May 1997 (order revoked shortly before election):

1. Bretton (3)
2. Dogsthorpe (3)
3. Fletton (3)
4. Orton Longueville (3)
5. Orton Waterville (3)
6. Park (3)
7. Paston (3)
8. Peterborough Central (3)
9. Peterborough East (3)
10. Peterborough North (3)
11. Peterborough Rural West (3)
12. Peterborough West (3)
13. Ravensthorpe (3)
14. South Bretton (3)
15. Stanground (3)
16. Thorney (3)
17. Walton (3)
18. Werrington (3)

Wards from 1 May 1997 to 10 June 2004:

1. Barnack (1)
2. Central (3)
3. Dogsthorpe (3)
4. East (3)
5. Eye & Thorney (2)
6. Fletton (3)
7. Glinton (1)
8. Newborough (1)
9. North (2)
10. Northborough (1)
11. North Bretton (3)
12. Orton Longueville (3)
13. Orton Waterville (3)
14. Park (3)
15. Paston (3)
16. Ravensthorpe (3)
17. South Bretton (2)
18. South (2)
19. Stanground (3)
20. Walton (2)
21. Werrington North (3)
22. Werrington South (3)
23. West (3)
24. Wittering (1)

Wards from 10 June 2004 to 5 May 2016:

1. Barnack (1)
2. Bretton North (3)
3. Bretton South (1)
4. Central (3)
5. Dogsthorpe (3) †
6. East (3) †
7. Eye & Thorney (2) †
8. Fletton (3) †; renamed Fletton & Woodston in 2011
9. Glinton & Wittering (2)
10. Newborough (1) †
11. North (2)
12. Northborough (1)
13. Orton Longueville (3) †
14. Orton Waterville (3) †
15. Orton with Hampton (3) †
16. Park (3)
17. Paston (3) †
18. Ravensthorpe (2)
19. Stanground Central (3) †
20. Stanground East (1)
21. Walton (2)
22. Werrington North (3) †
23. Werrington South (3) †
24. West (3)

† minor boundary changes in 2007

Wards from 5 May 2016 to present:

1. Barnack (1)
2. Bretton (3)
3. Central (3)
4. Dogsthorpe (3)
5. East (3)
6. Eye, Thorney & Newborough (3)
7. Fletton & Stanground (3)
8. Fletton & Woodston (3)
9. Glinton & Castor (2)
10. Gunthorpe (3)
11. Hampton Vale (3)
12. Hargate & Hempsted (3)
13. North (3)
14. Orton Longueville (3)
15. Orton Waterville (3)
16. Park (3)
17. Paston & Walton (3)
18. Ravensthorpe (3)
19. Stanground South (3)
20. Werrington (3)
21. West (2)
22. Wittering (1)

== District councils ==
=== Cambridge ===
Wards from 1 April 1974 (first election 7 June 1973) to 6 May 1976:

1. Abbey (4)
2. Arbury (4)
3. Castle (3)
4. Cherry Hinton (5)
5. Coleridge (4)
6. East Chesterton (3)
7. Market (4)
8. Newnham (4)
9. Petersfield (2)
10. Romsey (3)
11. Trumpington (3)
12. West Chesterton (3)

Wards from 6 May 1976 to 10 June 2004:

Wards from 10 June 2004 to present (boundary changes in 2021):

1. Abbey (3)
2. Arbury (3)
3. Castle (3)
4. Cherry Hinton (3)
5. Coleridge (3)
6. East Chesterton (3)
7. King’s Hedges (3)
8. Market (3)
9. Newnham (3)
10. Petersfield (3)
11. Queen Edith's (3)
12. Romsey (3)
13. Trumpington (3)
14. West Chesterton (3)

=== East Cambridgeshire ===
Wards from 1 April 1974 (first election 7 June 1973) to 5 May 1983:

1. No. 1 (Ely Urban) (7)
2. No. 4 (Sutton) (1)
3. No. 5 (Downham) (1)
4. No. 7 (Mepal) (1)
5. No. 15 (Fordham) (1)
6. No. 18 (Chippenham) (1)
7. Bottisham (2)
8. Burwell (3)
9. Cheveley (2)
10. Dullingham Villages (1)
11. Haddenham (2)
12. Isleham (1)
13. Littleport (4)
14. Soham (4)
15. Stretham (1)
16. The Swaffhams (1)
17. Witchford (1)
18. Woodditton (1)

Wards from 5 May 1983 to 1 May 2003:

Wards from 1 May 2003 to 2 May 2019:

1. Bottisham (2)
2. Burwell (3)
3. Cheveley (2)
4. Downham Villages (2)
5. Dullingham Villages (1)
6. Ely East (2)
7. Ely North (3)
8. Ely South (2)
9. Ely West (2)
10. Fordham Villages (2)
11. Haddenham (3)
12. Isleham (1)
13. Littleport East (2)
14. Littleport West (2)
15. Soham North (2)
16. Soham South (3)
17. Stretham (2)
18. Sutton (2)
19. The Swaffhams (1)

Wards from 2 May 2019 to present:

1. Bottisham (2)
2. Burwell (2)
3. Downham Villages (1)
4. Ely East (2)
5. Ely North (2)
6. Ely West (3)
7. Fordham & Isleham (2)
8. Haddenham (1)
9. Littleport (3)
10. Soham North (2)
11. Soham South (2)
12. Stretham (2)
13. Sutton (2)
14. Woodditton (2)

=== Fenland ===
Wards from 1 April 1974 (first election 7 June 1973) to 6 May 1976:

1. No. 1 (Wisbech East) (4)
2. No. 2 (Wisbech North) (3)
3. No. 3 (Wisbech South & West) (3)
4. No. 4 (Chatteris) (4)
5. No. 5 (March Western) (4)
6. No. 6 (March Eastern) (5)
7. No. 7 (Whittlesey - East Central) (1)
8. No. 8 (Whittlesey - West Central) (1)
9. No. 9 (Whittlesey - Coates) (1)
10. No. 10 (Whittlesey - Ponders Bridge & Kingsmoor) (3)
11. Benwick & Doddington (1)
12. Elm (2)
13. Leverington (2)
14. Manea (1)
15. Newton & Tydd St Giles (1)
16. Outwell & Upwell (1)
17. Parson Drove & Wisbech St Mary (2)
18. Wimblington (1)

Wards from 6 May 1976 to 1 May 2003:

1. Benwick and Doddington (1)
2. Chatteris East (1)
3. Chatteris North (1)
4. Chatteris South (1)
5. Chatteris West (1)
6. Elm (2)
7. Leverington (2)
8. Manea (1)
9. March East (3)
10. March North (3)
11. March West (3)
12. Newton and Tydd St. Giles (1)
13. Outwell and Upwell (1)
14. Parson Drove and Wisbech St. Mary (2)
15. Whittlesey Bassenhally (1)
16. Whittlesey Central (1)
17. Whittlesey East (1)
18. Whittlesey Kingsmoor (1)
19. Whittlesey South (1)
20. Whitlesey West (1)
21. Wimblington (1)
22. Wisbech East (2)
23. Wisbech North (3)
24. Wisbech North-East (2)
25. Wisbech South-West (3)

Wards from 1 May 2003 to 7 May 2015:

1. Bassenhally (1)
2. Benwick, Coates & Eastrea (2)
3. Birch (1)
4. Clarkson (1)
5. Delph (1)
6. Doddington (1)
7. Elm & Christchurch (2)
8. Hill (2)
9. Kingsmoor (1)
10. Kirkgate (1)
11. Lattersey (1)
12. Manea (1)
13. March East (3)
14. March North (3)
15. March West (3)
16. Medworth (1)
17. Parson Drove & Wisbech St Mary (2)
18. Peckover (1)
19. Roman Bank (3)
20. Slade Lode (1)
21. Staithe (1)
22. St Andrews (1)
23. St Marys (1)
24. The Mills (1)
25. Waterlees (2)
26. Wenneye (1)
27. Wimblington (1)

Wards from 7 May 2015 to 4 May 2023:

1. Bassenhally (2)
2. Benwick, Coates & Eastrea (2)
3. Birch (1)
4. Clarkson (1)
5. Doddington & Wimblington (2)
6. Elm & Christchurch (2)
7. Kirkgate (1)
8. Lattersey (1)
9. Manea (1)
10. March East (3)
11. March North (3)
12. March West (3)
13. Medworth (1)
14. Octavia Hill (2)
15. Parson Drove & Wisbech St Mary (2)
16. Peckover (1)
17. Roman Bank (3)
18. Slade Lode (1)
19. St Andrews (1)
20. Staithe (1)
21. Stonald (1)
22. The Mills (1)
23. Waterlees Village (2)
24. Wenneye (1)

Wards from 4 May 2023 to present:

1. Chatteris North & Manea (3)
2. Chatteris South (3)
3. Doddington & Wimblington (2)
4. Elm & Christchurch (2)
5. Leverington & Wisbech Rural (3)
6. March East (3)
7. March North (3)
8. March South (2)
9. March West & Benwick (2)
10. Parson Drove & Wisbech St Mary (3)
11. Whittlesey East & Villages (3)
12. Whittlesey Lattersey (1)
13. Whittlesey North West (2)
14. Whittlesey South (2)
15. Wisbech North (1)
16. Wisbech Riverside (2)
17. Wisbech South (3)
18. Wisbech Walsoken & Waterlees (3)

=== Huntingdonshire ===
Wards from 1 April 1974 (first election 7 June 1973) to 6 May 1976:

1. No. 1 (Huntingdon North) (4)
2. No. 2 (Huntingdon South) (2)
3. No. 3 (Huntingdon West) (2)
4. No. 4 (St Ives) (4)
5. No. 6 (St Neots No. 1) (3)
6. No. 7 (St Neots No. 2) (3)
7. No. 8 (St Neots No. 3) (2)
8. No. 9 (Brampton & Ellington) (2)
9. No. 10 (Sawtry) (1)
10. No. 13 (Barham) (1)
11. No. 20 (Broughton) (1)
12. No. 27 (Warboys) (1)
13. No. 29 (Little Paxton) (1)
14. No. 32 (Staughton) (1)
15. Buckden (1)
16. Bury (1)
17. Earith (1)
18. Elton (1)
19. Farcet (1)
20. Fenstanton (1)
21. Gransden (1)
22. Hemingford Abbots & Hilton (1)
23. Hemingford Grey (1)
24. Houghton & Wyton (1)
25. Kimbolton (1)
26. Needingworth (1)
27. Ramsey (3)
28. Somersham (1)
29. Stilton (1)
30. The Offords (1)
31. The Stukeleys (1)
32. Upwood & The Raveleys (1)
33. Yaxley (2)

Wards from 6 May 1976 to 10 June 2004:

Wards from 10 June 2004 to 3 May 2018:

1. Alconbury & The Stukeleys (1)
2. Brampton (2)
3. Buckden (1)
4. Earith (2)
5. Ellington (1)
6. Elton & Folksworth (1)
7. Fenstanton (1)
8. Godmanchester (2)
9. Gransden & The Offords (2)
10. Huntingdon East (3)
11. Huntingdon North (2)
12. Huntingdon West (2)
13. Kimbolton & Staughton (1)
14. Little Paxton (1)
15. Ramsey (3)
16. St Ives East (2)
17. St Ives South (2)
18. St Ives West (1)
19. St Neots Eaton Ford (2)
20. St Neots Eaton Socon (2)
21. St Neots Eynesbury (3)
22. St Neots Priory Park (2)
23. Sawtry (2)
24. Somersham (2)
25. Stilton (1)
26. The Hemingfords (2)
27. Upwood & The Raveleys (1)
28. Warboys & Bury (2)
29. Yaxley & Farcet (3)

Wards from 3 May 2018 to present:

1. Alconbury (1)
2. Brampton (2)
3. Buckden (1)
4. Fenstanton (1)
5. Godmanchester & Hemingford Abbots (3)
6. Great Paxton (1)
7. Great Stauton (1)
8. Hemingford Grey & Houghton (2)
9. Holywell-cum-Needingworth (2)
10. Huntingdon East (2)
11. Huntingdon North (3)
12. Kimbolton (1)
13. Ramsey (3)
14. Sawtry (2)
15. Somersham (1)
16. St Ives East (2)
17. St Ives South (2)
18. St Ives West (1)
19. St Neots East (2)
20. St Neots Eatons (3)
21. St Neots Eynesbury (3)
22. St Neots Priory Park & Little Paxton (3)
23. Stilton, Folksworth & Washingley (2)
24. The Stukeleys (3)
25. Warboys (2)
26. Yaxley (3)

=== South Cambridgeshire ===
Wards from 1 April 1974 (first election 7 June 1973) to 6 May 1976:

1. No. 1 (Swavesey) (1)
2. No. 15 (Elsworth) (1)
3. No. 40 (Melbourn) (2)
4. No. 41 (Duxford & Ickleton) (1)
5. Abington (1)
6. Arrington (1)
7. Balsham (1)
8. Bar Hill (1)
9. Barrington & Shepreth (1)
10. Barton (1)
11. Bassingbourn (2)
12. Bourn (1)
13. Castle Camps (1)
14. Comberton (1)
15. Coton (1)
16. Cottenham (2)
17. Fowlmere & Foxton (1)
18. Fulbourn (2)
19. Gamlingay (1)
20. Girton (2)
21. Great Shelford (2)
22. Hardwick (1)
23. Harston (1)
24. Haslingfield (1)
25. Histon & Impington (3)
26. Linton (2)
27. Little Shelford (1)
28. Longstanton (1)
29. Meldreth (1)
30. Milton (1)
31. Orwell (1)
32. Over (1)
33. Papworth (1)
34. Sawston (3)
35. Stapleford (1)
36. Teversham (1)
37. The Mordens (1)
38. The Wilbrahams (1)
39. Waterbeach (2)
40. Whittlesford (1)
41. Willingham (1)

Wards from 6 May 1976 to 10 June 2004:

1. Abington (1)
2. Arrington (1)
3. Balsham (1)
4. Bar Hill (2)
5. Barrington & Shepreth (1)
6. Barton (1)
7. Bassingbourn (2)
8. Bourn (1)
9. Castle Camps (1)
10. Comberton (1)
11. Coton (1)
12. Cottenham (2)
13. Duxford (1)
14. Elsworth (1)
15. Foxton (1)
16. Fulbourn (2)
17. Gamlingay (1)
18. Girton (2)
19. Great Shelford (2)
20. Hardwick (1)
21. Harston (1)
22. Haslingfield (1)
23. Histon (3)
24. Ickleton (1)
25. Linton (2)
26. Little Shelford (1)
27. Longstanton (1)
28. Melbourn (2)
29. Meldreth (1)
30. Milton (1)
31. Orwell (1)
32. Over (1)
33. Papworth (1)
34. Sawston (3)
35. Stapleford (1)
36. Swavesey (1)
37. Teversham (1)
38. The Mordens (1)
39. The Wilbrahams (1)
40. Waterbeach (2)
41. Whittlesford (1)
42. Willingham (1)

Wards from 10 June 2004 to 3 May 2018:

1. Balsham (2)
2. Bar Hill (2)
3. Barton (1)
4. Bassingbourn (2)
5. Bourn (3) †
6. Caldecote (1)
7. Comberton (1)
8. Cottenham (3)
9. Duxford (1)
10. Fowlmere & Foxton (1)
11. Fulbourn (2)
12. Gamlingay (2)
13. Girton (2)
14. Hardwick (1)
15. Harston & Hauxton (1)
16. Haslingfield & The Eversdens (1)
17. Histon & Impington (3)
18. Linton (2)
19. Longstanton (1)
20. Melbourn (2)
21. Meldreth (1)
22. Milton (2)
23. Orwell & Barrington (1)
24. Papworth & Elsworth (2) †
25. Sawston (3)
26. Swavesey (1)
27. Teversham (1)
28. The Abingtons (1)
29. The Mordens (1)
30. The Shelfords & Stapleford (3)
31. The Wilbrahams (1)
32. Waterbeach (2)
33. Whittlesford (1)
34. Willingham & Over (3)

† minor boundary changes in 2008

Wards from 3 May 2018 to present:

1. Balsham (1)
2. Bar Hill (1)
3. Barrington (1)
4. Bassingbourn (1)
5. Caldecote (1)
6. Cambourne (3)
7. Caxton & Papworth (2)
8. Cottenham (2)
9. Duxford (1)
10. Fen Ditton & Fulbourn (3)
11. Foxton (1)
12. Gamlingay (1)
13. Girton (2)
14. Hardwick (1)
15. Harston & Comberton (3)
16. Histon & Impington (3)
17. Linton (2)
18. Longstanton (2)
19. Melbourn (2)
20. Milton & Waterbeach (3)
21. Over & Willingham (2)
22. Sawston (2)
23. Shelford (2)
24. Swavesey (1)
25. The Mordens (1)
26. Whittlesford (1)

== Electoral wards by constituency ==
Wards as they existed on 1 December 2020.

=== Cambridge ===
Cambridge: Abbey; Arbury; Castle; Coleridge; East Chesterton; King’s Hedges; Market; Newnham; Petersfield; Romsey; Trumpington; West Chesterton.

=== Ely and East Cambridgeshire ===
East Cambridgeshire: Bottisham; Burwell; Downham Villages; Ely East; Ely North; Ely West; Fordham & Isleham; Haddenham; Littleport; Soham North; Soham South; Stretham; Sutton; Woodditton.

South Cambridgeshire: Cottenham; Milton & Waterbeach.

=== Huntingdon ===
Huntingdonshire: Alconbury; Brampton; Buckden; Godmanchester & Hemingford Abbots; Great Staughton; Hemingford Grey & Houghton; Holywell-cum-Needingworth; Huntingdon East; Huntingdon North; Kimbolton; St. Ives East; St. Ives South; St. Ives West; Sawtry; Somersham; The Stukeleys; Warboys.

=== North East Cambridgeshire ===
Fenland: Bassenhally; Benwick, Coates & Eastrea; Birch; Clarkson; Doddington & Wimblington; Elm & Christchurch; Kirkgate; Lattersey; Manea; March East; March North; March West; Medworth; Octavia Hill; Parson Drove & Wisbech St Mary; Peckover; Roman Bank; Slade Lode; St Andrews; Staithe; Stonald; The Mills; Waterlees Village; Wenneye.

=== North West Cambridgeshire ===
Huntingdonshire: Ramsey; Stilton, Folksworth & Washingley; Yaxley.

Peterborough: Barnack; Fletton & Stanground; Fletton & Woodston; Glinton & Castor; Hampton Vale; Hargate & Hempsted; Orton Longueville; Orton Waterville; Stanground South; Wittering.

=== Peterborough ===
Peterborough: Bretton; Central; Dogsthorpe; East; Eye, Thorney & Newborough; Gunthorpe; North; Park; Paston & Walton; Ravensthorpe; Werrington; West.

=== South Cambridgeshire ===
Cambridge: Cherry Hinton; Queen Edith’s.

South Cambridgeshire: Balsham; Barrington; Bassingbourn; Duxford; Fen Ditton & Fulbourn; Foxton; Gamlingay; Hardwick; Harston & Comberton; Linton; Melbourn; Sawston; Shelford; The Mordens; Whittlesford.

=== St Neots and Mid Cambridgeshire ===
Huntingdonshire: Fenstanton; Great Paxton; St. Neots East; St. Neots Eatons; St. Neots Eynesbury; St. Neots Priory Park & Little Paxton.

South Cambridgeshire: Bar Hill; Caldecote; Cambourne; Caxton & Papworth; Girton; Histon & Impington; Longstanton; Over & Willingham; Swavesey.

== See also ==
- List of parliamentary constituencies in Cambridgeshire
