= Parliamentary constituencies in the East of England =

The region of the East of England is divided into 61 parliamentary constituencies which is made up of 14 borough constituencies and 47 county constituencies. Since the general election of July 2024, 27 are represented by Labour MPs, 23 by Conservative MPs, seven by Liberal Democrat MPs, one by a Reform UK MP, one by a Green MP, one by a Restore Britain MP and one by an independent MP.

== 2023 boundary changes ==
See 2023 Periodic Review of Westminster constituencies for further details.

Following the abandonment of the Sixth Periodic Review (the 2018 review), the Boundary Commission for England formally launched the 2023 Review on 5 January 2021. The Commission calculated that the number of seats to be allocated to the Eastern region would increase by 3, from 58 to 61. Initial proposals were published on 8 June 2021 and, following two periods of public consultation, revised proposals were published on 8 November 2022. The final proposals were published on 28 June 2023 and came into effect at the 2024 general election.

== Constituencies since 2024 ==
Conservative Labour Liberal Democrat Reform UK Green Restore Independent Count Binface

Constituency	Electorate	Majority	Member of Parliament	Nearest opposition	County	Map
Basildon and Billericay BC	76,873	20	Richard Holden	Alex Harrison	Essex	
Bedford BC	72,478	9,430	Mohammad Yasin	Pinder Chauhan	Bedfordshire	
Braintree CC	77,781	3,670	James Cleverly	Matthew Wright	Essex	
Brentwood and Ongar CC	75,352	5,980	Alex Burghart	Paul Godfrey	Essex	
Broadland and Fakenham CC	75,730	719	Jerome Mayhew	Iain Simpson	Norfolk	
Broxbourne BC	75,187	2,858	Lewis Cocking	Catherine Deakin	Hertfordshire	
Bury St Edmunds and Stowmarket CC	77,599	1,452	Peter Prinsley	Will Tanner	Suffolk	
Cambridge BC	70,315	11,078	Daniel Zeichner	Cheney Payne	Cambridgeshire	
Castle Point BC	70,967	3,251	Rebecca Harris	Keiron McGill	Essex	
Central Suffolk and North Ipswich CC	71,975	4,290	Patrick Spencer	Kevin Craig	Suffolk	
Chelmsford BC	76,972	4,753	Marie Goldman	Vicky Ford	Essex	
Clacton CC	78,703	12,784	Nigel Farage	Count Binface	Essex	
Colchester BC	78,662	8,250	Pam Cox	James Cracknell	Essex	
Dunstable and Leighton Buzzard CC	76,742	667	Alex Mayer	Andrew Selous	Bedfordshire	
Ely and East Cambridgeshire CC	79,112	495	Charlotte Cane	Lucy Frazer	Cambridgeshire	
Epping Forest CC	72,229	5,682	Neil Hudson	Rosalind Doré	Essex	
Great Yarmouth CC	73,317	1,426	Rupert Lowe	Keir Cozens	Norfolk	
Harlow CC	74,683	2,504	Chris Vince	Hannah Ellis	Essex	
Harpenden and Berkhamsted CC	72,242	10,708	Victoria Collins	Nigel Gardner	Hertfordshire	
Harwich and North Essex CC	76,579	1,162	Bernard Jenkin	Alex Diner	Essex	
Hemel Hempstead CC	71,038	4,857	David Taylor	Andrew Williams	Hertfordshire	
Hertford and Stortford CC	78,915	4,748	Josh Dean	Julie Marson	Hertfordshire	
Hertsmere CC	73,518	7,992	Oliver Dowden	Josh Tapper	Hertfordshire	
Hitchin CC	75,080	7,109	Alistair Strathern	Bim Afolami	Bedfordshire and Hertfordshire	
Huntingdon CC	79,074	1,499	Ben Obese-Jecty	Alex Bulat	Cambridgeshire	
Ipswich BC	76,319	8,213	Jack Abbott	Tom Hunt	Suffolk	
Lowestoft CC	74,332	2,016	Jess Asato	Peter Aldous	Suffolk	
Luton North BC	74,866	7,510	Sarah Owen	Jilleane Brown	Bedfordshire	
Luton South and South Bedfordshire CC	76,970	6,858	Rachel Hopkins	Mark Versallion	Bedfordshire	
Maldon CC	78,281	6,906	John Whittingdale	Pamela Walford	Essex	
Mid Bedfordshire CC	76,218	1,321	Blake Stephenson	Maahwish Mirza	Bedfordshire	
Mid Norfolk CC	75,238	3,054	George Freeman	Michael Rosen	Norfolk	
North Bedfordshire CC	78,850	5,414	Richard Fuller	Uday Nagaraju	Bedfordshire	
North East Cambridgeshire CC	71,511	7,189	Steve Barclay	Chris Thornhill	Cambridgeshire	
North East Hertfordshire CC	77,090	1,923	Chris Hinchliff	Nikki da Costa	Hertfordshire	
North Norfolk CC	71,438	2,585	Steffan Aquarone	Duncan Baker	Norfolk	
North West Cambridgeshire CC	75,915	39	Sam Carling	Shailesh Vara	Cambridgeshire	
North West Essex CC	79,824	2,610	Kemi Badenoch	Issy Waite	Essex	
North West Norfolk CC	74,415	4,954	James Wild	Tim Leaver	Norfolk	
Norwich North BC	73,834	10,850	Alice Macdonald	Charlotte Salomon	Norfolk	
Norwich South BC	76,381	13,239	Clive Lewis	Jamie Osborn	Norfolk	
Peterborough CC	73,378	118	Andrew Pakes	Paul Bristow	Cambridgeshire	
Rayleigh and Wickford CC	76,576	5,621	Mark Francois	Grant Randall	Essex	
South Basildon and East Thurrock CC	72,314	98	James McMurdock (Note: Elected from Reform UK in 2024, McMurdock left the party on 8 July 2025.)	Jack Ferguson	Essex	
South Cambridgeshire CC	77,327	10,641	Pippa Heylings	Chris Carter-Chapman	Cambridgeshire	
South Norfolk CC	74,135	2,826	Ben Goldsborough	Poppy Simister-Thomas	Norfolk	
South Suffolk CC	73,385	3,047	James Cartlidge	Emma Bishton	Suffolk	
South West Hertfordshire CC	71,353	4,456	Gagan Mohindra	Sally Symington	Hertfordshire	
South West Norfolk CC	74,724	630	Terry Jermy	Liz Truss	Norfolk	
Southend East and Rochford CC	70,217	4,027	Bayo Alaba	Gavin Haran	Essex	
Southend West and Leigh BC	75,154	1,949	David Burton-Sampson	Anna Firth	Essex	
St Albans CC	72,739	19,834	Daisy Cooper	James Spencer	Hertfordshire	
St Neots and Mid Cambridgeshire CC	78,115	4,648	Ian Sollom	Anthony Browne	Cambridgeshire	
Stevenage CC	70,086	6,618	Kevin Bonavia	Alex Clarkson	Hertfordshire	
Suffolk Coastal CC	74,522	1,070	Jenny Riddell-Carpenter	Thérèse Coffey	Suffolk	
Thurrock BC	73,405	6,474	Jen Craft	Sophie Preston-Hall	Essex	
Watford BC	73,000	4,723	Matt Turmaine	Dean Russell	Hertfordshire	
Waveney Valley CC	71,629	5,593	Adrian Ramsay	Richard Rout	Norfolk and Suffolk	
Welwyn Hatfield CC	75,259	3,799	Andrew Lewin	Grant Shapps	Hertfordshire	
West Suffolk CC	77,149	3,247	Nick Timothy	Rebecca Denness	Suffolk	
Witham CC	79,072	5,145	Priti Patel	Rumi Chowdhury	Essex	

== Constituencies until 2024 ==
† Conservative ‡ Labour ¤ Liberal Democrat

Constituency (Note: BC denotes borough constituency, CC denotes county constituency)	Electorate	Majority (Note: The majority is the number of votes the winning candidate receives more than their nearest rival)	Member of Parliament	Nearest opposition	County	Constituency Map
Basildon and Billericay BC	69,906	20,412	John Baron†	Andrew Gorgon‡	Essex	
Bedford BC	71,581	145	Mohammad Yasin‡	Ryan Henson†	Bedfordshire	A small constituency, located north of the centre of the county.
Braintree CC	75,208	24,673	James Cleverly†	Joshua Garfield‡	Essex	
Brentwood and Ongar CC	75,255	29,065	Alex Burghart†	Oliver Durose‡	Essex	
Broadland CC	78,151	21,861	Jerome Mayhew†	Jess Barnard‡	Norfolk	
Broxbourne BC	73,182	19,807	Charles Walker†	Sean Waters‡	Hertfordshire	A fairly small constituency in the southeast part of the county.
Bury St Edmunds CC	89,644	24,988	Jo Churchill†	Cliff Waterman‡	Suffolk	
Cambridge BC	79,951	9,639	Daniel Zeichner‡	Rod Cantrill¤	Cambridgeshire	A small constituency, located in the centre of the county.
Castle Point BC	69,608	26,634	Rebecca Harris†	Katie Curtis‡	Essex	
Central Suffolk and North Ipswich CC	80,037	23,391	Dan Poulter‡ (Note: Elected as a Conservative in 2010, Poulter defected to Labour on 27 April 2024.)	Emma Bonner-Morgan‡	Suffolk	
Chelmsford BC	80,394	17,621	Vicky Ford†	Marie Goldman¤	Essex	
Clacton CC	70,930	24,702	Giles Watling†	Kevin Bonavia‡	Essex	
Colchester BC	82,625	9,423	Will Quince†	Tina McKay‡	Essex	
Epping Forest CC	74,304	22,173	Eleanor Laing†	Vicky Ashworth Te Velde‡	Essex	
Great Yarmouth CC	71,957	17,663	Brandon Lewis†	Mike Smith-Clare‡	Norfolk	
Harlow CC	68,078	14,063	Robert Halfon†	Laura McAlpine‡	Essex	
Harwich and North Essex CC	74,153	20,182	Bernard Jenkin†	Stephen Rice‡	Essex	
Hemel Hempstead CC	74,035	14,563	Michael Penning†	Nabila Ahmed‡	Hertfordshire	A medium-sized constituency. It is slightly to the northwest of the centre of the county.
Hertford and Stortford CC	81,765	19,620	Julie Marson†	Chris Vince‡	Hertfordshire	A medium-sized constituency located in the east of the county.
Hertsmere CC	73,971	21,313	Oliver Dowden†	Holly Kal-Weiss‡	Hertfordshire	A small-to-medium sized constituency, located in the south of the county.
Hitchin and Harpenden CC	76,323	6,895	Bim Afolami†	Sam Collins¤	Hertfordshire	A fairly large constituency, stretching from the centre of the county northwards.
Huntingdon CC	84,657	19,383	Jonathan Djanogly†	Samuel Sweek‡	Cambridgeshire	A medium constituency in the southwest of the county.
Ipswich BC	75,525	5,479	Tom Hunt†	Sandy Martin‡	Suffolk	
Luton North BC	68,185	9,247	Sarah Owen‡	Jeet Bains†	Bedfordshire	A small constituency south of the centre of the county.
Luton South BC	69,338	8,756	Rachel Hopkins‡	Parvez Akhtar†	Bedfordshire	A small constituency, located in the southwest of the county.
Maldon CC	72,438	30,041	John Whittingdale†	Stephen Capper‡	Essex	
Mid Bedfordshire CC	40,720 (2023)	1,192 (2023)	Alistair Strathern‡	Festus Akinbusoye†	Bedfordshire	A large constituency, occupying the centre of the county.
Mid Norfolk CC	82,203	22,594	George Freeman†	Adrian Heald‡	Norfolk	
North East Bedfordshire CC	90,678	24,283	Richard Fuller†	Julian Vaughan ‡	Bedfordshire	A large constituency in the north of the county.
North East Cambridgeshire CC	83,699	29,993	Steve Barclay†	Diane Boyd‡	Cambridgeshire	A large constituency, located in the northeast of the county.
North East Hertfordshire CC	76,123	18,189	Oliver Heald†	Kelley Green‡	Hertfordshire	The largest constituency in the county, primarily located in the northeast of the county. Its northernmost parts are considerably further north than constituencies in the west.
North Norfolk CC	70,729	14,395	Duncan Baker†	Karen Ward¤	Norfolk	
North West Cambridgeshire CC	94,909	25,983	Shailesh Vara†	Cathy Cordiner-Achenbach‡	Cambridgeshire	A medium-to-large constituency, stretching from the centre of the county to the northwest.
North West Norfolk CC	72,080	19,922	James Wild†	Jo Rust‡	Norfolk	
Norwich North BC	67,172	4,738	Chloe Smith†	Karen Davis‡	Norfolk	
Norwich South BC	77,845	12,760	Clive Lewis‡	Mike Spencer†	Norfolk	
Peterborough BC	72,560	2580	Paul Bristow†	Lisa Forbes‡	Cambridgeshire	A small constituency in the northwest of the county.
Rayleigh and Wickford CC	78,930	31,000	Mark Francois†	David Flack‡	Essex	
Rochford and Southend East CC	75,624	12,246	James Duddridge†	Ashley Dalton‡	Essex	
Saffron Walden CC	87,017	27,594	Kemi Badenoch†	Mike Hibbs¤	Essex	
South Basildon and East Thurrock CC	74,441	19,922	Stephen Metcalfe†	Jack Ferguson‡	Essex	
South Cambridgeshire CC	87,288	2,904	Anthony Browne†	Ian Sollom¤	Cambridgeshire	A medium constituency in the south of the county.
South East Cambridgeshire CC	86,769	11,490	Lucy Frazer†	Pippa Heylings¤	Cambridgeshire	A large constituency, situated in the southeast of the county.
South Norfolk CC	86,214	21,275	Richard Bacon†	Beth Jones‡	Norfolk	
South Suffolk CC	76,201	22,897	James Cartlidge†	Elizabeth Hughes‡	Suffolk	
South West Bedfordshire CC	79,926	18,583	Andrew Selous†	Callum Anderson‡	Bedfordshire	A medium constituency in the southwest of the county.
South West Hertfordshire CC	80,499	14,408	Gagan Mohindra†	David Gauke#	Hertfordshire	A medium sized constituency. It is long and thin in shape, stretching from the northwest to the southwest of the county.
South West Norfolk CC	78,455	26,195	Elizabeth Truss†	Emily Blake‡	Norfolk	
Southend West BC	66,354	12,792	Anna Firth†	Jason Pilley#	Essex	
St Albans CC	73,727	6,293	Daisy Cooper¤	Anne Main†	Hertfordshire	A small-to-medium sized constituency, slightly west of the centre of the county. It is bordered entirely by other constituencies in the county.
Stevenage CC	71,562	8,562	Stephen McPartland†	Jill Borcherds‡	Hertfordshire	A small constituency located slightly north of the centre of the county. It is bordered exclusively by other constituencies in the county.
Suffolk Coastal CC	81,910	20,533	Thérèse Coffey†	Cameron Matthews‡	Suffolk	
Thurrock BC	79,659	11,482	Jackie Doyle-Price†	John Kent‡	Essex	
Watford BC	83,359	4,433	Dean Russell†	Chris Ostrowski‡	Hertfordshire	A small constituency, southwest of the centre of the county.
Waveney CC	82,791	18,002	Peter Aldous†	Sonia Barker‡	Suffolk	
Welwyn Hatfield CC	74,892	10,955	Grant Shapps†	Rosie Newbigging‡	Hertfordshire	A medium sized constituency at the centre of the county. It is entirely bounded by other constituencies in the county.
West Suffolk CC	80,193	23,194	Matthew Hancock†	Claire Unwin‡	Suffolk	
Witham CC	70,402	24,082	Priti Patel†	Martin Edobor‡	Essex	

== 2024 results ==
The number of votes cast for each political party who fielded candidates in constituencies in the East of England region in the 2024 general election were as follows:

Party	Votes	%	Change from 2019	Seats	Change from 2019 (actual)	Change from 2019 (notional)
Conservative	869,447	30.6	▼26.6	23	▼29	▼32
Labour	834,896	29.4	▲5.0	27	▲22	▲22
Reform UK	496,237	17.5	▲17.1	3	▲3	▲3
Liberal Democrats	375,642	13.2	▼0.2	7	▲6	▲6
Green	195,665	6.9	▲3.9	1	▲1	▲1
Others	67,432	2.4	▲0.8	0	0	0
Total	2,839,319	100.0		61	▲3	

== Results history ==
Primary data source: House of Commons research briefing - General election results from 1918 to 2019 (2024 as above)

=== Percentage votes ===
East of England votes % 1945-2024

Key:

- CON - Conservative Party, including National Liberal Party up to 1966
- LAB - Labour Party, including Labour and Co-operative Party
- LIB - Liberal Party up to 1979; SDP-Liberal Alliance 1983 & 1987; Liberal Democrats from 1992
- UKIP - UK Independence Party 2010 to 2017 (included in Other up to 2005 and from 2019)
- REF - Reform UK (Brexit Party in 2019)
- GRN - Green Party of England and Wales (included in Other up to 2005)

=== Seats ===
East of England seats 1945-2024

Key:

- CON - Conservative Party, including National Liberal Party up to 1966
- LAB - Labour Party, including Labour and Co-operative Party
- LIB - Liberal Party up to 1979; SDP-Liberal Alliance 1983 & 1987; Liberal Democrats from 1992
- REF - Reform UK
- GRN - Green Party of England and Wales
- OTH - 1945 - Common Wealth Party (unopposed by Labour); 2015 - UK Independence Party

=== Maps ===
2024

== See also ==
- List of United Kingdom Parliament constituencies
- Parliamentary constituencies in Bedfordshire
- Parliamentary constituencies in Cambridgeshire
- Parliamentary constituencies in Essex
- Parliamentary constituencies in Hertfordshire
- Parliamentary constituencies in Norfolk
- Parliamentary constituencies in Suffolk
