= Parliamentary constituencies in Cambridgeshire =

Location of the county of Cambridgeshire (red) and the Peterborough unitary authority (orange) in England.

The ceremonial county of Cambridgeshire (which includes the area of the Peterborough unitary authority) is divided into eight parliamentary constituencies. There is one borough constituency and seven county constituencies, which each elect one Member of Parliament to represent it in the Parliament of the United Kingdom.

== Constituencies ==
† Conservative ‡ Labour ¤ Liberal Democrat ± Reform

Constituency (Note: BC denotes borough constituency, CC denotes county constituency.)	Electorate	Majority (Note: The majority is the number of votes the winning candidate receives more than their nearest rival.)	Member of Parliament	Nearest opposition (Note: As of the 2024 general election.)	Electoral wards	Map
Cambridge BC	70,321	11,078	Daniel Zeichner ‡	Cheney Payne ¤	Cambridge City Council: Abbey, Arbury, Castle, Coleridge, East Chesterton, King's Hedges, Market, Newnham, Petersfield, Romsey, Trumpington, West Chesterton.	Map showing the location of the Cambridge constituency in Cambridgeshire, under the boundaries created by the 2023 boundary review and first used at the 2024 UK general election
Ely and East Cambridgeshire CC	79,112	495	Charlotte Cane ¤	Lucy Frazer †	East Cambridgeshire District Council: Bottisham, Burwell, Downham Villages, Ely East, Ely North, Ely West, Fordham & Isleham, Haddenham, Littleport, Soham North, Soham South, Stretham, Sutton, Wodditton. South Cambridgeshire District Council: Cottenham, Milton & Waterbeach.	Map showing the location of the Ely and East Cambridgeshire constituency in Cambridgeshire, under the boundaries created by the 2023 boundary review and first used at the 2024 UK general election.
Huntingdon CC	79,074	1,499	Ben Obese-Jecty †	Alex Bulat ‡	Huntingdonshire District Council: Alconbury, Brampton, Buckden, Godmanchester & Hemingford Abbots, Great Staughton, Hemingford Grey & Houghton, Holywell-cum-Needingworth, Huntingdon East, Huntingdon North, Kimbolton, Sawtry, Somersham, St. Ives East, St. Ives South, St. Ives West, The Stukeleys, Warboys.	Map showing the location of the Huntingdon constituency in Cambridgeshire, under the boundaries created by the 2023 boundary review and first used at the 2024 UK general election.
North East Cambridgeshire CC	71,511	7,189	Steve Barclay †	Chris Thornhill ±	Fenland District Council: Bassenhally, Benwick, Coates & Eastrea, Birch, Clarkson, Doddington & Wimblington, Elm & Christchurch, Kirkgate, Lattersey, Manea, March East, March North, March West, Medworth, Octavia Hill, Parson Drove & Wisbech St. Mary, Peckover, Roman Bank, Slade Lode, St. Andrews, Staithe, Stonald, The Mills, Waterlees Village, Wenneye.	Map showing the location of the North East Cambridgeshire constituency in Cambridgeshire, under the boundaries created by the 2023 boundary review and first used at the 2024 UK general election.
North West Cambridgeshire CC	75,915	39	Sam Carling ‡	Shailesh Vara †	Huntingdonshire District Council: Ramsey, Stilton, Folksworth & Washingley, Yaxley. Peterborough City Council: Barnack, Fletton & Stanground, Fletton & Woodston, Glinton & Castor, Hampton Vale, Hargate & Hempsted, Orton Longueville, Orton Waterville, Stanground South, Wittering.	Map showing the location of the North West Cambridgeshire constituency in Cambridgeshire, under the boundaries created by the 2023 boundary review and first used at the 2024 UK general election.
Peterborough CC	73,378	118	Andrew Pakes ‡	Paul Bristow †	Peterborough City Council: Bretton, Central, Dogsthorpe, East, Eye, Thorney & Newborough, Gunthorpe, North, Park, Paston & Walton, Ravensthorpe, Werrington, West.	Map showing the location of the Peterborough constituency in Cambridgeshire, under the boundaries created by the 2023 boundary review and first used at the 2024 UK general election.
South Cambridgeshire CC	77,327	10,641	Pippa Heylings ¤	Chris Carter-Chapman †	Cambridge City Council: Cherry Hinton, Queen Edith's. South Cambridgeshire District Council: Balsham, Barrington, Bassingbourn, Duxford, Fen Ditton & Fulbourn, Foxton, Gamlingay, Hardwick, Harston & Comberton, Linton, Melbourn, Sawston, Shelford, The Mordens, Whittlesford.	Map showing the location of the South Cambridgeshire constituency in Cambridgeshire, under the boundaries created by the 2023 boundary review and first used at the 2024 UK general election.
St Neots and Mid Cambridgeshire CC	78,115	4,648	Ian Sollom ¤	Anthony Browne †	Huntingdonshire District Council: Fenstanton, Great Paxton, St. Neots East, St. Neots Eatons, St. Neots Eynesbury, St. Neots Priory Park & Little Paxton. South Cambridgeshire District Council: Bar Hill, Caldecote, Cambourne, Caxton & Papworth, Girton, Histon & Impington, Longstanton, Over & Willingham, Swavesey.	Map showing the location of the St Neots and Mid Cambridgeshire constituency in Cambridgeshire, under the boundaries created by the 2023 boundary review and first used at the 2024 UK general election.

== Boundary changes ==
=== 2024 ===
For the 2023 Periodic Review of Westminster constituencies, which redrew the constituency map ahead of the 2024 United Kingdom general election, the Boundary Commission for England retained Cambridgeshire as a sub-region of the East of England region, increasing the number of seats from seven to eight with the creation of St Neots and Mid Cambridgeshire. The town of St Neots was transferred from Huntingdon and the Mid Cambridgeshire areas, including the new towns of Cambourne and Northstowe, from South Cambridgeshire and South East Cambridgeshire. As a consequence, there were significant changes to the existing constituency boundaries, apart from Peterborough, which was largely unchanged. South East Cambridgeshire was renamed Ely and East Cambridgeshire.

Former name	Boundaries 2010–2024	Current name	Boundaries 2024–present
1. Cambridge BC; 2. Huntingdon CC; 3. North East Cambridgeshire CC; 4. North West Cambridgeshire CC; 5. Peterborough BC; 6. South Cambridgeshire CC; 7. South East Cambridgeshire CC		1. Cambridge BC; 2. Ely and East Cambridgeshire CC; 3. Huntingdon CC; 4. North East Cambridgeshire CC; 5. North West Cambridgeshire CC; 6. Peterborough CC; 7. South Cambridgeshire CC; 8. St Neots and Mid Cambridgeshire CC	Numbered map of the parliamentary constituencies of Cambridgeshire created by the 2023 boundary review and first used at the 2024 UK general election.

=== 2010 ===
The 2007 report of the Boundary Commission for England retained the same seven constituencies that had existed since the 1997 election, with minor boundary changes to align with current local government wards and to better equalise the electorates. These changes, which were implemented at the 2010 general election, included the transfer back of Thorney and Eye from North East Cambridgeshire to Peterborough, the return of the Cambridge ward of Trumpington from South Cambridgeshire to the Cambridge constituency, and small transfers of rural wards from North West Cambridgeshire to Huntingdon, and from South East Cambridgeshire to South Cambridgeshire.

Name	Boundaries 1997–2010	Boundaries 2010–2024
1. Cambridge BC; 2. Huntingdon CC; 3. North East Cambridgeshire CC; 4. North West Cambridgeshire CC; 5. Peterborough BC; 6. South Cambridgeshire CC; 7. South East Cambridgeshire CC		

== Results history ==
Primary data source: House of Commons research briefing - General election results from 1918 to 2019

=== 2024 ===
The number of votes cast for each political party who fielded candidates in constituencies comprising Cambridgeshire in the 2024 general election were as follows:

Party	Votes	%	Change from 2019	Seats	Change from 2019
Conservative	114,186	30.6%	▼19.5%	2	▼4
Labour	94,767	25.4%	▲1.1%	3	▲2
Liberal Democrats	83,359	22.4%	▲0.9%	3	▲3
Reform	41,173	11.0%	▲10.2%	0	0
Green	25,065	6.7%	▲4.3	0	0
Others	14,115	3.8%	▲2.9%	0	0
Total	372,665	100.0		8	

=== 2019 ===
The number of votes cast for each political party who fielded candidates in constituencies comprising Cambridgeshire in the 2019 general election were as follows:

Party	Votes	%	Change from 2017	Seats	Change from 2017
Conservative	204,994	50.1%	▲0.3%	6	▲
Labour	99,582	24.3%	▼9.5%	1	▼1
Liberal Democrats	87,890	21.5%	▲8.6%	0	0
Greens	9,959	2.4%	▲0.7%	0	0
Brexit	3,168	0.8%	new	0	0
Others	3,895	0.9%	▼0.9%	0	0
Total	409,488	100.0		7	

=== Percentage votes ===
Election year	1983	1987	1992	1997	2001	2005	2010	2015	2017	2019	2024
Conservative	51.0	53.1	54.5	42.0	42.9	42.8	45.0	45.6	49.8	50.1	30.6
Labour	17.0	18.5	23.3	34.5	32.3	25.8	16.2	21.6	33.8	24.3	25.4
Liberal Democrat^{1}	31.6	27.9	19.7	17.9	21.3	26.9	29.0	13.2	12.9	21.5	22.4
Reform^{2}	-	-	-	-	-	-	-	-	-	0.8	11.0
Green Party	-	*	*	*	*	*	1.8	4.7	1.7	2.4	6.7
UKIP	-	-	-	*	*	*	5.1	14.4	1.7	*	*
Other	0.4	0.6	2.5	5.6	3.6	4.5	2.9	0.4	0.1	0.9	3.8

^{1}1983 & 1987 - SDP-Liberal Alliance

^{2}As the Brexit Party in 2019

* Included in Other

=== Seats ===
Election year	1983	1987	1992	1997	2001	2005	2010	2015	2017	2019	2024
Labour	0	0	1	2	2	0	0	1	2	1	3
Liberal Democrat^{1}	1	0	0	0	0	1	1	0	0	0	3
Conservative	5	6	5	5	5	6	6	6	5	6	2
Total	6	6	6	7	7	7	7	7	7	7	8

^{1}1983 & 1987 - SDP-Liberal Alliance

=== Maps ===
==== 1885–1910 ====
1885

1886

1892

1895

1900

1906

Jan 1910

Dec 1910

==== 1918–1945 ====
1918

1922

1923

1924

1929

1931

1935

1945

==== 1950–1979 ====
1950

1951

1955

1959

1964

1966

1970

Feb 1974

Oct 1974

1979

==== 1983–present ====
1983

1987

1992

1997

2001

2005

2010

2015

2017

2019

2024

== Timeline ==
	1290 – 1295	1295 – 1541	1541 – 1603	1603 – 1885	1885 – 1918	1918 – 1950	1950 – 1983	1983 – 1997	1997 – 2024	2024 – present
Cambridge		1295 – present								
Cambridgeshire	1290 – 1885					1918 – 1983				
Chesterton					1885 – 1918					
Ely and East Cambridgeshire										2024 – present
Huntingdon		1295 – 1918						1983 – present		
Huntingdonshire	1290 – 1885					1918 – 1983				
Isle of Ely						1918 – 1983				
Newmarket					1885 – 1918					
North East Cambridgeshire								1983 – present		
North West Cambridgeshire									1997 – present	
Peterborough			1541 – present							
Ramsey					1885 – 1918					
South Cambridgeshire									1997 – present	
South East Cambridgeshire								1983 – 2024		
South West Cambridgeshire								1983 – 1997		
St Neots and Mid Cambridgeshire										2024 – present
Wisbech					1885 – 1918					

== Historical representation by party ==
A cell marked → (with a different colour background to the preceding cell) indicates that the previous MP continued to sit under a new party name.

=== 1852 to 1885 ===
Conservative Liberal Radical Whig

Constituency	1852	53	54	55	1857	57	1859	63	1865	66	1868	73	74	1874	74	76	77	79	1880	81	84
Cambridge	Macaulay		Adair		Macaulay				Forsyth	Gorst	Torrens			Marten					Fowler		
Cambridge	Astell		Mowatt		Steuart			Powell			Fowler			Smollett					Shield		
Cambridgeshire	Ball							Manners							Rodwell					Bulwer	
Cambridgeshire	Yorke								Royston				Yorke					Hicks			
Cambridgeshire	Manners				Adeane		→		Young		Brand										A. Thornhill
Huntingdon	Baring											Karslake				E. Montagu					R. Peel
Huntingdon	J. Peel																				
Huntingdonshire	E. Fellowes																		W. Fellowes		
Huntingdonshire	W. Mandeville			Rust			R. Montagu							Pelly			G. Mandeville		Gordon		
Huntingdonshire					Heathcote																

=== 1885 to 1918 ===
Conservative Liberal

Constituency	1885	1886	87	91	1892	1895	1900	03	1906	Jan 1910	Dec 1910	13	17
Cambridge	Uniacke-Penrose-Fitzgerald								Buckmaster	Paget			Geddes
Chesterton	Hall				Hoare	Greene			E. Montagu				
Huntingdon	Coote	Smith-Barry					G. Montagu		Whitbread	Cator			
Newmarket	Newnes					McCalmont		Rose		Verrall	Rose	Denison-Pender	
Ramsey	W. Fellowes		A. Fellowes						Boulton	Locker-Lampson			
Wisbech	Rigby	Selwyn		Brand		Giles	Brand		Beck	Primrose			Coote

=== 1918 to 1950 ===
Coalition Liberal (1918–1922) / National Liberal (1922–1923) Conservative Labour Liberal National Liberal (1931–1968)

Constituency	1918	22	1922	1923	1924	1929	31	1931	34	1935	1945
Cambridge	Geddes	Newton							Tufnell		Symonds
Cambridgeshire	Montagu		Gray	Briscoe							Stubbs
Huntingdonshire	Locker-Lampson		Murchison	Costello	Murchison	Peters	→				Renton
Isle of Ely	Coote		Coates	Mond	Lucas-Tooth	de Rothschild					Legge-Bourke

=== 1950 to 1983 ===
Conservative Labour Liberal National Liberal (1931–1968)

Constituency	1950	1951	1955	1959	61	1964	1966	67	68	1970	73	Feb 74	Oct 74	76	1979
Cambridge	Kerr						Davies	Lane						Rhodes James	
Cambridgeshire	Howard				Pym										
Huntingdonshire	Renton								→						Major
Isle of Ely	Legge-Bourke										Freud				
Peterborough^{1}												Nicholls	Ward		Mawhinney

^{1}transferred from Northamptonshire

=== 1983 to present ===
Change UK Conservative Independent Labour Liberal Liberal Democrats

Constituency	1983	1987	1992	1997	2001	2005	2010	2015	2017	18	19	19	2019	2024
Cambridge	Rhodes James		Campbell			Howarth	Huppert	Zeichner						
Peterborough	Mawhinney			Clark		Jackson			Onasanya	→	Forbes		Bristow	Pakes
Huntingdon	Major				Djanogly									Obese-Jecty
North East Cambridgeshire	Freud	Moss					Barclay							
SE Cambs / Ely & E Cambs (2024)	Pym	Paice						Frazer						Cane
SW Cambs / S Cambs (1997)	Grant			Lansley				Allen			→	→	Browne	Heylings
North West Cambridgeshire				Mawhinney		Vara								Carling
St Neots & Mid Cambridgeshire														Sollom

== See also ==
- List of parliamentary constituencies in the East of England (region)
- History of parliamentary constituencies and boundaries in Cambridgeshire
- Parliamentary representation from Cambridgeshire
- Parliamentary representation from Huntingdonshire
