= North West Cambridgeshire =

UK Parliament constituency (since 1997)

Coordinates: 52.54°N 0.26°W

- County constituency for the House of Commons
- Interactive map of boundaries since 2024
- Location within the East of England
- County: Cambridgeshire
- Electorate: 73,556 (March 2020)
- Major settlements: Peterborough (part), Yaxley, Ramsey

Current constituency
- Created: 1997
- Member of Parliament: Sam Carling (Labour)
- Created from: Huntingdon, Peterborough

North West Cambridgeshire is a county constituency represented in the House of Commons of the Parliament of the United Kingdom since 2024 by Sam Carling of the Labour Party. It elects one Member of Parliament (MP) by the first past the post system of election.

== Constituency profile ==
North West Cambridgeshire is a constituency in Cambridgeshire in the East of England. It covers the southern half of the city of Peterborough, that being the areas south of the River Nene, and the settlements to the south and west of the city including the town of Ramsey and the villages of Yaxley, Stilton, Wittering and Glinton.

Peterborough is a historic cathedral city that was an important national centre for the brickmaking industry during the 20th century. The city was designated a new town in 1967 leading to large-scale suburban development south of the River Nene which continued into the 21st century. Ramsey is centred on Ramsey Abbey which made the town a significant ecclesiastical centre. This constituency has average levels of wealth overall; there is some deprivation in the suburbs of Fletton and Orton whilst the rural towns and villages are more affluent. House prices across the constituency are generally lower than the regional and UK averages.

North West Cambridgeshire has an above-average proportion of working-age adults and low proportions of young adults and retirees. Residents have average levels of homeownership and high rates of household income. The child poverty rate is in line with the UK-wide figure. Residents generally have average levels of education and a high proportion work in the retail, transport and technology sectors. The percentage claiming unemployment benefits is similar to the rest of the country. White people made up 87% of the population at the 2021 census. Residents of non-British origin made up 25% of the population, including large Polish and Lithuanian communities.

At the local council level, the Peterborough suburbs are represented by a mixture of Reform UK, Conservative, Liberal Democrat, Green Party and independent councillors. Ramsey elected Reform UK representatives. Voters in North West Cambridgeshire strongly supported leaving the European Union in the 2016 referendum; an estimated 60% voted in favour of Brexit compared to the UK-wide figure of 52%.

== History ==
The seat was won upon its creation in 1997 by Sir Brian Mawhinney, former Conservative MP for Peterborough (which was gained at the same election by the Labour Party). He retired from the House of Commons in 2005 and was created Baron Mawhinney, of Peterborough in the county of Cambridgeshire. The Conservative Shailesh Vara represented the constituency from the 2005 general election until 2024. The seat changed hands to Labour's Sam Carling in the 2024 general election.

=== Withdrawn candidates in 2019 ===
Liam Round was selected to be the Brexit Party candidate, but he withdrew on 10 November. Peterborough City Councillor Ed Murphy was chosen as the Labour Party candidate, but was deselected by the party on 14 November after it was alleged, but not proven, that he had published tweets vilifying Israel.

=== New political makeup ===
There are 33 council seats across the revised constituency, 25 Unitary Authority Councillors (Peterborough), 8 Huntingdonshire Councillors.

Conservative 17 (9 in Peterborough, 8 in Huntingdonshire); Labour 2 (both in Peterborough); Liberal Democrat 3 (all in Peterborough); Green 3 (all in Peterborough); Independent 9 (8 in Peterborough, 1 in Huntingdonshire).

== Boundaries and boundary changes ==
=== Historic ===
==== 1997–2010 ====
- The District of Huntingdonshire wards of Bury, Earith, Elton, Farcet, Ramsey, Sawtry, Somersham, Stilton, Upwood and the Raveleys, Warboys, and Yaxley; and
- The City of Peterborough wards of Barnack, Fletton, Glinton, Northborough, Orton Longueville, Orton Waterville, Stanground, and Wittering.

The constituency was formed primarily from northern, rural parts of the Huntingdon constituency, including Ramsey, together with parts of Peterborough, comprising residential areas to the south of the River Nene (wards of Fletton, Orton Longueville, Orton Waterville and Stanground).

Map of boundaries 2010–2024

==== 2010–2024 ====
- The District of Huntingdonshire wards of Earith, Ellington, Elton and Folksworth, Ramsey, Sawtry, Somersham, Stilton, Upwood and the Raveleys, Warboys and Bury, and Yaxley and Farcet; and
- The City of Peterborough wards of Barnack, Fletton, Glinton and Wittering, Northborough, Orton Longueville, Orton Waterville, Orton with Hampton, Stanground Central, and Stanground East.

Following their review of parliamentary representation in Cambridgeshire in 2005, the Boundary Commission for England made minor alterations to the existing constituencies to deal with population changes, including a small further gain from Huntingdon. There were also marginal changes to take account of the redistribution of City of Peterborough wards. These changes increased the electorate from 69,082 to 73,648. On the enumeration date of 17 February 2000, the electoral quota for England was 69,934 voters per constituency.

=== Current ===
Further to the 2023 review of Westminster constituencies, the constituency, previously the highest populated in the United Kingdom, was downsized. This was also due to population growth in the middle and south of Cambridgeshire, necessitating the creation of the new St Neots and Mid Cambridgeshire seat, with the Huntingdon constituency absorbing many of Huntingdonshire District Council wards.

From the 2024 general election, the constituency is composed of the following wards (as they existed on 1 December 2020):

- Peterborough City Council: Barnack (one councillor), Fletton & Stanground (three councillors), Fletton & Woodston (three councillors), Glinton & Castor (two councillors), Hargate & Hempsted (three councillors), Hampton Vale (three councillors), Orton Longueville (three councillors), Orton Waterville (three councillors), Stanground South (three councillors) and Wittering (one councillor).
- Huntingdonshire District Council: Ramsey (three councillors), Stilton, Folksworth & Washingley (two councillors) and Yaxley (three councillors).

== Members of Parliament ==
Election	Member	Party
part of Huntingdon and Peterborough prior to 1997
1997	Brian Mawhinney	Conservative
2005	Shailesh Vara	Conservative
2024	Sam Carling	Labour

== Elections ==
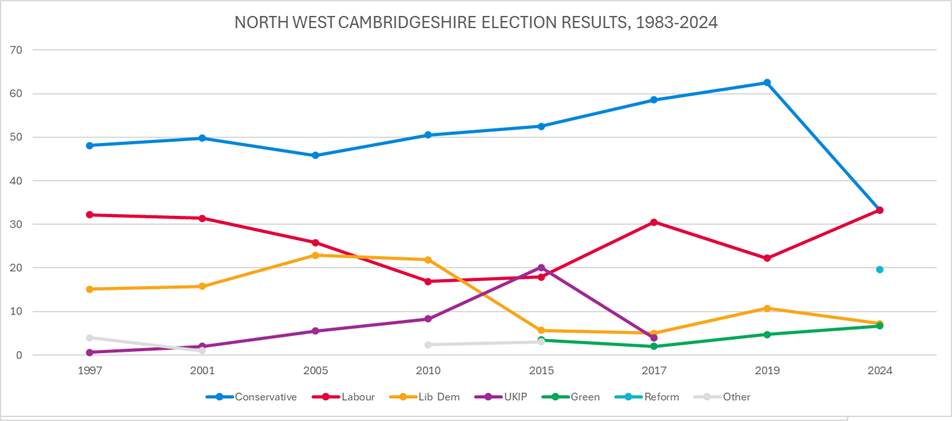
Election results 1997–2024

=== Elections in the 2020s ===
General election 2024: North West Cambridgeshire
Party	Candidate	Votes	%	±%
Labour	Sam Carling	14,785	33.3	+9.5
Conservative	Shailesh Vara	14,746	33.2	−26.8
Reform	James Sidlow	8,741	19.7	+19.6
Liberal Democrats	Bridget Smith	3,192	7.2	−3.8
Green	Elliot Tong	2,960	6.7	+1.4
Majority		39	0.1	N/A
Turnout		44,424	58.5	−5.4
Registered electors		75,915		
Labour gain from Conservative		Swing	+18.2	

=== Elections in the 2010s ===
2019 notional result
Party	Vote	%
Conservative	28,201	60.0
Labour	11,169	23.7
Liberal Democrats	5,173	11.0
Green	2,464	5.2
Brexit Party	25	0.1
Turnout	47,032	63.9
Electorate	73,556	

General election 2019: North West Cambridgeshire
Party	Candidate	Votes	%	±%
Conservative	Shailesh Vara	40,307	62.5	+3.8
Labour	Cathy Cordiner-Achenbach	14,324	22.2	−8.3
Liberal Democrats	Bridget Smith	6,881	10.7	+5.7
Green	Nicola Day	3,021	4.7	+2.7
Majority		25,983	40.3	+12.2
Turnout		64,533	68.0	−0.6
Registered electors		94,909		
Conservative hold		Swing	+6.1	

General election 2017: North West Cambridgeshire
Party	Candidate	Votes	%	±%
Conservative	Shailesh Vara	37,529	58.6	+6.2
Labour	Iain Ramsbottom	19,521	30.5	+12.6
Liberal Democrats	Bridget Smith	3,168	5.0	−0.7
UKIP	John Whitby	2,518	3.9	−16.2
Green	Greg Guthrie	1,255	2.0	−1.6
Majority		18,008	28.1	−4.3
Turnout		63,991	68.6	+2.1
Registered electors		93,223		
Conservative hold		Swing	−3.2	

General election 2015: North West Cambridgeshire
Party	Candidate	Votes	%	±%
Conservative	Shailesh Vara	32,070	52.5	+2.0
UKIP	Peter Reeve	12,275	20.1	+11.8
Labour	Nick Thulbourn	10,927	17.9	+0.9
Liberal Democrats	Nicholas Sandford	3,479	5.7	−16.2
Green	Nicola Day	2,159	3.5	New
CPA	Fay Belham	190	0.3	New
Majority		19,795	32.4	+3.8
Turnout		61,100	66.6	+1.0
Registered electors		91,783		
Conservative hold		Swing	−4.9	

General election 2010: North West Cambridgeshire
Party	Candidate	Votes	%	±%
Conservative	Shailesh Vara	29,425	50.5	+4.7
Liberal Democrats	Kevin Wilkins	12,748	21.9	−1.7
Labour	Chris York	9,877	16.9	−8.4
UKIP	Robert Brown	4,826	8.3	+3.0
English Democrat	Stephen Goldspink	1,407	2.4	New
Majority		16,677	28.6	+8.1
Turnout		58,283	65.6	+3.9
Registered electors		88,857		
Conservative hold		Swing	+3.2	

=== Elections in the 2000s ===
2005 notional result
Party	Vote	%
Conservative	23,953	45.8
Labour	13,238	25.3
Liberal Democrats	12,321	23.6
UKIP	2,777	5.3
Turnout	52,289	61.7
Electorate	84,808	

General election 2005: North West Cambridgeshire
Party	Candidate	Votes	%	±%
Conservative	Shailesh Vara	22,504	45.8	−4.0
Labour	Ayfer Orhan	12,671	25.8	−5.6
Liberal Democrats	John Souter	11,232	22.9	+7.1
UKIP	Robert Brown	2,685	5.5	+3.5
Majority		9,833	20.0	+1.6
Turnout		49,092	61.6	−0.7
Registered electors		79,694		
Conservative hold		Swing	+0.8	

General election 2001: North West Cambridgeshire
Party	Candidate	Votes	%	±%
Conservative	Brian Mawhinney	21,895	49.8	+1.7
Labour	Anthea Cox	13,794	31.4	−0.8
Liberal Democrats	Alastair Taylor	6,957	15.8	+0.7
UKIP	Barry Hudson	881	2.0	+1.5
Independent	David Hall	429	1.0	New
Majority		8,101	18.4	+2.5
Turnout		43,956	62.3	−11.9
Registered electors		70,569		
Conservative hold		Swing	+1.3	

=== Elections in the 1990s ===
General election 1997: North West Cambridgeshire
Party	Candidate	Votes	%	±%
Conservative	Brian Mawhinney	23,488	48.1	−14.2
Labour	Lee Steptoe	15,734	32.2	+6.3
Liberal Democrats	Barbara McCoy	7,388	15.1	+6.4
Referendum	Sandy Watts	1,939	4.0	New
UKIP	William Wyatt	269	0.6	New
Majority		7,754	15.9	−20.6
Turnout		48,818	74.2	−4.4
Registered electors		65,791		
Conservative hold		Swing	−10.3	

1992 notional result
Party	Vote	%
Conservative	32,170	62.4
Labour	13,361	25.9
Liberal Democrats	4,503	8.7
Others	1,559	3.0
Turnout	51,593	78.6
Electorate	65,640	

== See also ==
- Parliamentary constituencies in Cambridgeshire
- Parliamentary constituencies in the East of England
- Peterborough
- Huntingdon
