= St Neots and Mid Cambridgeshire =

UK Parliament constituency (since 2024)

Coordinates: 52.47°N 1.71°E

- County constituency for the House of Commons
- Interactive map of boundaries since 2024
- Location within the East of England
- County: Cambridgeshire
- Electorate: 74,699 (March 2020)
- Major settlements: St Neots, Cambourne, Northstowe, Longstanton

Current constituency
- Created: 2024
- Member of Parliament: Ian Sollom (Liberal Democrats)
- Seats: One
- Created from: Huntingdon, South Cambridgeshire, South East Cambridgeshire

St Neots and Mid Cambridgeshire is a constituency of the House of Commons in the UK Parliament. Following the completion of the 2023 review of Westminster constituencies, it was first contested at the 2024 general election, since when it has been represented by Ian Sollom of the Liberal Democrats.

== Constituency profile ==
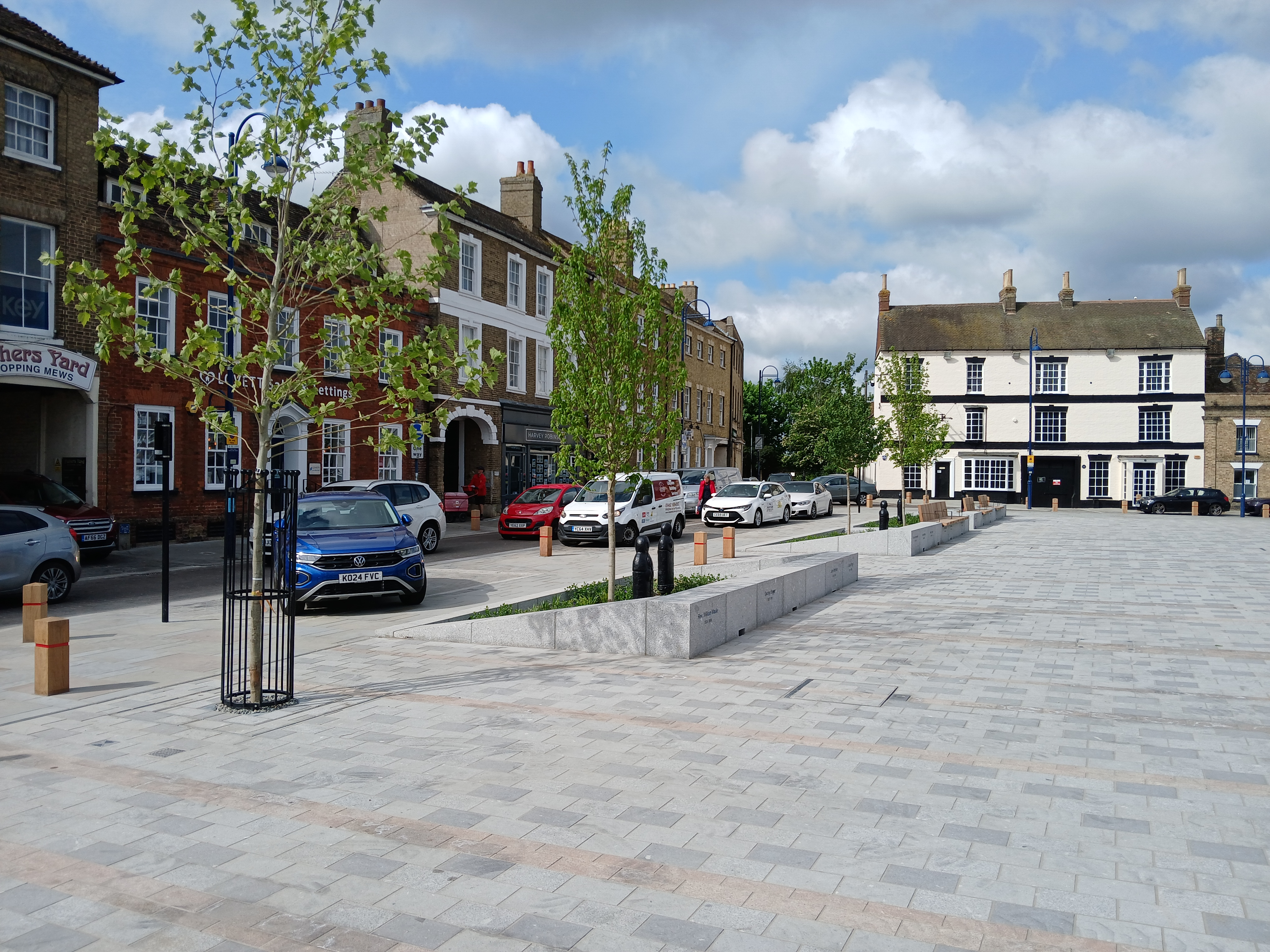
St Neots market place

St Neots and Mid Cambridgeshire is a constituency in Cambridgeshire in the East of England, covering parts of the South Cambridgeshire and Huntingdonshire districts. Its largest town is St Neots, which has a population of around 35,000. Other settlements include the towns of Cambourne and Northstowe and the villages of Little Paxton, Papworth Everard, Bar Hill, Girton, Histon, Longstanton, Fenstanton, Over and Willingham.

This is a mostly rural constituency covering the towns and villages to the north and west of Cambridge. St Neots is a historic market town on the River Great Ouse. The town was expanded in the 1960s to accommodate London overspill and further housing developments have been built in the 21st century. The same is true for many of the constituency's other settlements, especially those on the outskirts of Cambridge; Cambourne, Northstowe and Bar Hill are all planned communities with suburban-style developments. This constituency is highly-affluent with low levels of deprivation, and house prices are generally higher than the UK average.

St Neots and Mid Cambridgeshire has below-average proportions of young adults and retirees and a large population of middle-aged adults with families. Residents have high levels of income and homeownership, and the child poverty rate is less than half the overall UK figure. They are generally well-educated and a high proportion work in the manufacturing, education and construction sectors. The percentage of residents claiming unemployment benefits is low. White people made up 90% of the population at the 2021 census.

At the local council level, almost all seats in this constituency are represented by Liberal Democrats, with a small number of Reform UK and Green Party councillors elected in St Neots. An estimated 56% of voters in St Neots and Mid Cambridgeshire supported remaining in the European Union in the 2016 referendum, higher than the UK-wide figure of 48%.

== Boundaries ==
The constituency is composed of the following (as they existed on 1 December 2020):

- The District of Huntingdonshire wards of: Fenstanton; Great Paxton; St Neots East; St Neots Eatons; St Neots Eynesbury; St Neots Priory Park & Little Paxton.
- The District of South Cambridgeshire wards of: Bar Hill; Caldecote; Cambourne; Caxton & Papworth; Girton; Histon & Impington; Longstanton; Over & Willingham; Swavesey.

It covers the following areas:

- St Neots, transferred from Huntingdon
- Areas in Mid Cambridgeshire, including the new towns of Cambourne and Northstowe, transferred from South Cambridgeshire
- Histon & Impington and Over & Willingham, transferred from South East Cambridgeshire (abolished and replaced by Ely and East Cambridgeshire)

== Members of Parliament ==
Huntingdon and South Cambridgeshire prior to 2024

Election	Member	Party
2024	Ian Sollom	Liberal Democrats

== Elections ==
=== Elections in the 2020s ===
General election 2024: St Neots and Mid Cambridgeshire
Party	Candidate	Votes	%	±%
Liberal Democrats	Ian Sollom	19,517	36.9	+10.1
Conservative	Anthony Browne	14,896	28.2	−23.1
Labour	Marianna Masters	6,918	13.1	−5.7
Reform	Guy Lachlan	5,673	10.7	N/A
Independent	Stephen Ferguson	2,941	5.6	N/A
Green	Kathryn Fisher	2,663	5.0	+3.3
Party of Women	Bev White	274	0.5	N/A
Majority		4,648	8.7	
Turnout		52,882	67.7	
Liberal Democrats gain from Conservative		Swing		

== See also ==
- List of parliamentary constituencies in Cambridgeshire
- List of parliamentary constituencies in the East of England (region)
