= Malcolm Moss =

British politician

Parliamentary Under-Secretary of State for Northern Ireland
- In office 25 October 1994 – 2 May 1997
- Prime Minister: John Major
- Preceded by: Tim Smith
- Succeeded by: Tony Worthington

Member of Parliament for North East Cambridgeshire
- In office 11 June 1987 – 12 April 2010
- Preceded by: Clement Freud
- Succeeded by: Steve Barclay

Personal details
- Born: 6 March 1943 (age 83) Audenshaw, Lancashire, England
- Party: Conservative
- Spouse(s): Vivian Peake (m. 1965; died 1997) Sonya McFarlin (m. 2000)
- Children: 2
- Education: St John's College, Cambridge

Malcolm Douglas Moss (born 6 March 1943) is a British politician of the Conservative Party who served as the Member of Parliament (MP) for North East Cambridgeshire from 1987 until his retirement in the 2010 general election.

== Early life ==
Born in Audenshaw, Lancashire, he went to Audenshaw Grammar School on Stamford Road (now Audenshaw School) in Audenshaw (1954–1962), then St John's College, Cambridge, receiving a BA in 1965 then a Certificate in Education in 1967, and an MA in 1969. He taught Geography at Blundell's School in Tiverton (1966–1970), being Head of Geography and Economics from 1968 to 1970. From 1971 to 1974, he worked for Barwick Associates Ltd, being an insurance consultant from 1971 to 1972 in Worcestershire, then general manager from 1972 to 1974 in Wisbech. He founded Mandrake Associates Ltd (based in Wisbech) in 1974, being the director until November 1994. The company was taken over by Hambro Countrywide in November 1986. Hambro Countrywide became part of Chesnara in 2004.

He served as a member of Wisbech Town Council from 1979 to 1983, being Mayor from 1982 to 1983. From 1983 to 1987, he was a member of the Fenland District Council, then from 1985 to 1988 of the Cambridgeshire County Council.

== Parliamentary career ==
He was first elected in June 1987, beating the incumbent Liberal, Clement Freud.

He was a junior minister under John Major in the Northern Ireland Office. From October 1997 to November 1999 he was the Shadow Minister for Northern Ireland before being appointed Shadow Minister for Agriculture until October 2001. He served as the Shadow Minister for the Local Government and the Regions until June 2002, and Transport until October 2002. From then until November 2006, he was the Shadow Minister for Culture and Media, until being succeeded by Ed Vaizey. From November 2006 to May 2010 he was a member of the Foreign Affairs Committee.

On 6 September 2007, Moss announced his intention to stand down in the next general election. He was succeeded by Steve Barclay in the May 2010 general election.

== Personal life ==
He married Vivian Lorraine Peake on 28 December 1965, and they had two daughters. Lorraine died in 1997, and in May 2000 he married Sonya Alexandra McFarlin.

Parliament of the United Kingdom
Preceded by Clement Freud	Member of Parliament for North East Cambridgeshire; 1987–2010	Succeeded by Steve Barclay
