= Ian Sollom =

British politician

Ian Sollom MP
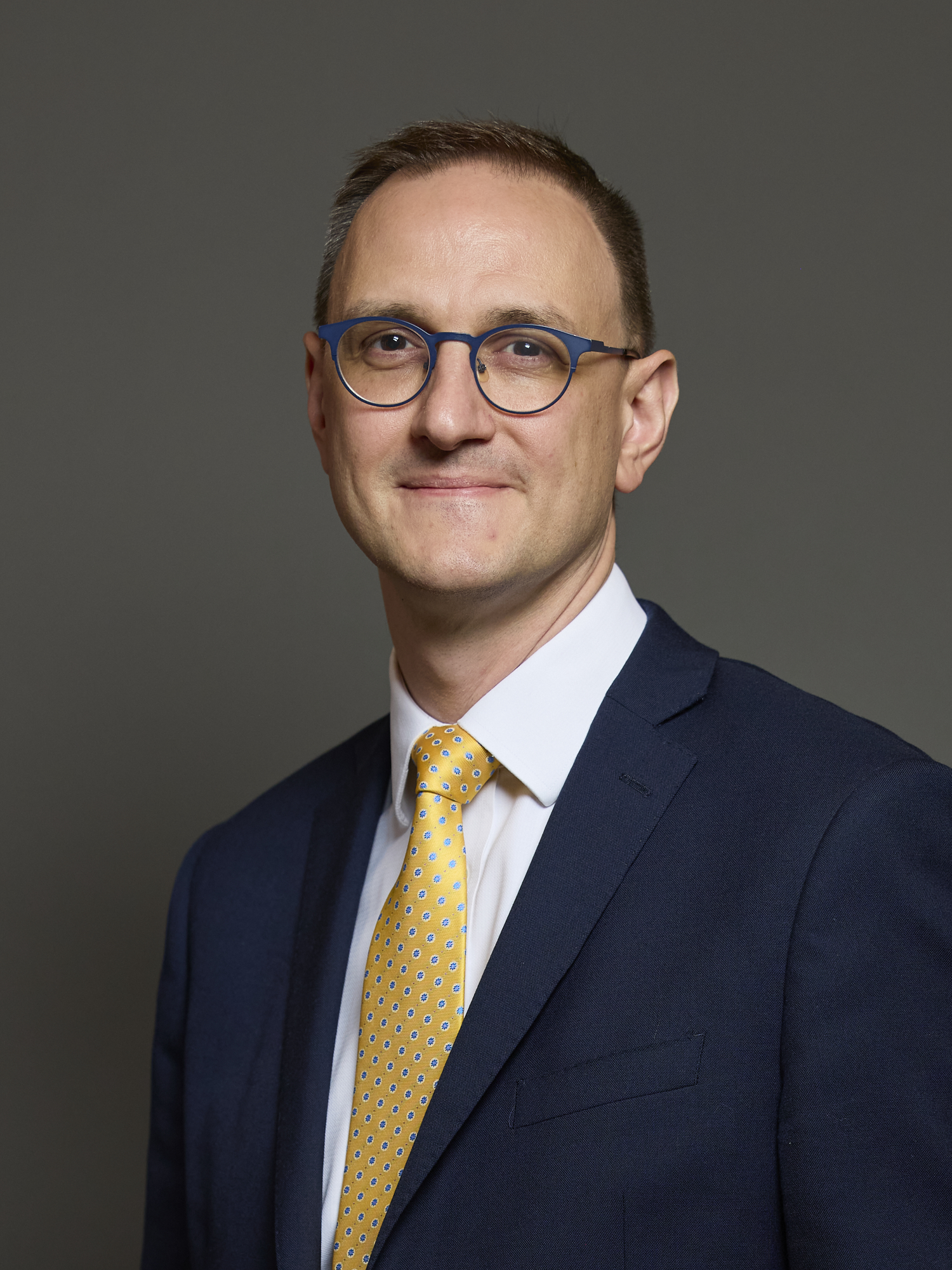
- Official portrait, 2024

Member of Parliament for St Neots and Mid Cambridgeshire
- Incumbent
- Assumed office 4 July 2024
- Preceded by: Constituency established
- Majority: 4,648 (8.7%)

Liberal Democrat spokesperson for Universities and Skills
- Incumbent
- Assumed office 18 September 2024
- Leader: Ed Davey

Member of South Cambridgeshire District Council for Harston and Comberton
- In office 7 May 2018 – 9 May 2022

Personal details
- Born: Ian Fraser Sollom
- Party: Liberal Democrats
- Education: St Hugh's College, Oxford (MPhys); Trinity College, Cambridge (PhD)

Academic background
- Thesis: Bayesian Analysis of the Cosmic Microwave Background Beyond the Concordance Model (2010)

Ian Fraser Sollom is a British Liberal Democrat politician who has been Member of Parliament (MP) for St Neots and Mid Cambridgeshire since the 2024 general election.

== Early life ==
Sollom grew up in rural Shropshire, and was educated at a local comprehensive school before attending sixth form at King Edward VI College, Stourbridge. He gained a Master of Physics (MPhys) degree from St Hugh's College, Oxford, followed by a PhD in cosmology from Trinity College, Cambridge.

== Career ==
Before being elected to Parliament, Sollom worked as a business consultant in the energy sector, and served as a Liberal Democrat councillor on South Cambridgeshire District Council for Harston and Comberton from 2018 to 2022. He was the Liberal Democrats' parliamentary candidate for South Cambridgeshire in the 2019 general election, coming second with 42 per cent of the vote.

Sollom was elected as the Member of Parliament for the constituency of St Neots and Mid Cambridgeshire in the 2024 general election, with 19,517 votes (36.9% of the vote) and a majority of 4,648 over second-placed candidate Anthony Browne, a Conservative. St Neots and Mid Cambridgeshire was a new constituency created by the 2023 review of Westminster constituencies—Browne was the incumbent MP for South Cambridgeshire, parts of which were removed to create the new seat. Sollom's victory represented a nominal Liberal Democrat gain from the Conservatives, in line with the massive swing away from the Conservatives nationwide.

== Personal life ==
Sollom is married to Bec. The couple first moved to Cambridge to pursue postgraduate studies in 2005. Their son, Erik, was born in 2012, and the family now live in St Neots.

Parliament of the United Kingdom
New constituency	Member of Parliament for St Neots and Mid Cambridgeshire; 2024–present	Incumbent
