= South West Cambridgeshire =

UK Parliament constituency (1983–1997)

- Former county constituency for the House of Commons
- Boundary of South West Cambridgeshire in Cambridgeshire for the 1992 general election

- Location of Cambridgeshire within England
- County: Cambridgeshire

1983–1997
- Seats: One
- Created from: Cambridgeshire, Huntingdonshire, Cambridge
- Replaced by: South Cambridgeshire, Huntingdon

South West Cambridgeshire was a United Kingdom Parliamentary constituency. Created in 1983 upon the abolition of the Cambridgeshire constituency, it was abolished in 1997 and succeeded by the constituencies of South Cambridgeshire and Huntingdon.

== Boundaries ==
- The District of South Cambridgeshire wards of Arrington, Barrington and Shepreth, Barton, Bassingbourn, Bourn, Comberton, Duxford, Foxton, Gamlingay, Great Shelford, Hardwick, Harston, Haslingfield, Ickleton, Little Shelford, Melbourn, Meldreth, Orwell, Papworth, Sawston, Stapleford, The Mordens, and Whittlesford;
- The District of Huntingdon wards of Buckden, Eaton Ford, Eaton Socon, Eynesbury, Gransden, Paxton, Priory Park, Staughton, and The Offords; and
- The City of Cambridge wards of Queen Edith's and Trumpington.

The seat was created for the 1983 general election which followed on from the merger under the Local Government Act 1972, of the two administrative counties of Huntingdon and Peterborough and Cambridgeshire and Isle of Ely to form the non-metropolitan county of Cambridgeshire, with effect from 1 April 1974. The constituency combined territory from three pre-1974 local authorities: the south west part of the abolished administrative county of Cambridgeshire; the south of Huntingdonshire, including St Neots; and two wards from Cambridge.

52.6% of the constituency came from the old administrative county and parliamentary constituency of Cambridgeshire, 29.7% originated from the former administrative county and county constituency of Huntingdonshire and the remaining 17.7% was transferred from the borough constituency of Cambridge.

The seat was abolished for the 1997 general election, as western parts, comprising the area formerly in Huntingdonshire was transferred to the Huntingdon constituency. Remaining, southern parts formed the bulk of the new County Constituency of South Cambridgeshire.

== Members of Parliament ==
Election	Member	Party
part of Cambridgeshire, Huntingdonshire and Cambridge prior to 1983
1983	Sir Anthony Grant	Conservative
1997	constituency abolished, part of S Cambs and Huntingdon from 1997	

== Elections ==
1979 notional result
Party	Vote	%
Conservative	31,289	56.6
Labour	13,890	25.1
Liberal	9,795	17.7
Others	284	0.5
Turnout	55,258	
Electorate		

=== Elections in the 1980s ===
General election 1983: South West Cambridgeshire
Party	Candidate	Votes	%	±%
Conservative	Anthony Grant	32,521	56.2	−0.4
Liberal	Derek Nicholls	18,654	32.2	+14.5
Labour	Joe Gluza	6,703	11.6	−13.6
Majority		13,867	24.0	−7.5
Turnout		57,878	75.9	
Registered electors		76,228		
Conservative win (new seat)				

General election 1987: South West Cambridgeshire
Party	Candidate	Votes	%	±%
Conservative	Anthony Grant	36,622	57.7	+1.5
Liberal	Derek Nicholls	18,371	29.0	−3.3
Labour	Judi Billing	8,434	13.3	+1.7
Majority		18,251	28.7	+4.8
Turnout		63,427	77.7	+1.8
Registered electors		81,658		
Conservative hold		Swing	+2.4	

=== Elections in the 1990s ===
General election 1992: South West Cambridgeshire
Party	Candidate	Votes	%	±%
Conservative	Anthony Grant	38,902	56.8	−0.9
Liberal Democrats	Sue Sutton	19,263	28.1	−0.8
Labour	Kevin Price	9,378	13.7	+0.4
Green	Linda Whitebread	699	1.0	New
Natural Law	Francis Chalmers	225	0.3	New
Majority		19,637	28.7	−0.1
Turnout		68,467	81.1	+3.4
Registered electors		84,418		
Conservative hold		Swing	±0.0	

== See also ==
- Parliamentary representation from Cambridgeshire
- List of former United Kingdom Parliament constituencies

== Sources ==
- Boundaries of Parliamentary Constituencies 1885-1972, compiled and edited by F.W.S. Craig (Parliamentary Reference Publications 1972)
- British Parliamentary Constituencies: A Statistical Compendium, by Ivor Crewe and Anthony Fox (Faber and Faber 1984)
