= North East Cambridgeshire =

UK Parliament constituency (since 1983)

Coordinates: 52.433°N 0.375°E

- County constituency for the House of Commons
- Interactive map of boundaries since 2024
- Location within the East of England
- County: Cambridgeshire
- Electorate: 70,806 (March 2020)
- Major settlements: Wisbech, March, Whittlesey and Chatteris

Current constituency
- Created: 1983
- Member of Parliament: Steve Barclay (Conservative)
- Created from: Isle of Ely; Peterborough

North East Cambridgeshire is a constituency (Note: A county constituency (for the purposes of election expenses and type of returning officer)) represented in the House of Commons of the UK Parliament since 2010 by Steve Barclay, a Conservative. (Note: As with all constituencies, the constituency elects one Member of Parliament (MP) by the first past the post system of election at least every five years.)

== Constituency profile ==
North East Cambridgeshire is a constituency in Cambridgeshire in the East of England. Its largest town is Wisbech, which has a population of around 27,000. Other settlements include the towns of March, Whittlesey and Chatteris and the villages of Leverington, Wisbech St Mary and Manea.

This constituency is mostly rural and located in the Fens, a low-lying region of marshland that was drained during the 18th century and has significant agriculture and food industries. Wisbech is an inland port on the River Nene and is an important local centre for agricultural trade and rural industry. Wisbech has high levels of deprivation whilst the rest of the constituency's settlements have average levels of wealth. Many residents commute to the nearby cities of Peterborough and Cambridge. House prices across the constituency are lower than the UK average and considerably lower than the rest of the East of England.

North East Cambridgeshire has a large retired population and a below-average proportion of working-age adults. Residents have very low levels of education, are likely to be religious and have average rates of homeownership. They have low levels of household income and high rates of child poverty. A high proportion of residents work in the manufacturing sector and few work in professional occupations. The percentage claiming unemployment benefits is in line with the nationwide figure. White people made up 96% of the population at the 2021 census. White people of non-British origin made up around 10% of the population; most of whom were from Eastern Europe with Lithuanians being the largest group.

At the local district council, most of the constituency is represented by Conservatives with a small number of Liberal Democrats and independents. At the county council, which held elections in 2025, most of the constituency elected Reform UK representatives. Voters in the constituency overwhelmingly voted in favour of leaving the European Union in the 2016 referendum; an estimated 71% voted in favour of Brexit compared to the UK-wide figure of 52%, making North East Cambridgeshire one of the top 15 most Brexit-supporting constituencies out of 650 nationwide according to Electoral Calculus.

== History ==
Clement Freud, former Liberal MP for Isle of Ely from 1973, represented the seat from its creation in 1983 until 1987, when he was defeated by the Conservative Malcolm Moss and since then it has been served by one other Conservative MP, namely Steve Barclay, first elected in 2010.

== Boundaries and boundary changes ==
=== Historic ===
==== 1983–1997 ====
- The District of Fenland;
- The District of East Cambridgeshire wards of Downham, Haddenham, Littleport, Stretham, Sutton, and Witchford; and
- The City of Peterborough wards of Eye, Newborough, and Thorney.

The seat was created for the 1983 general election which followed on from the merger under the Local Government Act 1972, of the two administrative counties of Huntingdon and Peterborough and Cambridgeshire and Isle of Ely to form the non-metropolitan county of Cambridgeshire, with effect from 1 April 1974. It was formed from the abolished constituency of Isle of Ely, with the exception of the city of Ely itself, which was included in the new constituency of South East Cambridgeshire. The three City of Peterborough wards were transferred from the constituency of Peterborough.

==== 1997–2010 ====
- The District of Fenland;
- The District of East Cambridgeshire wards of Downham, Littleport, and Sutton; and
- The City of Peterborough wards of Eye, Newborough, and Thorney.

Minor loss to South East Cambridgeshire.

Map of boundaries 2010–2024

==== 2010–2024 ====
- The District of Fenland; and
- The District of East Cambridgeshire wards of Downham Villages, Littleport East, Littleport West, and Sutton.

The City of Peterborough wards were returned to the constituency thereof. No other changes.

=== Current ===
Further to the 2023 review of Westminster constituencies, which came into effect for the 2024 general election, the composition of the constituency was reduced in size following the transfer of the parts in the District of East Cambridgeshire to the new seat of Ely and East Cambridgeshire. Its boundaries are therefore now coterminous with the District of Fenland.

== Members of Parliament ==
Election	Member	Party
Isle of Ely prior to 1983
1983	Clement Freud	Liberal
1987	Malcolm Moss	Conservative
2010	Steve Barclay	Conservative

== Elections ==
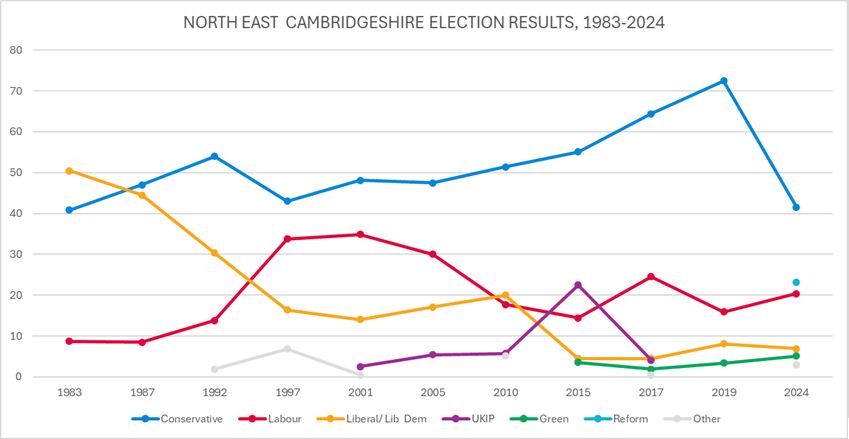
North East Cambridgeshire election results 1983–2024

=== Elections in the 2020s ===
General election 2024: North East Cambridgeshire
Party	Candidate	Votes	%	±%
Conservative	Steve Barclay	16,246	41.5	−32.4
Reform	Chris Thornhill	9,057	23.1	N/A
Labour	Javeria Hussain	8,008	20.4	+4.4
Liberal Democrats	David Chalmers	2,716	6.9	+0.2
Green	Andrew Crawford	2,001	5.1	+1.7
Independent	David Patrick	958	2.4	N/A
Workers Party	Clayton Payne	190	0.5	N/A
Majority		7,189	18.4	−38.2
Turnout		39,176	54.8	−8.2
Registered electors		71,511		
Conservative hold		Swing		

=== Elections in the 2010s ===
2019 notional result
Party	Vote	%
Conservative	32,934	73.9
Labour	7,155	16.0
Liberal Democrats	2,992	6.7
Green	1,503	3.4
Turnout	44,584	63.0
Electorate	70,806	

General election 2019: North East Cambridgeshire
Party	Candidate	Votes	%	±%
Conservative	Steve Barclay	38,423	72.5	+8.1
Labour	Diane Boyd	8,430	15.9	−8.6
Liberal Democrats	Rupert Moss-Eccardt	4,298	8.1	+3.6
Green	Ruth Johnson	1,813	3.4	+1.5
Majority		29,993	56.6	+16.7
Turnout		52,964	63.3	+0.2
Conservative hold		Swing	+8.4	

General election 2017: North East Cambridgeshire
Party	Candidate	Votes	%	±%
Conservative	Steve Barclay	34,340	64.4	+9.3
Labour	Ken Rustidge	13,070	24.5	+10.1
Liberal Democrats	Darren Fower	2,383	4.5	0.0
UKIP	Robin Talbot	2,174	4.1	−18.4
Green	Ruth Johnson	1,024	1.9	−1.6
English Democrat	Stephen Goldspink	293	0.5	N/A
Majority		21,270	39.9	+7.3
Turnout		53,284	63.1	+0.7
Conservative hold		Swing	−0.4	

General election 2015: North East Cambridgeshire
Party	Candidate	Votes	%	±%
Conservative	Steve Barclay	28,524	55.1	+3.7
UKIP	Andrew Charalambous	11,650	22.5	+16.8
Labour	Ken Rustidge	7,476	14.4	−3.3
Liberal Democrats	Lucy Nethsingha	2,314	4.5	−15.5
Green	Helen Scott-Daniels	1,816	3.5	N/A
Majority		16,874	32.6	+1.2
Turnout		51,780	62.4	−9.0
Conservative hold		Swing	−6.8	

General election 2010: North East Cambridgeshire
Party	Candidate	Votes	%	±%
Conservative	Steve Barclay	26,862	51.4	+4.5
Liberal Democrats	Lorna Spenceley	10,437	20.0	+2.9
Labour	Peter Roberts	9,274	17.7	−12.9
UKIP	Robin Talbot	2,991	5.7	+0.4
BNP	Susan Clapp	1,747	3.3	N/A
Independent	Debra Jordan	566	1.1	N/A
English Democrat	Graham Murphy	387	0.7	N/A
Majority		16,425	31.4	+13.9
Turnout		52,264	71.4	+12.2
Conservative hold		Swing	+0.8	

=== Elections in the 2000s ===
General election 2005: North East Cambridgeshire
Party	Candidate	Votes	%	±%
Conservative	Malcolm Moss	24,181	47.5	−0.6
Labour	Ffinlo Costain	15,280	30.0	−4.9
Liberal Democrats	Alan Dean	8,693	17.1	+3.1
UKIP	Len Baynes	2,723	5.4	+2.9
Majority		8,901	17.5	+4.3
Turnout		50,877	59.8	−0.3
Conservative hold		Swing	+2.1	

General election 2001: North East Cambridgeshire
Party	Candidate	Votes	%	±%
Conservative	Malcolm Moss	23,132	48.1	+5.1
Labour	Dil Owen	16,759	34.9	+1.1
Liberal Democrats	Richard Renaut	6,733	14.0	−2.4
UKIP	John Stevens	1,189	2.5	N/A
ProLife Alliance	Tony Hoey	238	0.5	N/A
Majority		6,373	13.2	+4.0
Turnout		48,051	60.1	−12.5
Conservative hold		Swing	+2.1	

=== Elections in the 1990s ===
General election 1997: North East Cambridgeshire
Party	Candidate	Votes	%	±%
Conservative	Malcolm Moss	23,855	43.0	−11.0
Labour	Virginia Bucknor	18,754	33.8	+20.0
Liberal Democrats	Andrew Nash	9,070	16.4	−13.9
Referendum	Michael W. Bacon	2,636	4.8	N/A
Socialist Labour	Chris J. Bennett	851	1.5	N/A
Natural Law	Luke K.C. Leighton	259	0.5	+0.2
Majority		5,101	9.2	−14.5
Turnout		55,425	72.6	−6.7
Conservative hold		Swing	−15.5	

General election 1992: North East Cambridgeshire
Party	Candidate	Votes	%	±%
Conservative	Malcolm Moss	34,288	54.0	+7.0
Liberal Democrats	Maurice Leeke	19,195	30.3	−14.2
Labour	Ronald Harris	8,746	13.8	+5.3
Liberal	Chris D. Ash	998	1.6	N/A
Natural Law	Marion Chalmers	227	0.3	N/A
Majority		15,093	23.7	+21.2
Turnout		63,454	79.3	+1.9
Conservative hold		Swing	+10.6	

=== Elections in the 1980s ===
General election 1987: North East Cambridgeshire
Party	Candidate	Votes	%	±%
Conservative	Malcolm Moss	26,983	47.0	+6.2
Liberal (Alliance)	Clement Freud	25,555	44.5	−6.0
Labour	Ronald Harris	4,891	8.5	−0.2
Majority		1,428	2.5	N/A
Turnout		57,429	77.4	+1.1
Conservative gain from Liberal		Swing	+6.1	

General election 1983: North East Cambridgeshire
Party	Candidate	Votes	%	±%
Liberal (Alliance)	Clement Freud	26,936	50.5	
Conservative	Nicholas Duval	21,741	40.8	
Labour	Ronald Harris	4,625	8.7	
Majority		5,195	9.7	
Turnout		53,302	76.3	
Liberal win (new seat)				

== See also ==
- List of parliamentary constituencies in Cambridgeshire
- List of parliamentary constituencies in the East of England (region)
