= South Cambridgeshire (constituency) =

UK Parliament constituency (since 1997)

Coordinates: 52.120°N 0.154°E

- County constituency for the House of Commons
- Interactive map of boundaries since 2024
- Location within the East of England
- County: Cambridgeshire
- Electorate: 75,484 (March 2020)
- Major settlements: Linton; Melbourn; Sawston

Current constituency
- Created: 1997
- Member of Parliament: Pippa Heylings (Liberal Democrats)
- Seats: One
- Created from: South West Cambridgeshire (most) South East Cambridgeshire (part)

South Cambridgeshire is a constituency (Note: A county constituency (for the purposes of election expenses and type of returning officer)) represented in the House of Commons of the UK Parliament since the 2024 general election by Pippa Heylings of the Liberal Democrats.

The constituency boundaries were significantly changed under the most recent Boundary Commission review. The new constituency is also named South Cambridgeshire although it comprises approximately 60% of the original electorate who are now joined by voters formerly in South East Cambridgeshire constituency along with voters in the Cherry Hinton ward formerly in Cambridge constituency.

The previous MP Anthony Browne opted to fight, unsuccessfully, the newly formed St Neots and Mid Cambridgeshire seat which contains part of his old constituency.

== Constituency profile ==
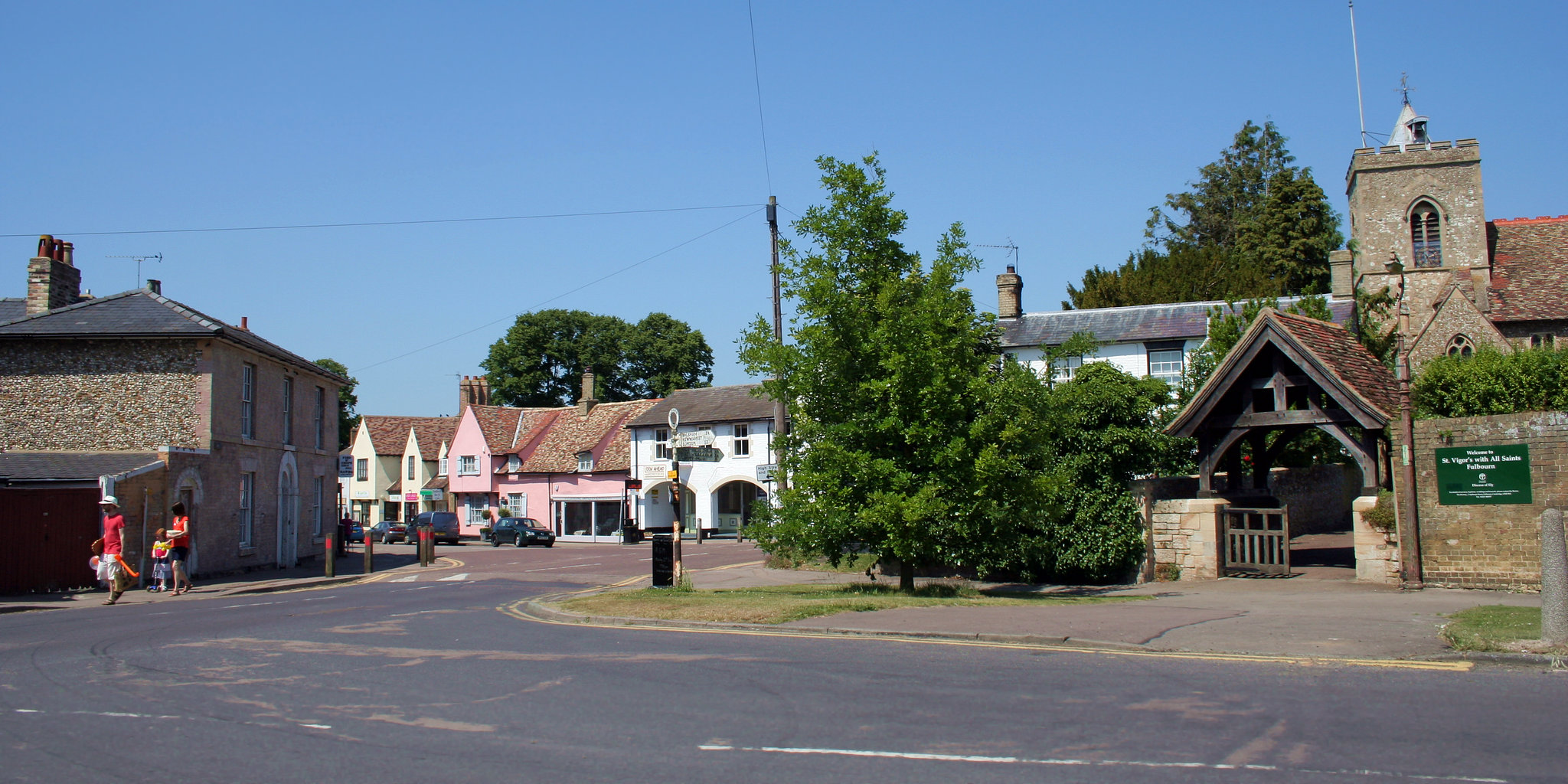
High Street, Fulbourn

South Cambridgeshire is a constituency in Cambridgeshire in the East of England, covering part of the district of the same name and some south-eastern suburbs of the city of Cambridge including Cherry Hinton. Its largest settlement outside of Cambridge is the village of Sawston, which has a population of around 8,000. Other villages in the constituency include Gamlingay, Melbourn, Great Shelford, Fulbourn and Linton.

This is a large, rural constituency with many small villages, hamlets and farms. The Cambridge suburbs are highly-affluent and contain Cambridge Biomedical Campus, the largest centre for medical research and health science in Europe and a significant local employer. The rural villages are also wealthy; most are historic settlements that have undergone recent housing development for commuters to Cambridge. House prices across the constituency are considerably higher than the regional and UK averages.

South Cambridgeshire has an above-average retired population and a below-average proportion of young adults. Residents have high levels of income and homeownership and the child poverty rate is less than half the overall UK figure. Residents are generally well-educated and a high proportion work in the health and science sectors. The percentage claiming unemployment benefits is around half the UK-wide rate. White people made up 86% of the population at the 2021 census. Asians, mostly of Indian or Chinese origin, were 8% of residents but made up around a fifth of the population in the Cambridge suburbs.

At the local council level, almost all seats in this constituency are represented by Liberal Democrats with a small number of Conservative councillors elected in the rural villages. Voters in South Cambridgeshire strongly supported remaining in the European Union in the 2016 referendum; an estimated 60% voted to remain compared to the UK-wide figure of 48%.

== Boundaries and boundary changes ==
The boundaries of South Cambridgeshire 1997–2010

=== Historic ===
Map of boundaries 2010–2024

==== 1997–2010 ====
- The District of South Cambridgeshire wards of Arrington, Bar Hill, Barrington and Shepreth, Barton, Bassingbourn, Bourn, Comberton, Coton, Duxford, Elsworth, Foxton, Gamlingay, Girton, Great Shelford, Hardwick, Harston, Haslingfield, Ickleton, Little Shelford, Longstanton, Melbourn, Meldreth, Orwell, Papworth, Sawston, Stapleford, Swavesey, The Mordens, and Whittlesford; and
- The City of Cambridge wards of Queen Edith's and Trumpington.

The constituency was created following the boundary review of 1995, and was first contested at the 1997 general election. Before this, much of the region had been part of the now abolished South West Cambridgeshire constituency represented by Sir Anthony Grant from 1983 to 1997, while the wards of Bar Hill, Coton, Elsworth, Girton, Longstanton and Swavesey were transferred from South East Cambridgeshire.

==== 2010–2024 ====
- The District of South Cambridgeshire wards of Bar Hill, Barton, Bassingbourn, Bourn, Caldecote, Comberton, Cottenham, Duxford, Fowlmere and Foxton, Gamlingay, Girton, Grantchester, Hardwick, Harston and Hauxton, Haslingfield and The Eversdens, Longstanton, Melbourn, Meldreth, Orwell and Barrington, Papworth and Elsworth, Sawston, Swavesey, The Abingtons, The Mordens, The Shelfords and Stapleford, and Whittlesford; and
- The City of Cambridge ward of Queen Edith's.

Following the 2007 review of parliamentary representation in Cambridgeshire, the Boundary Commission made minor alterations to the existing constituencies to deal with population changes.

Trumpington ward and parts of Coleridge and Cherry Hinton wards in the City of Cambridge were transferred to Cambridge, having previously been part of South Cambridgeshire.

Additionally, parts of Cottenham ward (specifically the civil parishes of Cottenham and Rampton) and the Abingtons (Babraham, Great Abington, Little Abington and Pampisford) were added to South Cambridgeshire, having previously voted in the South East Cambridgeshire constituency.

=== Current ===
Further to the 2023 review of Westminster constituencies, which came into effect for the 2024 general election, the composition of the constituency is as follows (as they existed on 1 December 2020):

- The City of Cambridge wards of: Cherry Hinton; Queen Edith’s.
- The District of South Cambridgeshire wards of: Balsham; Barrington; Bassingbourn; Duxford; Fen Ditton & Fulbourn; Foxton; Gamlingay; Hardwick; Harston & Comberton; Linton; Melbourn; Sawston; Shelford; The Mordens; Whittlesford.

The seat was subject to major changes, with northern areas, including the new towns of Cambourne and Northstowe, being transferred to the newly created constituency of St Neots and Mid Cambridgeshire. To partly compensate, it gained the Cherry Hinton ward in the City of Cambridge and southern parts of the abolished constituency of South East Cambridgeshire, including the villages of Fulbourn and Linton.

== Members of Parliament ==
South West Cambridgeshire prior to 1997

Election	Member	Party
1997	Andrew Lansley	Conservative
2015	Heidi Allen	Conservative
2019	Heidi Allen	Change UK
2019	Heidi Allen	Independent
2019	Heidi Allen	The Independents
2019	Heidi Allen	Liberal Democrats
2019	Anthony Browne	Conservative
2024	Pippa Heylings	Liberal Democrats

== Elections ==
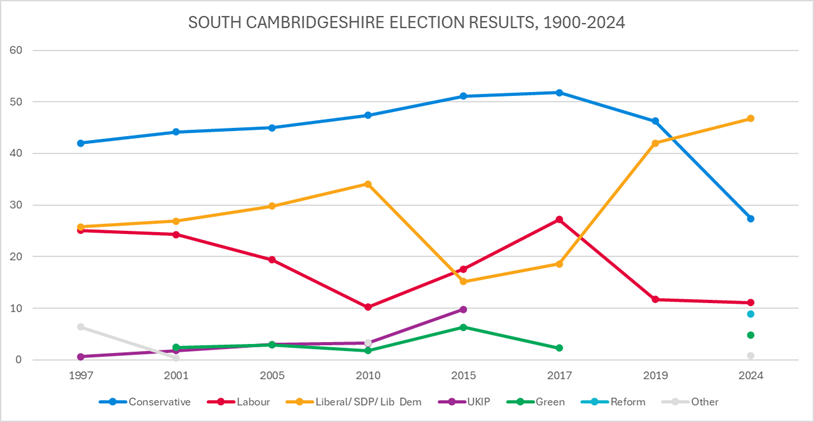
Election results 1997–2024

=== Elections in the 2020s ===
General election 2024: South Cambridgeshire
Party	Candidate	Votes	%	±%
Liberal Democrats	Pippa Heylings	25,704	46.8	+5.8
Conservative	Chris Carter-Chapman	15,063	27.4	−16.1
Labour	Luke Viner	6,106	11.1	−4.0
Reform	Harrison Edwards	4,897	8.9	+8.8
Green	Miranda Fyfe	2,656	4.8	+4.6
Independent	James Gordon	459	0.8	N/A
Majority		10,641	19.4	
Turnout		54,885	71.0	−8.6
Registered electors		77,327		
Liberal Democrats gain from Conservative		Swing	+11.0	

=== Elections in the 2010s ===
2019 notional result
Party	Vote	%
Conservative	26,153	43.5
Liberal Democrats	24,655	41.0
Labour	9,091	15.1
Green	96	0.2
Brexit Party	83	0.1
Turnout	60,078	79.6
Electorate	75,484	

General election 2019: South Cambridgeshire
Party	Candidate	Votes	%	±%
Conservative	Anthony Browne	31,015	46.3	−5.5
Liberal Democrats	Ian Sollom	28,111	42.0	+23.4
Labour	Dan Greef	7,803	11.7	−15.5
Majority		2,904	4.3	−20.3
Turnout		66,929	76.7	+0.5
Conservative hold		Swing	−14.4	

General election 2017: South Cambridgeshire
Party	Candidate	Votes	%	±%
Conservative	Heidi Allen	33,631	51.8	+0.7
Labour	Dan Greef	17,679	27.2	+9.6
Liberal Democrats	Susan van de Ven	12,102	18.6	+3.4
Green	Simon Saggers	1,512	2.3	−4.0
Majority		15,952	24.6	−8.9
Turnout		64,924	76.2	+3.1
Conservative hold		Swing	−4.5	

General election 2015: South Cambridgeshire
Party	Candidate	Votes	%	±%
Conservative	Heidi Allen	31,454	51.1	+3.7
Labour	Dan Greef	10,860	17.6	+7.4
Liberal Democrats	Sebastian Kindersley	9,368	15.2	−18.9
UKIP	Marion Mason	6,010	9.8	+6.6
Green	Simon Saggers	3,848	6.3	+4.5
Majority		20,594	33.5	+20.2
Turnout		61,540	73.1	−1.7
Conservative hold		Swing	−1.9	

General election 2010: South Cambridgeshire
Party	Candidate	Votes	%	±%
Conservative	Andrew Lansley	27,995	47.4	+0.9
Liberal Democrats	Sebastian Kindersley	20,157	34.1	+5.8
Labour	Tariq Sadiq	6,024	10.2	−9.5
Independent	Robin Page	1,968	3.3	New
UKIP	Helene Davies-Green	1,873	3.2	+0.4
Green	Simon Saggers	1,039	1.8	−1.0
Majority		7,838	13.3	+4.9
Turnout		59,056	74.8	+6.6
Conservative hold		Swing	−2.5	

=== Elections in the 2000s ===
General election 2005: South Cambridgeshire
Party	Candidate	Votes	%	±%
Conservative	Andrew Lansley	23,676	45.0	+0.8
Liberal Democrats	Andrew Dickson	15,675	29.8	+2.9
Labour	Sandra Wilson	10,189	19.4	−4.9
UKIP	Robin Page	1,556	3.0	+1.2
Green	Simon Saggers	1,552	2.9	+0.5
Majority		8,001	15.2	−2.1
Turnout		52,648	68.4	+1.3
Conservative hold		Swing	−1.1	

General election 2001: South Cambridgeshire
Party	Candidate	Votes	%	±%
Conservative	Andrew Lansley	21,387	44.2	+2.2
Liberal Democrats	Amanda Taylor	12,984	26.9	+1.1
Labour	Joan Herbert	11,737	24.3	−0.8
Green	Simon Saggers	1,182	2.4	New
UKIP	Helene Davies	875	1.8	+1.2
ProLife Alliance	Beata Klepacka	176	0.4	New
Majority		8,403	17.3	+1.1
Turnout		48,341	67.1	−9.8
Conservative hold		Swing	+0.6	

=== Elections in the 1990s ===
General election 1997: South Cambridgeshire
Party	Candidate	Votes	%	±%
Conservative	Andrew Lansley	22,572	42.0	
Liberal Democrats	James A. Quinlan	13,860	25.8	
Labour	Tony Gray	13,485	25.1	
Referendum	Robin Page	3,300	6.1	
UKIP	Derek A. Norman	298	0.6	
Natural Law	Francis C. Chalmers	168	0.3	
Majority		8,712	16.2	
Turnout		53,683	76.9	
Conservative win (new seat)				

== See also ==
- List of parliamentary constituencies in Cambridgeshire
- List of parliamentary constituencies in the East of England (region)
- South Cambridgeshire (administrative district)
