= Ely and East Cambridgeshire =

UK Parliament constituency (since 2024)

- County constituency for the House of Commons
- Interactive map of boundaries since 2024
- Location within the East of England
- County: Cambridgeshire
- Electorate: 76,279 (March 2020)
- Major settlements: Ely, Littleport, Soham, Waterbeach

Current constituency
- Created: 2024
- Member of Parliament: Charlotte Cane (Liberal Democrats)
- Seats: One
- Created from: South East Cambridgeshire (most), South Cambridgeshire (part), North East Cambridgeshire (part)

Ely and East Cambridgeshire is a constituency of the House of Commons in the UK Parliament. It was first contested at the 2024 general election, since when it has been represented by Charlotte Cane of the Liberal Democrats.

== Constituency profile ==
Ely and East Cambridgeshire is a rural constituency located in Cambridgeshire. Its largest settlement is the small cathedral city of Ely, which has a population of around 19,000. Other settlements include the towns of Soham and Littleport and the villages of Sutton-in-the-Isle, Cottenham, Milton and Burwell. Ely is the seat of a diocese and was historically an island in the Fens, an area of marshland which was drained in the 18th and 19th centuries. Deprivation in the constituency is low and the area is generally affluent. House prices are higher than the national average.

In general, residents are older, well-educated and more likely to work in professional occupations compared to the rest of the country. Household income is high. White people made up 94% of the population at the 2021 census. At the local council level, most of the constituency is represented by Liberal Democrats, although Conservatives were elected in Soham and Littleport. An estimated 51% of voters in the constituency supported remaining in the European Union in the 2016 referendum compared to 48% nationwide.

== Boundaries ==
The constituency was created by the 2023 review of Westminster constituencies and was first contested at the 2024 general election. It is composed of the following:

- The District of East Cambridgeshire
- The District of South Cambridgeshire wards of Cottenham, and Milton & Waterbeach.

The bulk of the electorate, including the city of Ely and the town of Soham, was derived from about two-thirds of the abolished constituency of South East Cambridgeshire, with the addition of areas from North East Cambridgeshire (Littleport, Sutton-in-the-Isle and Downham Villages) and South Cambridgeshire (Cottenham).

== Members of Parliament ==
Election	Member	Party
2024	Charlotte Cane	Liberal Democrats

== Elections ==
=== Elections in the 2020s ===
General election 2024: Ely and East Cambridgeshire
Party	Candidate	Votes	%	±%
Liberal Democrats	Charlotte Cane	17,127	32.7	+3.4
Conservative	Lucy Frazer	16,632	31.8	−22.2
Labour	Elizabeth McWilliams	9,160	17.5	+3.1
Reform	Ryan Coogan	6,443	12.3	N/A
Green	Andy Cogan	2,359	4.5	+3.9
Monster Raving Loony	Hoo-Ray Henry	271	0.5	N/A
SDP	Robert Bayley	172	0.3	N/A
Independent	Obi Monye	103	0.2	N/A
Independent	Rob Rawlins	102	0.2	N/A
Majority		495	0.9	N/A
Turnout		52,369	66.4	−5.0
Registered electors		79,112		
Liberal Democrats gain from Conservative		Swing	+12.8	

=== Elections in the 2010s ===
2019 notional result
Party	Vote	%
Conservative	29,385	54.0
Liberal Democrats	15,936	29.3
Labour	7,825	14.4
Others	1,009	1.9
Green	310	0.6
Turnout	54,465	71.4
Electorate	76,279	

== See also ==
- List of parliamentary constituencies in Cambridgeshire
