= South East Cambridgeshire =

UK Parliament constituency (1983–2024)

Coordinates: 52.131°N 0.310°E

- Former county constituency for the House of Commons
- Boundary of South East Cambridgeshire in Cambridgeshire for the 2010 general election

- Location of Cambridgeshire within England
- County: Cambridgeshire
- Electorate: 84,668 (2018)
- Major settlements: Ely

1983–2024
- Seats: One
- Created from: Cambridgeshire, Isle of Ely
- Replaced by: Ely and East Cambridgeshire

South East Cambridgeshire was a constituency (Note: A county constituency (for the purposes of election expenses and type of returning officer)) represented in the House of Commons of the UK Parliament from 2015 to 2024 by Lucy Frazer, a member of the Conservative Party who served as Secretary of State for Culture, Media and Sport from 2023 to 2024. (Note: As with all constituencies, the constituency elects one Member of Parliament (MP) by the first past the post system of election at least every five years.) The constituency was established for the 1983 general election and was based on the cathedral city of Ely.

Under the 2023 periodic review of Westminster constituencies, the constituency was subject to major boundary changes. As a result, the seat was abolished for the 2024 general election, with the majority of the electorate being included in the new constituency of Ely and East Cambridgeshire.

== History ==
The constituency was created in 1983 from parts of the former seats of Cambridgeshire and Isle of Ely. Its first MP, Francis Pym, was a Conservative Cabinet Minister, serving in roles such as Secretary of State for Northern Ireland (1973–1974) in the Heath government and Secretary of State for Defence (1979–1981), Leader of the House of Commons (1981–1982) and most prominently Foreign Secretary (1982–1983, during the Falklands War) under Margaret Thatcher. However, during the four years he served South East Cambridgeshire, he was a Tory 'wet' backbencher, having been sacked by Thatcher for famously remarking during the 1983 election that "Landslides don't on the whole produce successful governments".

It has to date been a safe Conservative seat, although in 2010 the margin was cut to a relatively small 10.3% by the Liberal Democrat candidate (possibly helped by controversies surrounding the Labour candidate). In 2015 and 2017 Labour achieved the largest increase in their share of the vote; in 2017 they achieved their highest ever vote share in the seat (27.7%) and overtook the Liberal Democrats for the first time since 1997; despite this, the Conservatives achieved over 50% of the vote in the seat for the first time since 1992.

According to approximate analysis of the 2016 EU membership referendum, South East Cambridgeshire (which is made up of wards from East Cambridgeshire District Council, which voted 51% to leave, as well as South Cambridgeshire District Council, which voted 60% to remain) voted 54% to remain in the EU.

== Constituency profile ==
The constituency includes the small city of Ely and is predominantly low-lying and agricultural, with many residents commuting to work in Cambridge. Workless claimants were in November 2012 significantly lower than the national average of 3.8%, at 1.4% of the population based on a statistical compilation by The Guardian.

South East Cambridgeshire
- Interactive map of South East Cambridgeshire

Racial makeup (2021)
  - White: 91.8%
  - Asian: 3.8%
  - Mixed: 2.4%
  - Black: 1.0%
  - Other: 0.9%

Religion (2021)
  - Christian: 47.3%
  - None: 42.8%
  - Not answered: 6.6%
  - Muslim: 1.1%
  - Hindu: 0.9%
  - Other: 0.5%
  - Buddhist: 0.5%
  - Jewish: 0.2%
  - Sikh: 0.1%

== Boundaries and boundary changes ==
=== 1983–1997 ===
- The District of East Cambridgeshire wards of Bottisham, Burwell, Cheveley, Dullingham Villages, Ely North, Ely South, Ely West, Fordham Villages, Isleham, Soham, The Swaffhams, and Woodditton; and
- The District of South Cambridgeshire wards of Abington, Balsham, Bar Hill, Castle Camps, Coton, Cottenham, Elsworth, Fulbourn, Girton, Histon, Linton, Longstanton, Milton, Over, Swavesey, Teversham, The Wilbrahams, Waterbeach, and Willingham.

The seat was created for the 1983 general election which followed on from the merger under the Local Government Act 1972, of the two administrative counties of Huntingdon and Peterborough and Cambridgeshire and Isle of Ely to form the non-metropolitan county of Cambridgeshire, with effect from 1 April 1974. It was formed from eastern parts of the abolished constituency of Cambridgeshire, together with the city of Ely, which had been in the abolished constituency of Isle of Ely.

=== 1997–2010 ===
- The District of East Cambridgeshire wards of Bottisham, Burwell, Cheveley, Dullingham Villages, Ely North, Ely South, Ely West, Fordham Villages, Haddenham, Isleham, Soham, Stretham, The Swaffhams, Witchford, and Woodditton; and
- The District of South Cambridgeshire wards of Abington, Balsham, Castle Camps, Cottenham, Fulbourn, Histon, Linton, Milton, Over, Teversham, The Wilbrahams, Waterbeach, and Willingham.

The westernmost area was transferred to the new constituency of South Cambridgeshire. Minor gain from North East Cambridgeshire.

Map of boundaries 2010–2024

=== 2010–2024 ===
- The District of East Cambridgeshire wards of Bottisham, Burwell, Cheveley, Dullingham Villages, Ely East, Ely North, Ely South, Ely West, Fordham Villages, Haddenham, Isleham, Soham North, Soham South, Stretham, and The Swaffhams; and
- The District of South Cambridgeshire wards of Balsham, Fulbourn, Histon and Impington, Linton, Milton, Teversham, The Wilbrahams, Waterbeach, and Willingham and Over.

Further minor loss to South Cambridgeshire.

The constituency included the eastern half of South Cambridgeshire district and the southern part of East Cambridgeshire. Ely, the largest community, has cathedral city status, and there are many smaller settlements including Burwell, Fulbourn, Isleham, Linton, Milton, Soham and Waterbeach.

== Members of Parliament ==
Election	Member	Party
1983	Francis Pym	Conservative
1987	Sir Jim Paice	Conservative
2015	Lucy Frazer	Conservative

== Elections ==
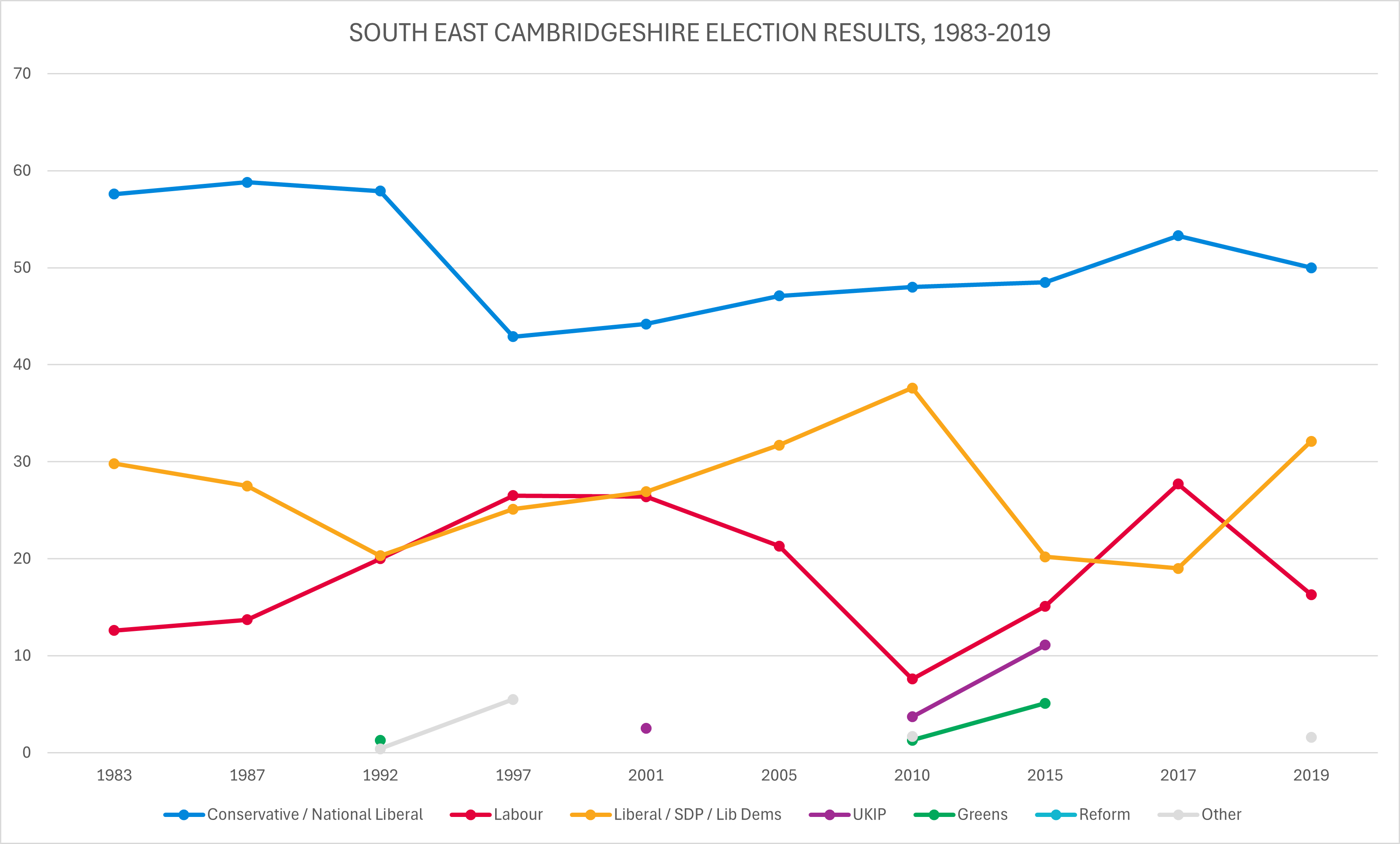
Election results 1983-2019

=== Elections in the 2010s ===
General election 2019: South East Cambridgeshire
Party	Candidate	Votes	%	±%
Conservative	Lucy Frazer	32,187	50.0	−3.3
Liberal Democrats	Pippa Heylings	20,697	32.1	+13.1
Labour	James Bull	10,492	16.3	−11.4
Independent	Edmund Fordham	1,009	1.6	New
Majority		11,490	17.9	−7.7
Turnout		64,385	74.2	+1.0
Conservative hold		Swing	−8.3	

Edmund Fordham was originally the Brexit Party candidate for the Bury St Edmunds constituency in the 2019 general election.

General election 2017: South East Cambridgeshire
Party	Candidate	Votes	%	±%
Conservative	Lucy Frazer	33,601	53.3	+4.8
Labour	Huw Jones	17,443	27.7	+12.6
Liberal Democrats	Lucy Nethsingha	11,958	19.0	−1.2
Majority		16,158	25.6	−2.7
Turnout		63,002	73.2	+2.8
Conservative hold		Swing	−3.8	

General election 2015: South East Cambridgeshire
Party	Candidate	Votes	%	±%
Conservative	Lucy Frazer (Note: Note: In January 2014 Lucy Frazer, a barrister, was "reaffirmed" as Conservative candidate for South East Cambridgeshire on Friday despite claims that she had been beaten in an open primary by another woman, Heidi Allen, who is the Conservative candidate in the neighbouring constituency, South Cambridgeshire.)	28,845	48.5	+0.5
Liberal Democrats	Jonathan Chatfield	12,008	20.2	−17.6
Labour	Huw Jones	9,013	15.1	+7.5
UKIP	Deborah Rennie	6,593	11.1	+7.4
Green	Clive Semmens	3,047	5.1	+3.8
Majority		16,837	28.3	+17.9
Turnout		59,506	70.4	+1.1
Conservative hold		Swing	+9.0	

General election 2010: South East Cambridgeshire
Party	Candidate	Votes	%	±%
Conservative	James Paice	27,629	48.0	+0.8
Liberal Democrats	Jonathan Chatfield	21,683	37.6	+6.2
Labour	John Cowan	4,380	7.6	−13.8
UKIP	Andy Monk	2,138	3.7	New
Green	Simon Sedgwick-Jell	766	1.3	New
Independent	Geoffrey Woollard	517	0.9	New
CPA	Daniel Bell	489	0.8	New
Majority		5,946	10.4	−5.0
Turnout		57,602	69.3	+4.0
Conservative hold		Swing	−2.7	

Percentage changes based on 2005 notional results due to boundary changes.

=== Elections in the 2000s ===
General election 2005: South East Cambridgeshire
Party	Candidate	Votes	%	±%
Conservative	James Paice	26,374	47.1	+2.9
Liberal Democrats	Jonathan Chatfield	17,750	31.7	+4.8
Labour	Fiona Ross	11,936	21.3	−5.1
Majority		8,624	15.4	−1.9
Turnout		56,060	65.3	+1.8
Conservative hold		Swing	−1.0	

General election 2001: South East Cambridgeshire
Party	Candidate	Votes	%	±%
Conservative	James Paice	22,927	44.2	+1.3
Liberal Democrats	Sal Brinton	13,937	26.9	+1.8
Labour	Andrew Inchley	13,714	26.4	−0.1
UKIP	Neil Scarr	1,308	2.5	New
Majority		8,990	17.3	0.0
Turnout		51,886	63.5	−10.6
Conservative hold		Swing	−0.3	

=== Elections in the 1990s ===
General election 1997: South East Cambridgeshire
Party	Candidate	Votes	%	±%
Conservative	James Paice	24,397	42.9	−15.0
Labour	Rex Collinson	15,048	26.5	+6.5
Liberal Democrats	Sal Brinton	14,246	25.1	+4.8
Referendum	John Howlett	2,838	5.0	New
Building a Fair Society	Karl Lam	167	0.3	New
Natural Law	Peter While	111	0.2	−0.2
Majority		9,349	17.3	−20.2
Turnout		56,807	75.1	−5.5
Conservative hold		Swing	−10.8	

General election 1992: South East Cambridgeshire
Party	Candidate	Votes	%	±%
Conservative	James Paice	36,693	57.9	−0.9
Liberal Democrats	Ronald Wotherspoon	12,883	20.3	−7.2
Labour	Arthur Jones	12,688	20.0	+6.3
Green	John Marsh	836	1.3	New
Natural Law	Bridget Langridge	231	0.4	New
Majority		23,810	37.5	+6.2
Turnout		63,331	80.6	+3.2
Conservative hold		Swing	+3.2	

=== Elections in the 1980s ===
General election 1987: South East Cambridgeshire
Party	Candidate	Votes	%	±%
Conservative	James Paice	32,901	58.8	+1.2
SDP	Peter Lee	15,399	27.5	−2.3
Labour	Thomas Ling	7,694	13.7	+1.1
Majority		17,502	31.3	+3.5
Turnout		55,994	77.4	+3.2
Conservative hold		Swing	+1.8	

General election 1983: South East Cambridgeshire
Party	Candidate	Votes	%	±%
Conservative	Francis Pym	28,555	57.6	
SDP	Christopher Slee	14,791	29.8	
Labour	Mary Jackson	6,261	12.6	
Majority		13,764	27.8	
Turnout		49,607	74.2	
Conservative win (new seat)				

== See also ==
- List of parliamentary constituencies in Cambridgeshire
