= Paym =

Former British mobile payment system

- Founded: April 2014
- Founder: Payments Council
- Defunct: March 2023
- Area served: United Kingdom
- Services: Mobile payments
- Parent: Mobile Payments Service Company Limited
- Website: paym.co.uk

Paym (/ˈpeɪ.əm/ PAY-əm) was a mobile payment system provided by banks and building societies in the United Kingdom. Recipients were identified by their mobile phone number instead of bank details such as sort code and account number.

The service was developed by the Payments Council and participating banks and building societies, with Bank of Scotland, Barclays, Cumberland Building Society, Danske Bank, Halifax, HSBC, Lloyds Bank, Santander and TSB involved from the launch in April 2014. More than nine out of ten current accounts in the UK supported Paym after Clydesdale Bank, First Direct, Isle of Man Bank, NatWest, RBS International, The Royal Bank of Scotland, and Yorkshire Bank joined later in 2014. Nationwide Building Society joined Paym in June 2015, with Metro Bank and Tesco Bank planning to join later in 2015. The underlying network technology is provided by VocaLink. The name "Paym" was stylised in the logo with a slight gap between "Pay" and "m", and is a play on words over "Pay 'em", a contraction of "Pay them", and "Pay M" alluding to "Pay Mobile". In 2018 Paym had around 4 million users.

The recipient had to register in order to link their mobile phone number with their bank account. Those wishing to make a payment to a registered phone number could use their existing mobile banking or online banking service. Payments made through Paym took place at the same speeds as existing Faster Payments or LINK payment mechanisms.

The sender would enter the recipient's phone number (or selects their number in their own phone's address book). The sender's bank would then retrieve the account number and sort code associated with that phone number, and then send the money using the Faster Payments Service. The sender was shown the recipient's name (in order to confirm that they were paying the right person) but not their account details.

The Paym service closed down on 7 March 2023.

== See also ==
- Barclays Pingit
- Swish (payment) A similar system in use in Sweden
- PayID A similar system in use in Australia
- MB Way A similar system in use in Portugal
