= Payment and settlement systems in India =

Payment and settlement systems are used for financial transactions in India. Covered by the Payment and Settlement Systems Act of 2007 (PSS Act), legislated in December 2007, they are regulated by the Reserve Bank of India (RBI) and the Board for Regulation and Supervision of Payment and Settlement Systems.

India has multiple payments and settlement systems, both gross and net settlement systems. For gross settlement India has a real-time gross settlement (RTGS) system called by the same name. Its net settlement systems include the Electronic Clearing Services (ECS Credit), Electronic Clearing Services (ECS Debit), credit cards, debit cards, the National Electronic Fund Transfer (NEFT) system, Immediate Payment Service, and Unified Payments Interface (UPI).

According to a survey by Celent, the use of e-payments instead of paper-based transactions increased considerably between 2004 and 2008 due to technological developments and increasing consumer awareness and comfort with internet and mobile transactions.

The RBI is encouraging alternative methods of payments to make the financial payment and settlement process in India more secure and efficient. It has made RTGS compulsory for high-value transactions. It introduced NEFT and NECS (National Electronic Clearing Services) to encourage individuals and businesses to switch from paper to electronic transactions.

Growing availability of Internet connected services and the issuance of 1.3 billion biometric ID numbers in the region has made it easier for Indian customers to open bank accounts and use electronic payment systems. As of 2023 there are 907.4 million internet users in India (64% of the population), a 35% increase since 2018. 63% payments still being made in cash. E-payments have been heavily promoted in India showing consumers the various ways they can make these payments Including ATMs, the Internet, mobile phones and drop boxes.

Due to RBI efforts and the Board for Regulation and Supervision of Payment and Settlement Systems (BPSS), now over 75% of all transaction volume is electronic, including both large-value and retail payments. Out of this 75%, 98% come from the RTGS (large-value payments) whereas a meager 2% come from retail payments. This means consumers have not yet accepted this as a regular means of paying their bills and still prefer conventional methods. Retail payments if made via electronic modes are done by ECS (debit and credit), EFT and card payments. The Reserve Bank on Monday asked banks to put in place additional arrangements for export and import transactions in Indian rupees in view of increasing interest of the global trading community in the domestic currency. Before putting in place this mechanism, banks will require prior approval from the Foreign Exchange Department of the Reserve Bank of India (RBI), the central bank said in a circular.

== Real-time gross settlement ==
The acronym 'RTGS' stands for Real-time gross settlement. The Reserve Bank of India (India's Central Bank) maintains this payment network. Real-time gross settlement is a funds transfer mechanism where transfer of money takes place from one bank to another on a 'real time' and on 'gross' basis. This is the fastest possible money transfer system through the banking channel. Settlement in 'real time' means payment transaction is not subjected to any waiting period. The transactions are settled as soon as they are processed. 'Gross settlement' means the transaction is settled on one to one basis without bunching with any other transaction. Considering that money transfer takes place in the books of the Reserve Bank of India, the payment is regarded as final and irrevocable.

Fees for RTGS vary from bank to bank. RBI has prescribed upper limit for the fees that can be charged by all banks both for NEFT and RTGS. Both the remitting and receiving parties must have core banking in place to engage into RTGS transactions. Core Banking enabled banks and branches are assigned an Indian Financial System Code (IFSC) for RTGS and NEFT purposes. This is an eleven digit alphanumeric code and unique to each bank branch. The first four letters indicate the identity of the bank and remaining seven numerals indicate a single branch. This code is provided on the cheque books, which is required for transactions along with recipient's account number.

RTGS is a large value funds transfer system (with a minimum transaction value of ₹200,000 (US$2,300)) where financial intermediaries can settle interbank transfers for their own account as well as for their customers. The system achieves final settlement of interbank funds transfers on a continuous, transaction-by-transaction basis throughout the processing day. Customers can access the RTGS facility between 09:00 to 16:30 (Interbank transactions up to 18:30) on weekdays and 09:00 to 14:00 (Interbank transactions up to 15:00) on Saturdays. However, the timings may vary depending on the bank branch. Time-varying charges were introduced by the RBI effective from 1 October 2011. The primary purpose of RTGS is to facilitate transactions that require immediate completion.

Banks could use balances maintained under the cash reserve ratio (CRR) and the intra-day liquidity (IDL) to be supplied by the central bank, for meeting any eventuality arising out of the real time gross settlement (RTGS). The RBI fixed the IDL limit for banks to three times their net owned fund (NOF).

The IDL will be charged at ₹25 per transaction entered into by the bank on the RTGS platform. The marketable securities and treasury bills will have to be placed as collateral with a margin of five per cent. However, the apex bank will also impose severe penalties if the IDL is not paid back at the end of the day.

Since 26 August 2019, the RTGS service window for customers' transactions is available from 07:00 to 18:00 from Monday to Saturday (except the second and fourth Saturday of each month). No transactions are settled on Sundays and bank holidays. The service is scheduled to become available 24 hours a day starting in December 2020.

The RBI announced on 11 June 2019 that 'all charges for payments via RTGS and National Electronic Funds Transfer (NEFT) collected from banks would be waived from 1 July 2019, and asked banks to pass on the benefits to customers.'

=== RTGS Timings ===
RTGS Timings
Open for Business	07:00
Initial Cut-off (Customer Transaction)	18:00
Final Cut-off (Inter Bank Transaction)	19:45
Intra-day liquidity (IDL) Reversal	19:45 to 20:00
End of the Day	20:00

=== Service Charge for RTGS ===
Inward transactions: No charge to be levied.

Outward transactions:

- For transactions of ₹200,000 (US$2,300) to ₹500,000 (US$5,700): up to ₹25 (29¢ US) per transaction plus applicable time varying charges (₹1 (1.1¢ US) to ₹5 (5.7¢ US)); total not exceeding ₹30 (34¢ US) per transaction, (+ GST).
- Above ₹500,000 (US$5,700): ₹5 (5.7¢ US) per transaction plus applicable time varying charges (₹1 to ₹5); total charges not exceeding ₹55 per transaction, (+ GST).

No time varying charges are applicable for RTGS transactions settled up to 1300 hrs.

==== On 6 June 2019 ====
To push digital transactions RBI has removed charges for payments via NEFT and RTGS and asked banks to pass on the benefits to customers. This means that payments via NEFT and RTGS would become either free or charges would be drastically reduced.

24x7 Availability of Real Time Gross Settlement (RTGS) System

In a major development, Reserve Bank of India (RBI) Governor Shaktikanta Das has confirmed that RTGS facility is now operational 24×7.

== National Electronic Funds Transfer (NEFT) ==
Started in November 2005, the National Electronic Fund Transfer (NEFT) system is a nationwide system that facilitates individuals, firms and corporates to electronically transfer funds from any bank branch to any individual, firm or corporate having an account with any other bank branch in the country. It is done via electronic messages. Even though it is not on real time basis like RTGS (Real Time Gross Settlement), half hourly batches are run in order to speed up the transactions.

For being part of the NEFT funds transfer network, a bank branch has to be NEFT-enabled. NEFT has gained popularity due to it saving on time and the ease with which the transactions can be concluded. As at 31 January 2011, 74,680 branches or offices of 101 banks in the country (out of around 82,400 bank branches) were NEFT-enabled. Steps are being taken to further widen the coverage both in terms of banks and branches offices. As on 30 December 2017 total number of NEFT enabled branches was increased to 139682 of 188 banks.

== Indo-Nepal Remittance Facility Scheme ==
Indo-Nepal Remittance Facility is a cross-border remittance scheme to transfer funds from India to Nepal, enabled under the NEFT Scheme. The scheme was launched to provide a safe and cost-efficient avenue to migrant Nepalese workers in India to remit money back to their families in Nepal. A remitter can transfer funds up to ₹50,000 (maximum permissible amount) from any of the NEFT-enabled branches in India. The beneficiary would receive funds in Nepalese Rupees.

== Immediate Payment Service (IMPS) ==
Immediate Payment Service (IMPS) is an initiative of National Payments Corporation of India (NPCI). It is a service through which money can be transferred immediately from one account to the other account, within the same bank or accounts across other banks. Upon registration, both the individuals are issued an MMID (Mobile Money Identifier) Code from their respective banks. This is a 7-digit numeric code. To initiate the transaction, the sender in his mobile banking application need to enter the registered mobile number of the receiver, MMID of the receiver and amount to be transferred. Upon successful transaction, the money gets credited in the account of the receiver instantly. This facility is available 24/7 and can be used through mobile banking application. Some banks have also started providing this service through internet banking profile of their customers. Though most banks offer this facility free of cost to encourage paperless payment system, ICICI bank and Axis bank charge for it as per their respective NEFT charges.

Money through this service can be transferred directly also by using the receiver's bank account number and IFS code. In such case, neither the receiver of the money need to be registered for mobile banking service of his bank, nor does he need MMID code. IMPS facility differs from NEFT and RTGS as there is no time limit to carry out the transaction. This facility can be availed 24/7 and on all public and bank holidays including RBI holidays.

== Unified Payments Interface ==
Unified Payments Interface (UPI) is an instant real-time payment system developed by National Payments Corporation of India facilitating inter-bank transactions. The interface is regulated by the Reserve Bank of India and works by instantly transferring funds between two bank accounts on a mobile platform. The Unified Payment Interface (UPI) can be thought of like an email ID for your money. It will be a unique identifier that your bank uses to transfer money and make payments using the IMPS (Immediate Payments Service). IMPS is faster than NEFT and lets you transfer money immediately and unlike NEFT, it works 24/7. This means that the online payments will become much easier without requiring a digital wallet or credit or debit card.

== Bharat Bill Payment System ==
Bharat Bill Payment System (BBPS) is an integrated bill payment system in India offering interoperable and accessible bill payment service to customers through a network of agents, enabling multiple payment modes, and providing instant confirmation of payment. This is still in the implementation stage. Guidelines for implementation of this system were issued on 28 November 2014.

== Comparison ==
The key difference between RTGS and NEFT is that while RTGS is on gross settlement basis, NEFT is on net settlement basis. Besides, RTGS facilitates real-time ("push") transfer, while NEFT involves regular settlements and is operating 24/7/365 since December 2019. Customers can access the RTGS facility between 09:00 to 16:30 on weekdays and 09:00 to 13:30 on Saturday. RTGS is available 24/7/365 from 00:30 on 14 December 2020. Round the clock availability of RTGS will provide extended flexibility to businesses for effecting payments.

RTGS facility is available in over 113,000 branches across India, while NEFT is available in little over 115,000 branches of a 100 banks.
