= ToDDaSO =

UK electronic payment service

ToDDaSO was an electronic payments service in the UK for the transfer of retail customer payment arrangements between different bank accounts in UK banks. ToDDaSO is an acronym that stands for Transfer of Direct Debits and Standing Orders.

The service allowed UK retail banks to electronically request the transfer of direct debit and standing order payments arrangements, on behalf of new customers, wishing to transfer payment arrangements from a previous bank account. The scheme was also known as the Inter Bank Transfer of Direct Debit Instructions service and is governed by BACS, the UK's automated payments clearing scheme.

ToDDaSO is also commonly referred to in the UK as the Switching Bank Account Service.

As of the end of 2014 the ToDDaSO system has been made defunct with the new Current Account Switch Service (CASS) and the Partial Account Switching Service taking over its role in account switching.

== Background ==
This service was first established in the mid 1990s, and then improved in 2005 as an industry response to criticisms of consumer banking services, contained in Section 4 of Don Cruickshank's Review of Banking Services in the UK , published by the HM Treasury. This government report highlighted the competitive difficulties faced by retail customers in being able to switch between retail account providers.
