= Direct Corporate Access =

Direct corporate access payment (DCA Payment) is part of the United Kingdom Faster Payments Service (FPS) banking systems and allows Banks' business customers to have direct access to the clearing systems for sending multiple payment instructions electronically. Business customers of a UK Bank can send instructions in a very similar way to the way the older Bacstel-IP provided access to BACS.

Direct corporate access payments only enables submission of files of payments, these are then split by the operator into individual payment instructions for processing through the FPS.

== History ==
DCA payment was developed by APACS on behalf of the FPS member banks and the infrastructure went live in March 2009. Barclays was the first bank live for customer sponsorship in August 2009.

Albany Software was the first solution supplier to successfully process a payment through the Faster Payments Service via DCA, using Albany ePAY on Wednesday 22 July 2009.

== Service ==
=== Availability ===
DCA Payments are available for file submission 7 days a week 24 hours a day and are only for Pound sterling transactions. As of 2020, maximum individual payment value is £1,000,000. Payments are submitted in files via the Secure-IP channel. Beneficiaries must use FPS addressable sort codes.

=== Timescales ===
DCA payments are processed by the sponsoring bank according to their Service Level Agreements. Beneficiary banks which are members of FPS must apply the funds to the beneficiary account within two hours, although in most cases it is done immediately.

=== Bureaux and third parties ===
Bureau organisations can submit files of payments on behalf of other registered service users of direct corporate access. The bureau needs to be sponsored by a DCA-enabled bank and to use a Bacs Approved Software Service (BASS) software. File submissions can only be made on behalf service of users of a DCA-enabled bank.
