= Mobile banking =

Service provided by a bank

Mobile banking, also known as app-based banking is a service that allows a bank's customers to conduct financial transactions using a mobile device. Unlike the related internet banking it uses software, usually an app, provided by the bank. Mobile banking is usually available on a 24-hour basis. Many neobanks operate exclusively through mobile banking.

Transactions through mobile banking depend on the features of the mobile banking app provided and typically includes obtaining account balances and lists of latest transactions, electronic bill payments, remote check deposits, P2P payments, and funds transfers between a customer's or another's accounts. Some apps also enable copies of statements to be downloaded and sometimes printed at the customer's premises. Using a mobile banking app increases ease of use, speed, flexibility and also improves security because it integrates with the user built-in mobile device security mechanisms.

From the bank's point of view, mobile banking reduces the cost of handling transactions by reducing the need for customers to visit a bank branch for non-cash withdrawal and deposit transactions. Mobile banking does not handle transactions involving cash, and a customer needs to visit an ATM or bank branch for cash withdrawals or deposits. Many apps now have a remote deposit option; using the device's camera to digitally transmit cheques to their financial institution.

Mobile banking differs from mobile payments, which involves the use of a mobile device to pay for goods or services either at the point of sale or remotely, analogous to the use of a debit or credit card.

== History ==
The earliest mobile banking services used SMS, a service known as SMS banking. With the introduction of smart phones with WAP support enabling the use of the mobile web in 1999, the first European banks started to offer mobile banking on this platform to their customers.

Mobile banking before 2010 was most often performed via SMS or the mobile web. Apple's initial success with the iPhone and the rapid growth of phones based on Google's Android operating system have led to increasing use of special mobile apps, downloaded to the mobile device. With that said, advancements in web technologies such as HTML5, CSS3 and JavaScript have seen more banks launching mobile web based services to complement native applications. These applications are consisted of a web application module in JSP such as J2EE and functions of another module J2ME.

A recent study (May 2012) by Mapa Research suggests that over a third of banks have mobile device detection upon visiting the banks' main website. A number of things can happen on mobile detection such as redirecting to an app store, redirection to a mobile banking specific website or providing a menu of mobile banking options for the user to choose from.

== Concept ==
In one academic model, mobile banking is defined as:

Mobile Banking refers to provision and availment of banking- and financial services with the help of mobile telecommunication devices.The scope of offered services may include facilities to conduct bank and stock market transactions, to administer accounts and to access customised information."

According to this model mobile banking can be said to consist of three inter-related concepts:

- Mobile accounting
- Mobile financial information services

Most services in the categories designated accounting and brokerage are transaction-based. The non-transaction-based services of an informational nature are however essential for conducting transactions – for instance, balance inquiries might be needed before committing a money remittance. The accounting and brokerage services are therefore offered invariably in combination with information services. Information services, on the other hand, may be offered as an independent module.

Mobile banking may also be used to help in business situations as well as for financial situation

== Mobile banking services ==
Typical mobile banking services may include:

=== Account information ===
1. Mini-statements and checking of account history
2. Alerts on account activity or passing of set thresholds
3. Monitoring of term deposits
4. Access to loan statements
5. Access to card statements
6. Mutual funds / equity statements
7. Insurance policy management

=== Transaction ===
1. Funds transfers between the customer's linked accounts
2. Paying third parties, including bill payments and third party fund transfers(see, e.g., FAST)
3. Check Remote Deposit

=== Investments ===
1. Portfolio management services
2. Real-time stock

=== Support ===
1. Status of requests for credit, including mortgage approval, and insurance coverage
2. Check (cheque) book and card requests
3. Exchange of data messages and email, including complaint submission and tracking
4. ATM Location
5. Loan Application

=== Content services ===
1. General information such as finance related news
2. Loyalty-related offers

AA report by the US Federal Reserve (March 2012) found that 21 percent of mobile phone owners had used mobile banking in the past 12 months. By 2024, this figure had grown dramatically, with 55% of US bank customers using mobile apps as their primary banking method, according to a survey by the American Bankers Association. Based on a survey conducted by Forrester, mobile banking will be attractive mainly to the younger, more "tech-savvy" customer segment. A third of mobile phone users say that they may consider performing some kind of financial transaction through their mobile phone. But most of the users are interested in performing basic transactions such as querying for account balance and making bill.

== Challenges ==
Key challenges in developing a sophisticated mobile banking application are :

=== Handset accessibility ===
There are a large number of different mobile phone devices and it is a big challenge for banks to offer a mobile banking service on any type of device. Some of these devices support Java ME and others support SIM Application Toolkit, a WAP browser, or only SMS.

Initial interoperability issues however have been localized, with countries like India using portals like "R-World" to enable the limitations of low end java based phones, while focus on areas such as South Africa have defaulted to the USSD as a basis of communication achievable with any phone.

The desire for interoperability is largely dependent on the banks themselves, where installed applications(Java based or native) provide better security, are easier to use and allow development of more complex capabilities similar to those of internet banking while SMS can provide the basics but becomes difficult to operate with more complex transactions.

There is a myth that there is a challenge of interoperability between mobile banking applications due to perceived lack of common technology standards for mobile banking. In practice it is too early in the service lifecycle for interoperability to be addressed within an individual country, as very few countries have more than one mobile banking service provider. In practice, banking interfaces are well defined and money movements between banks follow the IS0-8583 standard. As mobile banking matures, money movements between service providers will naturally adopt the same standards as in the banking world.

In January 2009, Mobile Marketing Association (MMA) Banking Sub-Committee, chaired by CellTrust and VeriSign Inc., published the Mobile Banking Overview for financial institutions in which it discussed the advantages and disadvantages of Mobile Channel Platforms such as Short Message Services (SMS), Mobile Web, Mobile Client Applications, SMS with Mobile Web and Secure SMS.

=== Security ===
As with most internet-connected devices, as well as mobile-telephony devices, cybercrime rates are escalating year-on-year. The types of cybercrimes which may affect mobile-banking might range from unauthorized use while the owner is using the mobile banking, to remote-hacking, or even jamming or interference via the internet or telephone network data streams. This is demonstrated by the malware called SMSZombie.A, which infected Chinese Android devices. It was embedded in wallpaper apps and installed itself so it can exploit the weaknesses of China Mobile SMS Payment system, stealing banks credit card numbers and information linked to financial transactions. A malware discovered recently was the Trojan called Bankbot. It went past Google's protections in its Android app marketplace and targeted mobile banking customers on Android devices worldwide before its removal by Google in September 2017.

In the banking world, currency rates may change by the millisecond. Security of financial transactions, being executed from some remote location and transmission of financial information over the air, are the most complicated challenges that need to be addressed jointly by mobile application developers, wireless network service providers and the banks' IT departments.

One-time passwords (OTPs) are one tool used by financial and banking service providers in the fight against cyber fraud. Instead of relying on traditional memorized passwords, OTPs are requested by consumers each time they want to perform transactions using the online or mobile banking interface. When the request is received the password is sent to the consumer's phone via SMS. The password is expired once it has been used or once its scheduled life-cycle has expired.

=== Scalability and reliability ===
Another challenge for the CIOs and CTOs of the banks is to scale-up the mobile banking infrastructure to handle exponential growth of the customer base. With mobile banking, the customer may be sitting in any part of the world (true anytime, anywhere banking) and hence banks need to ensure that the systems are up and running in a true 24 × 7 fashion. As customers will find mobile banking more and more useful, their expectations will increase. Banks unable to meet the performance and reliability expectations may lose customer confidence. There are systems such as Mobile Transaction Platform which allow quick and secure mobile enabling of various banking services. Recently in India there has been a phenomenal growth in the use of Mobile Banking applications, with leading banks adopting Mobile Transaction Platform and the Central Bank publishing guidelines for mobile banking operations.

=== Application distribution ===
Due to the nature of the connectivity between bank and its customers, it would be impractical to expect customers to regularly visit banks or connect to a web site for regular upgrade of their mobile banking application. It will be expected that the mobile application itself check the upgrades and updates and download necessary patches (so called "Over The Air" updates). However, there could be many issues to implement this approach such as upgrade / synchronization of other dependent components.

Studies have shown that a huge concerning factor of having mobile banking more widely used, is a banking customer's unwillingness to adapt. Many consumers, whether they are misinformed or not, do not want to begin using mobile banking for several reasons. These can include the learning curve associated with new technology, having fears about possible security compromises, just simply not wanting to start using technology, etc.

=== Personalization ===
It would be expected from the mobile application to support personalization such as:

1. Preferred Language
2. Date / Time format
3. Amount format
4. Default transactions
5. Standard Beneficiary list
6. Alerts

== Mobile banking in the world ==
This is a list of countries by mobile banking usage as measured by the percentage of people who had non-SMS mobile banking transactions in the previous three months. The data is sourced from Bain, Research Now and Bain along with GMI NPS surveys in 2012.

Rank	Country/Territory	Usage in 2012
1	South Korea	47%
2	China	42%
3	Hong Kong	41%
4	Singapore	38%
5	India	37%
6	Spain	34%
7	United States	32%
8	Mexico	30%
9	Australia	27%
10	France	26%
11	United Kingdom	26%
12	Thailand	24%
13	Canada	22%
14	Germany	14%
15	Pakistan	9%

African nations such as Kenya would rank highly if SMS mobile banking were included in the above list. Kenya has 38% of the population as subscribers to M-Pesa as of 2011. Though as of 2016 mobile banking applications have seen a tremendous growth in Kenyan banking sector who have capitalised on android play store and apple store to put their applications. Kenyan banks like Equity Bank Kenya Limited Eazzy banking application and The Co-operative Bank Mco-op cash application have proved to be a success mobile banking applications.

Mobile banking is used in many parts of the world with little or no infrastructure, especially remote and rural areas. This aspect of mobile commerce is also popular in countries where most of their population is unbanked. In most of these places, banks can only be found in big cities, and customers have to travel hundreds of miles to the nearest bank.

In Iran, banks such as Parsian, Tejarat, Pasargad Bank, Mellat, Saderat, Sepah, Edbi, and Bankmelli offer the service. Banco Industrial provides the service in Guatemala. Citizens of Mexico can access mobile banking with Omnilife, Bancomer and MPower Venture. Kenya's Safaricom (part of the Vodafone Group) has the M-Pesa Service, which is mainly used to transfer limited amounts of money, but increasingly used to pay utility bills as well. In 2009, Zain launched their own mobile money transfer business, known as ZAP, in Kenya and other African countries. Several other players in Kenya such as Tangerine, MobiKash and Funtrench Limited also have network-independent mobile money transfer. In Somalia, the many telecom companies provide mobile banking, the most prominent being Hormuud Telecom and its ZAAD service.

Telenor Pakistan has also launched a mobile banking service in coordination with Taameer Bank, under the label Easy Paisa, which was begun in Q4 2009. Eko India Financial Services, the business correspondent of State Bank of India (SBI) and ICICI Bank, provides bank accounts, deposit, withdrawal and remittance services, micro-insurance, and micro-finance facilities to its customers (nearly 80% of whom are migrants or the unbanked section of the population) through mobile banking.

In a year of 2010, mobile banking users soared over 100 percent in Kenya, China, Brazil and United States with 200 percent, 150 percent, 110 percent and 100 percent respectively.

Dutch Bangla Bank launched the first mobile banking service in Bangladesh on 31 March 2011. This service is launched with 'Agent' and 'Network' support from mobile operators, Banglalink and Citycell. Sybase 365, a subsidiary of Sybase, Inc. has provided software service with their local partner Neurosoft Technologies Ltd. There are around 160 million people in Bangladesh, of which, only 13 per cent have bank accounts. With this service, Dutch-Bangla Bank can now reach out to the rural and unbanked population, of which, 45 per cent are mobile phone users. Under the service, any mobile handset with subscription to any of the six existing mobile operators of Bangladesh would be able to utilize the service. Under the mobile banking services, bank-nominated Banking agent performs banking activities on its behalf, like opening mobile banking accounts, providing cash services (receipts and payments) and dealing with small credits. Cash withdrawal from a mobile account can also be done from an ATM validating each transaction by 'mobile phone & PIN' instead of 'card & PIN'. Other services that are being delivered through mobile banking system are person-to-person (e.g. fund transfer), person-to-business (e.g. merchant payment, utility bill payment), business-to-person (e.g. salary/commission disbursement), government-to-person (disbursement of government allowance) transactions. One of the most recent mobile technological wonders (Shaikh and Karjaluoto, 2015) and one of the most recent financial services sector innovations which has added a pure mobility element to service consumption (Mishra and Bisht, 2013; Oliveira et al., 2014) that in return enabled customers to have a convenient access to different value-added banking services is mobile banking (MB) or m-banking (Anderson, 2010). M-banking is defined as “a feed where the consumer communicates with a bank using a mobile device, such as a mobile phone or personal digital assistant. In that sense, it can be seen as a subset of electronic banking and an extension of internet banking with its own unique characteristics (Laukkanen & Pasanen, 2008). It is one of the newest approaches to the concern of financial services through information computer technology (ICT), made possible by the extensive adoption of mobile phones even in low income countries (Anderson, 2010). In May 2012, Laxmi Bank Limited launched the very first mobile banking in Nepal with its product Mobile Khata. Mobile Khata currently runs on a third-party platform called Hello Paisa that is interoperable with all the telecoms in Nepal viz. Nepal Telecom, NCell, Smart Tel and UTL, and is also interoperable with various banks in the country. The initial joining members to the platform after Laxmi Bank Limited were Siddartha Bank, Bank of Kathmandu, Commerz and Trust Bank Nepal and International Leasing and Finance Company. In country with roughly 30 million population, over 5 million have subscribed to mobile banking in Nepal as per the recent data from Nepal Rastra Bank, the central bank of Nepal.

Barclays offers a service called Barclays Pingit, and Hello Money offering services in Africa, allowing transfer of money from the United Kingdom to many parts of the world with a mobile phone. Pingit is owned by a consortium of banks. In April 2014, the UK Payments Council launched the Paym mobile payment system, allowing mobile payments between customers of several banks and building societies using the recipient's mobile phone number. in past some US research proved that in the United States, people focusing in on adaptable banking (m-banking), this work contemplates responses from three undeniable buyer parcels, including – 1) customers living in Egypt, 2) purchasers from Egypt who are living in the U.S. in addition, 3) U.S. customers. The conceptual model was developed by the technology acceptance model (TAM), task-technology fit model (TTF), theory of planned behavior model (TPB), the diffusion of innovation model (DOI).

In November 2017, the State Bank of India launched an integrated banking platform in India called YONO offering conventional banking functions but also payment services for things such as online shopping, travel planning, taxi booking or online education.

In January 2019, the German direct bank N26 overtook Revolut as the most valuable mobile bank in Europe with a valuation of $2.7 billion and 1.5 million users.

Following is a list showing the share of people using mobile banking apps during the last three months in selected countries worldwide in 2014. The list is based on a survey conducted by statista.com including 82,914 respondents.

Rank	Country/Territory	Usage in 2014
1	Indonesia	77%
2	China	73%
3	Thailand	64%
4	India	59%
5	Singapore	58%
6	Poland	58%
7	Malaysia	54%
8	Hong Kong	49%
9	Australia	47%
10	Mexico	45%
11	Spain	44%
12	United States	43%
13	Italy	42%
14	United Kingdom	41%
15	Brazil	39%
16	Canada	34%
17	Portugal	31%
18	France	30%
19	Belgium	27%
20	Germany	21%
21	Japan	19%

== See also ==
- Contactless payment
- Direct bank
- Digital currency
- List of countries by mobile banking usage
- Mobile content
- Mobile Marketing
- Mobile payments
- Online banking
- Digital Wallet
- SMS Banking
- Telephone banking
