= Industry Sorting Code Directory =

The Industry Sorting Code Directory (ISCD) is the definitive list of bank branches and sub branches in the United Kingdom. The directory is maintained by VocaLink on behalf of UK Payments Administration (formally APACS).

The ISCD contains the sort code, SWIFT Bank Identifier Code (BIC), payment information, clearing information and contact details for all bank branches and sub-branches involved in the UK payment clearing system.

The ISCD is used by organisations to check the validity of sorting codes, which, combined with modulus checking of the bank account number and sorting code, is essential for successful Direct Debit and BACS Credit transactions.

The information contained within the ISCD is subject to frequent changes. To ensure that organisations have access to accurate information, VocaLink updates the ISCD once a week and makes it available to download. To obtain the ISCD, organisations must register with VocaLink or one of its official ISCD distributors.

== Extended Industry Sorting Code Directory ==
The Extended Industry Sorting Code Directory (EISCD) is based upon the ISCD and was introduced to provide reference data to support the UK's Faster Payments service. The EISCD contains all data elements found within the ISCD, with the addition of a new section containing Faster Payments clearing information for each UK bank branch.

The EISCD is updated weekly and is available from VocaLink and authorised distributors.
