= Payments Council =

Payments Council logo

The Payments Council was an organisation of financial institutions in the United Kingdom, which set strategy for UK payment mechanisms from 2007 until 2015.

== History ==
In his 2003 Pre-Budget Report, then-Chancellor Gordon Brown announced that the Office of Fair Trading (OFT) would lead a new Payments Systems Task Force. The OFT recommended to the Chancellor in 2006 that the Task Force should establish a new body responsible for the integrity and efficiency of co-operative payment systems in the UK. This was set up as the Payments Council in 2007.

By the time of a planned two-year OFT review in 2009, the Payments Council had taken over some activities from the Association for Payment Clearing Services (APACS), which no longer exists. One of the tasks of the Payments Council was to implement the Faster Payments Service, taking clearing times in the UK from among the slowest to among the fastest in the world. Criticisms made in 2009 included delays and shortcomings in delivery, and inability to ensure that Faster Payments members promptly passed on benefits to their customers.

In 2010, it sponsored the Sort Code Validation Accreditation Scheme (SCVAS), which aimed to improve the distribution and validation of bank reference data within the UK payments industry. This was to be achieved via commercial providers offering products and services to verify sort codes used in electronic payment processing.

The Payments Council clashed with the Government in 2011 over plans to abolish cheques. This led to a government consultation on separating the regulatory function from the industry body.

The Payments Council went on to implement the mobile payment system Paym and the Current Account Switch Service (CASS).

In April 2015, the regulatory powers of the Payments Council were transferred to a new body, the Payment Systems Regulator, set up by the Financial Conduct Authority in accordance with section 40 of the Financial Services (Banking Reform) Act 2013. On 29 June 2015, the Payments Council was then relaunched as the trade association Payments UK.

== Structure ==
=== Board ===
The board of the Payments Council consisted of:

- Independent non-voting chairman
- Fifteen voting directors
- An observer from the Bank of England

Of the fifteen directors on the Board, eleven were industry-appointed directors who represented a cross section of Payments Council membership, and four independent directors.

Each independent director held one voting seat and was appointed for a period of three years, which could be extended once for a further three years. The independent directors together had the power of veto and produced an annual report each year.

=== Membership ===
The Payments Council was a voluntary membership organisation, with a mix of full and associate members.

=== Contracts ===
On behalf of the UK payments industry as a whole, the Payments Council operated contracts with service providers such as BACS, CHAPS, Faster Payments, Cheque and Credit Clearing Company Limited and the LINK ATM Scheme.

== National Payments Plan ==
The National Payments Plan was an annual document in which the Payments Council set out its strategic vision for the future development of payment services in the UK.

The first national payments plan was published in May 2008 and updates were published on an annual basis.

== Closure of cheque clearing ==
The first major move of the Payments Council, in 2009, was to agree to a target of 2018 for the closure of cheque clearing in the UK. It also announced that the cheque guarantee card scheme would end in June 2011.

The Payments Council advised a Treasury Select Committee inquiry in February 2010 that cheques were in "terminal decline", down to 3.5 million per day in 2009 from a peak of 11 million in 1990. After lobbying from the charity sector, the Council reaffirmed in October 2010 that the 2018 closure is conditional on adequate alternatives being in place by 2016.

However, in April 2011 the Select Committee reopened its inquiry into the 2018 target date, after receiving a large volume of correspondence from small businesses, voluntary organisations and older people who were still using cheques. The inquiry will also consider the structure and performance of the Payments Council, including whether it is sufficiently accountable for the impact of its decisions on consumers.

The chairman of the inquiry, Andrew Tyrie MP, stated, "The Payments Council has not thought through its arguments carefully enough and its first piece of work on the cost–benefit of abolishing cheques was clearly defective." The Payments Council welcomed the opportunity to reassure the public that cheques would not be abolished before acceptable alternatives were available.

On 12 July 2011 the Payments Council announced it had cancelled the 2018 target date to close cheque clearing and that cheques will remain as long as customers need them.

The Treasury Select Committee described the matter as a "debacle", stating

The Payments Council was able to take decisions affecting millions of people at its own initiative without any effective scrutiny by a regulatory body.

== See also ==
- UK Payments Administration
- Payments UK, successor body
