= UKPA =

UKPA may refer to:

- UK Payments Administration
- UK Polocrosse Association
- Press Association of the United Kingdom
