= Council of Mortgage Lenders =

Logo of the Council of Mortgage Lenders

The Council of Mortgage Lenders was an industry body representing mortgage lenders in the United Kingdom.

Its members consisted of banks, building societies and specialist lenders and represented 95% of mortgage lending in the UK.

In November 2015 it was confirmed that the Council of Mortgage Lenders would be merged with the British Bankers' Association, Payments UK, the UK Cards Association and the Asset Based Finance Association, following a review into financial trade bodies. It became part of the newly established UK Finance in July 2017.

The CML's Lenders' Handbook for England and Wales (or "the CML Handbook") was used to direct how solicitors and conveyancers handled their role in arranging mortgages and completing sales of property. For example, the handbook required solicitors and conveyancers to ensure that they held a signed mortgage loan agreement to the full value of the advance before completion of a sale, and they were to hold the loan on trust for the lender until completion. The CML Handbook is now the UK Finance Lenders' Handbook.
