= Pingit =

Former British mobile payment service

- Product type: Mobile payments
- Current owner: Barclays
- Country: United Kingdom
- Introduced: February 2012
- Discontinued: June 2021
- Website: www.pingit.com

Pingit, formerly Barclays Pingit, was a British mobile payments service, allowing Barclays account holders to send and receive money transfers through their mobile phones. It operated from 2012 until 2021 when Barclays said that the service was no longer needed as newer payment services became popular.

== History ==
It was launched in February 2012 and expanded in stages to include all account holders, with over 1.2 million downloads reported in its first year.

The applications used for Pingit were iOS and Android and Blackberry. Monetary transfers were made to the account associated with the phone number, not the app itself, so that all types of phones with the app installed were eligible to receive payments.

The Pingit service worked on the Faster Payments Service, so that payments were effectively instantaneous, even between Barclays and non-Barclays customers, and they were free. Pingit was compatible with the Paym mobile payment system which worked across other UK banks.

In July 2015, Barclays teamed up with Zapp to allow Pingit to be used at point of sale terminals in shops, and for Internet transactions where the Pay by Bank app symbol is displayed.

In March 2019, Barclays merged its BPay wearable contactless payments product with the Pingit money transfer app. That August, Barclays launched an online store vending Pingit wearable payments devices, such as watches and key fobs, programmed to process Pingit mobile payments.

On 19 February 2021, Barclays announced that it would be closing Pingit down later in 2021 and subsequently on 12 April 2021, Barclays confirmed that Pingit would close on 30 June 2021.

== See also ==
- Paym
