= Cashline =

UK's Automated Teller Machine by Tesco

Cashline is the name and brand of the Automated Teller Machine (ATM) network in the United Kingdom run by the Royal Bank of Scotland.

== History ==
Its beginnings date back to 1967 when the Royal Bank installed its first ATM in its offices in the West End of Edinburgh. Initially the service offered only basic deposit services to a small select number of customers, but by 1977 the familiar cash withdrawal service to current account holders was launched under the Cashline name.

By 1980, the Cashline network had become the busiest ATM network in the world in terms of how frequently each machine is used and how much money is taken out each time. Cashline ATMs up until the mid-1980s were usually of De La Rue or IBM-Diebold manufacture, before being progressively replaced by NCR machines. Cashline is a member of the LINK network, and in 1997 took the step of being available to all cardholders, irrespective of the ATM network their own particular bank belonged.

== Coverage ==
Cashline ATMs are also exclusively found in branches of Tesco supermarkets all over the United Kingdom, operating under the Tesco Personal Finance banner, but with a small "Cashline" below the Tesco lettering.

The word cashline has become a generic name in Scotland used to describe a cash machine.
