= Anthony Browne (politician) =

British journalist, businessman and politician (born 1967)

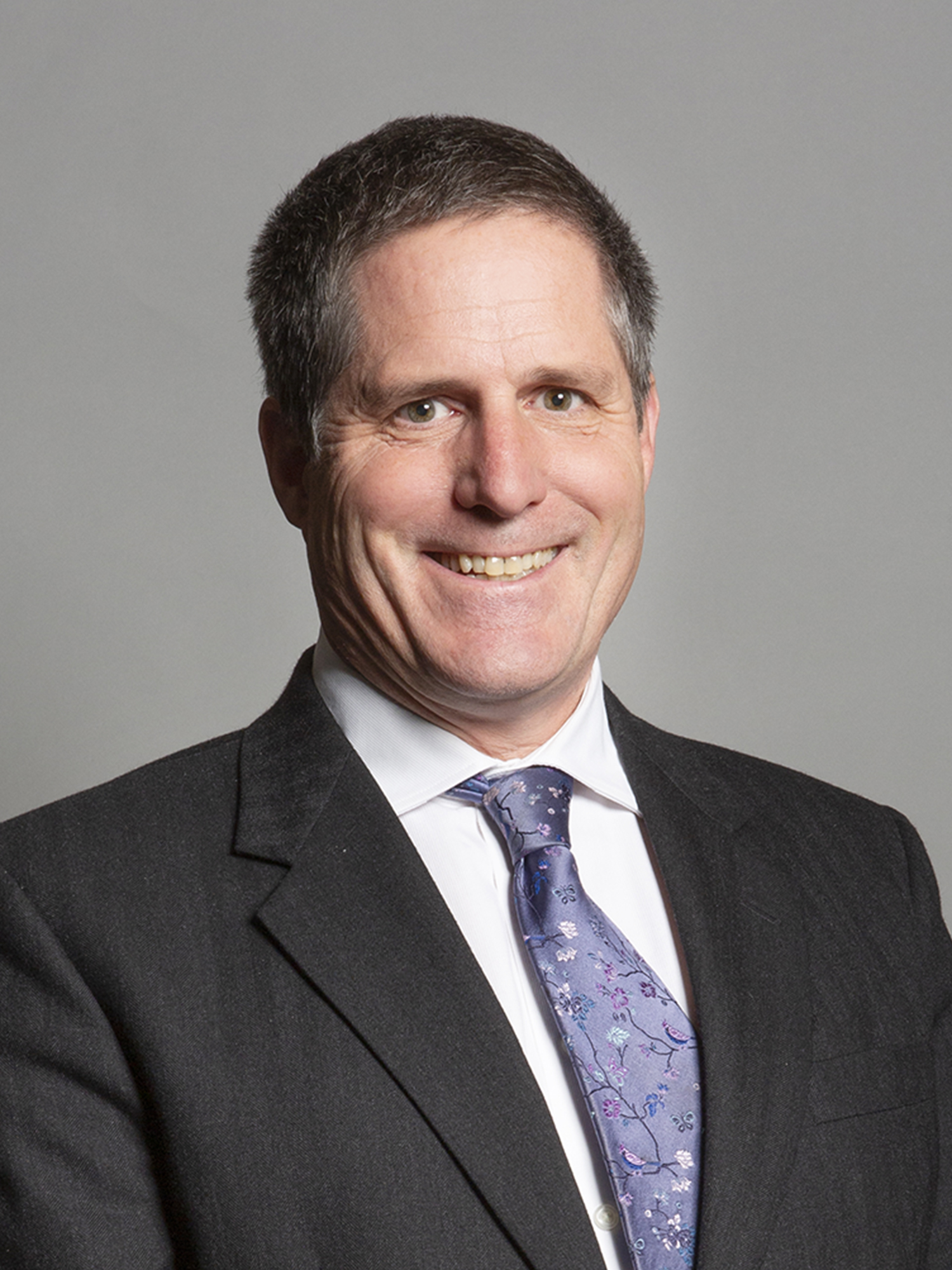
- Official portrait, 2019

Parliamentary Under-Secretary of State for Decarbonisation and Technology
- In office 13 November 2023 – 5 July 2024
- Prime Minister: Rishi Sunak
- Preceded by: Jesse Norman

Member of Parliament for South Cambridgeshire
- In office 12 December 2019 – 30 May 2024
- Preceded by: Heidi Allen
- Succeeded by: Pippa Heylings

Personal details
- Born: Anthony Howe Browne; 19 January 1967 (age 59) Cambridge, Cambridgeshire, England
- Party: Conservative
- Education: The Perse School; Hills Road Sixth Form College; Trinity Hall, Cambridge
- Website: anthonybrowne.org

Anthony Howe Browne (born 19 January 1967) is a British politician, former journalist and public affairs executive who was the Member of Parliament (MP) for South Cambridgeshire from 2019 to 2024. He was appointed the Parliamentary Under Secretary of State of Transport, responsible for aviation, decarbonisation and the future of transport from November 2023 to July 2024. He is a member of the Conservative Party.

Browne was previously a journalist at The Times, BBC and The Observer; an adviser to Boris Johnson when he was Mayor of London; chief executive of the British Bankers' Association and chairman of the UK Government's Regulatory Policy Committee. He sat on the Boards of the International Banking Federation, the European Banking Federation and TheCityUK, and a range of financial technology companies. As an MP, he served three years on the Treasury Select Committee and two years on the Public Accounts Commission as well as Chair of the All-Party Parliamentary Group on the Environment. Browne was appointed as the Prime Minister's first Anti-Fraud Champion.

== Early life ==
Browne was born in Mill Road Maternity Hospital in Cambridge to parents Patrick and Gerd Browne. He went to Fowlmere Primary School and was awarded a bursary to the fee-paying independent sector The Perse School. He did his A levels at the state sector Hills Road Sixth Form College in Cambridge, and then studied mathematics at Trinity Hall, Cambridge, receiving a BA (Hons) in 1988.

== Career ==
=== Journalism ===
Browne began his career as a journalist. He worked for the BBC as a researcher for The Money Programme from 1993 to 1994, before becoming a broadcast journalist at Business Breakfast from 1994 to 1995.

He was business reporter and economics correspondent for the BBC (1993–1998); economics correspondent, health editor and environment correspondent for The Observer newspaper (1998–2002); and environment editor, Europe correspondent, and chief political correspondent for The Times (2002–2007). When Europe correspondent for The Times, he covered the enlargement of the EU to Eastern Europe, and the appointment of Peter Mandelson as European Commissioner. He also reported for The Times from Iraq after the fall of Saddam Hussein.

Browne was a columnist for City AM and one of the founding columnists of the website ConservativeHome. As Environment Editor of the Observer, Browne broke the exclusive that 1999 was the hottest year of the second millennium. Browne was in New York on 11 September 2001, and covered the terrorist attack on the Twin Towers for The Guardian and its sister paper, The Observer.

Browne wrote in 2003 that immigration from Africa had become the main cause of new HIV infections in the UK. In an article the Spectator he suggested that the government's policy of mass migration would claim lives due to "letting in too many germs" and that reducing immigration would have more of an impact on public health than recommending that people use condoms.

=== Think tanks ===
Browne was Director of the centre-right think tank Policy Exchange for eighteen months during 2007 to 2008 where he succeeded the founding director Nick Boles.

Browne has written and contributed to various publications, including a book on whether Britain should join the European single currency, which entered the Sunday Times best-seller list; a pamphlet published by Civitas: The Institute for the Study of Civil Society discussing mass immigration which won Prospect magazine's think tank publication of the year award in 2003; and a Joseph Rowntree Foundation book on social evils; and a report for the think tank Open Europe supporting subsidiarity in the EU.

=== Lobbyist ===
After working for Boris Johnson, Browne became Morgan Stanley's head of government relations for Europe, the Middle East and Africa.

=== British Bankers' Association ===
Browne was appointed to the BBA in June 2012, two weeks before the LIBOR scandal broke. Marcus Agius, the chairman of the BBA who appointed Browne, promptly resigned.

Browne was responsible for implementing reforms of LIBOR proposed by a review led by Martin Wheatley, the then head of the Financial Conduct Authority. Browne then worked with a government-appointed tendering committee chaired by Baroness Hogg to transfer operation of LIBOR from the BBA. Responsibility for the operation of LIBOR was transferred from the BBA to NYSE Euronext in January 2014. As part of the ensuing Parliamentary Commission on Banking Standards, chaired by Andrew Tyrie, Browne co-ordinated the industry to establish the Banking Standards Board.

Browne also set up the BBA's first Consumer Panel. In the wake of the 2016 referendum on Brexit, Browne warned, in an article in The Observer newspaper, that British-based banks were about to relocate operations to the EU, with their hands "quivering over the relocate button".

In April 2017, he announced he was stepping down after five years as CEO, when the BBA merged with five other trade associations to form UK Finance.

=== Politics ===
Browne was Policy Director for Economic Development for Boris Johnson, the Mayor of London, from 2008 to 2011. He was in charge of economic and business policy for London, sitting on the board of the London Development Agency, as an observer on the London Skills and Employment Board, and TheCityUK, which represents UK financial services. He was also chairman of the Mayor's Digital Advisory Board. Browne was the manifesto director for Boris Johnson's successful re-election campaign from 2011 to 2012.

On 20 July 2019, Browne was announced as the Conservative parliamentary candidate for South Cambridgeshire. Labour called for Boris Johnson to reject him as a candidate after accusing him of displaying "disgusting racism" in his journalism in the early 2000s. In an interview with the Cambridge Independent on 24 July 2019 to discuss his selection, Browne sought to distance himself from the views he had expressed as a journalist. When asked about the statements, he said "I went through a phase as a young journalist trying to get attention and it is not language I would use now. I regret saying it."

Browne was elected as member for South Cambridgeshire in December 2019 with a majority of 2,904. He was later elected as a member of the Treasury Select Committee and Chairman of the All Party Parliamentary Group of the Environment in 2020 and serves as a member of the a Public Accounts Commission.

On 5 July 2022, Browne published a letter of no confidence in the Prime Minister Boris Johnson. In the subsequent leadership election, he supported Rishi Sunak.

In September 2022, he was appointed as Parliamentary Private Secretary to the Department for Transport..

Following the publication of the UK Government's Fraud Strategy in May 2023, Browne was appointed as the first Prime Minister's Anti-Fraud Champion. He negotiated the Online Fraud Charter, which committed the twelve main global tech firms to implement 39 different measures to stop scams, and which he launched in November 2023.

As part of the November 2023 British cabinet reshuffle, Browne was appointed as Parliamentary Under Secretary of State for Transport on November 13, 2023. His brief includes responsibility for aviation, decarbonisation of transport, electric cars, autonomous vehicles, sustainable aviation fuel, drones, e-scooters and space. Browne was responsible for passing the Zero Emission Vehicle Mandate which requires car manufacturers to have 80% of their car sales to be zero emission by 2030. He passed the Automated Vehicles Act and was the Minister responsible for the Space (Industries) Indemnity Bill. In April 2024, Browne published the Sustainable Aviation Fuel Mandate, which requires airlines in the UK to use 10% sustainable aviation fuel by 2030.

In March 2023, he was chosen as the Conservative Party Candidate for the new constituency of St Neots and Mid Cambridgeshire in the next general election and Chris Carter-Chapman replacing him as the Conservative Party Candidate for South Cambridgeshire. In the general election of July 2024 he finished second to Liberal Democrat candidate, Ian Sollom, and was not elected.

=== Post-parliamentary career ===
Following his defeat at the 2024 general election, Browne became a founding partner of the public affairs consultancy Prysm Global.

== Personal life ==
Anthony Browne is married to Paula Higgins, the CEO and founder of HomeOwners Alliance. The couple have a son and a daughter. Browne lists his recreations as "walking, running, climbing, eating, drinking, helping caterpillars turn into butterflies".

== Publications ==
- The Euro – Should Britain Join: Yes or No? (Icon Books, 2001)
- NHS Reform: Towards Consensus? (Adam Smith Institute, 2002)
- Do We Need Mass Immigration? (Civitas, 2002)
- The Retreat of Reason – Political Correctness and the Corruption of Public Debate in Modern Britain (Civitas, 2006)
- contributor Contemporary Social Evils (Joseph Rowntree Foundation, 2009)
- The Case for European Localism, with Mats Persson (Open Europe, 2011)

Parliament of the United Kingdom
Preceded by Heidi Allen	Member of Parliament for South Cambridgeshire; 2019–2024	Succeeded by Pippa Heylings
