= Alastair Hanton =

British inventor of the Direct Debit (1926–2021)

Alastair Hanton OBE
- Born: 10 October 1926
- Died: 26 May 2021 (aged 94)
- Education: Pembroke College, Cambridge
- Occupations: Civil servant, banker, social entrepreneur, transport campaigner
- Organization: Girobank
- Known for: Inventor of direct debit.
- Spouse: Margaret Lumsden
- Children: 3
- Website: https://hanton.co.uk/

Alastair Kydd Hanton (10 October 1926 – 26 May 2021) was a British banker, civil servant, transport campaigner, and social entrepreneur who invented the direct debit system in 1964.

Hanton was appointed an OBE in the 1986 New Year Honours on his retirement as deputy managing director of National Girobank.

== Biography ==
=== Early life ===
Hanton was born in north London on 10 October 1926.

His father, Peter Kydd Hanton, worked as an architect for the Ministry of Works. His mother, Maud (née Evans), was a secretary.

==== Education ====
Following schooling at Mill Hill School, including a period evacuated to St Bees in Cumberland during World War II, Hanton went to Pembroke College, Cambridge, to study maths and economics.

=== Career ===
After graduating, 22-year-old Hanton joined the newly founded government overseas aid organisation, the Colonial Development Corporation, in 1948, and after two years at head office in London, he was posted to Malawi to plan public works.

In 1957, Hanton took a job at the Industrial and Commercial Finance Corporation (ICFC, now 3i), which provided financial support for small firms. A year later, Hanton joined the Economics and Statistics Division of Unilever.

After joining Rio Tinto-Zinc Corporation in 1964, he developed the use of the discounted cash flow technique and contributed to the book The Finance and Analysis of Capital Projects.

Hanton left Rio Tinto after four years to help found the new National Giro in 1968, retiring from the organisation in 1987.

==== Direct debit ====
Direct debit was invented by Alastair Hanton while he was working at Unilever as a way of collecting payments more efficiently from Wall's ice cream sellers. Originally named automatic debit transfer, it commenced operation, as a paper-based system, in 1964, becoming widely available from 1968.

"I began with the name automatic debit transfer (ADT) and then during the discussion we shortened that… direct debit was, well, more direct…"

— Alastair Hanton

==== National Giro ====
In 1982, Hanton was promoted from Operations Director to Deputy Managing Director.

In 1985, Hanton initiated the LINK ATM network that allowed customers to withdraw money from ATMs of banks other than their own.

=== Charity and campaign work ===
Hanton was one of the founders of The Fairtrade Foundation.

Hanton also founded the Environmental Transport Association, was vice-chairman of Christian Aid, and chair of Living Streets and the London Cycling Campaign.

=== Family ===
Hanton married Margaret Lumsden, a market researcher and Cambridge graduate, in 1956. They had two sons and a daughter.
