= Continuous payment authority =

A continuous payment authority (CPA) is a type of regular automatic payment where an individual gives a vendor permission to take money from a credit or debit account whenever the vendor feels money is owed. They are often used by payday lenders, gym memberships, and subscription sites such as those for magazines.

Continuous payment authorities should not be confused with direct debit arrangements or standing orders. Often there is no written record of them, and the payer (whose credit or debit card the CPA is linked to) can cancel them by contacting the vendor or their bank. Concerns have been raised about abuse of CPAs by companies to withdraw money from the accounts of unsuspecting customers, who often do not realise the terms and conditions associated with use of the service.

== Cancellation rights ==
In the United Kingdom, a consumer can cancel a continuous payment authority by contacting either the business taking the payment or their card issuer. The Financial Conduct Authority states that, once a customer asks their card issuer to cancel a recurring card payment, the card issuer must stop the payments, even if the customer has not contacted the business first.

The FCA’s consumer credit rules also provide that a firm must cease to exercise its rights under a continuous payment authority once it has been notified that the authority has been cancelled.

== See also ==
- Direct debit
- Standing order
