= ISCD =

ISCD refer to:

As an initialism, acronym, or symbol:

- Industry Sorting Code Directory
- Independent Scientific Committee on Drugs (UK drug advisory body), now rebranded DrugScience
- Israel Sports Center for the Disabled
- International Society for Clinical Densitometry
