= National Electronic Funds Transfer =

Indian electronic funds transfer system

National Electronic Funds Transfer (NEFT) is an electronic funds transfer system maintained by the Reserve Bank of India (RBI). Started in November 2005, the setup was established and maintained by Institute for Development and Research in Banking Technology. NEFT enables bank customers in India to transfer funds between any two NEFT-enabled bank accounts on a one-to-one basis. It is done via electronic messages.

Unlike real-time gross settlement, fund transfers through the NEFT system do not occur in real-time basis. Previously, NEFT system settled fund transfers in hourly batches with 23 settlements occurring between 00:30 hrs. to 00:00 hrs.

From 16 December 2019, there would be 48 half-hourly batches occurring between 00.30 am to 00:00 am every day regardless of a holiday or otherwise.

As of 30 November 2019, NEFT facilities were available at 1,48,477 branches/offices of 216 banks across the country and online through the website of NEFT-enabled banks. NEFT has gained popularity due to the ease and efficiency with which the transactions can be concluded.

There is no limit – either minimum or maximum – on the amount of funds that can be transferred using NEFT.

== Process ==
Detailed process of NEFT is as follows:

1. The customer fills up an application form providing details of the beneficiary (like name, bank, branch name, IFSC, account type and account number) and the amount to be remitted. The remitter authorizes his/her bank branch to debit his account and remit the specified amount to the beneficiary. This facility is also available through online banking, and some banks also offer the NEFT facility through ATMs.
2. The originating bank branch prepares a message and sends the message to its pooling centre (also called the NEFT Service Centre).
3. The pooling centre forwards the message to the NEFT Clearing Centre (operated by National Clearing Cell, Reserve Bank of India, Mumbai) to be included for the next available batch.
4. The Clearing Centre sorts the funds transfer transactions destination bank-wise and prepares accounting entries to receive funds from the originating banks (debit) and give the funds to the destination banks (credit). Thereafter, bank-wise remittance messages are forwarded to the destination banks through their pooling centre (NEFT Service Centre).
5. The destination banks receive the inward remittance messages from the Clearing Centre and pass on the credit to the beneficiary customers’ accounts.

== Settlement timings ==
NEFT transfers are settled in half-hourly batches every day between 00:30 am and 00:00 am all through the year.

NEFT originally settled fund transfers in hourly batches. The RBI reduced clearance times to half-hourly batches in April 2016. In August 2019, the RBI announced that it would enable round-the-clock settlements from 16 December 2019.

== Service charges ==
The structure of charges is as follows:

Inward transactions at destination bank branches (for credit to beneficiary accounts):

- Free, no charges to be collected from beneficiaries

Outward transactions at originating bank branches (charges for the remitter):

- With effect from 1 January 2020, banks have been advised to not levy any charges from their savings bank account holders for NEFT funds transfers initiated online.
- Maximum charges which can be levied for outward transactions at originating bank for other transactions, i.e. offline transactions (at bank branch through NEFT form), transactions done through current/other accounts –
  - For transactions up to ₹ 10,000: not exceeding ₹ 2.50 (+ Applicable GST)
  - For transactions above ₹ 10,000 up to ₹ 1 lakh: not exceeding ₹ 5 (+ Applicable GST)
  - For transactions above ₹ 1 lakh and up to ₹ 2 lakhs: not exceeding ₹ 15 (+ Applicable GST)
  - For transactions above ₹ 2 lakhs: not exceeding ₹ 25 (+ Applicable GST)

The scenario varies from bank to bank, whether they levy this charge or not immatter of the transaction done online or offline for the accounts other than a savings bank account.

The RBI announced on 11 June 2019 that all charges for NEFT and real-time gross settlement transactions collected from banks would be waived from 1 July 2019, and asked banks to pass on the benefits to customers (so RBI charges nothing for these transactions to its member banks and the only charge that is levied is by the bank through which the outward transaction is initiated).

== Statistics ==
216.71 million National Electronic Funds Transfers transactions worth ₹1,811,780.90 crore (equivalent to ₹23 trillion or US$238.13 billion in 2023) were made in September 2019, as against 661 million transactions worth ₹44 trillion (US$470 billion) the entire year 2013–15.
