= Faster Payment System (United Kingdom) =

British payment system

- Short name: FPS
- Location: United Kingdom
- Launched: May 27, 2008
- Predecessor: BACS
- Technology: Real-time gross settlement (RTGS) for low-value payments
- Operator: Pay.UK (via subsidiary Faster Payments Scheme Limited)
- Currency: GBP (£) (£1 million (set by individual banks) maximum load)

The Faster Payment System (FPS) is a United Kingdom real-time gross settlement system which facilitates transfers between different banks' customer accounts within a few seconds. The system offers faster settlement times than the long-established BACS and CHAPS systems. FPS processes a large volume of small payments, subject to limits set by the individual banks, with some allowing Faster Payments of up to £1 million. Transfer time, while expected to be short, is not guaranteed, nor is it guaranteed that the receiving institution will immediately credit the payee's account.

On 1 May 2018 the Bank of England announced that the New Payment System Operator (NPSO), which had been rebranded as Pay.UK in 2017, had taken over responsibility for the operation of the Bacs and Faster Payments systems and Faster Payments announced that it had become a subsidiary company of Pay.UK.

== Background ==
In November 1998 the UK Treasury commissioned the Cruickshank Report, a review of competition within the UK banking sector, which was completed in March 2000. Among its recommendations was primary legislation to establish an independent payment systems commission (PayCom) in place of existing, privately controlled interbank arrangements. The following day, Chancellor Gordon Brown announced that legislation would be introduced, if necessary, to open payment systems to increased competition. Initially the banking industry was consulted by the government on further steps and progress in payment services monitored by the Competition Commission and the Office of Fair Trading (OFT).

By May 2003, while the OFT was able to report modest improvements, such as changes to BACS and the governance of APACS, some competition concerns remained and, in December 2003, the Treasury announced the OFT would take on an enhanced role in relation to payment systems, for a period of four years to resolve outstanding competition problems in advance of any legislation – essentially self-regulation. In March 2004 the OFT announced the formation of a joint government-industry body, the Payments Systems Task Force, under its chairmanship.

=== Agreement ===
In May 2005 the task force announced that an agreement had been reached to reduce clearing times for phone, Internet and standing order payments. This committed the payments services industry to develop a system able to clear automated payments in no more than half a day – the so-called ELLE model – resulting in payment being received the same day if made sufficiently early. Implementation groups were given six months to bring forward detailed proposals.

In October 2005 the contract to provide the central infrastructure for this new service was awarded by APACS to Immediate Payments Limited, a joint venture company set up by Voca and LINK, who have since merged to form Vocalink.

In December 2005 the Payment Systems Task Force accepted an APACS recommendation for a still more ambitious target on payment times to ensure access to funds within a couple of hours of any payment being made, and allowing payments to be sent 24 hours a day, 7 days a week, to be available by November 2007. This stage also marked formal dissolution of the Task Force and reformation as a permanent body, the Payments Industry Association (later Payments Council), responsible for governance of all payments systems, including Faster Payments.

== Launch ==
FPS was officially launched on 27 May 2008. Testing during the previous week had allowed users to process very small-value (1p) transactions as "faster payments" for non-scheduled, "immediate" payments only (about 5% of traffic). Access for future-dated payments and standing orders was available from 6 June. In practice, the service was severely limited by the approach of individual member banks to its adoption (see Implementation). A general online sort code checker was made available through APACS shortly ahead of launch, which shows whether a specific sort code is able to receive Faster Payments.

Nine banks and one building society, accounting for about 95% of payments traffic, initially committed to using the service; as of May 2025 there were 46 direct participants. For smaller organisations such as building societies and savings institutions, the service is available through agency arrangements with a direct participant. Initially, there were few announcements regarding charges for Faster Payments; it had been expected to be around £1–£5 for immediate payments by business users. As of 2018 no retail bank charges personal customers for this service (with non-guaranteed transfer time).

== Organisation ==
APACS was responsible for the development and delivery of Faster Payments, but after May 2008 transferred day-to-day operations and management of the service to the CHAPS Clearing Company (a member-based organisation responsible for the CHAPS sterling high-value same-day payment system.) Towards the end of 2011, Faster Payments Scheme Limited (a member-based organisation) was set up to separate out the day-to-day operations and management of the service from CHAPS.

VocaLink continues to provide and operate the infrastructure for the service.

=== Participating members ===
The original founding members of the new service were Abbey (now Santander UK), Alliance & Leicester (now part of Santander UK), Bank of Scotland (including Halifax), Barclays, Citi, Clydesdale Bank (including Yorkshire Bank, both now Virgin Money), The Co-operative Bank, HSBC, Lloyds TSB (now Lloyds Bank and TSB), Nationwide Building Society, Northern Bank (now Danske Bank), Northern Rock (now part of Virgin Money) and The Royal Bank of Scotland (including NatWest and Ulster Bank).

Abbey and Alliance & Leicester merged their membership under Santander UK in February 2011; Bank of Scotland merged their membership into Lloyds Banking Group in September 2011 and Northern Rock resigned from membership in October 2011. The remaining ten members became the initial shareholders of Faster Payments Scheme Limited in November 2011.

In December 2016, Metro Bank joined the system, the first High Street bank to do so since its inception.

Later, in January 2017, Starling Bank joined the service as a direct partner, the first digital-only bank in the system's history.

In February 2018, Ebury became the first to join as a directly connected non settling participant, DCNSp.

In April 2018, TransferWise joined Faster Payments as the first non-bank payment service provider to be a directly connected settling participant, after being the first of its kind to gain access to Bank of England's Real-Time Gross Settlement (RTGS) system.

In February 2019, Equals Money joined Faster Payments as the fourth non-bank to be directly connected. There are now 40 bank and non-bank members.

=== Implementation ===
Following the initial launch of the central infrastructure, work was planned to provide a direct corporate access channel, and the first such payment was made in July 2009. This will ultimately enable businesses to submit large numbers of payments directly into the Faster Payments Service.

From 6 September 2010, the value limit for all payment types was raised to £100,000. The limit is now £1 million. However, "organisations offering the service can set their own limits, depending on how the payment is sent, and the type of account their customer is sending from."

On 1 January 2012, Regulation 70 in the Payment Services Regulations 2009 went into effect, requiring that all standing orders be settled within a day of submission. This shifted about five million payments from the BACS system to FPS, putting monthly volumes above 20 million. FPS handled 967.6 million transactions in 2013, up 19% from the prior year. The total value of transactions in 2013 was £771.4 billion, up 25% over 2012.

== Future ==
In November 2024, the Treasury published a vision paper on the future of national payment infrastructure in the UK. The paper set out how upgrades to the Faster Payments System will be explored, and mooted additional infrastructure which could be made available to leverage the UK's expanding FinTech sector.

In July 2025, Governor of the Bank of England, Andrew Bailey, revealed during his Mansion House speech that the central bank had been tasked with finding a replacement to the Faster Payments System to handle the next generation of consumer payments. He described the Faster Payments System as being part of ageing infrastructure.
