= Real-time gross settlement =

Electronic fund transfer system

Real-time gross settlement (RTGS) systems are specialist funds transfer systems where the transfer of money or securities takes place from one bank to any other bank on a "real-time" and on a "gross" basis to avoid settlement risk. Settlement in "real time" means a payment transaction is not subjected to any waiting period, with transactions being settled as soon as they are processed. However, real time does not necessarily mean immediately or instantly and can be subject to processing (e.g., wire transfers via FedWire are real time but can take hours in some cases while the issuing or reviewing bank’s wire room reviews or processes it, if necessary). "Gross settlement" means the transaction is settled on a one-to-one basis, without bundling or netting with any other transaction. "Settlement" means that once processed, payments are final and irrevocable.

== History ==
As of 1985, three central banks implemented RTGS systems, while by the end of 2005, RTGS systems had been implemented by 90 central banks.

The first system that had the attributes of an RTGS system was the US Fedwire system which was launched in 1970. This was based on a previous method of transferring funds electronically between US federal reserve banks via telegraph. The United Kingdom and France both independently developed RTGS type systems in 1984. The UK system was developed by the Bankers' Clearing House in February 1984 and was called CHAPS. The French system was called SAGITTAIRE. A number of other developed countries launched systems over the next few years. These systems were diverse in operation and technology, being country-specific as they were usually based upon previous processes and procedures used in each country.

In the 1990s international finance organizations emphasized the importance of large-value funds transfer systems which banks use to settle interbank transfers for their own account as well as for their customers as a key part of a country's financial market infrastructure. By 1997 a number of countries, inside as well as outside the Group of Ten, had introduced real-time gross settlement systems for large-value funds transfers. Nearly all G-10 countries had plans to have RTGS systems in operation in the course of 1997 and many other countries were also considering introducing such systems.

== Operation ==
RTGS systems are usually operated by a country's central bank as it is seen as critical infrastructure for a country's economy. Economists believe that an efficient national payment system reduces the cost of exchanging goods and services, and is indispensable to the functioning of the interbank, money, and capital markets. A weak payment system may severely drag on the stability and developmental capacity of a national economy; its failures can result in inefficient use of financial resources, inequitable risk-sharing among agents, actual losses for participants, and loss of confidence in the financial system and in the very use of money.

RTGS system does not require any physical exchange of money; the central bank makes adjustments in the electronic accounts of Bank A and Bank B, reducing the balance in Bank A’s account by the amount in question and increasing the balance of Bank B’s account by the same amount. The RTGS system is suited for low-volume, high-value transactions. It lowers settlement risk, besides giving an accurate picture of an institution’s account at any point in time. The objective of RTGS systems by central banks throughout the world is to minimize risk in high-value electronic payment settlement systems. In an RTGS system, transactions are settled across accounts held at a central bank on a continuous gross basis. The settlement is immediate, final, and irrevocable. Credit risks due to settlement lags are eliminated. The best RTGS national payment systems cover up to 95% of high-value transactions within the national monetary market.

RTGS systems are an alternative to systems of settling transactions at the end of the day, also known as the net settlement system, such as the BACS system in the United Kingdom. In a net settlement system, all the inter-institution transactions during the day are accumulated, and at the end of the day, the central bank adjusts the accounts of the institutions by the net amounts of these transactions.

The World Bank has been paying increasing attention to payment system development as a key component of the financial infrastructure of a country and has provided various forms of assistance to over 100 countries. Most of the RTGS systems in place are secure and have been designed around international standards and best practices.

There are several reasons for central banks to adopt RTGS. First, a decision to adopt is influenced by competitive pressure from the global financial markets. Second, it is more beneficial to adopt an RTGS system for the central bank when this allows access to a broad system of other countries' RTGS systems. Third, it is very likely that the knowledge acquired through experiences with RTGS systems spills over to other central banks and helps them make their adoption decision. Fourth, central banks do not necessarily have to install and develop RTGS themselves. The possibility of sharing development with providers that have built RTGS systems in more than one country (CGI of UK holding the IP, CMA Small System of Sweden, JV Perago of South Africa, SIA S.p.A. of Italy and Montran of USA) has presumably lowered the cost and hence made it feasible for many countries to adopt.

== Existing systems ==
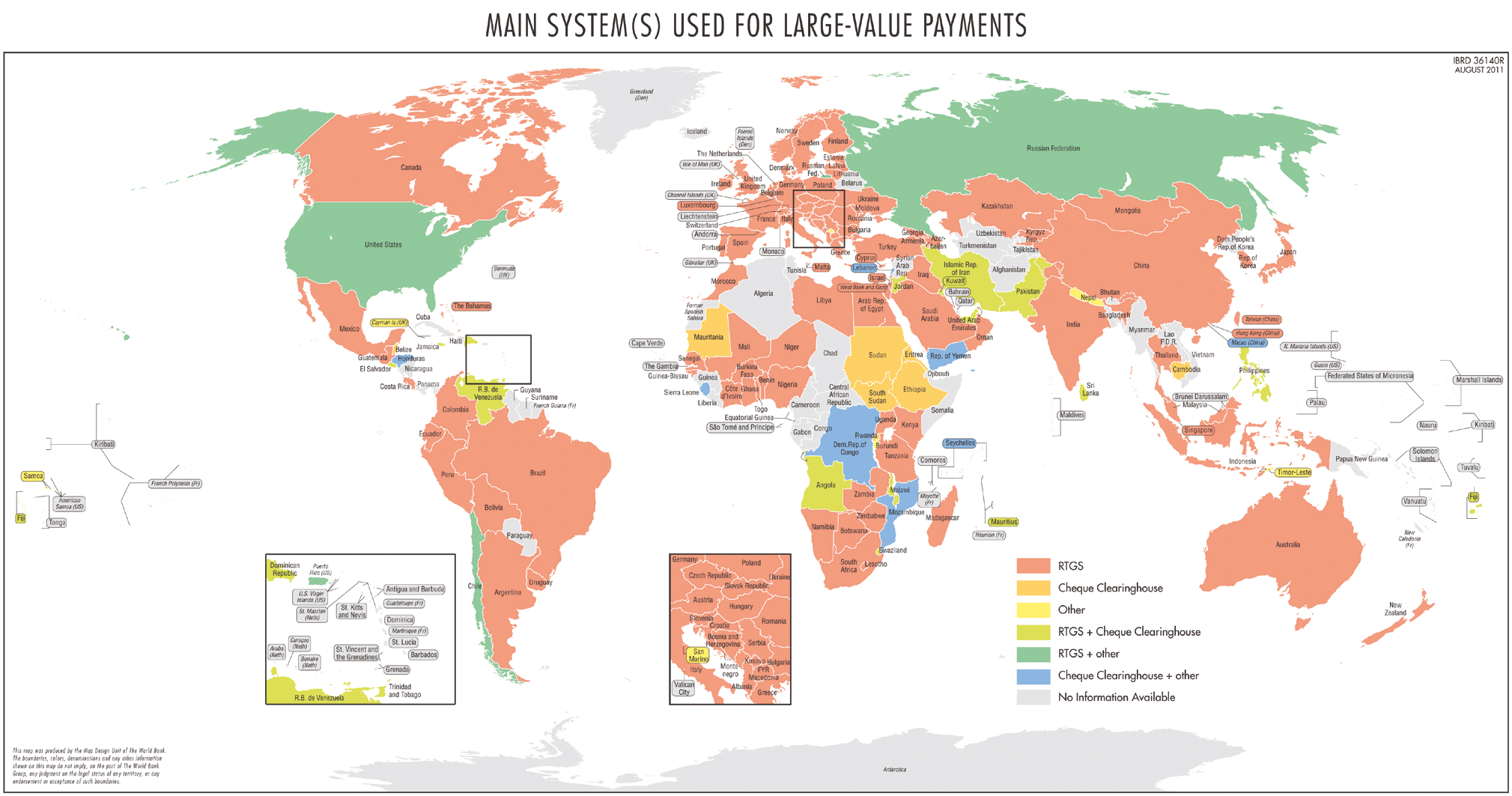
World map with main systems used for large-value payments

Below is a listing of countries and their RTGS systems:

Country	System
African Union	PAPSS (Pan-African Payment and Settlement System)
Angola	SPTR (Portuguese: Sistema de pagamentos em tempo real; Real-time Payment System)
Argentina	MEP (Spanish: Medio electrónico de pagos; Electronic Means of Payment)
Azerbaijan	AZIPS (Azerbaijan Interbank Payment System)
Australia	RITS (Reserve Bank Information and Transfer System)
Bahrain	RTGS (Real Time Gross Settlement System)
Bangladesh	BD-RTGS (Bangladesh Bank Payment Service Division)
Barbados	CBRTGS (Central Bank Real Time Gross Settlement System)
Bosnia and Herzegovina	RTGS
Belarus	BISS (Belarus Interbank Settlement System)
Bulgaria	RINGS (Real-time Interbank Gross Settlement)
Brazil	STR (Portuguese: Sistema de Transferência de Reservas; Reserves Transfer System)
Canada	Lynx
China	CIPS (Cross-Border Interbank Payment System)
Chile	LBTR/CAS (Spanish: Liquidación Bruta en Tiempo Real; Real-time Gross Settlement)
Costa Rica	TEF (Spanish: Transferencia Electrónica de Fondos; Electronic Funds Transfer)
Czech Republic	CERTIS (Czech Express Real Time Interbank Gross Settlement System)
Denmark	KRONOS2
Dominican Republic	LBTR (Spanish: Liquidación Bruta en Tiempo Real; Gross Settlement in Real Time)
Egypt	RTGS
Ethiopia	EATS (Ethiopian Automated Transfer System)
(European Union) Eurozone	T2
Fiji	FIJICLEAR
Hong Kong	CHATS (Clearing House Automated Transfer System)
Hungary	VIBER (Hungarian: Valós Idejű Bruttó Elszámolási Rendszer; Real-time Gross Settlement System)
Georgia	GPSS (Georgian Payment and Securities System)
India	RTGS
Indonesia	BI-RTGS (Bank Indonesia Real Time Gross Settlement Sistem)
Iran	SATNA (سامانه تسویه ناخالص آنی, Real-Time Gross Settlement System)
Iraq	RTGS (Real Time Gross Settlement System)
Israel	Zahav (Hebrew: זה"ב זיכויים והעברות בזמן אמת; Zahav Real-time Credits and Transfers)
Japan	BOJ-NET (Bank of Japan Financial Network System)
Jordan	RTGS-J
Kenya	KEPSS (Kenya Electronic Payment and Settlement System)
Korea	BOK-WIRE+ (The Bank of Korea Financial Wire Network, 한은금융망)
Kuwait	KASSIP (Kuwait's Automated Settlement System for Inter-Participant Payments)
Lebanon	BDL-RTGS (Banque Du Liban – Real Time Gross Settlement)
Macao	RTGS
Malawi	MITASS (Malawi Interbank Settlement System)
Malaysia	RENTAS (Real Time Electronic Transfer of Funds and Securities)
Mauritius	MACSS (Mauritius Automated Clearing and Settlement System)
Mexico	SPEI (Spanish: Sistema de Pagos Electrónicos Interbancarios; Interbank Electronic Payment System)
Morocco	SRBM (Système de règlement brut du Maroc; Moroccan Gross Settlement System)
Namibia	NISS (Namibia Interbank Settlement System)
New Zealand	ESAS (Exchange Settlement Account System)
Nigeria	CIFTS (CBN Inter-Bank Funds Transfer System)
North Macedonia	MIPS (Macedonian Interbank Payment System)
Pakistan	RTGS (Real Time Gross Settlement System)
Paraguay	LBTR (Spanish: Liquidación Bruta en Tiempo Real; Gross Settlement in Real Time)
Peru	LBTR (Spanish: Liquidación Bruta en Tiempo Real; Gross Settlement in Real Time)
Philippines	RTGS PS (Peso Real-Time Gross Settlement Payment System), also known as PhilPaSS^{plus}
Poland	SORBNET3
Qatar	QPS (Qatar Payment System)
Russia	BESP System (Banking Electronic Speed Payment System)
Romania	ReGIS
Saudi Arabia	SARIE (Saudi Arabian Riyal Interbank Express)
Singapore	MEPS+ (MAS Electronic Payment System Plus)
South Africa	SAMOS (The South African Multiple Option Settlement)
Sri Lanka	LankaSettle (RTGS/SSSS)
Sweden	RIX (Swedish: Riksbankens system för överföring av kontoförda pengar)
Switzerland	SIC (Swiss Interbank Clearing)
Taiwan	CIFS (CBC Interbank Funds Transfer System)
Tunisia	Système de Virements de Gros Montant Tunisien (SGMT)
Tanzania	TISS (Tanzania Interbank Settlement System)
Thailand	BAHTNET (Bank of Thailand Automated High Value Transfer Network)
Turkey	EFT (Electronic Fund Transfer)
Ukraine	SEP (System of Electronic Payments of the National Bank of Ukraine)
United Arab Emirates	UAEFTS (UAE Funds Transfer System)
United Kingdom	FPS (Faster Payments System) and CHAPS (Clearing House Automated Payment System)
United States	Fedwire
Uganda	UNIS (Uganda National Interbank Settlement)
Vietnam	IBPS
Zambia	ZIPSS (Zambian Interbank Payment and Settlement System)
Zimbabwe	ZETSS (Zimbabwe Electronic Transfer and Settlement System)

In 2010, the World Bank published a report on payment systems worldwide, which investigated these countries' usage of real-time gross settlement systems for large-value payments.

== See also ==
- Net settlement
- Automated clearing house
- Payment system
- SWIFT
