= Vocalink =

British payment systems company

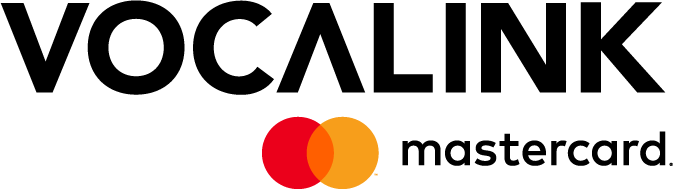
- Company type: Private
- Industry: Payments
- Predecessor: Voca Limited and LINK (UK)
- Founded: July 2, 2007
- Headquarters: London, United Kingdom
- Key people: Keith Douglas (CEO); Elizabeth Fullerton-Rome (Independent Chair)
- Owner: Barclays plc, Nationwide Building Society and Santander (2.7%); Mastercard (97.3%)
- Website: www.vocalink.com

Vocalink is a payment systems company headquartered in the United Kingdom, created in 2007 from the merger between Voca and LINK. It designs, builds and operates the UK payments infrastructure, which underpins the provision of the Bacs payment system and the UK ATM LINK switching platform covering 65,000 ATMs and the UK Faster Payments systems.

Vocalink processes over 90% of UK salaries, more than 70% of household bills and 98% of state benefits. In 2013 the company processed over 10.5 billion UK payments with a value of over £5 trillion. In July 2016 MasterCard purchased a 92% stake in the company, with the remainder to be held by UK banks for a period of three years.

== Background ==
In 1968, the Joint Stock Banks Clearing Committee chaired by Dennis Gladwell, set up the Inter-Bank Computer Bureau to modernise the existing paper-based standing order system. Secure electronic funds transfer between banks was introduced from later that year, significantly reducing both the processing time and human error associated with paper-based transactions, particularly bulk payments. In 1971 the company adopted the name "Bankers Automated Clearing Services Limited", soon shortened to Bacs, which was formally adopted as the company's name in 1985.

=== Cruickshank Report ===
In November 1998 HM Treasury commissioned a review of competition within the UK banking sector, to be chaired by Sir Don Cruickshank. Reporting in March 2000, The Cruickshank Report of competition within the UK banking sector recommended that:

- Clearance scheme ownership and management should be split from infrastructure operation and delivery
- Infrastructure management should be conducted on a commercial basis with fair and open access to third parties
- A need for a low-cost way to transfer money quickly

In response, on 1 December 2003, Bacs Payment Schemes Ltd (BPSL) was split from Bacs Limited. BPSL was established as a not for profit company with members from the banking industry, the purpose of which is to promote the use of automated payment schemes and govern the rules of the Bacs scheme. Bacs Limited owns the infrastructure to run the Bacs scheme. Bacs Limited was permitted to continue to use the Bacs name for one year, becoming Voca Limited on 12 October 2004.

=== LINK Interchange Network Ltd ===
LINK Interchange Network Ltd was formed in 1985 to create interoperability between ATMs across the United Kingdom. It became an international network in the 1990s through connection with the MasterCard and Visa networks. In October 2002 LINK launched the first service that used ATMs as a retail channel, enabling the facility to top-up a mobile phone at an ATM, bringing banking and mobile phones together for the consumer.

== Faster Payments Service ==
In 2005 a joint proposal from Voca and LINK was selected to deliver the payment-processing infrastructure for the Faster Payments Service, a near real-time interbank transfer for internet and telephone banking.

After Voca's bulk processing was brought together with LINK's real-time payment switching, the companies agreed to merge on 2 July 2007 to form VocaLink. Since its launch in 2008, over 3 billion real-time faster payment transactions have been processed by VocaLink.

== UK payments infrastructure ==
=== Bacs ===
Bacs provides two payment products to consumers:

- Bacs Direct Credits, payer-initiated interbank transfers. VocaLink processes 2 billion of these payments every year, including over 90% of all UK salaries and 98% of state benefits.
- Direct Debits, transfers initiated by authorised payees. Three-quarters of UK adults have at least one direct debit commitment; the average person has at least six.

VocaLink provides the underlying BacsTEL-IP infrastructure for Bacs, which processes over 5.6 billion of clearing and settlement of automated payments a year, with a value of £4.2 trillion.

=== LINK ===
VocaLink provides the switching infrastructure behind LINK, the busiest ATM switching system in the world which switches over 3.5 billion card-initiated transactions from 130 million enabled cards annually.

=== Faster Payments Service ===
VocaLink designed, built, and operates the infrastructure for the Faster Payments Service on behalf of the Faster Payments Scheme. Running in parallel with Bacs and CHAPS, launched in 2008 it enables interbank transfers in real-time. Since 2008, over three billion Faster Payments transactions have been securely processed by VocaLink.

== Mobile payments ==
=== Zapp ===
VocaLink has developed Zapp, a function that will reside within mobile banking apps to allow users to make real-time payments to retailers when shopping online or in-store. The service will be open to all financial institutions, merchants, acquirers, and consumers when it launches in 2015.

A Zapp payment works through secure digital 'tokens', which means that customers don't reveal any of their financial details to retailers. This also means that merchants do not need to store card details.

Zapp has been developed by VocaLink who operate the UK payments infrastructure. VocaLink processes over 90% of UK salaries, more than 70% of household bills and 98% of state benefits. In 2013 VocaLink processed over 10 billion transactions with a value of over £5 trillion.

Zapp is backed by four UK high street banks, meaning 18m consumer accounts are potentially Zapp-enabled: HSBC, Nationwide, Metro Bank, Santander.

== International payments infrastructure ==
On 12 July 2010 through EAPS, LINK opened all UK cash machines to the similar German Girocard scheme operated by Zentraler Kreditausschuss. Similarly the VocaLink agreement with the Pulse network allows Discover Card and Diners Club International cardholders to use LINK ATMs. VocaLink also provides a gateway service to Visa, MasterCard and China Union Pay.

Between 2007 and 2012, VocaLink operated a Single Euro Payments Area clearing and settlement mechanism, participating as a member of the European Automated Clearing House Association. The service was discontinued as a consequence of the low participation of VocaLink's shareholder UK banks into the platform.

In May 2008, VocaLink signed a deal with the Swedish Automated Clearing House Bankgirot, to outsource part of the Swedish payments system. This was the first time that the processing of a national payments scheme has been transferred to a non-domestic player.

In March 2014, in partnership with BCS Information Systems, VocaLink launched an immediate payments service, Fast And Secure Transfers (FAST) in Singapore, enabling fourteen Singaporean banks to offer the ability to transfer funds between bank accounts in real time.

== Mastercard acquisition ==
In July 2016, Mastercard announced that the company would be acquiring Vocalink. The acquisition was completed in May 2017 for a reported $920 million.

== See also ==
- Payments Council
- Bacs
- LINK
- Faster Payments
