= Payments UK =

- Predecessor: Payments Council
- Successor: UK Finance
- Formation: June 29, 2015
- Dissolved: July 2017
- Type: Trade association
- Legal status: Defunct
- Purpose: Representation of the UK payments industry
- Headquarters: London, England, United Kingdom
- Region served: United Kingdom
- Official language: English
- Website: paymentsuk.org.uk

Payments UK was a trade association representing financial institutions, technology firms, and payment processing companies in the United Kingdom.

It merged with a number of other British financial organisations in July 2017 to form UK Finance.

== History ==
On 29 June 2015, Payments UK was launched as the successor to the Payments Council. The regulatory powers of its predecessor were transferred to the Payment Systems Regulator; it acts primarily as an industry body.

In November 2015 it was confirmed that Payments UK would be merged with the British Bankers' Association, the Council of Mortgage Lenders, the UK Cards Association and the Asset Based Finance Association, following a review into financial trade bodies. The resulting organisation, UK Finance, began operating in July 2017.

== Governance ==
Payments UK was governed by a board of directors representing a cross section of its membership, including payment institutions, banks, technology firms and retailers.

The independent chairman of its board was Gerard Lemos CMG, and its chief executive was Maurice Cleaves. Lemos and Cleaves previously held the same positions in the Payments Council.

== See also ==
- Pay.UK
