= Pippa Heylings =

British politician (elected 2024)

Pippa Heylings MP
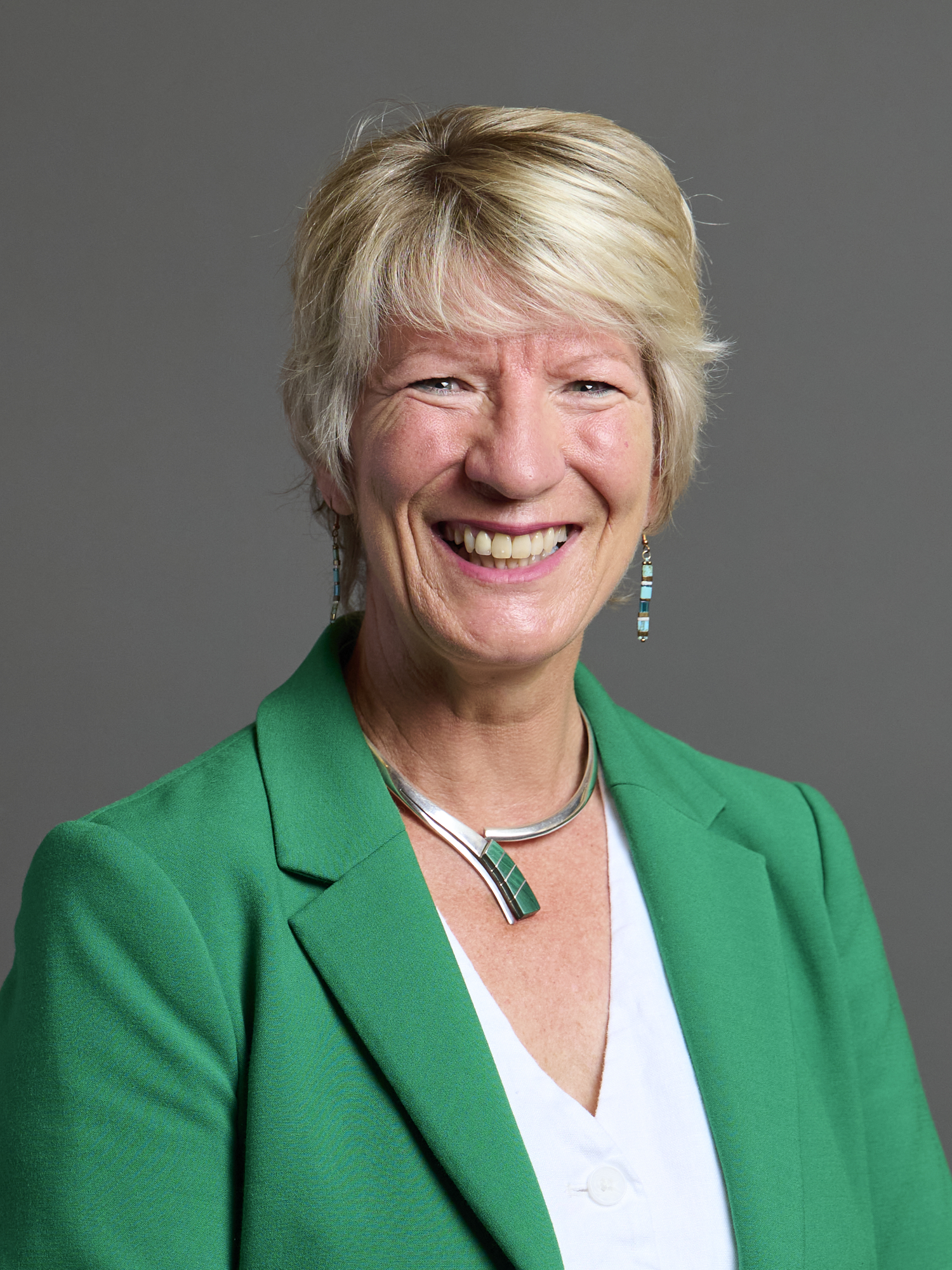
- Official portrait, 2024

Member of Parliament for South Cambridgeshire
- Incumbent
- Assumed office 4 July 2024
- Preceded by: Anthony Browne
- Majority: 10,641 (19.0%)

Liberal Democrat Spokesperson on Energy Security and Net Zero
- Incumbent
- Assumed office 18 September 2024
- Leader: Ed Davey
- Preceded by: Wera Hobhouse

Member of South Cambridgeshire District Council for Histon and Impington
- In office 8 May 2018 – 5 September 2024

Personal details
- Born: Phillippa Frances Heylings Kingston upon Hull, England
- Party: Liberal Democrats
- Education: Rhodes University

Phillippa Frances Heylings, known as Pippa Heylings, is a British politician who has served as Member of Parliament (MP) for South Cambridgeshire since 2024. A member of the Liberal Democrats, she previously represented Histon and Impington on the South Cambridgeshire District Council from 2018 to 2024.

== Early life ==
Heylings was born in Kingston upon Hull, her mother a nurse and her father a GP, and grew up with three brothers. In 1997, Heylings graduated from Rhodes University in South Africa with a master's degree in environmental education. She unsuccessfully contested the seat of South East Cambridgeshire in the 2019 general election.

== Parliamentary career ==
Heylings was elected as MP for South Cambridgeshire at the 2024 general election. She won 25,704 votes (46.8%), with a majority of 10,641 over the second-placed Conservative candidate. There were six candidates and a turnout of 71%. Following the 2023 Periodic Review of Westminster constituencies, the constituency's boundaries had changed, so that the 2024 seat was made up of parts of the previous South Cambridgeshire constituency (67.4% by area and 72.2% by population of the new seat), South East Cambridgeshire (31.9% by area and 18.8% by population) and Cambridge (0.7% by area and 9.0% by population). The notional 2019 result for the new seat was a narrow Conservative win over Liberal Democrat (43.5% to 41.0%), and Heylings's result in the new seat was described as a Liberal Democrat gain from the Conservatives.

She gave her maiden speech on 26 July 2024, and resigned her seat on the South Cambridgeshire District Council a few months later. She was later appointed as the Liberal Democrat spokesperson for energy security and net zero in September 2024.

In November 2024, Heylings voted in favour of the Terminally Ill Adults (End of Life) Bill, which proposes to legalise assisted suicide, citing her reasons on her website.

On 15 September 2025, she left the Environmental Audit Select Committee and was replaced by Roz Savage.

== Personal life ==
Heylings moved to Impington in the South Cambridgeshire District in 2012.

Parliament of the United Kingdom
Preceded by Anthony Browne	Member of Parliament for South Cambridgeshire; 2024–present	Incumbent
