= Standing order (banking) =

Instruction to a bank to pay a set amount at regular intervals

A standing order (or a standing instruction) is an instruction a bank account holder ("the payer") gives to their bank to pay a set amount at regular intervals to another's ("the payee's") account. The instruction is sometimes known as a banker's order.

They are typically used to pay rent, mortgage or any other fixed regular payments. Because the amounts paid are fixed, a standing order is not usually suitable for paying variable bills such as credit cards or gas and electricity bills.

Standing orders are available in the banking systems of a number of countries, including Germany, Bulgaria, the United Kingdom, Barbados, Ireland, India, Netherlands, Russia, Pakistan, Malaysia, Ukraine, Sri Lanka, Bangladesh and presumably many others. In the United States, and other countries where cheques are more popular than bank transfers, a similar service is available, in which the bank automatically mails a cheque to the specified payee. In Canada, the Interac network holds a monopoly on inter-bank transfers and has banned any type of automated (recurring or pre-scheduled) transfer between banks directly (though in practice this restriction does not apply to those with corporate accounts).

== Country differences ==
=== Canada ===
The Canadian inter-bank network, Interac, holds a monopoly on bank-to-bank transfers for individual customers in Canada. It has banned standing / banker's orders, along with direct debit and any type of recurring payments between bank accounts. Instead, it permits transfer of funds only via its own “Interac e-Transfer”, an electronic transfer system similar to a cheque, which may be sent manually to a recipient's email or phone number.

As of 2022, one Canadian bank (CIBC) has attempted to work within the system by facilitating automated (recurring or pre-scheduled) e-Transfers. It remains the only bank to attempt any degree of challenge to Interac's system. That said, exceptions are typically made for corporate clients, who are permitted to bypass the Interac scheme in exchange for substantially higher fees.

=== Germany ===
A standing order (Dauerauftrag) can run for a set number of payments, a set period of time, or until cancelled.

=== The Netherlands ===
Standing orders (periodieke overschrijvingen) are available for a set period of time or until cancelled, to any recipient in the SEPA. They should not be confused with doorlopende machtigingen (periodic direct debits).

=== Japan ===
A standing order (口座自動振替) runs until cancelled. They can be cancelled at the account holder's request.

=== New Zealand ===
Commonly known as "Automatic Payment" and can be set up via a bank teller at a branch of the bank, or via the internet banking service of most major banks.

=== South Korea ===
A standing order (납부자자동이체) runs until cancelled. They can be cancelled at the account holder's request. The bank charges fees (average 3000KRW) per transfer.

=== Spain ===
With most Spanish banks a standing order (transferencia periódica) can be set up to run for a set period of time, for a number of occurrences or indefinitely. They can be cancelled at any time at the account holder's request. There are typically no fees for such transactions.

=== Switzerland ===
In Switzerland standing orders are available for a set period of time or until cancelled. They can be made to any recipient in the SEPA space.

=== UK ===
A standing order can be set up to run for a set period of time, or indefinitely, and can be cancelled at the account holder's request. Standing orders are standardized by the trade body UK Payments Administration. In 2008 a number of banks began to introduce Faster Payments as the method of transfer for standing orders when available, in place of the slower BACS system; with this method payments reach the receiving account the same day, rather than after a delay of three days or more.

== Difference from direct debit ==
Standing orders are distinct from direct debits; both are methods of setting up repeated transfers of money from one account to another, but they operate in different ways. The fundamental difference is that standing orders send payments arranged by the payer, while direct debits are specified and collected by the payee.

- A standing order can be set up and modified only by the payer, and is for amounts specified by the payer to be paid at specified times (usually a fixed amount at a specified interval examples). The amount can be paid into any bank account, which need not belong to an organisation vetted by the payer's bank.
- A direct debit requires the payer authorize the payee take a direct debit for any amount at any time, or to instruct the bank to honour direct debit requests from a specified payee. The payee has full control over the payments. They can vary the amount and frequency of payments without further authorisation from the customer (subject to providing the customer with the required advance notice). The payer has no direct control over these payments, but can cancel the direct debit at any time, with no reason required, and require the return of disputed payments. It is not possible to authorise an individual to take direct debits; only organisations that have a contract with the payer's bank, or have been vetted by it, can do this.

== See also ==
- Overdraft
