= CHAPS =

British real-time payment system

Clearing House Automated Payment System
- Company type: Private
- Industry: Payment system
- Founded: February 1984
- Headquarters: London, United Kingdom
- Website: Website

The Clearing House Automated Payment System (CHAPS) is a real-time gross settlement payment system used for sterling transactions in the United Kingdom. It is mainly used by financial institutions to make wholesale financial payments and by large companies to make corporate treasury payments. In 2024, 52.7 million CHAPS payments were made, worth a total of £87.5 trillion. This made up just 0.1% of the total number of payments in that year, but was 88% of the total value of payments.

CHAPS was originally established in London by the Bankers Clearing House in February 1984, transferring to the CHAPS and Town Clearing Company Limited in December 1985. This company also operated the 'town clearing', where cheques cleared the same day between the 'town' bank branches in central London. Town clearing had been the forerunner of the CHAPS system, and was finally closed in 1995.

With the closure of the town clearing, the operating company was renamed to CHAPS Clearing Company Limited (informally CHAPS Co). Responsibility for the CHAPS system transferred from it to the Bank of England in November 2017. On 20 August 2018, the first non-bank institution, ipagoo LLP, joined the CHAPS scheme.

== Description ==
A CHAPS transfer is initiated by the sender to move money to the recipient's account (at another banking institution), where the funds need to be available (cleared) the same working day. Unlike with a bank giro credit, no pre-printed slip specifying the details of the recipient is required. Unlike cheques, the transfer is performed in real time, removing the issue of float or the potential for payments to be purposely stopped by the sender or returned due to insufficient funds, even after they appear to have arrived in the destination account.

CHAPS is used by twenty direct participants, including the Bank of England, and over 4,500 indirect participants (who process transactions via agency arrangements with direct participants). In its first year of operation, average daily transactions numbered 7,000, with a total annual value of £5 billion. In 2004, twenty years later, average daily transactions numbered 130,000, with an annual value of £300 billion. In 2010 there were 32 million CHAPS transactions, totalling over £61 trillion, down from £73 trillion in 2008.

CHAPS used to offer euro fund transfers as a member of the EU-area settlement system TARGET, but this service closed on 16 May 2008. The total value of these in 2007 was £57 trillion.

As well as making transfers originated by banks themselves, CHAPS is frequently used by businesses for high-value payments to suppliers, by mortgage lenders issuing advances, and by solicitors and conveyancers on behalf of individuals buying houses.

== Costs and problems ==
CHAPS transfers are relatively expensive, with banks typically charging as much as £35 for a transfer. The cost of fast transfers and the low speed of free transfers (such as BACS) was a subject of controversy in the UK, until immediate transactions became available from the Faster Payments service.

Problems can arise from delays, such as when an exceptional workload at a bank results in the money being cleared too late in a working day to complete related transactions, or inadequate instructions, when a bank is not given sufficient information to know where to credit the money, or a human delay in operating the machines.

== Participants ==
As of July 2021 the CHAPS participants are:

- Banco Santander London branch
- Bank of America London branch
- Bank of China London branch
- Bank of England
- Bank of Scotland
- Barclays International
- Barclays UK
- BNP Paribas London branch
- Citibank London branch
- ClearBank Limited
- CLS Group International (an Edge Act Bank based in New York)
- Clydesdale Bank
- Danske Bank
- Deutsche Bank London branch
- Elavon Financial Services DAC UK branch
- Euroclear SA/NV Brussels Head Office
- Goldman Sachs London branch
- Handelsbanken plc (UK subsidiary of Svenska Handelsbanken AB)
- HSBC Bank (Europe) (part of the HSBC Group)
- HSBC UK
- ING Group Amsterdam Head Office
- JPMorgan Chase London branch
- LCH Limited
- Lloyds Bank
- National Westminster Bank
- Northern Trust London branch
- Royal Bank of Scotland
- Santander UK
- Société Générale (Paris Head Office)
- Standard Chartered Bank
- State Street Bank and Trust Company London branch
- The Bank of New York Mellon London branch
- The Co-operative Bank
- TSB Bank plc
- UBS London branch
- Virgin Money UK

CHAPS clearing information relating to UK banks may be found in the Industry Sorting Code Directory.

== See also ==
- Clearing House Interbank Payments System (CHIPS), the US equivalent of CHAPS.
