= British Bankers' Association =

Former trade association

- Abbreviation: BBA
- Merged into: UK Finance
- Formation: 1919
- Defunct: July 1, 2017; 9 years ago
- Legal status: Non-profit company
- Purpose: Banking in the UK
- Location(s): London, EC2; United Kingdom
- Region served: UK
- Members: 253 banks
- Website: www.bba.org.uk

The British Bankers' Association (BBA) was a trade association for the UK banking and financial services sector. From 1 July 2017, it was merged into UK Finance.

It represented members from a wide range of banking and financial services. The association lobbied for its members and gave its view on the legislative and regulatory system for banking in the UK.

== History ==
The BBA was founded in 1919 by the merger of two pre-existing bodies, the Central Association of Bankers (est. 1895 in London, 34 St Clements Lane) and the Association of English Country Bankers (est. 1874 and itself one of the Central Association's founders). Until 1972, the BBA was only open to British domestic, colonial and dominion banks. In 1972, it opened itself to all banks operating in the United Kingdom. In 1975 responsibility for money transmission services moved to Association for Payment Clearing Services (APACS) (which became UK Payments Administration (UKPA) in 2009). In 1991, the Committee of London Clearing Bankers (est. 1821), which in 1985 had been renamed the Committee of London and Scottish Bankers, was subsumed into the BBA.

== Role ==
The BBA described itself as the leading trade association for the UK banking sector with more than 230 member banks headquartered in over 50 countries with operations in 180 jurisdictions worldwide.

== Structure ==
The BBA was a trade association owned and governed by its members.

=== BBA board ===
The board was the governing body of the Association. It agreed major strategies and policies.

=== Member segment advisory boards ===
Member segment advisory boards provided a forum to inform the agenda of the BBA board and policy committees. There was a member segment advisory board for the major retail banks, challenger banks, small banks, major international wholesale banks, foreign banks, private banks and wealth management, and custody banking.

=== High-level committees ===
The BBA had four high-level committees, representing retail policy, financial policy and risk, wholesale policy, and corporate policy.

=== Technical panels and working groups ===
Below its board, member segment advisory boards and high-level committees, the BBA had a number of technical panels and working parties.

== Activity ==
The BBA responded to the full range of issues affecting retail and wholesale banking and the wider financial services industry. As well as its interaction with current affairs, it worked to form and reform lasting policy decisions.

=== Products and services ===
==== BBA LIBOR ====
LIBOR (the London Interbank Offered Rate) was the primary benchmark for short-term interest rates. It indicates the average rate at which a leading bank can obtain unsecured funding for a given period in a given currency. It, therefore, represents the lowest real-world cost of unsecured funding in the London market. As such, LIBOR was one of the fundamental standards for global financial markets.

Prior to September, 2012, BBA LIBOR was calculated and published by Thomson Reuters on behalf of the BBA. In July 2012, it came out that LIBOR had been systematically rigged by Barclays for many years, leading to the LIBOR scandal. Paul Tucker, Deputy Governor of the Bank of England, compared the BBA LIBOR market to a "cesspit" of dishonesty. In September, 2012, it was decided that the BBA would be stripped of its role in LIBOR rate setting. Martin Wheatley said "the BBA acts as the lobby organisation for the same submitting banks that they nominally oversee, creating a conflict of interest that precludes strong and credible governance".

==== Events and training ====
In 2014 the BBA held 67 events attracting over 4,500 attendees. This included the association's annual conference and annual industry dinners, as well as a number of forums, briefings and training courses.

==== High street banking statistics ====
The BBA produced a monthly report on High Street banking figures which is used by banks and by the media. This data informed the BBA Annual Abstract of Banking Statistics which was published each August.

==== Global Operational Loss Database (GOLD) ====
The BBA managed the Global Operational Loss Database (GOLD) for its members. GOLD is an important tool for managing operational risk.

==== SME support ====
In line with the UK government's drive to support UK business, the BBA was a committed participant in the Business Growth Fund.

The BBA was leading efforts to increase funding to small and medium-sized enterprises through the Better Business Finance campaign. The BBA collaborated with the British Chambers of Commerce to deliver 15 outreach events across the UK throughout 2011 in support of this initiative.

Better Business Finance is complemented by the website Mentorsme, an online gateway through which small and medium businesses can connect with mentoring organisations and individuals working in their area.

==== Lost accounts ====
The BBA had responsibility for a number of personal and business customer services. These included the website My Lost Account, a free service that helps customers trace their lost accounts and savings.

==== BBA Strategy 2013-2015 ====
The BBA's three core priorities were helping customers, promoting growth and raising standards. Its strategy document gives further details about the Association's aims and values.

==== BBA Brief ====
The BBA Brief was a daily two-minute summary of the banking news that mattered sent at 10am.

== Organisation ==
Anthony Browne succeeded Angela Knight as chief executive on 1 September 2012. In April 2017, he announced he was stepping down after five years as CEO, when the BBA merged with five other trade associations to form UK Finance.

=== Senior personnel ===
- Anthony Browne, Chief Executive (2012–2017)
- Henrietta Royle, Chief Operating Officer
- Eric Leenders, Managing Director – Retail and Commercial Banking
- Ronald Kent, Managing Director – Wholesale and Financial Policy
- Pendar Ostovar, Executive Director – Strategy and Research
- Paul Chisnall, Executive Director – Financial Policy and Operations
- Simon Hills, Executive Director – Prudential Capital, Risk and Regulatory Relationships
- Mike Conroy, Executive Director – Business Finance
- Rebecca Park, Executive Director – External Affairs

=== Presidents ===
- 1972–73 E.O. Faulkner (Later Sir Eric Faulkner)
- 1973–80 Lord O'Brien of Lothbury
- 1980–84 Sir Eric Faulkner
- 1984–91 Sir Jeremy Morse
- 1991–96 Sir Nicholas Goodison
- 1996–97 Sir Brian Pitman
- 1997–2002 Andrew R.F. Buxton CMG
- 2002–04 Sir George Mathewson CBE, LLD, FRSE
- 2004–06 Sir Peter Middleton GCB

=== Chairmen ===
- 2006–10 Stephen Green
- 2010–12 Marcus Agius
- 2012–15 Nigel Wicks
- 2015–present Noreen Doyle

== See also ==
- Banking Code
- Banking in the United Kingdom
- British Banking School
- Euro Banking Association
- History of banking in the United Kingdom
- Libor Scandal
