= UK Finance =

UK trade association

- Predecessor: British Bankers' Association, Payments UK, the Council of Mortgage Lenders, the UK Cards Association and the Asset Based Finance Association
- Formation: July 1, 2017; 9 years ago
- Legal status: Non-profit company
- Purpose: Trade Association
- Location: 5th Floor, 1 Angel Court, London, United Kingdom
- Region served: United Kingdom
- Members: 300 financial services firms
- Chief Executive: David Postings
- Staff: 200 (2017)
- Website: www.ukfinance.org.uk

UK Finance is a British trade association for the UK banking and financial services sector formed on 1 July 2017, taking over most of the activities previously carried out by several separate industry bodies. It represents over 300 firms in the UK providing credit, banking, markets and payment-related services.

The association formulates policy for its members, advocates those policies with the Government of the United Kingdom, regulators and the media, and supports industry collaboration in the interests of efficiency and better customer outcomes.

== History ==
The association was created as a result of a merger of the British Bankers' Association, Payments UK, the Council of Mortgage Lenders, the UK Cards Association and the Asset Based Finance Association in July 2017. Its founding Chairman was Bob Wigley.

== See also ==
- TheCityUK
