= Direct debit =

Financial transaction with withdrawal from another's bank account

A direct debit or direct withdrawal is a mandated financial transaction whereby a payer authorizes a payee to draw varying recurring amounts directly from the payer's bank account, commonly used for billing utilities, loans, and subscriptions. Formally, the organisation that calls for the funds ("the payee") instructs their bank to collect (i.e., debit) an amount directly from another's ("the payer's") bank account designated by the payer and pay those funds into a bank account designated by the payee. Before the payer's banker will allow the transaction to take place, the payer must have advised the bank that they have authorized the payee to directly draw the funds. It is also called pre-authorized debit (PAD) or pre-authorized payment (PAP). After the authorities are set up, the direct debit transactions are usually processed electronically.

Direct debits are typically used for recurring payments, such as credit card and utility bills, where the payment amounts vary from one payment to another. However, when the authorization is in place, the circumstances in which the funds are drawn as well as the dates and amounts are a matter of agreement between the payee and payer, with which the bankers are not concerned.

In countries where setting up authorization is easy enough, direct debits can also be used for irregular payments, such as for mail order transactions or at a point of sale. The payer can cancel the authorization for a direct debit at any time, and the banker can decline to carry out a debit if the transaction would breach the terms of the bank account out of which payment is to be made, for example if it were to cause the account to overdraw. (Banking law does not authorize a bank to alter the payment amount.)

A direct debit instruction differs from a direct deposit and standing order instruction, which are initiated by the payer. A standing order involves fixed payment amounts paid periodically, while a direct debit can be of any amount and can be casual or periodic. They also should not be confused with a continuous payment authority, where the payee collects money whenever it feels it is owed.

Direct debits are available in a number of countries, including the United Kingdom, Brazil, Germany, Italy, Netherlands, South Africa, Spain, Sweden and Switzerland. Direct debits are made under each country's rules, and are usually restricted to domestic transactions in those countries. An exception in this respect is the Single Euro Payments Area (SEPA) which allows for Euro-denominated cross-border (and domestic) direct debits since November 2010. In the United States, direct debits are processed through the Automated Clearing House network.

== Origins ==
Alastair Hanton, a British banker and maths graduate, found that traditional banking methods of paying in cheques were incredibly costly. His answer was to gain permission from customers to take payment directly from their bank account. After six years of campaigning, the high-street banks finally agreed in 1964. By the end of the decade, the savings made using this method meant that direct debit had come into general use in the UK.

== Authorization ==
A direct debit instruction must in all cases be supported by some sort of authorization for the payee to collect funds from the payer's account. There are generally two methods to set up the authorization:

One method involves only the payer and the payee, with the payer authorizing the payee to collect amounts due on their account. However, the payer can instruct their bank to return any direct debit note without giving a reason. In that event, the payee has to pay all fees for the transaction and may eventually lose their ability to initiate direct debits if this occurs too often. However, it still requires all the account holders (not merely the payer) to watch statements and request returns if necessary, unless they have instructed their bank to block all direct debits.

The other method requires the payer to instruct their bank to honour direct debit notes from the payee. The payee is then notified that he or she is now authorised to initiate direct debit transfers from the payer. While this is more secure in theory, it can also mean for the payer that it is harder to return debit notes in the case of an error or dispute.

== Fees ==
In all countries, fees for direct debits are much lower than for credit cards. Credit cards charge a percentage of the transaction (2.5% to 3%) and sometimes a per-transaction fee (about $0.25). In contrast, direct debit fees are $0.15 to $0.20 per transaction on the U.S.'s Automated Clearing House (ACH) network, and £0.20 to £0.40 per transaction on the U.K.'s New Payment System Operator (NPSO) network. Fees vary between providers. Some offer flat rates while others have additional charges and monthly or yearly fees.

== Direct debit in different countries ==
The term direct debit and its implementation can vary by country and banking framework. While the underlying concept, authorising a third party to withdraw funds from a bank account, is generally consistent, the terminology, legal mandates, and scheme operators differ across jurisdictions:

=== Europe ===
In Europe, the SEPA Direct Debit (SDD) and SEPA Credit Transfer are the standardised payment schemes used for euro-denominated transactions within the Single Euro Payments Area (SEPA) country for payments within the Eurozone.

These schemes are available across all SEPA member countries for cross-border and domestic payments in euros.

Initially, SEPA Direct Debit operated in parallel with national direct debit systems. However, as of 1 August 2014, SDD became the exclusive method for collecting euro-denominated payments within the EU, effectively replacing legacy domestic schemes.

From October 2016, the use of SEPA Direct Debit and the International Bank Account Number (IBAN) became mandatory for all euro transfers within the EU and European Economic Area (EEA). This requirement does not apply to payments in other currencies, which may still use local or alternative systems.

=== United Kingdom ===
Direct Debit is a payment method for recurring payments in the UK. It is the third most popular payment method in the UK, after cash and debit card, according to Payments UK. Bacs Payment Schemes Limited is the organisation with responsibility for the Direct Debit scheme.

Direct Debit was invented by Alastair Hanton while he was working at Unilever as a way of collecting payments more efficiently. It commenced operation, as a paper-based system, in 1964.

Direct Debit accounts for the payment of 73% of household bills and almost nine out of ten British adults have at least one Direct Debit commitment. In 2015 nearly 3.9 billion Direct Debits were processed, representing a year-on-year increase of 239 million which surpasses the previous record for annual growth of 161 million, set in 2004. 4.07 billion Direct Debits were processed in 2016, an increase of 4.9% from 2015. Payments UK predicted the figure is expected to rise to 4.4 billion by 2026.

==== Authorisation ====
To set up payments by Direct Debit, the payer must complete a Direct Debit Instruction to the merchant. This instruction contains bank-approved wording that makes it clear the payer is setting up an ongoing authority for the merchant to debit their account. The interface for completing the Direct Debit Instruction is controlled by the merchant, who then sends the data from the form to the customer's bank, via Bacs.

The UK Direct Debit scheme rules allow for Direct Debit Instructions to be completed in several ways:

- paper-based forms, which require a signature
- over the telephone using a formal script to collect all the required information
- online, using an online application form which has been approved by a bank
- through other interactive services, where the interface has been approved by a bank

==== Guarantee ====
All UK payments collected by Direct Debit are covered by the Direct Debit Guarantee, which is provided by the UK's banks and building societies.

Under the guarantee a payer is entitled to a full and immediate refund in the event of an error in the payment of a Direct Debit from their account. Where an error has occurred, refunds are paid immediately by the payer's bank, who will then attempt to recover the money from the merchant's bank, who in turn will attempt to recover the money charged back from the merchant.

Under the Direct Debit scheme rules, merchants have very few grounds to challenge a charge-back generated under the Direct Debit Guarantee. Instead, they can pursue any payments which they believe have been incorrectly refunded to the payer directly through the small claims court.

==== Access ====
Before a company or organisation can collect payment by Direct Debit they need to be approved by a bank, or use a commercial bureau to collect direct debit payments on their behalf. This approval process ensures the company will be able to operate within the direct debit scheme rules and maintain the integrity of the scheme.

If a large number of customers complain about direct debits set up by a particular service user then the service user may lose its ability to set up direct debits.

==== Dormancy ====
Any direct debit instruction that has not been used to collect funds for over 13 months is automatically cancelled by the customer's bank (this is known as a "dormancy period", and was extended to 24 months during the Covid-19 pandemic). This can cause problems when the mandate is used infrequently, for instance, taking a payment to settle the bill for a seldom-used credit card. If the credit card company has not collected a payment using the Direct Debit mandate for over 13 months the mandate may have been cancelled as dormant without the customer's knowledge, and the direct debit claim will fail.

==== Fraud ====
The problem of direct debit fraud is extensive according to research by Liverpool Victoria Insurance which reveals that over 97,000 Britons have fallen victim to criminals setting up fraudulent direct debits from their accounts. An average of £540 goes missing before the customer notices. Direct debit payment fraud in 2010 accounted for around 10.6% of all identity fraud cases. The extent of direct debit scamming is set to grow to 41,000 cases a year by 2013, equating to a 57% rise.

However, the problem is exacerbated by some of the banks themselves for failing to implement any controls which prevent companies or fraudsters taking money from business and consumer accounts. The problem of cancelled and obsolete direct debits being wrongfully revived or re-implemented is estimated to cost UK consumers £385 million in 2010. For those customers who find out, it takes them on average four months to notice. Although no specific figures were collected it appears a substantial number of people lose considerable amounts of money annually because the obsolete direct debit is neither noticed nor recovered.

On 7 January 2008, Jeremy Clarkson found himself the subject of direct debit fraud after publishing his bank account and sort code details in his column in The Sun to make the point that public concern over the 2007 UK child benefit data scandal was unnecessary. He wrote, "All you'll be able to do with them is put money into my account. Not take it out. Honestly, I've never known such a palaver about nothing". Someone then used these details to set up a £500 direct debit to the charity Diabetes UK. In his next Sunday Times column, Clarkson wrote, "I was wrong and I have been punished for my mistake."

==== Training ====
Businesses and organisations collecting payments through Direct Debit are instructed by Bacs to take mandatory training. Whether businesses are collecting independently or through a bureau, their relevant staff need to understand the fundamentals of the payment method. Courses are available through Bacs or through accredited external training. There are only four recognised companies in the UK providing Bacs accredited training: Accountis (D+H), Bottomline Technologies, Clear Direct Debit and allpay.

=== Canada ===
In Canada, direct debit payments are often referred to as Pre-Authorized Debits (PADs). PADs work over a computerized network through Payment Canada's federally-secured Automated Clearing Settlement System (ACSS). This network connects all of Canada's financial institutions.

=== Germany ===
In Germany, banks generally have been providing direct debit (elektronisches Lastschriftverfahren (ELV), "Lastschrift", Bankeinzug) using both methods since the advent of so-called Giro accounts in the 1950s.

The Einzugsermächtigung ("direct debit authorisation") just requires the customer to authorize the payee to make the collection. This can happen in written form, orally, by e-mail or through a web interface set up by the payee. Although organisations are generally required not to instruct their banks to make unauthorised collections, this is usually not verified by the banks involved. Customers can instruct their bank to return the debit note within at least six weeks.

This method is very popular within Germany as it allows quick and easy payments, and it is suited even for one-time payments. A customer might just give the authorisation at the same time she or he orders goods or services from an organisation. Compared to payments by credit cards, which allow similar usage, bank fees for successful collections are much lower. Often retailers such as supermarkets will process Girocards as direct debit (ELV) transactions after performing a real-time risk analysis when the card is swiped. This is possible because the bank account number and routing code of the giro account form part of every Girocard's card number (PAN), similar to early 1990s 19 digit Switch card numbers. The customer agrees to the direct debit by signing the back of the receipt, which normally contains a long contractual text that also allows the retailer to contact the customer's bank and get their address in the case the debit is returned ("Rücklastschrift"). Direct debits are practically free for the retailer, allowing them to save the Girocard interchange fees (approx. 0.3%) that would be associated with PIN based transactions, but incur a higher risk as the payment can be returned for any reason for up to 45 days. Therefore, they are used usually for returning customers that have already had successful Girocard (PIN-verified) transactions at the same store or are purchasing low-risk or small-ticket items.

To prevent abuse, account holders must watch their bank statements and ask their bank to return unauthorised (or wrong) debit notes. As fraudulent direct debit instructions are easily traced, abuse is rare. However, there can be issues when the amount billed and collected is incorrect or unexpectedly large. There have also been cases of fraudulent direct debit where the defrauders tried to collect very small individual sums from large numbers of accounts, in the hope that most account holders would be slow to raise an issue about such small sums, giving the defrauders enough time to withdraw the collected money and disappear.

The Abbuchungsauftrag ("posting off") requires the customer to instruct their bank to honour debit notes from the organisation. Direct debits made with this method are verified by the customer's bank and therefore can not be returned. As it is less convenient, it is rarely used, usually only in business-to-business relationships.

=== Netherlands ===
In the Netherlands, as in Germany, an account holder can authorize a company to collect direct debit payments, without notifying the bank. This process is very common, with as many as 45% of all banking transactions conducted via direct debit.

A transaction can be ongoing, or one time only. For both types collecting organizations must enter into a direct debit (automatische incasso) contract with their bank. For each transaction the name and account number of the account holder must be provided. The collecting organisation can then collect from any account, provided there is enough money in the account and no block is set against direct debit from the collecting organisation.

Transactions can be contested, depending on the type of transaction, time since the transaction and the basis of dispute. Authorized transactions of the ongoing type can be recalled directly via the bank of the account holder within the 56 days (8 weeks) since the transaction, with the exception of transactions relating to games of chance and perishables. Authorized one-time only transactions can be recalled via the bank within 5 days. Unauthorized transactions can be contested via the bank within a limited time period after the transaction.

Another security measure is a "selective block" whereby the customer can instruct the bank to disallow direct debits to a specified account number. Blanket blocks are also available.

=== Poland ===
In Poland, direct debit is operated by KIR (Krajowa Izba Rozliczeniowa) and participating banks as one of the functionalities of the Elixir clearing system. The payer has to authorize the payee by filling, signing and submitting a standardized paper form in two copies. One copy, after filling in payee details and a customer identification number, is sent by the payee to the payer's bank, which verifies the signature. From now on, the payee may debit the payer's account. Since 24 Oct 2012 it is also possible to submit such authorization through the payer's bank, often also online.

The payer can:

- Cancel any direct debit transaction:
  - within 56 calendar days - individuals,
  - within 5 working days - businesses and other organizations.
- Suspend authorization so future direct debit transactions are blocked.
- Revoke authorization at any time either online or by submitting a paper form to the bank.

In case of cancelling a transaction, funds are immediately returned to the payer's account. Interest is also adjusted as if the transaction never happened.

Collecting fees through direct debit is supported mostly by companies such as telecom, insurance and utility companies and banks themselves but it is not widely used by consumers because of the bureaucracy involved in setting direct debits up.

=== Ireland ===
The direct debit system in Ireland was previously operated by the Irish Payment Services Organisation (IPSO) until its integration with the Irish Banking Federation (IBF) in 2014, forming the Banking and Payments Federation Ireland (BPFI).

Direct debit instructions can be given in writing, by telephone or online. There are protections for the holder of the account being debited in the event of a dispute. The Irish payment system was replaced by the SEPA Direct Debit Core Scheme (SDD) following the conversion of all legacy credit transfer and direct debit systems to the Eurozone-wide SEPA system on 1 February 2014.

=== Denmark ===
Direct debit is preferred payment method for recurring household payments in Denmark. The service, launched back in the early seventies, is called "Betalingsservice" and is used by about 96% of the Danish households.

=== Japan ===
Direct debit is a very common payment option in Japan. When signing up for a service, such as telephone, a customer is usually asked to enter their bank details on the service submission form, to set up for automatic payments, and the company they are signing up to will take care of the rest. Sometimes, but not always, the customer is offered the possibility to enter credit card details instead of bank account details, to have the money directly debited from credit card instead of bank account. Direct debit is also an option for paying utility bills, alongside bank transfers and credit card payments.

=== Malaysia ===
In Malaysia, the direct debit system is available via the product known as FPX – Financial Process Exchange. FPX supports online direct debit as well as batch direct debit.

Supported by Bank Negara Malaysia and the local financial institutions, FPX is operated by FPX Payment Gateway Sdn Bhd, a subsidiary company of Malaysian Electronic Payment System (1997) Sdn Bhd (MEPS).

=== Nigeria ===
Direct debit in Nigeria, is powered principally by the Nigerian Interbank Settlement System (NIBSS) and Remita Payment Services Limited.

NIBSS, which is the Nigerian Central Switch, is directly integrated to all banks in Nigeria but supports direct debit only on the major commercial bank payments route. NIBSS direct debit supports paper-based mandate authorization which is manually approved by the banks. They have subsequently launched API based direct debit payments which is being driven by some of the authorized payments providers (Paystack, Mono, etc.) and lending-as-a-service platforms (Lendsqr).

Remita direct debit is paper based and requires that the payer or the merchant takes the mandate to their banks for processing. Remita is also integrated into some of the largest commercial banks for direct debit services.

The Central Bank of Nigeria requires that every licensed bank and fintech provides direct debit services and are required to do this using the NIBSS payments rail.

=== Australia ===
In Australia, direct debit is performed through the direct entry system also known as BECS (Bulk Electronic Clearing System) or CS2, managed by the Australian Payments Network Limited. An account holder can authorise a company to collect direct debit payments, without notifying the bank, but direct debit is not available on all financial accounts.

A common example of direct debit is authorising a credit card company to debit a bank account for the monthly balance.

Many smaller companies do not have direct debit facilities themselves, and a third-party payment service must be used to interface between the biller and the customer's bank. For this a small charge (typically $1–2 per transaction, incorporated into the bill amount) is made by the payment service.

Direct credit and debit instructions are only available to institutional customers. Direct credit instructions are used for payrolls and other large scale regular payments. Direct debit instructions are used by insurance companies, utilities and other large organisations which receive regular payments. Although governed by APCA rules, the actual exchanges of instructions occur through bilateral exchanges. There is no central "clearinghouse" for bulk direct entry payment instructions.

=== United States ===
In the United States, direct debit usually means an Automated Clearing House (ACH) transfer from a bank account to a biller, initiated by the biller.

=== South Africa ===
In South Africa direct debits, also known as debit orders, are performed through the ACB (Automated Clearing Bureau). An account holder can authorise a company to collect direct debit payments. The client signs a debit mandate form giving the requesting company permission to debit their account with a fixed or variable monthly value. This value can be recurring or once-off. This is an effective, safe and more cost effective alternative to receiving money in cash, by cheque or EFT (Electronic Funds Transfer).

There are three types of commonly used debit orders in South Africa: EFT (Electronic Funds Transfer), NAEDO (Non-authenticated Early Debit Order) and AEDO (Authenticated Early Debit Order).

A new payment stream introduced by the South African Reserve Bank in 2017, called AC or Authenticated Collections replaced the previous NAEDO payment stream with the purpose to reduce customer disputes and abuse of the debit order system. The AC payment stream is known to consumers as DebiCheck.

=== Sweden ===
In Sweden, direct debit is available, called Autogiro. The amount is withdrawn from the payer's account on the payee's request without specification. The approval is done once without time limit for each payer/payee combination, but can be withdrawn at any time. The request is normally sent through a form from the payer to the payee, but in the internet bank it is also possible to request it. Autogiro should not be confused with the electronic billing system E-faktura although some banks let the payer instruct the bank to automatically pay received electronic bills on their due date without the customer having to log in to the internet bank and authorize the payment.

=== Switzerland ===
Switzerland has a form of direct debit called Lastschriftverfahren (LSV) der Banken.

The setup of a direct debit is by signed authority to the bank. Depending on the proposition of the bank, the direct debit is claimed and may or may not require authorisation. Some banks allow a limit to be put in place for automatic approval.

=== Turkey ===
In Turkey, direct debits are widely used, for utility and credit card payments, as well as commercial transactions. However, whereas in other countries the payee instructs his/her bank to make a collection, in Turkey the payer needs to authorise his/her bank directly. The usage differs from standing orders, as payment amounts are not fixed and payments need not be periodical (i.e. payments can be of any amount and can be casual or periodic).

=== Brazil ===
Authorized Direct Debit (DDA) is a system in Brazil created by Febraban (Brazilian Federation of Banks) and associated Brazilian banks that replaces the issuance of printed payment slips with the electronic collection of obligations. It was implemented on October 10, 2009.

== See also ==
- Direct deposit
- Standing order
