= Payment system =

System used to settle financial transactions through the transfer of monetary value

A payment system is any system used to settle financial transactions through the transfer of monetary value. This includes the institutions, payment instruments such as payment cards, people, rules, procedures, standards, and technologies that make its exchange possible. A payment system is an operational network which links bank accounts and provides for monetary exchange using bank deposits. Some payment systems also include credit mechanisms, which are essentially a different aspect of payment.

Payment systems are used in lieu of tendering cash in domestic and international transactions. This consists of a major service provided by banks and other financial institutions. Traditional payment systems include negotiable instruments such as drafts (e.g., cheques) and documentary credits such as letters of credit. With the advent of computers and electronic communications, many alternative electronic payment systems have emerged. The term electronic payment refers to a payment made from one bank account to another using electronic methods and forgoing the direct intervention of bank employees. Narrowly defined electronic payment refers to e-commerce—a payment for buying and selling goods or services offered through the Internet, or broadly to any type of electronic funds transfer.

Modern payment systems use cash-substitutes as compared to traditional payment systems. This includes debit cards, credit cards, electronic funds transfers, direct credits, direct debits, internet banking, e-commerce payment systems and Buy now, pay later (BNPL).

Payment systems may be physical or electronic and each has its own procedures and protocols. Standardization has allowed some of these systems and networks to grow to a global scale, but there are still many country-specific and product-specific systems. Examples of payment systems that have become globally available are credit card and automated teller machine (ATM) networks. Additionally, forms exist to transfer funds between financial institutions. Domestically this is accomplished by using Automated clearing house (ACH) and real-time gross settlement (RTGS) systems. Internationally this is accomplished by correspondent banking (possibly using the SWIFT network) or a more centralised system like the CLS settlement system.

== Domestic ==
An efficient national payment system reduces the cost of exchanging goods, services, and assets. It is indispensable to the functioning of the interbank, money, and capital markets. A weak payment system may severely drag on the stability and developmental capacity of a national economy. Such failures can result in inefficient use of financial resources, inequitable risk-sharing among agents, actual losses for participants, and loss of confidence in the financial system and in the very use of money. The technical efficiency of the payment system is important for the development of the economy.

An automated clearing house (ACH) system processes transactions in batches, storing, and transmitting them in groups. An ACH is considered a net settlement system, which means settlement may be delayed. This poses what is known as settlement risk.

Real-time gross settlement systems (RTGS) are funds transfer systems where the transfer of money or securities takes place from one bank to another on a "real-time" and on "gross" basis. Settlement in "real time" means that payment transaction does not require any waiting period. The transactions are settled as soon as they are processed. "Gross settlement" means the transaction is settled on one to one basis without bunching or netting with any other transaction. Once processed, payments are final and irrevocable.

Comparatively, ACHs are typically used for low-value, non-urgent transactions while RTGS systems are typically used for high-value, urgent transactions.

Countries and regions have also implemented real-time or instant (or faster) payment systems which typically operate 24x7x365 and perform the transaction from debit of ordering customer's account to credit of beneficiary customer's account within a timeframe of 10–15 seconds.

== International ==
International payment systems operate like their domestic counterparts but have additional complexity as they need to navigate currency exchange and cross-border jurisdictional and financial environments. The key system used for international transfer has been the SWIFT network that is used by banks to transfer funds between countries. International transfers have traditionally been cumbersome, error prone and expensive. Increasing globalization has driving corporations and individuals to transact more frequently across borders. Transaction volume continue to increase with people buying from foreign eCommerce sites as well as traveling, living, and working abroad. For the payments industry, the result is higher volumes of payments—in terms of both currency value and number of transactions. This is also leading to a consequent shift downwards in the average value of these payments.

Payments systems set up decades ago might be retrofitted or force-fitted to meet modern business needs. Frequently, the systems become unstable or less reliable, for example, STEP2 (an upgrade from 2003), which processes only euros. This has led to new transfer services that use financial technology or cryptocurrency to make it easier, faster and cheaper to transfer funds internationally.

As of 2014, STEP2 is the only Pan-European automated clearing house (or PE-ACH system) in operation. This type of system is thought to become less relevant as banks will settle their transactions via multiple clearing houses rather than using one central clearing house.

T2 is a RTGS system that covers the European Union member states which use the euro. It is part of the Eurosystem, which comprises the European Central Bank and the national central banks of those countries that have adopted the euro. T2 is used for the settlement of central bank operations, large-value Euro interbank transfers as well as other euro payments. It provides real-time financial transfers, debt settlement at central banks which is immediate and irreversible.

For users of these systems, on both the paying and receiving sides, it can be difficult and time-consuming to learn how to use cross-border payment tools, and how to set up processes to make optimal use of them. Solution providers (both banks and non-banks) also face challenges cobbling together old systems to meet new demands. For these providers, cross-border payments are both lucrative (especially given foreign exchange conversion revenue) and rewarding, in terms of the overall financial relationship created with the end customer.

The challenges for global payments are not simply those resulting from volume increases. A number of economic, political, and technical factors are changing the types of cross-border transactions conducted. Such factors include:

- Companies are making more cross-border purchases of services (as opposed to goods), as well as more purchases of complex fabricated parts rather than simple, raw materials.
- Enterprises are purchasing from more countries, in more regions.
- Increased outsourcing is leading to new in-country and new cross-border intra-company transactions.
- More enterprises are participating in complex, automated supply chains, which in some cases drive automatic ordering and fulfillment. Online purchasing continues to grow, both by large enterprises as part of an automated procurement system and by smaller enterprises purchasing directly.
- There is continued growth in the number of cross-border commuters.
- Individuals are increasingly investing abroad.

== See also ==
- Automated clearing house
- Automated teller machine
- Clearing
- Credit card
- Debit card
- Direct deposit
- Digital currency
- E-commerce credit card payment system
- E-commerce payment system
- Electronic bill payment
- Digital wallet
- Electronic funds transfer
- Interbank network (ATM / EFT / EFTPOS )
- Online banking
- Payment card
- Payment service provider
- Payments as a service
- Payment orchestration platform
- Real-time gross settlement
- Wire transfer
