= Bacs =

Bank transfer system in the United Kingdom

- Founded: 1968; 58 years ago
- Owner: Pay.UK
- Website: www.bacs.co.uk
- Formerly called: Bankers' Automated Clearing Services

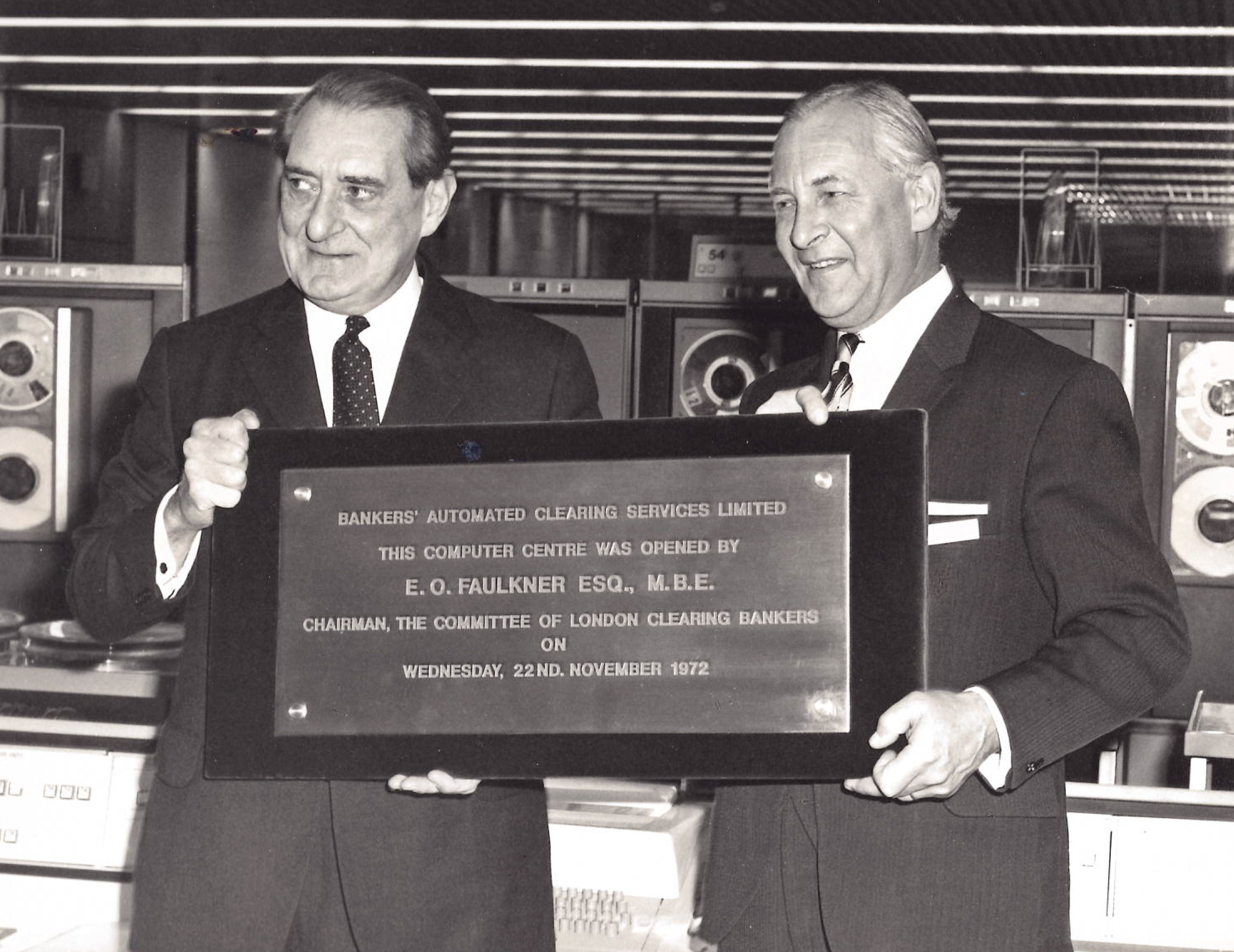
Official opening of BACS with Dennis Gladwell, Chairman of BACS (right)

Bacs Payment Schemes Limited (Bacs), previously known as Bankers' Automated Clearing System, is responsible for the clearing and settlement of UK automated direct debit and Bacs Direct Credit and the provision of third-party services. Bacs became a subsidiary of Pay.UK (formerly known as New Payment System Operator (NPSO)) on 1 May 2018, and responsibility for direct debit, Bacs Direct Credit, the Current Account Switch Service, Cash ISA Transfer Service and the Industry Sort Code Directory was given to Pay.UK.

More than 140 billion transactions have been debited or credited to British bank accounts via Bacs since its inception; in 2019, 6.5 billion UK payments, worth £5 trillion, were made. At the end of November 2019, the number of single-day transactions processed by Bacs reached a high of 124 million; a monthly record was set in August 2018, when 580 million payments were processed.

== History ==
The Electronics Sub-Committee of the Committee of London Clearing Bankers was formed in the late 1950s to consider the automation of cheque-clearing. The committee set up a New Services Working Party in 1965 to examine the possibility of exchanging data between banks without using paper – specifically, the automated exchange of standing order credits. This led to the creation of the Inter-Bank Computer Bureau (IBCB) within the Bankers Clearing House, which was tasked with setting up a computer facility and led by Dennis Gladwell to steer the creation and development of what would become the Bankers Automated Clearing Services.

The electronic transfer of funds began in 1968 in BCH's (Bankers Clearing House) computer room. A new location was found in 1971: a converted warehouse in Edgware on a site used by Amy Johnson and Jim Mollison on their solo flights to Australia. Plans for a purpose-built computer centre were drawn up early that year. The building was completed in June 1972, with ICL equipment delivered in July. Full computer service was established after the relocation in October 1972. Dennis Gladwell officially opened the fully operational site alongside E. O. Faulkner on Wednesday, 22 November 1972.

The IBCB was initially controlled by BCH's Systems and Development Committee before it was controlled by its own managing committee. The committee decided that a separate limited company should be created, and Bankers Automated Clearing Services was registered on 10 September 1971. Adopting BACS as its name, the company registered the acronym as a trademark on 1 December 1971. It was renamed BACS Limited on 20 March 1986.

On 1 December 2003, Bacs Payment Schemes Limited (BPSL) was split from Bacs Limited as a nonprofit organisation with members of the banking industry promoting the use of (and setting the rules for) automated-payment schemes and Bacs Limited owning the infrastructure to operate them. Bacs Limited used that name for one year, becoming Voca Limited on 12 October 2004. Voca Limited merged with the UK national switch provider LINK Interchange Network on 2 July 2007, and became Vocalink. Vocalink owns the infrastructure on which payment schemes operate, and BPSL maintains the schemes.

Bacs users began moving from the telephone dial-up BACSTEL service (introduced in 1983 to replace magnetic media) to BACSTEL-IP, a faster, more secure Internet-based service, in 2003. All Bacs users, including businesses that make payments to their suppliers or operate their staff payroll electronically, were required to move to BACSTEL-IP by the end of December 2005 or return to using cheques. When BACSTEL-IP was introduced, all software used to make a connection to Bacs required approval; it is only possible to connect with software from the list of Bacs Approved Solution Suppliers (BASS) or an approved bureau.

New service users were required to use AUDDIS, a more efficient system for organizations to send new direct-debit instructions to their customers' bank or building society electronically instead of on paper, in 2008. That year, annual direct-debit volume surpassed three billion; volume reached 3.5 billion by 2013, with 100 billion payments processed since 1968.

== Products and services ==
=== Direct debit ===
A direct debit is an instruction from a customer to a bank (or building society) to authorize a third party to collect an amount from an account, often for regular payments. Over 4.5 billion direct debits were processed in 2019.

=== Bacs Direct Credit ===
Bacs Direct Credit is a service which enables organizations of all sizes to make payments direct into a bank or building society account. There are more than 150,000 organizations in the UK using Bacs Direct Credit and it has been widely adopted to pay benefits, wages and salaries – nearly 90 per cent of the country's workforce is paid this way and one billion benefit payments are made via Bacs Direct Credit – it is also the payment method used for a range of other applications such as pension payments, employee expenses, insurance settlements, dividends and refunds.

=== Current Account Switch Service ===
Since its September 2013 introduction, more than six million UK current accounts have been switched; the service reported a seven-day switching success rate of 99.4 per cent. It offers consumers, small businesses, trusts and small charities a way of switching current accounts to increase competition and support the entry of new banks in the current-account marketplace. The service is offered by 49 banks and building societies.

When a current account is opened with a new bank or building society, the Current Account Switch Service will transfer the old-account activity to the new one: moving incoming and outgoing payments, transferring the account balance, and closing the old account. Although the process takes place over seven working days, the account is transferred on the final day; customers use the old account until the agreed switch day, and then use the new account with no loss of service. It is backed by the Current Account Switch Guarantee, which promises to reimburse account holders if they incur fees or charges as a result of the switchover.

=== Other services ===
The Cash ISA Transfer Service, introduced in October 2012, offers a quicker and easier transfer process while reducing paper flow and increasing efficiency. The Biller Update Service was introduced in June 2013.

== Further developments ==
Bacs processed a record 5.8 billion transactions in 2014 for a total of £4.4 trillion, including 3.6 billion direct debits. The number of payments passing through the Bacs system topped six billion for the first time the following year, with a value of £4.6 trillion. The number of direct debits processed in 2015 increased by 239 million over the 2014 total.

A record 103 million transactions were processed in a single July 2015 day. That year, it was announced that the number of payments handled by Bacs since 1968 had exceeded 110 billion.

In 2016, 6.22 billion transactions were processed with a value of £4.8 trillion; the number of direct-debit payments exceeded four billion. Daily processing records were set twice that year: 109.3 million payments on one day at the end of September, surpassing the April high of 103.7 million. A record 6.34 billion payments were processed in 2017, totalling £4.9 trillion.

At the end of November 2018, the number of daily transactions processed by Bacs reached a new high of 123 million; a monthly record of 580 million payments was set in August of that year. In January 2019, it was announced that Bacs had processed a record 6.4 billion UK payments, totalling just under £5 trillion, the previous year. Bacs processed 6.5 billion UK payments totalling £5 trillion in 2019, setting a single-day record of 124 million transactions at the end of November.

Bacs' scope has expanded to include third-party services (such as the Cash ISA Transfer Service) and the development, management and ownership of the Current Account Switch Service, which began in September 2013. The guaranteed service has reduced the time it takes for consumers, small businesses, and small charities to switch current accounts to seven working days, and has facilitated over six million switches. On 1 May 2018, Bacs became a wholly owned subsidiary of Pay.UK (formerly known as the New Payment System Operator).

== See also ==
- CHAPS – British real-time payment system
- EFTPOS – Type of payment system
- Payments UK
- SWIFT – Financial telecommunication network
- ToDDaSO – UK electronic payment service
