= Link (British interbank network) =

British interbank network

- Operating area: United Kingdom; Channel Islands; Isle of Man
- Members: 32
- ATMs: 47,711 (As of December 2023)
- Founded: 1985; 41 years ago
- Website: www.link.co.uk

Link (stylised as LINK) is the UK’s main ATM network, which allows consumers to withdraw cash from ATMs which do not belong to their bank. It is the largest interbank network in United Kingdom. It is a not-for profit organisation and is regulated by the Bank of England and Financial Conduct Authority.

== Network ==
Link is made up of 29 member organisations.These include high street banks (such as Barclays, HSBC, Lloyds Bank and NatWest) and building societies (such as Nationwide and the Coventry Building Society), the Post Office and independent ATM operators.

The network connects around 42,400 cash machines, meaning virtually every single cash machine in the United Kingdom is connected to Link.

At the end of 2025, there were about 33,700 free to use cash machines and 8,700 cash machines that charge for withdrawals. Typically, around £1.6billion is withdrawn from Link ATMs each week. The average withdrawal is around £82 and the average UK adult withdraws around £1,350. In the UK, around 90% of cash withdrawals are made from cash machines.

The Link network infrastructure is operated by Vocalink, a company formed in 2007 by the merger of Link Interchange Network Limited and Voca Limited. The Link cash machine scheme is a separate entity which is run by the scheme members.

The CEO is John Howells and the Chair is Tom Ilube CBE.

== Financial Inclusion ==
Link runs a financial inclusion programme to protect cash machines in some of the most remote and deprived areas of the UK. This was first designed and set up following work with the Treasury Select Committee under the chairmanship of Lord McFall in 2006 and has developed and expanded since Link has committed to protecting the geographic spread of ATM provision and it established the Link Consumer Council to provide advice on consumer issues related to cash.

Link’s financial inclusion programme works to subsidise the provision of free to use cash machines to ensure access to free to use ATMs in deprived areas. The subsidy is paid via an interchange premium of up to £2.75 from Link and is available to deprived areas that do not have a free ATM within a kilometre from the nearest free to use ATM. These subsidies cost around £1.5m each month.

Over 3,400 priority areas across the country have benefited from new free to use ATMs as a result of this initiative.

In October 2019, Link launched a scheme allowing any member of the public to request an ATM in their community. To date, more than 160 locations have benefited from a new free to use cash machine.

== Banking hubs ==
In 2021, following an agreement from the banking industry through the Access to Cash Action Group, any community facing the closure of a core cash service, such as a bank branch or ATM, has its needs independently assessed by Link. In this role, Link will then determine whether a new solution should be provided to meet that community's cash needs. Link will commission services to meet the cash needs of the community as a whole. This process is also open to communities that have historically lost existing cash services.

Banking hubs are delivered by Cash Access UK Ltd.

== See also ==
- ATM usage fees
- Euro Alliance of Payment Schemes
