= Pay.UK =

British service company

- Type: Non-profit limited company
- Industry: Financial services
- Predecessor: Association for Payment Clearing Services
- Founded: 6 July 2009; 17 years ago
- Headquarters: London, United Kingdom
- Area served: United Kingdom
- Services: Payment infrastructure in the United Kingdom
- Website: www.wearepay.uk

The Pay.UK (formerly UK Payments Administration) is a United Kingdom service company that provides people, facilities and expertise to the UK payments industry.

UKPA was created on 6 July 2009, as a successor of the Association for Payment Clearing Services (APACS) to support the systems behind UK payments, such as Bacs, CHAPS and the Cheque and Credit Clearing Company. APACS had been created in 1985 to oversee the majority of UK payment clearing systems and keep their operational efficiency and integrity in order.

== History ==
The organization was created to amalgamate the United Kingdom's domestic payment systems that had been operating separately for over 50 years. This included the Cheque and Credit Clearing Company, Bacs, cheque image clearing system, and Faster Payments.

Former UK prime minister Theresa May was a employee of APACS from 1985 to 1997.

In Sep 2017 the New Payment System Operator (NPSO) was established and in October that year the organisation was rebranded as Pay.UK.

In May 2018 Bacs and Faster Payments officially became subsidiaries of Pay.UK.
