= Bank account =

Financial account maintained by a bank

Account at financial institution

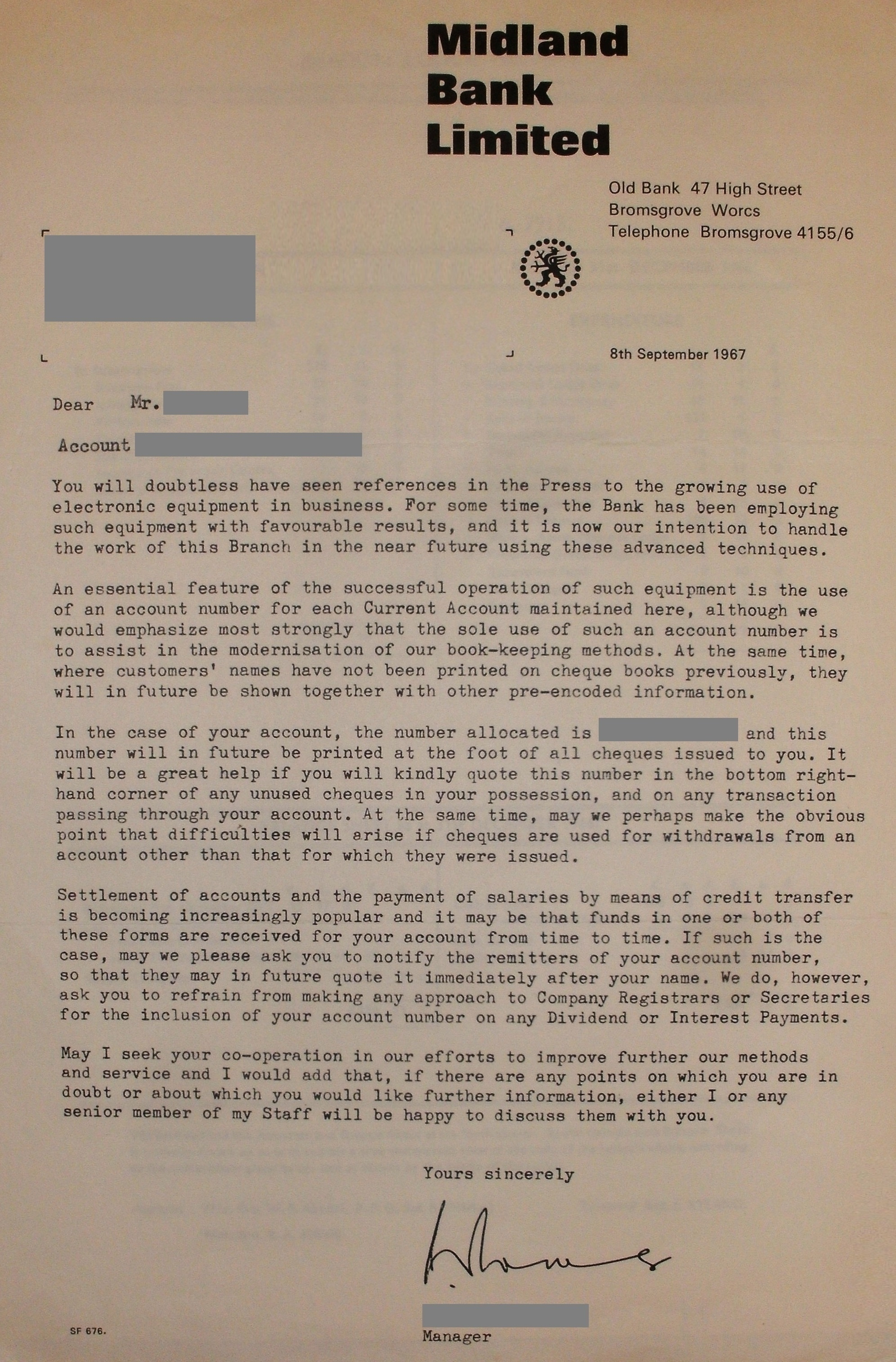
1967 Letter from the Midland Bank to a customer, Mr. … , informing him on the introduction on electronic data processing and on account numbers for current accounts

A bank account is a financial account maintained by a bank or other financial institution in which the financial transactions between the bank and a customer are recorded. Each financial institution sets the terms and conditions for each type of account it offers, which are classified in commonly understood types, such as deposit accounts, credit card accounts, current accounts, loan accounts or many other types of account. A customer may have more than one account. Once an account is opened, funds entrusted by the customer to the financial institution on deposit are recorded in the account designated by the customer. Funds can be withdrawn from the accounts in accordance with their terms and conditions.

The financial transactions which have occurred on a bank account within a given period of time are reported to the customer on a bank statement, and the balance of the accounts of a customer at any point in time represents their financial position with the institution.

== Nature of a bank account ==
In most legal systems, a deposit of funds in a bank is not a bailment; that is, the actual funds deposited by a person in a bank cease to be the property of the depositor and become the property of the bank. The depositor acquires a claim against the bank for the sum deposited but not to the actual cash handed over to the bank. In accounting terms, the bank creates ("opens") an account in the name of the depositor or a name directed by the depositor in which the amount received is recorded as a transaction. The deposit account is a liability of the bank and an asset of the depositor (the account holder).

On the other hand, a bank can lend some or all of the money it has on deposit to third parties. Such accounts, generally called loan or credit accounts, are subject to similar but reverse principles of a deposit account. In accounting terms, a loan account is an asset of the bank and a liability of the borrower. Loan accounts may be unsecured or secured with collateral from the borrower, and they may be guaranteed by a third person, with or without security.

Each financial institution sets the terms and conditions for each type of account it offers, and when a customer applies for the opening of an account, and is accepted by the institution, they form the contract between the financial institution and the customer in relation to the account.

The laws of each country specify how bank accounts may be opened and operated. They may specify who may open an account, for example, how the signatories can identify themselves, deposit and withdrawal limits among other specifications.

The minimum age for opening a bank account is most commonly 18 years. However, in some countries, the minimum age to open a bank account can be 13 years, and accounts may be opened in the name of minors but operated by their parent or guardian. In general, it is unlawful to open an account in a false name.

== Account structure ==
From the customer's point of view, bank accounts may have a positive, or credit balance, when the financial institution owes money to the customer; or a negative, or debit balance, when the customer owes the financial institution money.

Broadly, accounts that hold credit balances are referred to as deposit accounts, and accounts opened to hold debit balances are referred to as loan accounts. Some accounts can switch between credit and debit balances.

Some accounts are categorized by the function rather than nature of the balance they hold, such as savings account, which routinely are in credit.

Financial institutions have an account numbering scheme to identify each account, which is important as a customer may have multiple accounts.

== Types of accounts ==
Each financial institution has its own names for the various accounts it offers to customers, but these can be categorised as:

- Deposit account
  - Transactional account
    - Checking account
    - Current account
  - Personal account
  - Transaction deposit (USA)
- Savings account
  - Individual (UK)
  - Time deposit (Bond) / Fixed deposit
    - Certificate of deposit (USA)
  - Tax-exempt special savings account (TESSA) (UK)
  - Tax-Free Savings Account (Canada)
  - Money-market
  - Securities account
- Other account types
  - Loan account
  - Joint account
  - Low-cost account
  - Numbered bank account
  - Negotiable Order of Withdrawal account (NOW) (USA)

== See also ==
- Bank card number
- Bank secrecy
- Bank statement
- Chart of accounts
- International Bank Account Number (IBAN)
- ISO 9362 - International bank identifier code standard
- ISO 13616 - International bank account numbers standard
- Society for Worldwide Interbank Financial Telecommunication (SWIFT)
- Swiss bank account
- Money laundering
- Online banking
- Telephone banking
