= Retail banking =

Offering of services by a financial institution to the general public

UML class diagram depicting retail banking

Retail banking, also known as consumer banking or personal banking, is the provision of services by a bank to the general public, rather than to companies, corporations or other banks, which are often described as wholesale banking (corporate banking).

Banking services which are regarded as retail include provision of savings and transactional accounts, mortgages, personal loans, debit cards, and credit cards. Retail banking is also distinguished from investment banking or commercial banking. It may also refer to a division or department of a bank which deals with individual customers.

In the U.S., the term commercial bank is used for a normal bank to distinguish it from an investment bank. After the Great Depression, the Glass–Steagall Act restricted normal banks to banking activities, and investment banks to capital market activities. That distinction was repealed in the 1990s. Commercial bank can also refer to a bank or a division of a bank that deals mostly with deposits and loans from corporations or large businesses, as opposed to individual members of the public (retail banking).

== Products ==
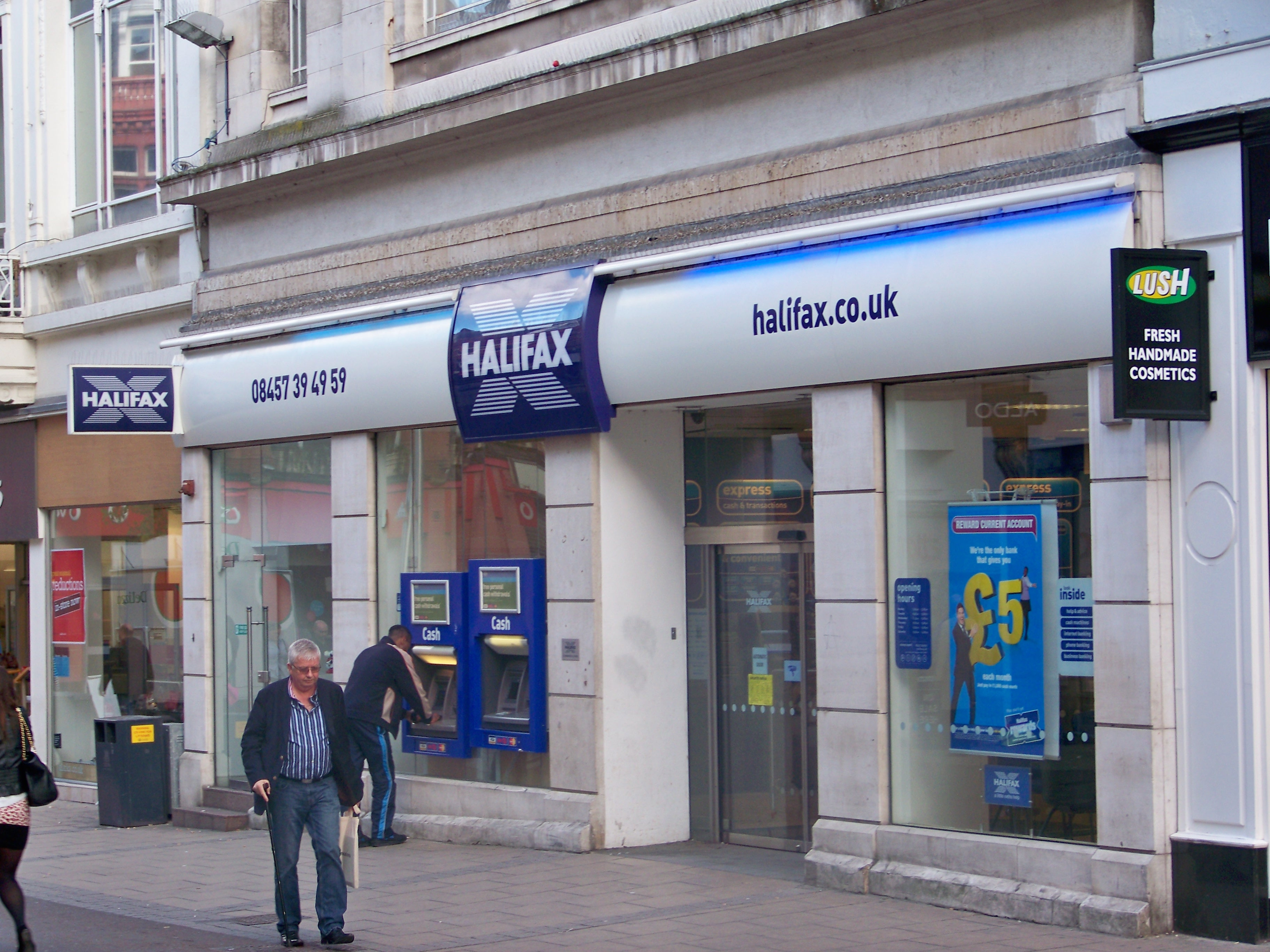
A retail bank in Leeds, United Kingdom

Typical banking services offered by retail banks include:

- Transactional accounts
  - Checking accounts (American English)
  - Current accounts (British English)
- Savings accounts
- Debit cards
- ATM cards
- Credit cards
- Traveler's cheques
- Mortgages
- Home equity loans
- Personal loans
- Certificates of deposit/Term deposits

In some countries, such as the U.S., retail bank services also include more specialised accounts, such as:

- Sweep accounts
- Money market accounts
- Individual Retirement Accounts (IRA's)

== Sub-types of retail banks ==
- Community development bank are regulated banks that provide financial services and credit to underserved markets or populations.
- Private banks manage the assets of high-net-worth individuals.
- Offshore banks are banks located in jurisdictions with low taxation and regulation. Many offshore banks are essentially private banks.
- Savings banks accept savings deposits.
- Postal savings banks are savings banks associated with national postal systems.

== See also ==
- Banking institution
- Financial risk management § Commercial and retail banking
