= Flexi Fixed Deposits =

Financial product

A flexi-fixed deposit is a special kind of deposit offered by banks in India. It is a combination of a demand deposit and a fixed deposit. The depositor is able to enjoy both the liquidity of savings and current accounts and the high returns of fixed deposits.

== Mode of working ==
A Flexi-Fixed deposit has two features that effectively combine the benefits of savings and current accounts and fixed deposits:

- The "auto-sweep feature (sweep-in)": The balance in excess of a stipulated amount is automatically transferred to a fixed deposit (FD) account for a default term of one year. By this transference, amounts in excess of a fixed limit can earn a substantially higher rate of return. FDs formed through auto sweep carry the interest rate on FD of one year, based upon the rate on the day of the auto sweep. Hence, the Flexi Fixed deposit scheme has two components: a savings and current account component, and a fixed deposit account component.
- Reverse sweep (sweep-out): In case of insufficient funds in a savings account to honour any debit instruction (e.g., when the customer wants to withdraw money through cheque or through an ATM), the balance in the FD to the extent needed to meet the shortfall is automatically withdrawn in multiples of ₹1000 (or any other amount set by the bank). The remaining balance in the FD continues to earn higher interest at the original rate applicable to FDs. In the event the customer wants to withdraw more than what is deposited in his savings account, the bank would withdraw money from the fixed deposit component.

Many banks do not allow customers to take out loans against amounts in the FD component of Flexi Fixed deposits.
