= The One account =

Royal Bank One account
- Company type: Bank account
- Industry: Financial services
- Founded: 1997; 29 years ago
- Defunct: 18-Sep-2025
- Headquarters: Norwich, England, United Kingdom
- Products: Offset mortgage account
- Parent: The Royal Bank of Scotland
- Website: www.rbs.co.uk/royalbankoneaccount

The One account is British personal bank account with The Royal Bank of Scotland offering offset and flexible mortgages. As of 2013, the account is no longer available for new customers but continues to be supported for existing clients. It has been permanently decommissioned in September 2025. All existing clients are supported through e-banking channels.

== History ==
The company pioneered the offset mortgage in the UK; it was conceived as a joint venture between Virgin Direct (Virgin's financial services company) and The Royal Bank of Scotland in 1997.

Initially, the company was known as the 'Virgin One account' and promoted to Virgin Direct's 200,000 strong UK customer base. The launch was very successful and was extended to the entire British public in May 1998.

From January 2003, the company relaunched as 'The One account' when The Royal Bank of Scotland took a majority shareholding, becoming an RBS mortgage brand along with NatWest and First Active. In November 2024 the product aligned to the Royal Bank of Scotland brand.

The One account is operated directly by phone, internet and post, with the customer service originally being provided on a 24/365 basis, but has since been reduced to a weekday service.

The account was sold directly by phone, internet and post, One Account products were distributed through intermediaries, mortgage brokers and independent financial advisers. The account is no longer available to new customers.

== Current account mortgages ==
The type of offset products offered by The One account are called current account mortgages (CAM). As the name suggests, customers consolidate the balances of their mortgage, traditional current accounts, personal loans and, if desired, their saving accounts into one account.

A low, mortgage-style interest rate is charged on the net balance of the account on a daily basis. Since customers pay their salary into the account this money has the effect of reducing the average balance and, therefore the interest paid when compared with a traditional mortgage loan.
