= Regulation Q =

US Federal Reserve banking regulation

Regulation Q (12 CFR 217) is a Federal Reserve regulation which sets out capital requirements for banks in the United States. The version of Regulation Q current as of 2023 was enacted in 2013.

From 1933 until 2011, an earlier version of Regulation Q imposed various restrictions on the payment of interest on deposit accounts. During that entire period, it prohibited banks from paying interest on demand deposits. From 1933 until 1986 it also imposed maximum rates of interest on various other types of bank deposits, such as savings accounts and NOW accounts. That version of Regulation Q no longer exists; all its remaining aspects, such as the type of entities that may own or maintain interest-bearing NOW accounts, were incorporated into Regulation D.

== History ==
As a result of Section 11 of the Banking Act of 1933, Regulation Q was promulgated by the Federal Reserve Board on August 29, 1933. In addition to prohibiting the payment of interest on demand deposits (a prohibition that the act also wrote into the Federal Reserve Act (12 U.S.C.371a) as Section 19(i)), it was also used to impose interest rate ceilings on various other types of bank deposits, including savings and time deposits. The motivation for the deposit interest restrictions was the perception that the bank failures of the early 1930s, during the first part of the Great Depression, had been caused in part by excessive bank competition for deposit funds, driving down the margin between lending rates and borrowing rates and encouraging overly speculative investment behavior on the part of large banks.

As interest rates in general rose during the 1950s, banks felt increasing incentive to work around the interest ceilings by competing on the basis of convenience features such as multiple branch banks and on the basis of pecuniary features such as loan interest rate discounts that were tied directly to deposit account balances. A more direct challenge was the creation of NOW accounts, which were structured to effectively be the equivalent of interest-bearing demand deposits but to technically avoid being demand deposits. Congress legalized these for Massachusetts and New Hampshire in 1974, the rest of New England in 1976, and nationwide on December 31, 1980.

The imposed cap on savings deposit interest rates also encouraged the emergence of alternatives to banks, including money market funds. As a result of these challenges to interest rate ceilings, Congress permitted the creation of new types of flexible-interest bank accounts, including money market accounts as of December 14, 1982. Regulation Q ceilings for savings accounts and all other types of accounts except for demand deposits were phased out during the period 1981–1986 by the Depository Institutions Deregulation and Monetary Control Act of 1980; as of March 31, 1986, all interest rate ceilings had been eliminated except for the ban on demand deposit interest, which was then the only remaining substantive component of Regulation Q.

The Regulation Q prohibition of interest-bearing demand deposit accounts was effectively repealed by the Dodd–Frank Wall Street Reform and Consumer Protection Act of 2010 (Pub. L. 111-203 §627). Beginning July 21, 2011, financial institutions have been allowed, but not required, to offer interest-bearing demand deposits.
