= Pay Off Your Mortgage in Two Years =

British television series

- Country of origin: United Kingdom
- Original language: English

Pay Off Your Mortgage in Two Years is a television programme first aired on BBC Two in early 2006. Its follow-up series Did They Pay Off Their Mortgage in Two Years? began airing in January 2007.

Presented by business expert René Carayol, the programme is an experiment that aims to find out if ordinary people in the United Kingdom can pay off their mortgage in two years. Various methods of mortgage acceleration are explained to help viewers succeed in paying off their mortgages early.

== Pay Off Your Mortgage in Two Years (first series) ==
Each of the eight episodes aired weekly in 2006 focused on one family or individual, who at the time of filming had already been followed for twelve months, i.e. they were halfway through the experiment. In the follow-up series, aired in 2007, their experiences in the second year was shown.

The participants were from all ages and from all walks of life, including a couple nearing retirement, families with young children, a lesbian couple and a male ballet dancer.

Success in the experiment required minimizing expenses as well as maximizing income. To achieve the former, participants grew their own food, for example. In pursuit of the latter, they sold off possessions, rented out their house or tried to develop various business initiatives,

Such as creating works of art, giving yoga or exercise classes, becoming a Cliff Richard impersonator or buy and renovate houses. In some cases, leaving the "comfort zone" and persevering required hard-nosed presenter Carayol to, in his own words, "push them to their limits". One of the participants, a single woman, gave up and was replaced.

== Did They Pay Off Their Mortgage in Two Years? (second series) ==
The second series of weekly programmes began on 11 January 2007. The six episodes followed the trials and tribulations of all those that agreed to initially take part. Two of the couples paid off their mortgage, including Dan & Lucy with their successful Hotpod burners – the prototype of which Carayol originally found in Dan and Lucy's living room and subsequently helped turn into a thriving business.

With the series attracting praise from the media and the focus shifting more from mortgages to that of the transformations in all the contestants' lives, the series was moved from a 7:30pm airing on BBC Two to a later timeslot of 8pm.
