= Open Bank =

Korean American bank

OP Bancorp
- Type: Public
- Traded as: Nasdaq: OPBK; Russell 2000 Index Component
- Industry: Banking
- Founded: 2005; 21 years ago
- Headquarters: Los Angeles, California, U.S.
- Key people: Sang Oh (president and CEO)
- Services: Commercial banking
- Revenue: $135.8 million (2023)
- Website: myopenbank.com

Open Bank is an American community bank based in California that focuses on the Korean American community. The bank offers commercial banking services.

As of 2022, it had nine branches located in California, one branch in Texas, one branch in Nevada, four loan production offices - two located in Washington, one in Colorado, one in Georgia, and a home loan center in Los Angeles. It is one of five major Korean-American banks in the United States.

== History ==
The bank was established on June 10, 2005 as First Standard Bank as a California state-chartered bank headquartered in Los Angeles, California. The bank changed its name to Open Bank in October 2010. In March 2018, the bank announced the launch of its initial public offering of common stock by offering 2,000,000 shares. The initial public offering was priced between $9.50 and $11.50 per share. Min Kim, chief executive officer of the bank, rang the closing bell at the NASDAQ on April 6, 2018.

== Services ==
The bank promotes itself as a "faith-based" community bank focusing on relationship banking between its customers and community.

The bank offers regular banking services and products to its customers in California. This includes certificates of deposit, installment accounts, money market accounts, retirement accounts, demand and time deposits, and savings accounts, as well as various personal and business checking accounts. The company also provides commercial lending products, including business line of credit, business term loans, and commercial real estate term loans; trade financing products and services comprising issuance of letters of credit, import and export financing, revolving lines of credit, clean and documentary collections, and others; small and medium-sized business administration lending products; and home mortgage financial solutions. In addition, it offers online banking, mobile banking, bill pay, debit and credit card, safe deposit boxes, transfer, cash management, and e-statement services.
