= Regulation D =

In United States finance, Regulation D may refer to:

- Regulation D (FRB), the regulation of bank deposits by the Federal Reserve Board
- Regulation D (SEC), the regulation of securities by the Securities and Exchange Commission
