= Carayol =

Carayol is a surname. Notable people with the surname include:

- Mustapha Carayol (born 1988), Gambian footballer
- René Carayol (born 1958), Gambian-British broadcaster and author
