= Parimal Trivedi =

Scholar

Parimal Trivedi is an adviser for education and former Vice-Chancellor of the Gujarat University, the largest university of Gujarat state of India, from 2006 to 2012.

== Career ==
He served as a professor with MG Science College before being appointed as the Vice-Chancellor of the Gujarat University. After end of his tenure, he returned to MG Science College to serve as a professor.

== Controversy ==
He was involved in several controversies during his tenure as Vice-Chancellor such as corruption allegation in fixed deposit and favouritism allegation in appointments involving his wife. He was arrested in 2012 for an alleged casteist remark against a teacher in 2008. He was later granted bail.
