= Interest Rate Commission Agent Banking System =

Interest Rate commission Agent Banking System (AIRCABS) is a system adopted by the bank to be an agent of investors loan funding to entrepreneurs getting the fund seller and buyer agreement to administer the loan after disbursement by retaining reasonable interest rate or dividend commission from the agreed investors loan funding credit price or dividend. To adopt AIRCABS, banks can develop three-track lending strategies.

The "360 Degree" strategy involves the investor, entrepreneur, and AIRCABS (agent bank) which are known to each other. An investor funds the entrepreneur's project without pledging collateral. The AIRCABS here serves as an agent for investor loan funding. If investor or entrepreneur fail to continue the loan transaction, AIRCABS can sell the loan to new entrant investor or rent the entrepreneur's project to new entrant entrepreneur without ownership transfer.

The "180-Degree" strategy is between investors, entrepreneurs, and agent banks which are not known to each other. The agent bank selects feasible project that fit the investor's interest. The agent bank disburses the funds to the entrepreneurs and administer the loan on behalf of investor till settlement. Collateral pledging by an entrepreneur is mandatory here. If investor or entrepreneur fail to continue the loan transaction AIRCABS can sell the loan to new entrant investor or rents the entrepreneur's project to new entrant entrepreneur without ownership transfer.

The "90-Degree" strategy. The parties involved are the money depositor and the bank. The depositor can shift to investor position by investing the deposit on the bank already invested project to get credit price under AIRCABS Administration.
