= Offset loan =

An offset loan is a type of lending arrangement, usually for a mortgage, in which a borrower also maintains a savings account with the lender. Instead of receiving interest on the savings account, the interest payment due on the loan is calculated only on the net balance of the loan minus the savings account. The regular payment is calculated on the full amount of the loan, however, and so making regular payments pays off the loan faster than a standard loan with the same interest rate, amount, and periodic payment.

Lenders usually charge a higher interest rate on offset loans than other types of loans. That makes offset loans a good idea only for borrowers who normally have large cash balances. If the cash to be used to offset is permanently available to pay down the mortgage and is not needed for emergency spending, borrowers are normally better off prepaying a more typical mortgage.

A customer with a $150,000 home loan over 30 years would pay approximately $167,190 in interest. A customer with an offset account linked to the home loan for the entire loan term with a constant balance of $10,000 in it would pay the loan off in 26 years and 4 months, with only approximately $127,553 in interest. That is a saving of three years and eight months and approximately $38,636.95 in interest.

Many offset loans are also flexible in their periodic payment amounts, allowing for overpayment or underpayment if prior overpayment has been made. That makes them more attractive to some of the people likely to use them (those with irregular income), but that is not a key defining feature of the loan.

== How it works ==
An offset loan involves a savings account and a mortgage loan. The value of the savings account is subtracted from the value of the mortgage and the difference between the amounts is used to calculate the interest charged on the mortgage loan. For example, if an accountholder has a $100,000 mortgage and $10,000 in their offset savings account, the amount of interest they pay on the mortgage is calculated off of $90,000. The money in the savings account isn't used to pay back the mortgage and can still be withdrawn at any time. While the money in the offset savings account doesn't accrue interest like a balance in a traditional savings account does, the interest earned on the balance in a traditional savings account is subject to taxes. Therefore, it is often lucrative for the accountholder to forgo the interest they would earn on the balance in a traditional savings account and use the savings to reduce the interest owed on their mortgage payment.

== Benefits ==
An offset mortgage offers a few benefits for accountholders. One way they benefit is by being able to pay off their mortgage sooner or make smaller payments as time goes on. Additionally, the money in the offset savings account is not locked away, it can still be accessed and withdrawn like money in any savings account.

== See also ==
- Offset agreement
- Offset mortgage
- Flexible mortgage
