= International Money Transfers System Leader =

- Type: Joint Stock Company
- Industry: Financial services
- Founded: 2003
- Headquarters: Moscow, Russia
- Key people: Olga Vilkul (Chairman of the Board of Directors); Konstantin Solov`ev and (Chairman of the Board)
- Website: www.leadermt.com

Leader System is a company based in Russia. The full title of the company is International Money Transfers System Leader (Система «Международные денежные переводы Лидер»). The company is headquartered in Moscow, Russia.

== History ==
The International Money Transfers System Leader is an international operator of person-to-person money transfers. The Leader System was founded in April 2003. It provides money transferring services to persons without opening an account. Also it accepts payments for the services of various providers. There are over 130 000 locations in 130 countries worldwide in the geography of the Leader System. There are over 1000 service providers in Russia and CIS whose services the System Clients can pay for.

== Operations ==
Leader System is among the top five funds transferring in Russia and CIS operators. The organizer of the Leader System is The Non-bank Credit Organization Joint Stock Company “Leader” (NCO JSC Leader, Moscow, Russia, Central Bank of Russian Federation license number 3304-K). Turnover of The Leader System is US$1.78 billion in 2009, US$2.3 billion in 2010 and US$1.15 billion within the first 6 months of 2011.

== Services ==
Sending and receiving money transfers is the core of company’s services. The transfer is not strictly refer to a concrete bank-recipient, which means the transfer can be given out at any location in the receipt country. In order to forward money a Sender-Client presents funds at any Leader System location for transfer service, receives the Money Transfer Control Number (MTCN) from an operator and transmits it to the recipient. The natural person, a recipient, can come to any location, presenting the MTSN and a photo ID. The data proves correct, the operator gives out the money. The transfer is delivered instantly, taking 2–3 minutes. Besides paying out cash, a sum can be transferred to the Client’s bank account of the recipient. The Sender can monitor the transfer status online at the System website.

=== Mobile transfers ===
Service is available in Russia only. A Client can forward funds from his account at any of the three mobile operators – Beeline, Megafon or Smarts.

=== Transfer Fees ===
Fees differ based on originating and receiver countries and type of transfer.

=== LEADER-Bonus ===
All Leader System Client Card holders participate in Leader-Bonus loyalty program.

=== Terminal processing ===
Banks or agents connected to terminal processing of Leader System can accept payments for various providers. The leading mobile operators, internet and communal service providers, state institutions, travel agencies and airlines, as well as many others, are among them.

== Company management ==
Chairman of the Board of Directors – Olga Vilkul.

== Participating in Associations ==
Russian national association SWIFT, Association of Russian Banks (ARB)

== Awards ==
“The best money transfer system of the North-Western federal region” in collaboration with People’s Republic of China on providing service to small- and medium-scale businesses. Laureate of the First International competition “Leader of Money Transfer Systems - 2011” (Ukraine) in the nomination of “Flexible loyalty systems for clients and banks”.
