= Sweep investment =

A sweep investment, or sweep investment account, is a secondary bank account or type of sweep account that offers additional investment options on idle funds in a primary cash or checking account.

== How it Works ==
At the end of each business day, the bank automatically scans and determines what funds in the person's account are idle. It then transfers the funds to preselected interest-earning accounts. At the start of the following business day, the investment plus interest accrued is credited to the primary account. Due to the timing of these transactions, there is never a conflict of demand for the funds

== Drawbacks ==
Since it is not a deposit, it is not federally insured. Furthermore, like all investments, it may lose value.

== Customers ==
Sweep investment accounts are generally offered to individuals and small business owners.
