= Custodia Bank =

American bank specializing in cryptocurrency

- Formerly: Avanti Bank
- Type: Privately held company
- Industry: Financial services
- Founded: 2020; 6 years ago
- Founder: Caitlin Long
- Headquarters: Cheyenne, Wyoming, United States
- Area served: Wyoming
- Products: Crypto currencies, custodian bank
- Number of employees: 36 (2024)
- Website: custodiabank.com

Custodia Bank, previously known as Avanti Bank, is an American bank specializing in crypto currencies. The bank is based in Cheyenne, Wyoming. The bank was launched in 2020 and secured a Wyoming state banking charter, but subsequently faced US Federal government pushback. As of 2025 it was largely dormant while it attempted to clear regulatory hurdles.

== History ==
=== Founding and regulatory concerns ===
Wyoming's state legislature has worked to position the state as a crypto-friendly hub, and has passed several laws to enable state-chartered crypto banks called Special Purpose Depository Institutions (SPDIs).

The bank's founder, Caitlin Long, has played a significant role in shaping Wyoming's crypto-friendly banking legislation. And the bank has benefited from a series of state laws facilitating digital asset banking.

In 2020, after Custodia secured a Wyoming state banking charter, it raised $37 million from venture investors but has since faced regulatory push back at the federal level.

Critics argue that the laws enabling the creation of Custodia were designed to favor large crypto players rather than fostering broader financial innovation. Custodia was one of four such SPDIs in Wyoming but had remained largely inactive while its Federal Reserve application was pending.

=== Federal Reserve lawsuit ===
On January 27, 2023, The Federal Reserve Board officially denied Custodia's application for Federal Reserve System membership, citing "significant safety and soundness risks". The rejection added to concerns about the viability of crypto banking in Wyoming. Other concerns were how handling digital assets could bypass traditional oversight, raising issues of money laundering and financial instability, due to concerns over its fee-based business model, lack of FDIC insurance, and acceptance of crypto assets like Bitcoin and Ether as deposits.

Custodia filed a lawsuit against the Federal Reserve Board and the Federal Reserve Bank of Kansas City in June 2022, arguing that its application was unjustly delayed. Custodia's legal argument hinges on the Monetary Control Act of 1980, which it claims guarantees all banks access to Fed services, a position supported by digital asset groups and bipartisan legal experts but opposed by federal regulators.

The case reached a judge's decision in March 2024, ruling against Custodia, but the bank is appealing the decision in the U.S. Court of Appeals for the 10th Circuit.

By late 2024 the bank laid off nine of its 36 employees to preserve capital amid its ongoing legal battle with the Federal Reserve. Long attributed the layoffs to what she called "Operation Choke Point 2.0," a federal effort that she claims is restricting crypto firms.

Major banking groups, including the American Bankers Association and Wyoming Bankers Association, have sided with the Fed, arguing that granting Custodia access could pose risks to the financial system.
