= Sweep account =

Bank account with automatically managed funds

A sweep account is an account set up at a bank or other financial institution where the funds are automatically managed between a primary cash account and secondary investment accounts.

== Function ==
A sweep account combines two or more accounts at a bank or a financial institution, moving funds between them in a predetermined manner. Sweep accounts are useful in managing a steady cash flow between a cash account used to make scheduled payments, and an investment account where the cash is able to accrue a higher return.

Many banks and financial institutions offer a sweep account service for personal customers and small business owners. They have also become part of the arsenal of services offered by credit card companies.

== Mechanics ==
In banking, sweep accounts were primarily used as a legal workaround to the prohibition on paying interest on business checking accounts, which has since been repealed. In this system, the funds are described as being "swept overnight" into an investment vehicle of some kind. The choices for sweep investments are often either money funds, "eurodollar sweeps", or "repo sweeps".

Eurodollar sweeps are legal transfers of funds to the bank's offshore entities, although essentially they are just an accounting technique to allow the banks to have full lending of the funds without the reserve requirements normally required and without having to pay for FDIC insurance (as the sweep is uninsured). Essentially, the funds are just unsecured obligations of the bank, and therefore are paid the highest interest rate offered by the bank to overnight deposit borrowings.

"Repo sweeps" ("repo" meaning "repurchase agreement") are for companies that are concerned about the safety of the bank. In this arrangement, the swept funds on deposit with the bank are secured by some of the bond holdings of the bank. If the bank were to fail, the depositor would just be given the bond holdings and then could sell the bonds to get their money back (unless something happens to the bond prices in the interim).

Larger corporate bank accounts are charged numerous fees for each of the services the bank offers (such as a charge per every check deposited), however the bank rebates these fees based on the companies account balances in a process known as account analysis.

=== How it actually works ===
In a sweep account

1. A cash account is set up first and a lump sum of money is deposited into that account.
2. A financial advisor and the client will discuss and determine an average balance that should be kept in this account. Depending on the institution's service, this amount may be pre-determined.
3. Most of the extra cash above the average balance will be invested into a money market, CD, or some other form of investment that can be easily liquidated.
4. When the balance in the cash account falls below the pre-determined average balance, some of the investment is liquidated and the proceeds get deposited into the cash account, thus maintaining the average balance.

If the initial calculations are done correctly, the interest on the cash and returns on the investments should yield a large enough return that will increase the total value of the sweep account.

During a bad economic cycle, the funds in the investment accounts may fall low enough that substantial gains will not be possible to maintain the average balance in the cash account. In these cases, the financial institutions would ask either for more funds to be put into the investment account, or recommend other forms of investments and liquidation.

The financial innovation of sweep accounts is particularly interesting because it was stimulated not only by the desire to avoid costly regulation, but also by a change in supply conditions – in this case technology.

== Company policy issues ==
Some companies choose to have all of their funds swept into a sweep account if they believe that the increased earnings will more than offset the fees they would have been rebated, should they have left the funds in the account. Other companies calculate the approximate amount needed to rebate the fees and then only sweep funds in excess of that amount.

Companies pay extra for more complex investment strategies, and for more detailed communication from their bank. For example, knowing when the checks they issue will probably clear, enables them to more precisely determine how to invest and for how long. This service is known controlled disbursement.

== See also ==
- Flexible mortgage
- Sweep investment
