= Deposit Insurance and Credit Guarantee Corporation =

RBI subsidiary

Reserve Bank of India (Specialised Division) overview
- Formed: 1978; 48 years ago
- Jurisdiction: Reserve Bank of India, Ministry of Finance, Government of India
- Headquarters: Mumbai, India
- Reserve Bank of India (Specialised Division) executive: M.D. Patra, Deputy Governor of RBI
- Key document: The Deposit Insurance and Credit Guarantee Corporation Act, 1961
- Website: www.dicgc.org.in

The Deposit Insurance and Credit Guarantee Corporation (DICGC) is a specialised division of the Reserve Bank of India, which is under the jurisdiction of the Ministry of Finance, Government of India. It was established on 15 July 1978 under the Deposit Insurance and Credit Guarantee Corporation Act (1961) for the purpose of providing insurance of deposits and guaranteeing of credit facilities.

The DICGC insures all bank deposits, such as saving, fixed, current, recurring deposit for up to the limit of Rs. 500,000 of each depositor in a bank. The limit was increased from 1 lakh to 5 lakh on 4 February 2020.

== Statistics ==
Deposit Amount Insurance
Year	Amount
1 Jan 1962	1,500
1 Jan 1968	5,000
1 Apr 1970	10,000
1 Jan 1976	20,000
1 Jul 1980	30,000
1 May 1993	1,00,000
4 Feb 2020	5,00,000

Per 100Rs Deposit Insurance
Year	Amount
1 Jan 1962	0.05
1 Oct 1971	0.04
1 Jul 1993	0.05
1 Apr 2004	0.08
1 Apr 2005	0.10
1 Apr 2020	0.12

The functions of the subsidiary are governed by the provisions of The Deposit Insurance and Credit Guarantee Corporation Act, 1961 (DICGC Act) and The Deposit Insurance and Credit Guarantee Corporation General Regulations, 1961 framed by the Reserve Bank of India in exercise of the powers conferred by sub-section (3) of Section 50 of the Act.

A maximum of ₹5,00,000 (after the budget of 2020–21) is insured for each user for both principal and interest amount. If the customer has accounts in different branches of the same bank, all of those accounts are clubbed together and the total sum is insured to a maximum of ₹5,00,000.

However, if there are more accounts in same bank, all of those are treated as a single account. The insurance premium is paid by the insured banks itself. This means that the benefit of deposit insurance protection is made available to the depositors or customers of banks free of cost.

The Corporation has the power to cancel the registration of an insured bank if it fails to pay the premium for three consecutive half-year periods. The Corporation may restore the registration of the bank if the bank makes a request and pays all the amounts due by way of premium from the date of default together with interest.

== Reforms ==
The Financial Sector Legislative Reforms Commission (FSLRC) was set up by the Government of India, Ministry of Finance, on 24 March 2011, to review and rewrite the legal-institutional architecture of the Indian financial sector. In its report the FSLRC recommended a regulatory structure consisting of seven agencies including a deposit insurance-cum regulatory agency (which was named as Resolution Corporation). The present DICGC will be subsumed into the Resolution Corporation (RC) which will work across the financial system.

The FSLRC proposal involved a unified resolution corporation aims to deal with financial firms such as banks and insurance companies and is concerned with financial firms which make highly intense promises to consumers, such as banks, insurance companies, defined benefit pension funds, and payment systems.

It will also take responsibility for the graceful resolution of systemically important financial firms, even if they have no direct links to consumers.

The Government of India introduced the Financial Resolution and Deposit Insurance bill, 2017 (FRDI bill) in Lok Sabha in the Monsoon session of 2017 to bring forth these reforms. There have been many concerns with regards to the new bill such as:

1. Presently the banks have to pay a sum to the DICGC as insurance premium which insures all kinds of bank deposits up to a limit of ₹5,000,000. In case a stressed bank had to be liquidated, the depositors would be paid through DICGC. Though the bill proposes the banks to pay a sum to the Resolution Corporation, it neither specifies the insured amount nor the amount a depositor would be paid. It is thus unclear how much a depositor would be paid in case of liquidation.
2. The bail in clause which largely worked against the interests of the depositors (as in Cyprus).
