= Transaction deposit =

In the United States, transaction deposit is a term used by the Federal Reserve for checkable deposits and other accounts that can be used directly as cash without withdrawal limits or restrictions. Such demand deposits are subject to reserve requirements imposed by the central bank that require the bank to keep reserves at the central bank. This is in contrast to "time deposits" (a.k.a. term deposits), which are not subject to reserve requirements.

== Regulations ==
Transaction accounts include all deposits against which the account holder is permitted to make withdrawals by negotiable or transferable instruments, payment orders of withdrawal, or by telephone or preauthorized transfers for the purpose of making payments to third persons or others. However, accounts subject to the rules that permit no more than six preauthorized, automatic, or other transfers per month (of which no more than three may be by check, draft, debit card, or similar order payable directly to third parties) are savings deposits, not transaction accounts.

== See also ==
- Checkable deposits
- Demand deposits
- Money supply
- Time deposits
