= Basic Savings Bank Deposit Account =

Savings account in India

Basic Savings Bank Deposit Account or BSBDA in India is a savings account that does not have a minimum balance. There is no upper limit cap for BSBDA.

There is also a BSBDA small account facility with simplified KYC with upper limit cap of 50000 rupees. BSBDA small accounts are valid for 12 months initially but can be extended for another 12 months if the customer provides proof that he has applied for officially valid documents. As per the RBI norms all banks in india have to offer BSBDA account facility to its customers. As per RBI norms a BSBDA account holder cannot hold any other savings account in the same bank. If a customer have any other kind of savings account in the bank but still wish to get BSBDA, in that case he have to close the existing savings account within 30 days after opening BSBDA. Existing savings account( other than BSBDA) can also be converted to BSBDA on the basis of the request of the customer.

The account holders can apply to receive a debit card and they can have certain number of deposits and withdrawals per month. The Reserve Bank of India has introduced this for obtaining financial inclusion objectives of the country.
