= Recurring deposit =

Kind of deposit offered by Indian banks

A recurring deposit is a special kind of term deposit in India that is offered by Indian banks and India Post, which helps people with regular incomes to deposit a fixed amount every month into their recurring deposit account and earn interest at the rate applicable to fixed deposits.

It's similar to making fixed deposits of a certain amount in monthly installments. This deposit matures on a specific date in the future, along with all the deposits made every month. Recurring deposit schemes allow customers to build up their savings through regular monthly deposits of a fixed sum over a fixed time. The minimum period of a recurring deposit is six months, and the maximum is ten years.

== Operation ==
The recurring deposit can be funded by standing instructions, which are instructions by the customer to the bank to withdraw a certain sum of money from his/her savings or current accounts and credit the recurring deposit account.

When the recurring deposit account is opened, the maturity value is indicated to the customer, assuming that the monthly installments will be paid regularly on due dates. If any installment is delayed, the interest payable in the account will be reduced and insufficient to reach the maturity value. Therefore, the difference in interest will be deducted from the maturity value as a penalty. The penalty rate will be fixed upfront. Interest is compounded quarterly in recurring deposits.

One can avail of loans against the collateral of a recurring deposit up to 80 to 90% of the deposit value.

The rate of interest offered is similar to that of regular fixed deposits.

== Formulas ==
The formula to calculate the interest is given as under $I=\frac {P\times n(n+1)r}{12\times 2\times 100}$ $=\frac {P\times n (n+1)r} {2400}$ where I is the interest, n is time in months, r is the rate of interest per annum, and P is the monthly deposit.

The formula to calculate the maturity amount is as follows: Total sum deposited+Interest on it $={P(n)}+I$ $= P*n[1+\frac {(n+1)r} {2400}]$.

Banks in India use the following formula for recurring deposit (RD) maturity value: (Maturity value of RD; based on quarterly compounding):

$M.V=\frac {R[(1+i)^{n}-1]}{1-(1+i)^{(-1/3)}}$

Where:

- $M.V$ = maturity value of the RD
- $R$ = monthly RD installment to be paid
- $n$ = number of quarters (tenure)
- $i$ = annual rate of interest / 400

== Taxation ==
Tax deduction at source (TDS) applies to recurring deposits in India. If the interest earned on recurring deposits exceeds Rs. 40,000 a year, TDS would be deducted by the bank at the rate of 10%. Income tax is to be paid on interest earned from a Recurring Deposit at the rate of tax slab of the Recurring Deposit holder. Investors without taxable income must submit a Form 15G to avoid TDS on recurring and fixed deposits. Investors who are senior citizens (above the age of 60) will have to file Form 15H to avoid TDS on recurring and fixed deposits.
