= Flexible mortgage =

Form of mortgage loans

The term flexible mortgage refers to a residential mortgage loan that offers flexibility in the requirements to make monthly repayments. The flexible mortgage first appeared in Australia in the early 1990s (hence the US term Australian mortgage), however it did not gain popularity until the late 1990s. This technique gained popularity in the US and UK recently due to the United States housing bubble.

The term mortgage acceleration is also used, as the mortgage loan can be paid off faster than standard mortgages if the borrower is in a position to do so. With traditional mortgages, borrowers often face large penalties for additional capital repayments or if payments were not made on time.

A specific type of flexible mortgage common in Australia and the United Kingdom is an offset mortgage. The key feature of an offset mortgage is the ability to reduce the interest charged by offsetting a credit balance against the mortgage debt, with interest charged based on the outstanding net debt. Some lenders have a single account for all transactions, this is often referred to as a current account mortgage.

== Features ==
Typical features include the facility:

- to make overpayments or extra repayments (more than the normal amount)
- to redraw (borrow back) any previous overpayments or extra repayments
- to underpay (pay less than the normal amount)
- to take a payment holiday (stop repayments for a period, typically 3 to 12 months).

Those features allow a flexible mortgage to be adaptable to individual circumstances. That is especially useful for borrowers who are self-employed and those with a variable income, which is not always fixed. By way of example, borrowers whose income includes a significant but irregular commission component might make use of commission payments to make overpayments, thereby reducing the term or enabling them to underpay at other times.

== Offset mortgages ==
A specific type of flexible mortgage common in Australia and the United Kingdom is an offset mortgage.

The key feature of an offset mortgage is the ability to reduce the interest charged by offsetting a credit balance against the mortgage debt.

For example, if the mortgage balance is $200,000 and the credit balance is $50,000, interest is charged only on the net balance of $150,000. Some lenders have a single account for all transactions, which is often referred to as a current account mortgage.

Lenders normally set a credit limit at outset of the mortgage and allow borrowers to credit and redraw up to this limit. The limit may be periodically reviewed. The lender may place restrictions on the lending limits towards the end of the mortgage term with the aim of ensuring capital repayment. However many lenders allow full drawdown up to the end date of the mortgage, when the loan must be repaid. That can cause great problems for undisciplined borrowers and those approaching retirement if the lender is unwilling to extend the term (especially on the grounds of age).

Other lenders have multiple accounts. There are at least a mortgage account and a deposit account. Often, the lender allows multiple accounts for credit balances and sometimes for debit balances. The different accounts allow borrowers to split their money notionally according to purpose while all accounts are offset each day against the mortgage debt.

=== Savings versus reduced interest ===
Offset mortgages are helpful because the interest rates on mortgages are higher than the interest rates of a savings account.

For example, if one has a home loan of $600,000 at 5% per year and an offset account in which one has deposited $200,000, one would be charged interest only on the $400,000 ($600,000 − $200,000). The new interest payable then amounts to $20,000 ($600,000 × 5% - $200,000 × 5% = $400,000 × 5%). Therefore, the interest has been basically reduced by $10,000 (200,000× 5%) in comparison to the original interest, $30,000.

Without an offset account, the $200,000 would be saved in a savings account, which would have an interest rate of 3.5% per year. If the money is in the account for one year, the interest earned would amount to $7,000 ($200,000 × 3.5%).

The former option allows reducing the interest by $10,000, and while the latter gives $7,000. Therefore, putting money in an offset account allows saving more money by reducing interest than any interest earned in your savings account. In some countries like Australia, government bodies like the Australian Taxation Office also tax any interest earned from savings, which reduces savings even more.

=== Tax advantage ===
Offset mortgages may have tax advantages for the borrower. Instead of earning interest on the credit balance (which may incur tax), the credit earns a reduction in the mortgage interest paid (which does not). For example, in the UK, offset mortgages are often marketed as offering "tax-efficient" savings. Interest generated within deposit accounts for UK residents is deemed income and is taxable. Subject to the personal savings allowance, the rate is at least 20%.

== See also ==
- Offset loan (finance)
