= Low-cost account =

A low-cost account is a Canada bank account that costs $4 or less per month. In February 2001, an agreement was reached with the Canadian federal government, which involved eight of Canada's major banks offering low-cost accounts to consumers, ensuring that every person has affordable banking. The accounts have benefits that include free deposits, a free debit card, cheques, free monthly statements, and up to 15 transactions per month.
