= Depository Institutions Deregulation and Monetary Control Act =

US financial statute passed in 1980

- Other short titles: Depository Institutions Deregulation and Monetary Control Act of 1980; Consumer Checking Account Equity Act of 1980; Depository Institutions Deregulation Act of 1980; Financial Regulation Simplification Act of 1980; Monetary Control Act of 1980; Truth in Lending Simplification and Reform Act
- Long title: An Act to facilitate the implementation of monetary policy, to provide for the gradual elimination of all limitations on the rates of interest which are payable on deposits and accounts, and to authorize interest-bearing transaction accounts, and for other purposes.
- Nicknames: Consumer Checking Account Equity Act of 1979
- Enacted by: the 96th United States Congress
- Effective: March 31, 1980

Citations
- Public law: 96-221
- Statutes at Large: 94 Stat. 132

Codification
- Titles amended: 12 U.S.C.: Banks and Banking
- U.S.C. sections amended: 12 U.S.C. ch. 3 § 226

Legislative history
- Introduced in the House as H.R. 4986 by Fernand St. Germain (D–RI) on July 27, 1979; Committee consideration by House Banking, Finance, and Urban Affairs, Senate Banking, Housing, and Urban Affairs; Passed the House on September 11, 1979 (367-39); Passed the Senate on November 1, 1979 (76-9); Reported by the joint conference committee on March 21, 1980; agreed to by the House on March 27, 1980 (380-13) and by the Senate on March 28, 1980 (agreed); Signed into law by President Jimmy Carter on March 31, 1980

The Depository Institutions Deregulation and Monetary Control Act of 1980 (H.R. 4986, Pub. L. 96–221) (often abbreviated DIDMCA or MCA) is a United States federal financial statute passed in 1980 and signed by President Jimmy Carter on March 31.

== Purposes ==
DIDMCA gave the Federal Reserve greater control over non-member banks.

- It forced all banks to abide by the Fed's rules.
- It relaxed the rules under which national banks could merge.
- It removed the power of the Federal Reserve Board of Governors under the Glass–Steagall Act to use Regulation Q to set maximum interest rates for any deposit accounts other than demand deposit accounts (with a six-year phase-out).
- It allowed Negotiable Order of Withdrawal accounts to be offered nationwide.
- It raised the deposit insurance of US banks and credit unions from $40,000 to $100,000.
- It allowed credit unions and savings and loans to offer checkable deposits.
- It allowed institutions to charge any loan interest rates they chose.

== Reasons and background ==
The act was in part a response to economic volatility and financial innovations of the 1970s that increasingly pressed the highly regulated savings and loan industry and arguably had unintended consequences that helped lead to the collapse and subsequent bailout of that financial sector. While S&Ls were freed to pay depositors higher interest rates, the institutions continued to carry large portfolios of loans paying them much lower rates of return; by 1981, 85 percent of the thrifts were losing money and the congressional response was the Garn–St Germain Depository Institutions Act of 1982.

The bill's passage is considered an important shift in the Democratic Party's positioning on economic regulation, as the party had historically defended New Deal era financial regulations, but had now come to favor financial deregulation. According to a 2022 study, this shift happened as a consequence of the congressional reforms of the 1970s, which undermined parochial and Southern populist interests within the Democratic Party. These parochial and populist interests favored a decentralized banking system. The party subsequently pursued deregulatory reforms that it perceived as beneficial to savers and consumers.

== Effects and criticism ==
Despite the initial popularity of the DIDMCA, legislative actions in states like Rhode Island and Minnesota have challenged its provisions, particularly those allowing national banks to export interest rates. These states are considering bills to opt out of this federal provision, aiming to exert more local control over interest rate regulations.

The legislative actions seeking to repeal DIDMCA-like policies have been criticized by examining Colorado's experience, as detailed in a study by J Howard Beales III and Andrew Stivers. They argue that Colorado's decision to opt out of federal banking law equality has led to reduced credit access, especially for consumers with lower credit scores or insufficient credit history. Their analysis suggests that such legislative limits on competition can exacerbate negative effects on citizens most in need of access to credit, highlighting the broader implications of undermining the DIDMCA's objectives.
