= Mortgage acceleration =

Mortgage acceleration is the practice of paying off a mortgage loan faster than required by terms of the mortgage agreement. As interest on mortgages is compounded, early payments diminish the period needed to pay off the mortgage, and avoid a quotient of compounded interest.

A commonplace method of mortgage acceleration is a so-called bi-weekly payment plan, in which half of the normal calendar monthly payment is made every two weeks, so that 13/12 of the yearly amount due is paid per annum. Commonplace too, is the practice of making ad hoc additional payments. The agreements associated with certain mortgages preclude or penalize early payments.

== Types ==
Financial institutions and intermediaries offer products such as mortgage-linked checking accounts, and home equity line of credit loan facilities advertised as being capable of assisting in achieving mortgage acceleration, and available at a range of premiums.

The claim made is that by using a particular type of loan in a particular way (often following a “program”), the borrower can cut many years off the mortgage without making additional repayments – or similarly, that although additional payments are made, the savings increase significantly due to the use of a particular loan and/or strategy.

The concept usually involves a type of loan that allows the borrower to use the loan as their day-to-day transaction account. This loan may refinance the entire mortgage, be in addition to the mortgage (requiring regular transfers to the mortgage) or in some cases involves an “offset” account, that sits separately to the mortgage but offsets interest on any deposit against the mortgage interest.

== Promoters ==
Promoters can profit from the sale of software, providing “monitoring” or “support”, or from commissions from referrals to lenders. Examples are usually presented that show huge savings on the mortgage. These examples may be based on the borrower's estimate of their regular expenditure, or on an “example” family. An underestimate of real expenditure (by the promoter or the borrower) leaves additional amounts in the mortgage (or related account) in the example, and the example therefore shows significant savings. However, the presentations represent that the savings are primarily due to the type of loan account and the way it is being used.
