= Negotiable order of withdrawal account =

In the United States, a negotiable order of withdrawal account (NOW account) is an interest-paying deposit account on which an unlimited number of checks may be written.

A negotiable order of withdrawal is essentially identical to a check drawn on a demand deposit account, but US banking regulations define the terms "demand deposit account" and "negotiable order of withdrawal account" separately. Until July 2011, Regulation Q stated that a demand deposit could not pay interest. NOW accounts were structured to comply with Regulation Q.

NOW accounts are considered checkable deposits, and are counted in the Federal Reserve Board's M1 definition of the money supply, as well as in the broader definitions. Like all other bank deposits, they are liabilities from the bank's perspective.

== History ==
The Banking Act of 1933 specified that no member bank "shall, directly or indirectly, by any device whatsoever, pay any interest on any deposit which is payable on demand", and on August 29, 1933, this restriction was incorporated into the Federal Reserve Board's new Regulation Q. The reason for the prohibition was that in a period of bank turmoil in the early years of the Great Depression, interest payments on demand deposits, especially by large New York banks, were viewed as "excessive competition" in the banking sector and supposedly led to diminished profit margins and hence bank failures, the latter because of both the diminished profit margins themselves and the resultant excessive stock market speculation by the New York banks.

At first, the general level of interest rates was low, and since the ban on demand deposit interest prevented only what would have been small interest payments, there was no significant attempt at avoiding the ban. In the 1950s, however, interest rates increased and so banks began to feel greater incentive to get around the ban. Non-pecuniary avoidance efforts included increased offering of convenience features such as large numbers of branch offices and giveaways of consumer goods to new customers. Pecuniary avoidance of the ban, known as implicit interest, included preferred loan rates (often explicitly tied to the customer's demand deposit balances) and below-cost service charges for services such as check-clearing.

The NOW account was developed as a more explicit challenge to the ban on interest payments by Ronald Haselton, President and CEO of the Consumer Savings Bank in Worcester, Massachusetts, leading to Congress permitting NOW accounts in Massachusetts and New Hampshire starting in January 1974, and in all of New England starting in March 1976. At the outset, there was a binding 5% interest rate ceiling on NOW accounts: all New England institutions offering them paid the full allowable 5% rate.

With no obvious adverse effects of NOW accounts in New England, Congress allowed them nationwide at all depository institutions beginning December 31, 1980. On March 31, 1986, as part of a general deregulation of interest rates, the interest ceiling on NOW accounts was abolished, but interest was still prohibited on demand deposits. Finally, on July 21, 2011, the ban on demand deposit interest (the only substantive remaining component of Regulation Q) was eliminated, which removed the only distinction between the two types of accounts.

== See also ==
- Canadian Payments Association has no such support for this account type.
- Money market account
