= Fixed deposit =

High-interest-yielding term deposit account

A fixed deposit (FD) is a tenured deposit account provided by banks or non-bank financial institutions which provides investors a higher rate of interest than a regular savings account, until the given maturity date. It may or may not require the creation of a separate account. The term fixed deposit is most commonly used in India and the United States. It is known as a term deposit or time deposit in Canada, Australia, New Zealand, and as a bond in the United Kingdom.

A fixed deposit means that the money cannot be withdrawn before maturity unlike a recurring deposit or a demand deposit. Due to this limitation, some banks offer additional services to FD holders such as loans against FD certificates at competitive interest rates. Banks may offer lesser interest rates under uncertain economic conditions. The tenure of an FD can vary from 7, 15 or 45 days to 1.5 years and can be as high as 10 years.

In India these investments can be safer than Post Office Schemes as they are covered by the Indian Deposit Insurance and Credit Guarantee Corporation (DICGC). However, DICGC guarantees amount up to ₹ 500000 (about $6850) per depositor per bank. In India they also offer income tax and wealth tax benefits.

== Functions of Fixed Deposits ==
Fixed deposits are high-interest-yielding term deposits and are offered by banks. The most popular form of term deposits are fixed deposits, while other forms of term deposits are recurring deposit and Flexi Fixed deposits (the latter is actually a combination of demand deposit and fixed deposit).

To compensate for the low liquidity, FDs offer higher rates of interest than saving accounts. The longest permissible term for FDs is 10 years. Generally, the longer the term of deposit, the higher is the rate of interest but a bank may offer a lower rate of interest for a longer period if it expects interest rates, at which the Central Bank of a nation lends to banks ("repo rates"), will dip in the future.

Usually the interest on FDs is paid every three months from the date of the deposit (e.g. if FD a/c was opened on 15 Feb, the first interest installment would be paid on 15 May). The interest is credited to the customers' Savings bank account or sent to them by cheque. This is a Simple FD. The customer may choose to have the interest reinvested in the FD account. In this case, the deposit is called the Cumulative FD or compound interest FD. For such deposits, the interest is paid with the invested amount on maturity of the deposit at the end of the term.

Although banks can refuse to repay FDs before the expiry of the deposit, they generally don't. This is known as a premature withdrawal. In such cases, interest is paid at the rate applicable at the time of withdrawal. For example, a deposit is made for 5 years at 8% but is withdrawn after 2 years. If the rate applicable on the date of deposit for 2 years is 5 percent, the interest will be paid at 5 percent. Banks can charge a penalty for premature withdrawal.

Banks issue a separate receipt for every FD because each deposit is treated as a distinct contract. This receipt is known as the Fixed Deposit Receipt (FDR), which has to be surrendered to the bank at the time of renewal or encashment.

Many banks offer the facility of automatic renewal of FDs where the customers do give new instructions for the matured deposit. On the date of maturity, such deposits are renewed for a similar term as that of the original deposit at the rate prevailing on the date of renewal.

Income tax regulations require that FD maturity proceeds exceeding Rs 20,000 not to be paid in cash. Repayment of such and larger deposits has to be either by "A/c payee" crossed cheque in the name of the customer or by credit to the saving bank a/c or current a/c of the customer.

Nowadays, banks give the facility of Flexi or sweep in FD, where in customers can withdraw their money through ATM, through cheque or through funds transfer from their FD account. In such cases, whatever interest is accrued on the amount they have withdrawn will be credited to their savings account (the account that has been linked to their FD) and the balance amount will automatically be converted in their new FD. This system helps them in getting their funds from their FD account at the times of emergency in a timely manner.

=== Types of Fixed Deposits ===
Fixed deposits in India are offered in several formats depending on the depositor’s needs. Banks commonly provide regular fixed deposits, tax-saving deposits with a mandatory five-year lock-in, senior-citizen deposits that offer higher interest rates to individuals aged sixty years and above, and cumulative or non-cumulative deposits where interest is either reinvested or paid out at periodic intervals. Non-resident Indians can also open NRE and NRO fixed deposits, with NRE deposits offering tax-free interest and NRO deposits being subject to Indian tax rules. These variations allow customers to choose deposit structures based on factors such as liquidity, tax treatment, and interest payout preferences.

== Benefits ==
- Customers can avail loans against FDs up to 80 to 90 percent of the value of deposits. The rate of interest on the loan could be 1 to 2 percent over the rate offered on the deposit.
- Residents of India can open these accounts for a minimum of seven days.
- Investing in a fixed deposit earns customers a higher interest rate than depositing money in a saving account.
- Tax saving fixed deposits are a type of fixed deposits that allow the investor to save tax under Section 80C of the Income Tax Act.

== Taxability ==
In India, tax is deducted at source by the banks on FDs if interest paid to a customer at any bank exceeds ₹ 10,000 in a financial year. This is applicable to both interest payable or reinvested per customer. This is called Tax deducted at Source and is presently fixed at 10% of the interest. With CBS banks can tally FD holding of a customer across various branches and TDS is applied if interest exceeds ₹ 10,000. Banks issue Form 16 A every quarter to the customer, as a receipt for Tax Deducted at Source.

However, tax on interest from fixed deposits is not 10%; it is applicable at the rate of tax slab of the deposit holder. If any tax on Fixed Deposit interest is due after TDS, the holder is expected to declare it in Income Tax returns and pay it by himself.

If the total income for a year does not fall within the overall taxable limits, customers can submit a Form 15 G (below 60 years of age) or Form 15 H (above 60 years of age) to the bank when starting the FD and at the start of every financial year to avoid TDS.

== How bank FD rates of interest vary with Central Bank policy ==
In certain macroeconomic conditions (particularly during periods of high inflation) a Central Bank adopts a tight monetary policy, that is, it hikes the interest rates at which it lends to banks ("repo rates"). Under such conditions, banks also hike both their lending (i.e. loan) as well as deposit (FD) rates. Under such conditions of high FD rates, FDs become an attractive investment avenue as they offer good returns and are almost completely secure with no risk. These can be checked with the excess rates in the country.

== See also ==
- Certificate of deposit
- Deposit (finance)
- Recurring deposit
- Savings account
- Time deposit
