= René Carayol =

British broadcaster, speaker, author (born 1958)

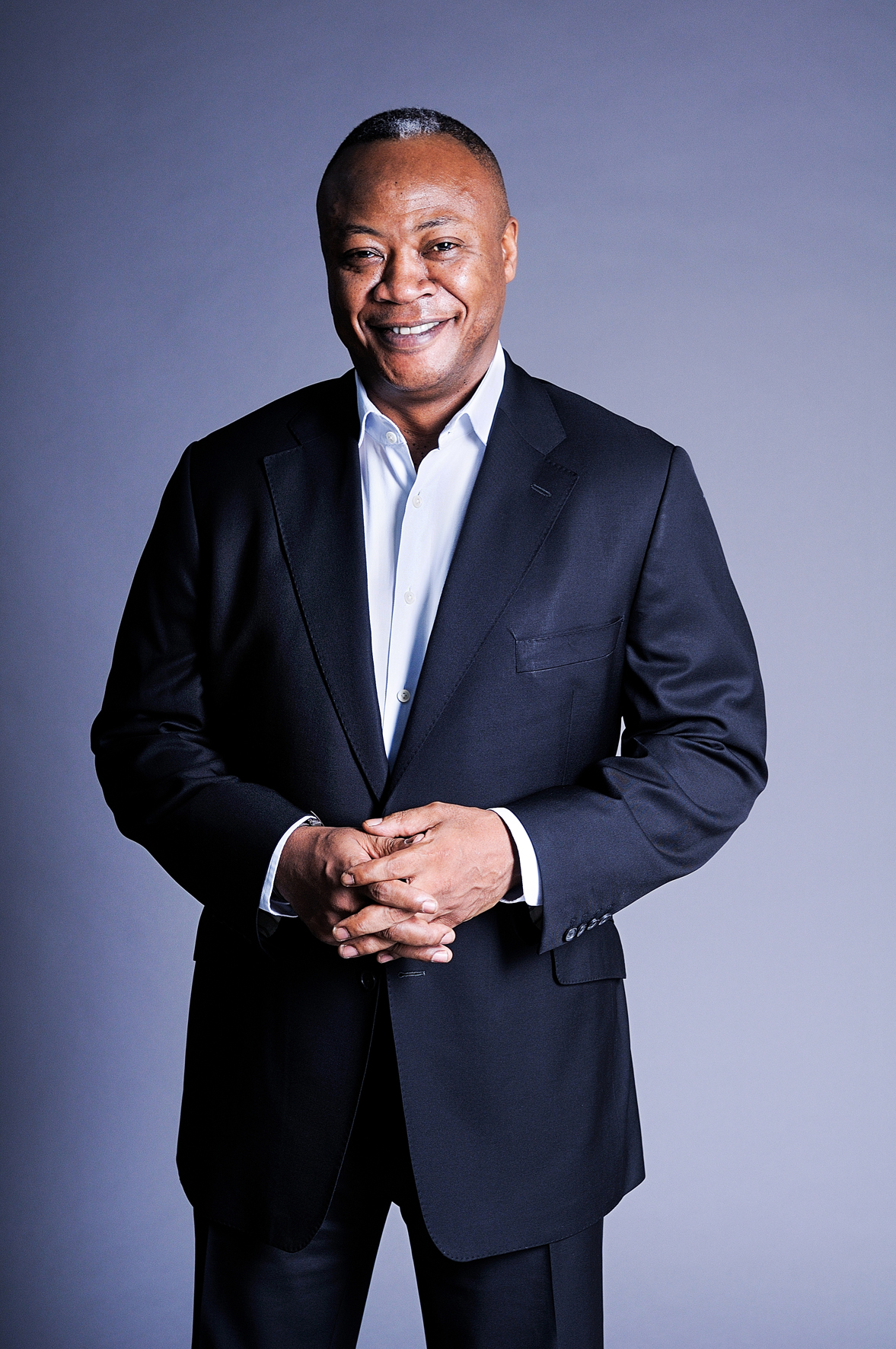
- Born: 10 September 1958
- Occupations: Motivational speaker, author

René Carayol MBE (born 10 September 1958) is a broadcaster and author.

He presented the BBC series Did They Pay Off Their Mortgage in Two Years? and is the author of SPIKE - What Are You Great At and Corporate Voodoo.

== Background and career ==
Born in The Gambia, the son of a diplomat, he was raised in the UK and now lives in London.

Carayol stated in Black Success Stories that Alex Haley's historic novel, Roots, was based on Carayol family records.

== Author ==
As an author he has produced three books - SPIKE - What Are You Great At, Corporate Voodoo in 2001 (now in its third edition) and the sequel, My Voodoo in 2002. René has been a regular broadsheet columnist, and columnist writer for The Sunday Telegraph supplement Business Reporter.

== Broadcaster ==
Carayol's television and radio career has seen him become a regular voice on BBC Radio 5 Live and present the critically acclaimed Channel 4 film The Man From The Met, on the challenges facing Sir John Stevens at the helm of the Metropolitan Police. He is also a press reviewer on Sky Breakfast News and has been an expert witness on Mind of a Millionaire.

Carayol is the presenter of BBC2's business program, Pay Off Your Mortgage In Two Years, which was shown in January and February 2006. The follow-up series Did They Pay Off Their Mortgage in Two Years? began airing in January 2007.

He also presented The Money Programme special "The Fall of BP's Sun King" in October 2007, investigating the real cause of Lord John Browne's resignation from BP.
