= Transaction account =

Bank holding that clients can access on demand

UML class diagram depicting a customer with accounts

A transaction account (also called a checking account, cheque account, chequing account, current account, demand deposit account, or share account at credit unions) is a deposit account or bank account held at a bank or other financial institution. It is available to the account owner "on demand" and is available for frequent and immediate access by the account owner or to others as the account owner may direct. Access may be in a variety of ways, such as cash withdrawals, use of debit cards, cheques and electronic transfer. In economic terms, the funds held in a transaction account are regarded as liquid funds. In accounting terms, they are considered as cash.

Transaction accounts are known by a variety of descriptions, including a current account (British English), chequing account or checking account when held by a bank, share draft account when held by a credit union in North America. In the Commonwealth of Nations, United Kingdom, Hong Kong, India, Ireland, Australia, New Zealand, Singapore, Malaysia, South Africa and a number of other countries they are commonly called current or, before the demise of cheques, cheque accounts. Because money is available on demand they are also sometimes known as demand accounts or demand deposit accounts. In the United States, NOW accounts operate as transaction accounts.

Transaction accounts are operated by both businesses and personal users. Depending on the country and local demand economics earning from interest rates varies. Again depending on the country the financial institution that maintains the account may charge the account holder maintenance or transaction fees or offer the service free to the holder and charge only if the holder uses an add-on service such as an overdraft.

== History ==
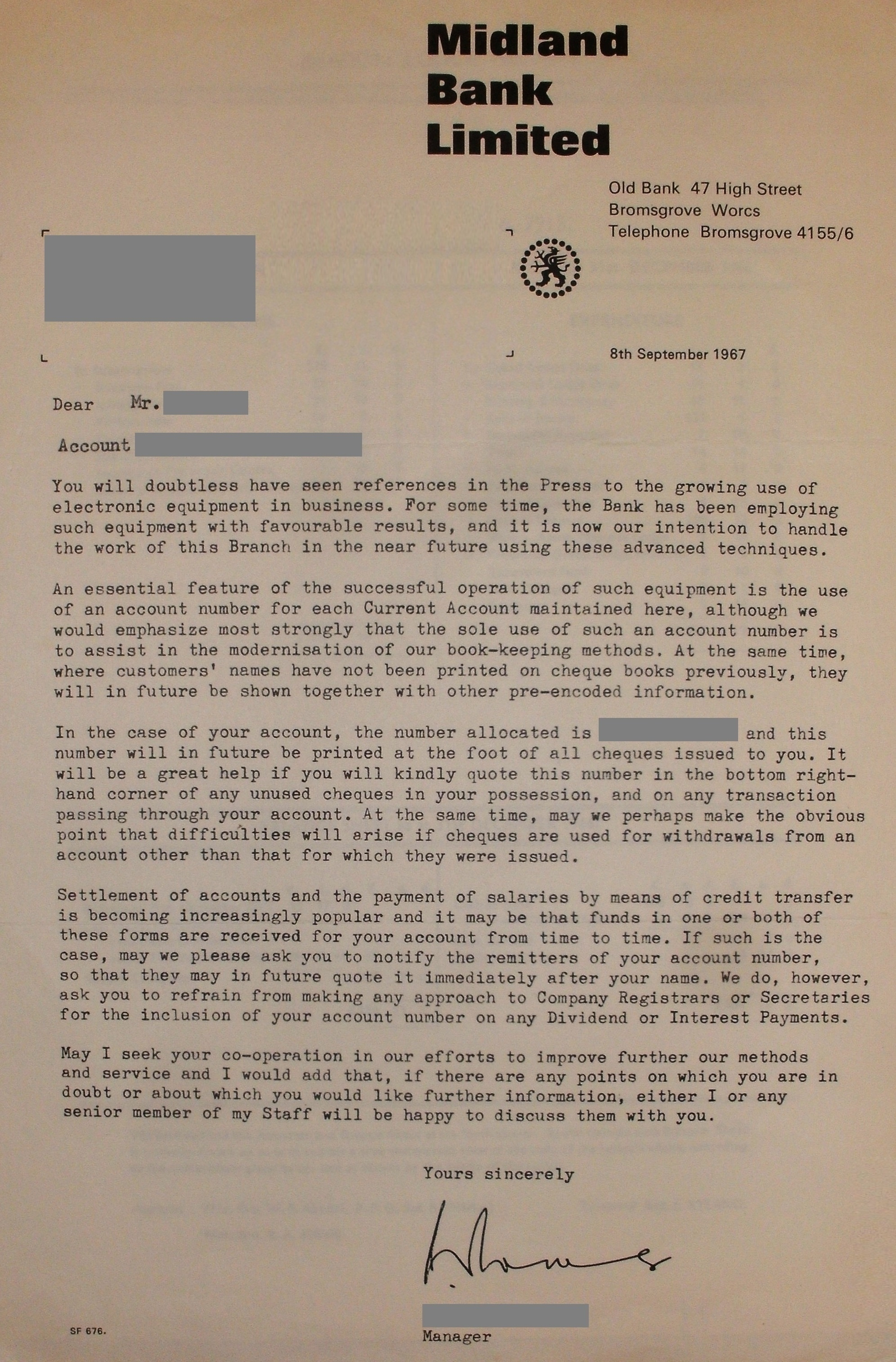
1967 letter by the Midland Bank to a customer, informing on the introduction of electronic data processing and the introduction of account numbers for current accounts

In Holland in the early 1500s, Amsterdam was a major trading and shipping city. People who had acquired large accumulations of cash began to deposit their money with cashiers to protect their wealth. These cashiers held the money for a fee. Competition drove cashiers to offer additional services, including paying out money to any person bearing a written order from a depositor to do so. They kept the note as proof of payment.

This concept spread to other countries including England and its colonies in North America, where land owners in Boston in 1681 mortgaged their land to cashiers who provided an account against which they could write checks.

In the 18th century in England, preprinted checks, serial numbers, and the word "cheque" appeared. By the late 18th century, the difficulty of clearing checks (sending them from one bank to another for collection) gave rise to the development of clearing houses.

== Features and access ==
The cheque was the traditional mode of payment for a transactional account.

All transaction accounts offer itemised lists of all financial transactions, either through a bank statement or a passbook. A transaction account allows the account holder to make or receive payments by:

- ATM cards (withdraw cash at any Automated Teller Machine)
- Debit card (cashless direct payment at a store or merchant)
- Cash (deposit and withdrawal of coins and banknotes at a branch)
- Cheque and money order (paper instruction to pay)
- Direct debit (pre-authorized debit)
- Standing order (automatic regular funds transfers)
- Electronic funds transfers (transfer funds electronically to another account)
- Online banking (transfer funds directly to another person via internet banking facility)

Banks offering transactional accounts may allow an account to go into overdraft if that has been previously arranged. If an account has a negative balance, money is being borrowed from the bank and interest and overdraft fees as normally charged.

== Country specific differences ==
In the United Kingdom and other countries with a UK banking heritage, transaction accounts are known as current accounts. These offer various flexible payment methods to allow customers to distribute money directly. One of the main differences between a UK current account and an American checking account is that they earn considerable interest, sometimes comparable to a savings account, and there is generally no charge for withdrawals at cashpoints (ATMs), other than charges by third party owners of such machines.

=== Transfer systems ===
Certain modes of payment are country-specific:

- Giro (funds transfer, direct deposit in European countries)
- In the United Kingdom, Faster Payments Service offers near immediate transfer, BACS offers giros that clear in a matter of days while CHAPS is done on the same day.
- Canada has an Interac e-Transfer service
- In India, NEFT and RTGS services are available to clear funds in a day.

=== In the European Union ===
The Regulation (EU) n. 655/2014 has introduced the European Account Preservation Order, a new procedure of asset freezing in order "to facilitate cross-border debt recovery in civil and commercial matters."

== Access ==
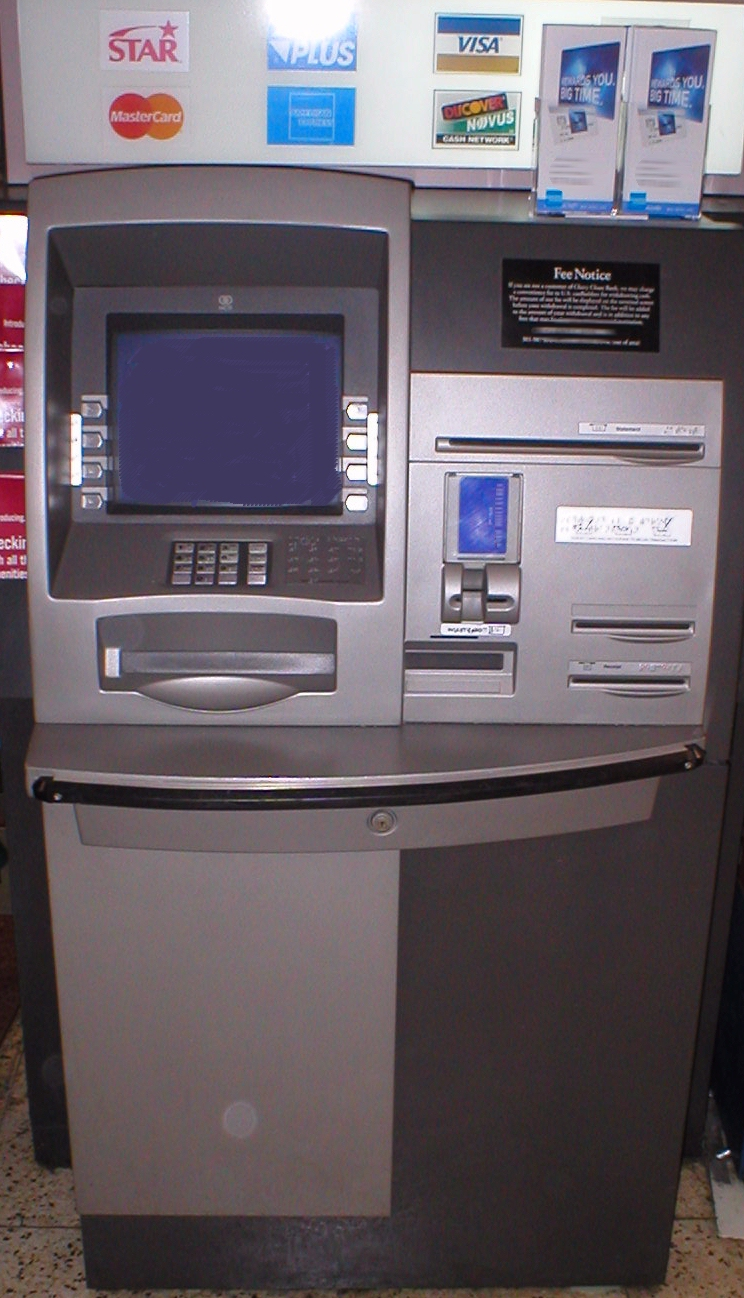
An Automated Teller Machine (ATM)

=== Branch access ===
Customers may need to attend a bank branch for a wide range of banking transactions including cash withdrawals and financial advice. There may be restrictions on cash withdrawals, even at a branch. For example, withdrawals of cash above a threshold figure may require notice.

Many transactions that previously could only be performed at a branch can now be done in others ways, such as use of ATMs, online, mobile and telephone banking.

=== Cheques ===
Cheques were the traditional method of making withdrawals from a transaction account.

=== Automated teller machines ===
Automated teller machines (ATMs) enable customers of a financial institution to perform financial transactions without attending a branch. This enables, for example, cash to be withdrawn from an account outside normal branch trading hours. However, ATMs usually have quite low limits for cash withdrawals, and there may be daily limits to cash withdrawals other than at a branch.

=== Mobile banking ===
With the introduction of mobile banking; a customer may perform banking transactions and payments, view balances and statements, and use various other services using their mobile phone. In the UK this has become the leading way people manage their finances, as mobile banking has overtaken internet banking as the most popular way to bank.

=== Internet banking ===
Internet or online banking enables a customer to perform banking transactions and payments, to view balances and statements, and various other facilities. This can be convenient especially when a bank is not open and enables banking transactions to be effected from anywhere Internet access is available. Online banking avoids the time spent travelling to a branch and standing in queues there. However, there are usually limits on the value of funds that can be transferred electronically on any day, making it necessary to use a cheque to effect such transfers when those limits are being reached.

=== Telephone banking ===
Telephone banking provides access to banking transactions over the telephone. In many cases telephone banking opening times are considerably longer than branch times.

=== Mail banking ===
A financial institution may allow its customers to deposit cheques into their account by mail. Mail banking can be used by customers of virtual banks (as they may not offer branches or ATMs that accept deposits) and by customers who live too far from a branch.

=== Stores and merchants providing debit card access ===
Most stores and merchants now have to accept debit card access for purchasing goods if they want to continue operating, especially now that some people only use electronic means of purchase.

== Cost ==
Any cost or fees charged by the financial institution that maintains the account, whether as a single monthly maintenance charge or for each financial transaction, will depend on a variety of factors, including the country's regulations and overall interest rates for lending and saving, as well as the financial institution's size and number of channels of access offered. This is why a direct bank can afford to offer low-cost or free banking, as well as why in some countries, transaction fees do not exist but extremely high lending rates are the norm. This is the case in the United Kingdom, where they have had free banking since 1984 when the then Midland Bank, in a bid to grab market share, scrapped current account charges. It was so successful that all other banks had no choice but offer the same or continue losing customers. Free banking account holders are now charged only if they use an add-on service such as an overdraft.

Financial transaction fees may be charged either per item or for a flat rate covering a certain number of transactions. Often, youths, students, senior citizens or high-valued customers do not pay fees for basic financial transactions. Some offer free transactions for maintaining a very high average balance in their account. Other service charges are applicable for overdraft, non-sufficient funds, the use of an external interbank network, etc. In countries where there are no service charges for transaction fees, there are, on the other hand, other recurring service charges such as a debit card annual fee. In the United States, there are checking account options that do not require monthly maintenance fees and this can keep costs down. While a majority of U.S. checking accounts do charge monthly maintenance fees, about one-third of accounts do not charge those fees. A survey of monthly checking account maintenance fees shows the average cost to be $13.47 per month or $161.64 per year.

== Interest ==
Unlike savings accounts, for which the primary reason for depositing money is to generate interest, the main function of a transactional account is transactional. Therefore, most providers pay little or no interest on credit balances.

Formerly, in the United States, Regulation Q (12 CFR 217) and the Banking Acts of 1933 and 1935 (12 USC 371a) prohibited a member of the Federal Reserve system from paying interest on demand deposit accounts. Historically, this restriction was frequently circumvented by either creating an account type such as a Negotiable Order of Withdrawal account (NOW account), which is legally not a demand deposit account or by offering interest-paying chequing through a bank that is not a member of the Federal Reserve system. The Dodd-Frank Wall Street Reform and Consumer Protection Act, however, passed by Congress and signed into law by President Obama on July 21, 2010, repealed the statutes that prohibit interest-bearing demand deposit accounts, effectively repealing Regulation Q (Pub. L. 111-203, Section 627). The repeal took effect on July 21, 2011. Since that date, financial institutions have been permitted, but not required, to offer interest-bearing demand deposit accounts.

In the United Kingdom, some online banks offer rates higher as many savings accounts, along with free banking (no charges for transactions) as institutions that offer centralised services (telephone, internet or postal based) tend to pay higher levels of interest. The same holds true for banks within the EURO currency zone.

=== High-yield accounts ===
High-yield accounts pay a higher interest rate than typical NOW accounts and frequently function as loss-leaders to drive relationship banking.

== Lending ==
Accounts can lend money in two ways: overdraft and offset mortgage.

=== Overdraft ===
An overdraft occurs when withdrawals from a bank account exceed the available balance. This gives the account a negative balance and in effect means the account provider is providing credit. If there is a prior agreement with the account provider for an overdraft facility, and the amount overdrawn is within this authorised overdraft, then interest is normally charged at the agreed rate. If the balance exceeds the agreed facility then fees may be charged and a higher interest rate might apply.

In North America, overdraft protection is an optional feature of a chequing account. An account holder may either apply for a permanent one, or the financial institution may, at its discretion, provide a temporary overdraft on an ad hoc basis.

In the UK, virtually all current accounts offer a pre-agreed overdraft facility the size of which is based upon affordability and credit history. This overdraft facility can be used at any time without consulting the bank and can be maintained indefinitely (subject to ad hoc reviews). Although an overdraft facility may be authorised, technically the money is repayable on demand by the bank. In reality this is a rare occurrence as the overdrafts are profitable for the bank and expensive for the customer.

=== Consumer reporting ===
In the United States, some consumer reporting agencies such as ChexSystems, Early Warning Services, and TeleCheck track how people manage their checking accounts. Banks use the agencies to screen checking account applicants. Those with low debit scores are denied checking accounts because a bank cannot afford an account to be overdrawn.

=== Offset mortgage ===
An offset mortgage was a type of mortgage common in the United Kingdom used for the purchase of domestic property. The key principle is the reduction of interest charged by "offsetting" a credit balance against the mortgage debt. This can be achieved via one of two methods: either lenders provide a single account for all transactions (often referred to as a current account mortgage) or they make multiple accounts available, which let the borrower notionally split money according to purpose, whilst all accounts are offset each day against the mortgage debt.

== See also ==
Transaction related

- Collection item
- Demand draft
- Error account a necessity for auditing transaction accounts
- Transaction deposit

Account type related

- Current account mortgage
- Negotiable order of withdrawal account
- Personal account
- Savings account
