= Regulation D (FRB) =

US financial regulation

Reserve Requirements for Depository Institutions (12 CFR 204, Regulation D) is a Federal Reserve regulation governing the reserves that banks and credit unions keep to satisfy depositor withdrawals. Although the regulation still requires banks to report the aggregate balances of their deposit accounts to the Federal Reserve, most of its provisions are inactive as a result of policy changes during the COVID-19 pandemic.

== Reserves ==
Until March 2020, Regulation D required depository institutions to keep a minimum amount of reserves in order to meet immediate withdrawals against their transaction accounts. The minimum reserve percentage was determined separately for each institution, starting at zero for small banks and increasing to 10% of transaction account deposits for the largest banks. An institution could satisfy the requirement with vault cash and with deposits at a Federal Reserve Bank, or a bank that acted as a Federal Reserve correspondent.

After the 2008 financial crisis, the Federal Reserve System began to adopt an "ample-reserves" approach, in which the Federal Reserve Banks pay their member banks interest on reserves deposited in excess of the reserve requirement. This system went into full force during the coronavirus pandemic and the reserve requirement was reduced to zero. The regulation allows reserve requirements to be reintroduced, but a more sophisticated regime based on the Basel III accord now governs bank liquidity.

== Savings transaction limit ==
Regulation D was known directly to the public for its former provision that limited withdrawals or outgoing transfers from a savings or money market account. No more than six such transactions per statement period could be made from an account by various "convenient" methods, which included checks, debit card payments, and automatic transactions such as automated clearing house transfers or electronic bill payment. Institutions were required to warn any customer that exceeded the limit and to freeze, close or reclassify accounts that did so repeatedly.

The limit on withdrawals was established during the Great Depression of the 1930s to help improve bank stability. It was amended in 2009 to allow greater freedom for the depositor. Beforehand, the limit was six withdrawals per month if the funds remained within the same institution (e.g., transfer to checking), but was only three drafts where the funds left the institution (e.g., check, ACH Network, or card based purchase).

The Federal Reserve discontinued the transaction limit in April 2020, stating that the elimination of required reserves had made the distinction between checking and savings accounts unimportant. Additionally, policies put in place during the coronavirus pandemic had increased depositors' reliance on convenient transfers. The Federal Reserve's action allowed banks to relax their limits on savings account withdrawals, but did not require them to do so.

== See also ==
- Savings account
- Money market account
