= Personal account =

Type of bank account

A personal account is a bank account for use by an individual for that person's own needs. It is a relative term to differentiate them from those accounts for business or corporate use.
