= Money market account =

Deposit account that pays interest

A money market account (MMA) or money market deposit account (MMDA) is a deposit account that pays interest based on current interest rates in the money markets. The interest rates paid are generally higher than those of savings accounts and transaction accounts; however, some banks will require higher minimum balances in money market accounts to avoid monthly fees and to earn interest.

Money market accounts should not be confused with money market funds, which are mutual funds that invest in money market securities.

== United States ==
=== Features ===
Money market accounts are regulated under terms similar to ordinary savings accounts. They are insured by the FDIC (unlike money market funds), and although they may provide checking services, the restrictions of Federal Reserve Regulation D have discouraged their use for day-to-day payment purposes. In practice, money market accounts are distinguished from ordinary savings accounts by their higher balance requirements and their more complex interest rate structure.

=== History ===
The Depository Institutions Deregulation and Monetary Control Act of 1980 set in motion a series of steps, designed to phase in the deregulation of bank deposits, permitting a wider variety of account types, and eventually eliminating interest ceilings on deposits. By the subsequent Garn–St. Germain Depository Institutions Act of 1982, on December 14, 1982, money market accounts were authorized with a minimum balance of no less than $2,500, no interest ceiling, and no minimum maturity, allowing up to six transfers out of the account per month (no more than three by check) and unlimited withdrawals by mail, messenger, or in person. Minimum denominations were eliminated on January 1, 1986, and the limitation that no more than three of the maximum six monthly outward transfers could be by check was eliminated on May 3, 1988.
