= Deposit account =

Bank holding into and from which money can be placed or withdrawn

A deposit account is a bank account maintained by a financial institution in which a customer can deposit and withdraw money. Deposit accounts can be savings accounts, current accounts or any of several other types of accounts explained below.

Transactions on deposit accounts are recorded in a bank's books, and the resulting balance is recorded as a liability of the bank and represents an amount owed by the bank to the customer. In other words, the banker-customer (depositor) relationship is one of debtor-creditor. Some banks charge fees for transactions on a customer's account. Additionally, some banks pay customers interest on their account balances.

== Types of accounts ==
SN	Account type	Description of account functionality
1	Transactional accounts	Also known as "current accounts" in Commonwealth countries and "checking accounts" in the United States. A deposit account for the purpose of securely and quickly providing frequent access to funds on demand, through various different channels. Because money is available on demand, these accounts are also referred to as "demand accounts" or "demand deposit accounts", except in the case of NOW (negotiable order of withdrawal) accounts, which are rare checking accounts that require a seven-day notice before withdrawals.
2	Money market account	A deposit account that pays interest at money market rates, and for which no notice or very short notice is required for withdrawals. In the United States, they are similar to checking accounts in that they offer check-writing privileges and instant access but they are subject to the same regulations as savings accounts, including monthly transaction limits.
3	Savings account	Accounts maintained by retail banks that pay interest but can not be used directly as money (for example, by writing a cheque or using a debit card at a point of sale), although cash can be withdrawn from these accounts at an automated teller machine. While they are not as convenient to use as checking accounts, these accounts generally offer consumers a higher rate of interest than a transactional account and will usually be linked to a transactional account.
4	Time deposit	Also known as a certificate of deposit in the United States. A money deposit at a banking institution that cannot be withdrawn for a preset fixed 'term' or period of time and will incur penalties for withdrawals before a certain date. When the term is over it can be withdrawn or it can be rolled over for another term. Generally speaking, the longer the term the higher the interest rate offered by the bank.
5	Call deposit	A deposit account that allows for the withdrawal of funds without penalty but requires a higher minimum balance to earn interest.
6	Sweep account	A deposit account in which amounts over a certain balance are automatically transferred to another account pursuant to a pre-determined set of arrangements.
7	Automatic transfer service account	A deposit account that allows the transfer of funds from a savings account to a checking account in order to cover a check written or to maintain a minimum balance.
8	Short term deposit account	An account where deposits are held for no longer than a year.

== How banking works ==
In banking, the verb "deposit" means a customer paying money into an account, and the verb "withdraw" means taking money out. From a legal and financial accounting standpoint, the noun "deposit" is used by the banking industry in financial statements to describe the liability owed by the bank to its depositor, and not the funds that the bank holds as a result of the deposit, which are shown as assets of the bank.

Subject to restrictions imposed by the terms and conditions of the account, the account holder (customer) retains the right to have the deposited money repaid on demand. The terms and conditions may specify the methods by which a customer may move money into or out of the account, e.g., by cheque, internet banking, EFTPOS or other channels.

For example, a depositor depositing $100 in cash into a checking account at a bank in the United States surrenders legal title to the $100 in cash, which becomes an asset of the bank. On the bank's books, the bank debits its cash account for the $100 in cash, and credits a "deposits" liability account for an equal amount. (See double-entry bookkeeping system.)

In the financial statements of the bank, the $100 in currency would be shown on the balance sheet as an asset of the bank and the deposit account would be shown as a liability owed by the bank to its customer. The bank's financial statement reflects the economic substance of the transaction, which is that the bank has borrowed $100 from its customer and has contractually obliged itself to repay the customer according to the terms of the agreement. These "physical" reserve funds may be held as deposits at the relevant central bank and will receive interest as per monetary policy.

Typically, a bank will not hold the entire sum in reserve, but will lend most of the money to other clients, in a process known as fractional-reserve banking. This allows providers to earn interest on the asset and hence to pay interest on deposits.

By transferring the ownership of deposits from one party to another, banks can avoid using physical cash as a method of payment. Commercial bank deposits account for most of the money supply in use today. For example, if a bank in the United States makes a loan to a customer by depositing the loan proceeds in that customer's checking account, the bank typically records this event by debiting an asset account on the bank's books (called loans receivable or some similar name) and credits the deposit liability or checking account of the customer on the bank's books. From an economic standpoint, the bank has essentially created economic money (although not legal tender). The customer's checking account balance has no banknotes in it, as a demand deposit account is simply a liability owed by the bank to its customer. In this way, commercial banks are allowed to increase the money supply (without printing currency).

== Regulations ==
Banking operates under a system of customs and conventions developed over many centuries. It is also normally subject to statutory regulations, such as reserve requirements developed to reduce the risk of failure of the bank. It may also have the purpose of reducing the extent of depositor losses in the event of bank failure.

To reduce the risk to depositors of a bank failure, some bank deposits may also be secured by a deposit insurance scheme, or be protected by a government guarantee scheme.

== See also ==
- Bank
- Capital market
- Ethical banking
