= Savings account =

Type of bank account

A savings account is a bank account at a retail bank. Common features include a limited number of withdrawals, a lack of checks and linked debit card facilities, limited transfer options and the inability to be overdrawn. Traditionally, transactions on savings accounts were widely recorded in a passbook, and were sometimes called passbook savings accounts, and bank statements were not provided; however, currently such transactions are commonly recorded electronically and accessible online.

People deposit funds in savings account for a variety of reasons, including a safe place to hold their cash. Savings accounts normally pay interest as well: almost all of them accrue compound interest over time. Several countries require savings accounts to be protected by deposit insurance and some countries provide a government guarantee for at least a portion of the account balance.

There are many types of savings accounts, often serving particular purposes. These may include accounts for young savers, accounts for retirees, Christmas club accounts, investment accounts, and money market accounts. Some savings accounts also have other special requirements, such as a minimum initial deposit, deposits made regularly, and notices of withdrawal.

== High yield savings accounts ==
High yield savings accounts, sometimes abbreviated to HYSA, are a type of savings account with higher interest rate than normal savings accounts. These accounts typically earn 10 times more in interest than a normal savings account. High yield savings accounts can be a good option for short-term investing.

== Regulations ==
=== United States ===
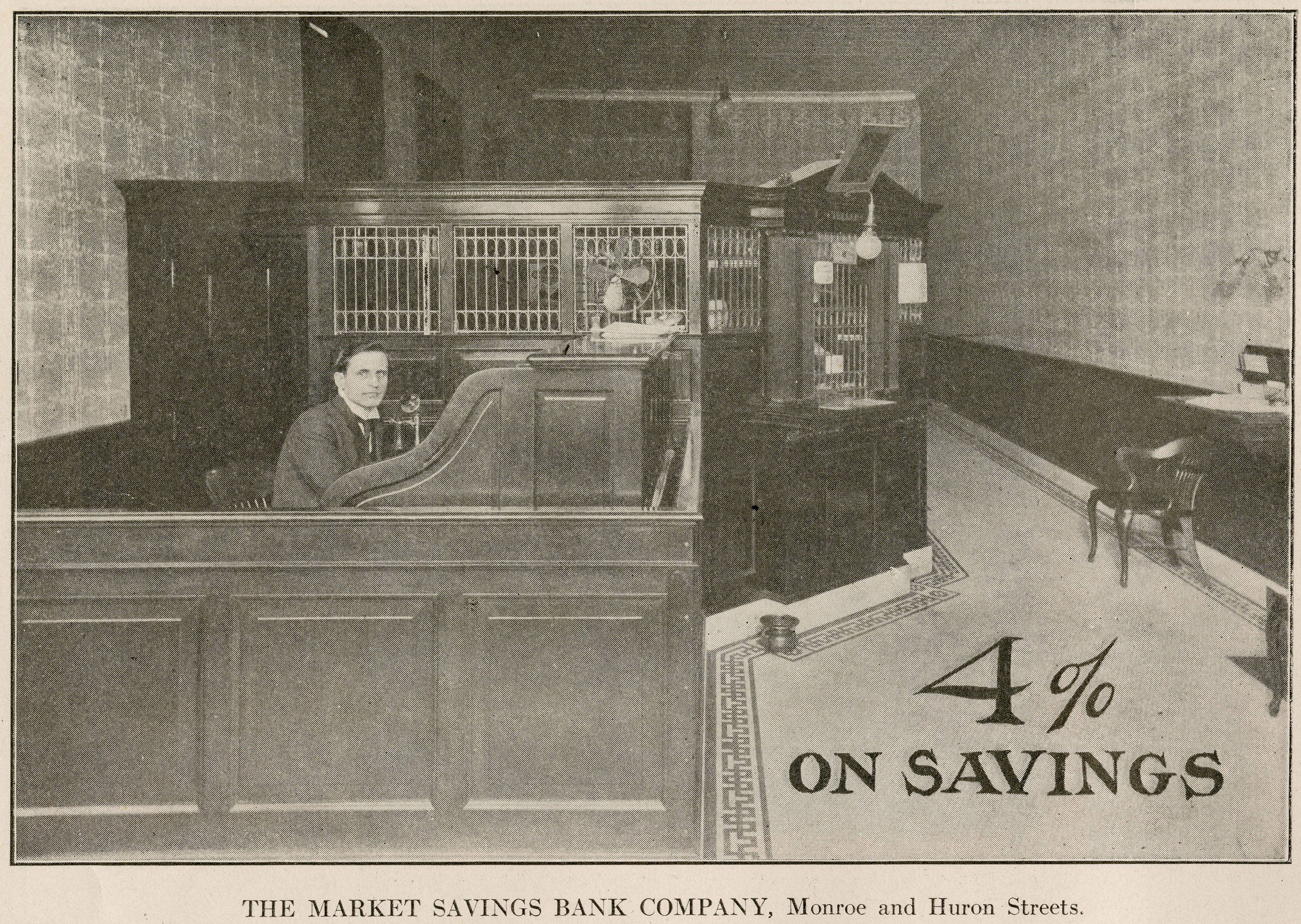
An advertisement for an early 20th century Toledo bank for a 4% interest rate on savings accounts

In the United States, Sec. 204.2(d)(1) of Regulation D (FRB) previously limited withdrawals from savings accounts to six transfers or withdrawals per month, a limitation which was removed in April 2020, though some banks continue to impose a limit voluntarily as of 2021. There is no limit to the number of deposits into the account. Violations of the regulation may result in a service charge or may result in the account being changed to a checking account.

Regulation D sets smaller reserve requirements for savings account balances. In addition, customers can plan withdrawals to avoid fees and earn interest, which contributes to more stable savings account balances on which banks can lend. A savings account linked to a checking account at the same financial institution can help avoid fees due to overdrafts and reduce banking costs.

=== India ===
Savings accounts are very popular in India, and almost 80% of the population have one, with many having multiple savings accounts. The reserve bank has also introduced Basic Savings Bank Deposit Account which has certain limits, but allows customers to start a bank account with no minimum balance.

They were not popular among common people until the 1920s. Savings accounts did not exist at most banks in India for a lot of time. People relied primarily on fixed deposits for preserving their savings. Canara Bank (earlier Canara Banking Corporation Limited) introduced the concept of a savings account in 1920, with a set of very rigid rules. If a customer wanted to, he could deposit a minimum of ₹1, and a maximum of ₹1000. They were not allowed to carry a balance beyond ₹2000. They had to give a notice of three days to the bank to be able to withdraw their money. The banks also enjoyed the freedom to fix the interest rate on deposits on the lowest credit balance of any one day of each month.

Banks found innovative ways of adding to their income from savings accounts. For every passbook, which was an essential physical book that the customers update to keep a record of all account transactions, the customers were asked to pay 25 paise. It is now usually given free of cost. For some time, the rate of interest on the balance in the savings account in Indian banks was regulated by the Reserve Bank of India. However, the bank can now keep any rate of interest they deem fit.

Banks have to follow the RBI's know your customer guidelines to allow an individual to open a savings account.

Almost every bank deposit in India is insured by the Deposit Insurance and Credit Guarantee Corporation (DICGC), to a maximum of ₹5,00,000 or their deposit amount, whichever is lower.

== See also ==
- Bank rate
