= Max Townley =

British politician (1864-1942)

Member of Parliament for Mid Bedfordshire
- In office 14 December 1918 – 26 October 1922
- Preceded by: Arthur Black
- Succeeded by: Frederick Linfield

Personal details
- Born: 22 June 1864 Fulbourn
- Died: 12 December 1942 (aged 78)
- Parent: Charles Watson Townley (father)
- Education: Eton College
- Alma mater: Trinity College, Cambridge
- Occupation: Agent, agriculturist, politician

Maximilian Gowran Townley (22 June 1864 – 12 December 1942) was a British land agent, agriculturist and politician. He served one term in Parliament as a Conservative, and later campaigned for policies to support agriculture. At the end of his life he chaired the River Great Ouse Catchment Board, where he attempted to prevent damage to Fenland farms caused by regular flooding.

== Early life ==
Townley was the fifth son of Charles Watson Townley, who was Lord Lieutenant of Cambridgeshire from 1874 to 1893, and was born at Fulbourn. He attended Eton College and Trinity College, Cambridge. He went into business as a land agent to Lord St John of Bletso based in Melchbourne near Sharnbrook in Bedfordshire. In 1908 he was appointed as a Justice of the Peace of the county of Bedfordshire. He was also chairman of Norfolk Estuary Company.

In September 1911, Townley was unanimously adopted as the Conservative candidate for Wisbech or North Cambridgeshire division, a seat held narrowly by Hon Neil James Archibald Primrose for the Liberal Party. However, when Primrose was killed during the First World War, the Conservative Association felt obliged to endorse the Liberal candidate Colin Coote by the terms of the electoral pact. During the war, Townley was a temporary Major in the Remount Service, attached to General Headquarters.

== Parliament ==
Townley was adopted as Conservative candidate for Mid Bedfordshire on 18 November 1918, where he received the Coalition Coupon in opposition to Sir Arthur Black, incumbent MP for Biggleswade who was a Liberal supporter of H. H. Asquith. He won the seat with a majority of 1,721, In Parliament, Townley concentrated on agricultural issues on which he had professional knowledge; he was a member of a delegation from the Agriculture Committee of the House of Commons to see the prime minister in July 1919.

When the Agriculture Bill was before Parliament in 1920, Townley defended the inclusion of a clause giving compensation to agricultural tenants for disturbance by their landlords, arguing it would not harm any good landlord. He made it clear that his commitment to agriculture dominated other issues, joining a protest in July 1921 against the government's Corn Production Acts (Repeal) Bill which removed subsidy. Townley asked rhetorically what the government intended to do with ex-servicemen who had been encouraged to go into farming, and whether it was better "to spend money on British agriculture than to seek to make Palestine a land fit for Hebrews to live in?" He was within the mainstream of the Conservative Party in general, not joining with the right-wing in seeking to limit spending. He opposed making British Summer Time permanent.

== Defeat ==
At the 1922 general election Townley lost his seat by 2,737 votes to Frederick Linfield of the Liberal Party. He retained his interest in politics and in November 1923 he was adopted as Conservative candidate for Isle of Ely (the successor to Wisbech) where the sitting MP Col Norman Coates was standing down although threatening to stand as an "Independent Agricultural" candidate. Coates eventually decided not to stand, but Townley lost to the Liberal Henry Mond by 467 votes. In June 1924 Townley was co-opted as a member of the Grand Council of the Primrose League.

== Later life ==
Townley became involved with the Central and Associated Chambers of Agriculture, becoming chairman of its council in 1922 when still a Member of Parliament. He later became chairman of its policy committee, and regularly commented on agriculture policy issues in public. He pressed for fixed prices for wheat, and applauded when Stanley Baldwin endorsed the policy in 1930. When the Land Drainage Act 1930 created 39 catchment boards for the main rivers, Townley was appointed to that for the River Great Ouse. In 1936 he was chairman of the executive council of the Catchment Boards Association.

== Fen flood ==
In March 1937 there was a severe flood of the Great Ouse, requiring the armed forces to be called out to save lives. After the flood Townley complained that the rateable value of the area of the catchment board was so low that the cost of the works would be crippling, and called for Government help. Under his chairmanship but against his advice, the Catchment Board decided in January 1938 that it could no longer finance their projected outfall scheme to relieve flooding. Townley denied that the board was in conflict with the Ministry of Agriculture which had agreed to finance 95% of the scheme, remarking that not even that Ministry could over-rule the Treasury.

== Family ==
Townley married Hon Ellen Sydney St John, daughter of St Andrew St John, 16th Baron St John of Bletso. In July 1941 they left Heydon, Cambridgeshire to live in Monadh Liath near Aviemore in Inverness-shire. He died there on 12 December 1942 aged 78.

Parliament of the United Kingdom
Preceded by Sir Arthur Black for Biggleswade	Member of Parliament for Mid Bedfordshire; 1918 – 1922	Succeeded by Frederick Linfield
