= James de Rothschild =

James de Rothschild may refer to:

- James de Rothschild (politician) (1878–1957), French-born British politician and philanthropist
- James Mayer de Rothschild (1792–1868), German-French banker

== See also ==
- Rothschild family
