= Atmah (yacht) =

1898 motor yacht

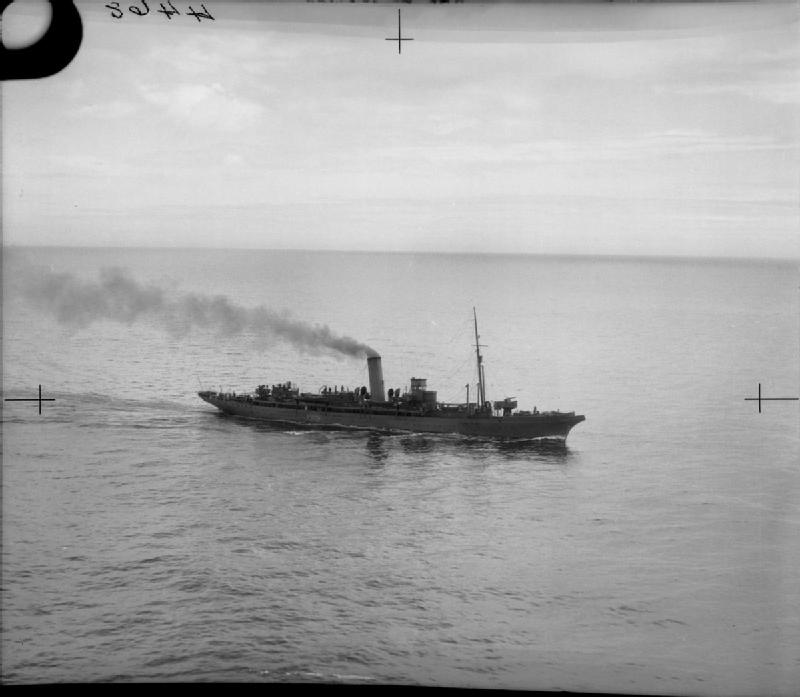
- Atmah during World War II

History
- Name: Atmah
- Owner: Baron Edmond James de Rothschild
- Builder: Fairchilds, Govan, Glasgow
- Completed: 1898
- Fate: Broken up 1950

General characteristics as built
- Type: Yacht
- Length: 88.2 m (289 ft 4 in)

Atmah was the personal yacht of Baron Edmond James de Rothschild.

Atmah was built by Fairchilds in Govan, Glasgow in 1898, and was 88.2 metres (289 ft 4 in) long, lengthened to 91.6 metres (300 ft 6 in) in 1901, and based in Le Havre. During World War I she was on active service for the British Admiralty.

In 1940, ownership based to James Armand de Rothschild, and the ship was used by the Admiralty during the war. In 1947, she was bought by Chagris Steamship Co Ltd (Goulandris Bros), London, and converted to a passenger ship and renamed Aegean Star, before being broken up in La Spezia at the end of 1950.
