= 1894 Wisbech by-election =

UK Parliamentary by-election

The 1894 Wisbech by-election was held on 3 April 1894 after the incumbent Liberal MP, Arthur Brand was appointed as Treasurer of the Household. The seat was retained, won by Brand, although he would lose the seat again in the next year's general election.

Wisbech by-election, 1894
Party	Candidate	Votes	%	±%
Liberal	Arthur Brand	4,363	50.8	+0.1
Conservative	S G Stopford-Sackville	4,227	49.2	−0.1
Majority		136	1.6	+0.2
Turnout		8,590	81.7	+9.5
Liberal hold		Swing	+0.1	
