= 1917 Wisbech by-election =

UK parliamentary by-election

The 1917 Wisbech by-election was a by-election held on 14 December 1917 for the British House of Commons constituency of Wisbech in Cambridgeshire.

== Vacancy ==
Neil Primrose

The election was caused by the death of sitting Liberal MP, the Hon. Neil Primrose MC, the son of the former Liberal prime minister Lord Rosebery on 15 November 1917. Primrose died of wounds received in battle at Gezer during the Sinai and Palestine Campaign.

== Candidates ==
The Liberals selected Colin Coote, a serving officer in the Gloucestershire Regiment who was granted leave to contest the election. Being their partners in the coalition government of David Lloyd George, the Unionists also supported Coote’s nomination and no other candidates came forward.

== Result ==
Accordingly, Coote was returned unopposed. At 24 years of age, he was one of the youngest members of the House.

Colin Coote

Wisbech by-election, December 1917: Wisbech
Party	Candidate	Votes	%	±%
National Liberal	Colin Coote	Unopposed	N/A	N/A
National Liberal hold				

== See also ==
- List of United Kingdom by-elections (1900–1918)
