= Cecil Beck =

British politician (1876-1932)

Sir Cecil Beck

Member of Parliament for Saffron Walden
- In office 19 December 1910 – 15 November 1922
- Preceded by: Douglas Proby
- Succeeded by: Sir William Foot Mitchell

Member of Parliament for Wisbech
- In office 8 February 1906 – 10 February 1910
- Preceded by: Arthur Brand
- Succeeded by: Neil Primrose

Personal details
- Born: Arthur Cecil Tyrrell Beck; 3 December 1876
- Died: 22 March 1932 (aged 55)
- Party: Liberal

Sir Arthur Cecil Tyrrell Beck (3 December 1876 – 22 March 1932) was a British Liberal Party politician.

== Background ==
He was born in Bloemfontein South Africa and was the son of Arthur William Beck and Annie Tyrrell. He was educated at Haileybury and Jesus College, Cambridge. In 1922 he married Lillian Clare Charteris Rickards. They had no children.

== Professional career ==
In 1898 he qualified as a Barrister and was called to bar at Lincoln's Inn, but he never practised. He did serve as a Justice of the peace. He was an Under-writer at Lloyds.

== Political career ==
From 1905 to 1906 he served as Mayor of St Ives, Huntingdonshire. He was Liberal candidate for the Wisbech division of Cambridgeshire at the 1906 General Election. It was already a Liberal seat and he comfortably held it in that election;

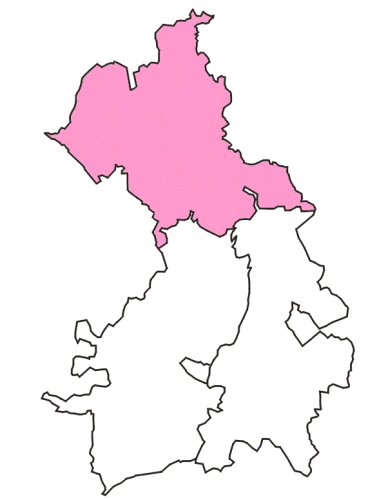
Wisbech in Cambridgeshire 1906

General election 1906: Wisbech
Party	Candidate	Votes	%	±%
Liberal	Cecil Beck	5,125	55.7	+4.7
Conservative	T C Garfit	4,080	44.3	−4.7
Majority		1,045	11.4	
Turnout		9,205	83.4	+6.7
Liberal hold		Swing	+4.7	

He only served for one parliament as MP when the Liberals replaced him as their candidate for the January 1910 General Election. He managed to find another seat to contest, the Conservative seat of Chippenham in Wiltshire. Chippenham's Conservative MP since 1892 had joined the Liberals in 1904 and had retained his seat as a Liberal in 1906. He had since taken a seat in the House of Lords and Beck was given the tough job of trying to hold the seat. He was unsuccessful. Another General election came along in December 1910 and Beck tried his luck with a different constituency, Saffron Walden in Essex. This was a traditional Liberal seat that had been marginally lost to the Conservatives at the January 1910 elections. Beck narrowly regained the seat;

Cecil Beck

General election December 1910: Saffron Walden
Party	Candidate	Votes	%	±%
Liberal	Cecil Beck	4,071	50.2	+1.8
Conservative	Douglas Proby	4,031	49.8	−1.8
Majority		40	0.4	3.6
Turnout			88.2	−2.1
Liberal gain from Conservative		Swing	+1.8	

In parliament he started off his governmental career in 1912 working as Parliamentary Private Secretary for Percy Illingworth who was the Parliamentary Secretary to the Treasury. In 1912 he became Chairman of the Liberal Insurance Committee. Also in 1912 he was appointed one of the Commissioners on the Royal Commission of Inquiry into methods of appointment in the Civil Service. He was made a Lord of the Treasury in the Liberal government of H.H. Asquith in February 1915, then was appointed Vice-Chamberlain of the Household on the formation of the wartime coalition government in May 1915. He continued in this post until June 1917, when he was appointed one of the Parliamentary Secretaries and Controller of Finance to the Ministry of National Service. He was one of the minority of Liberal MPs who agreed to continue serving in the Coalition Government when David Lloyd George took over as prime minister. When the 1918 General Election came along, as an office holder in the Coalition Government, Beck received the endorsement of Lloyd George and had no Unionist opponent, making his re-election easy;

General election 1918: Saffron Walden
Party	Candidate	Votes	%	±%
Liberal	Cecil Beck	10,628	70.1	
Labour	James Joseph Mallon	4,531	29.9	
Majority		6,097	40.2	
Turnout			47.8	
Liberal hold		Swing		

The National Service Ministry was abolished in December 1919. Beck was knighted in the 1920 New Year Honours. In August 1921 Beck resigned the Coalition Whip to join the Independent Parliamentary Group, a new right wing group led by Horatio Bottomley. Beck intended to contest a London constituency rather than defend his seat at the 1922 General Election, but he did not stand for parliament again.

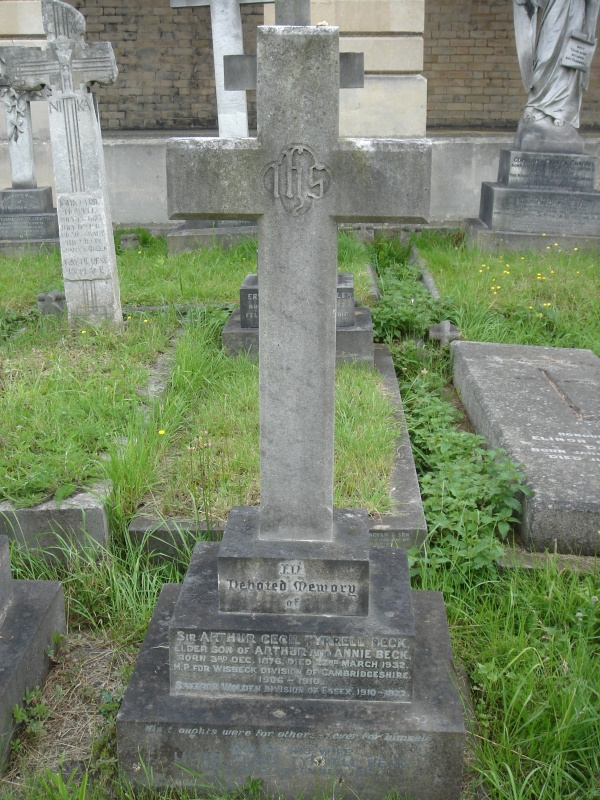
Funerary monument, Brompton Cemetery, London

Beck died in London on 22 March 1932, aged 55, and is buried in Brompton Cemetery, London.

Parliament of the United Kingdom
Preceded by Arthur Brand	Member of Parliament for Wisbech; 1906 – 1910	Succeeded by Hon. Neil Primrose
Preceded by Douglas Proby	Member of Parliament for Saffron Walden; 1910 – 1922	Succeeded by Sir William Foot Mitchell
Political offices
Preceded by Geoffrey Howard	Vice-Chamberlain of the Household; 1915–1917	Succeeded by William Dudley Ward
