= Grimble =

1968 children's book by Clement Freud

- Cover of the 1968 edition
- Author: Clement Freud
- Illustrator: Frank Francis; Quentin Blake
- Language: English
- Publisher: Collins
- Publication date: 1968
- Publication place: England
- Pages: 44
- Followed by: Grimble at Christmas

Grimble is a children's book by Clement Freud, published by Collins in 1968. A sequel, Grimble at Christmas, was published some years later. The book was illustrated by Frank Francis. In the 1970s, the two titles were published in a compendium volume by Puffin Books, with drawings by Quentin Blake. Grimble at Christmas was reissued by Cape for Christmas 2008.

== From the dust jacket ==
"What would you do if:

you did not have a fixed birthday?
your parents usually communicated with you by notes?
you came home from school on Monday to find that your parents had gone, without warning, to Peru?"

== Plot ==
Grimble is a boy of "about 10" who has parents that can be described as eccentric. Returning from school one day, he discovers that they have gone to Peru for a week leaving him with a fridge filled with bottles of tea, an oven filled with sandwiches, a tin full of sixpence pieces and a list of five names and addresses of people he can visit to get help with dinner. Each day he visits a new address, though on each occasion his host is out. The book is a humorous account of his life alone for five days.

== Grimble in popular culture ==
The book was read on the BBC children's television show Jackanory, and (according to the dust jacket) Freud received 23,500 letters about the work, including 64 letters of complaint from domestic science teachers who thought the book disgraceful.

J. K. Rowling, Neil Gaiman and Lauren Child have cited the work as being a favourite book of theirs.

In 2005 it was reprinted in the anthology Noisy Outlaws, Unfriendly Blobs, and Some Other Things That Aren't as Scary, Maybe, Depending on How You Feel About Lost Lands, Stray Cellphones, Creatures from the Sky, Parents who Disappear in Peru, a Man Named Lars Farf, and One Other Story We Couldn't Quite Finish, So Maybe You Could Help Us Out to raise money for the youth writing center 826NYC.
