= Anglo-American Peace Centenary =

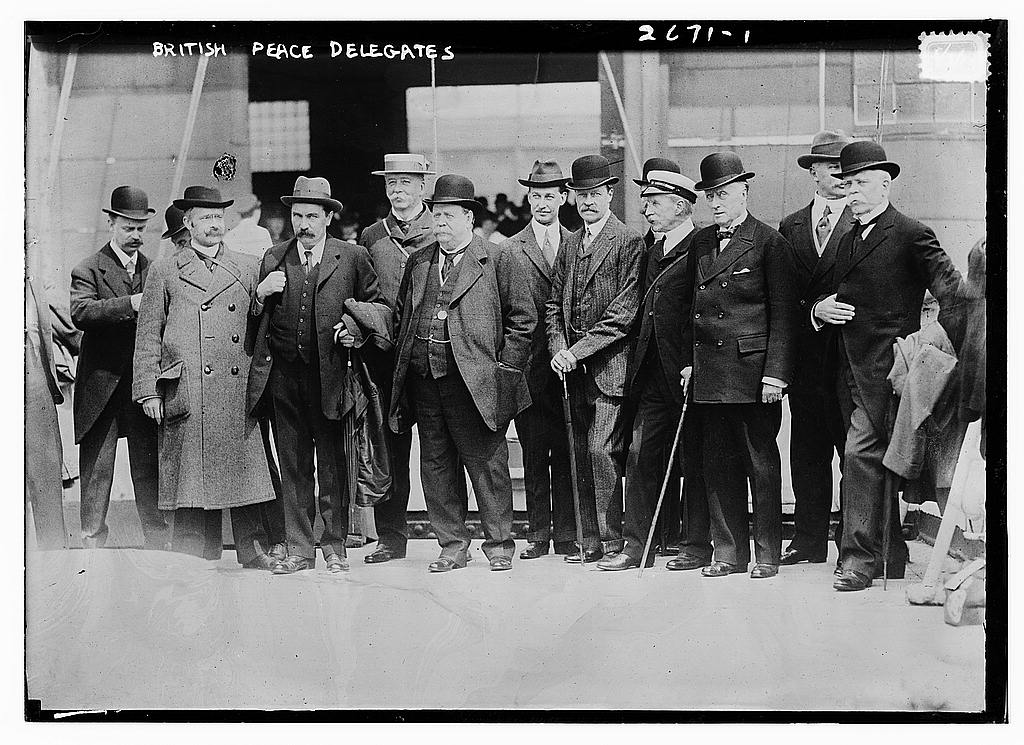

Anglo-American Peace Centenary (1814–1914) was in 1914 to celebrate the lasting peace between Britain and the United States. They last fought in the War of 1812, and those hostilities were ended formally on December 24, 1814, with the signing of the Treaty of Ghent.

== History ==
Planning for the centenary began in 1913 when the delegates from Great Britain and the British Colonies came to the United States to arrange with the American committee for the celebration. They planned to establish a series of scholarships for women based on the Rhodes Scholarship, at Girton College and Newnham College (both part of Cambridge University) and Bedford College, London. There was an exposition at Shepherd's Bush to celebrate "progress in arts, sciences and industries".

== British delegates ==
- Sir Arthur Lawley
- Charles Thomas Mills
- Neil James Archibald Primrose

== American delegates ==
- Andrew Carnegie
