= Hugh Lucas-Tooth =

Scottish Conservative politician (1903–85)

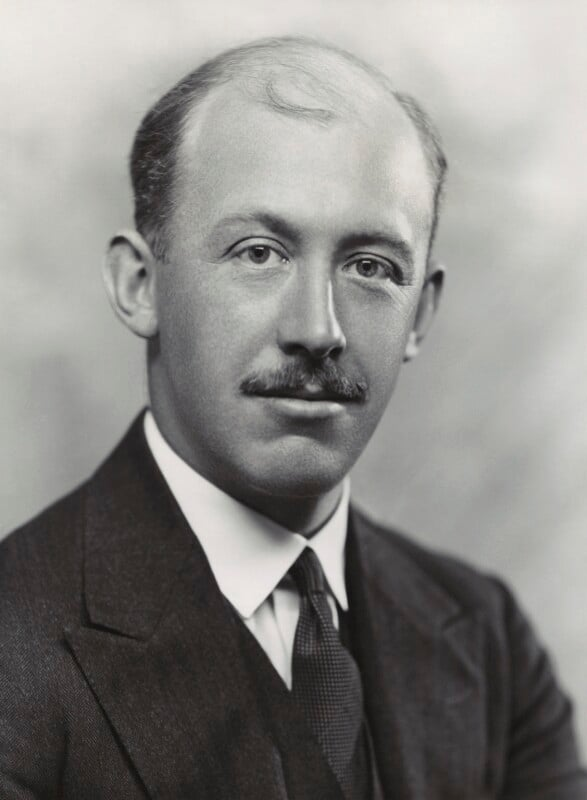
Munro-Lucas-Tooth in 1936

Sir Hugh Vere Huntly Duff Munro-Lucas-Tooth, 1st Baronet (13 January 1903 – 18 November 1985), born and baptised Hugh Vere Huntly Duff Warrand and known as Sir Hugh Vere Huntly Duff Lucas-Tooth, 1st Baronet, from 1920 to 1965, was a Scottish Conservative politician. Elected to parliament in 1924 at the age of 21, he was the first British MP to have been born in the 20th century.

== Family ==
Warrand's father was Hugh Munro Warrand (8 July 1870 – 11 June 1935, married 24 April 1901), Major in the 3rd Battalion of the Queen's Own Cameron Highlanders, and son of Alexander John Cruikshank Warrand of Bught, Inverness-shire.

Warrand's mother, Beatrice Maude Lucas Lucas-Tooth (died 25 June 1944), was a daughter of Sir Robert Lucas-Tooth, 1st Baronet. Warrand's great-grandfather was Robert Tooth, a prominent Australian businessman. His brother, Selwyn John Power Warrand (6 February 1904 – 24 May 1941), who married 25 March 1933 to Frena Lingen Crace, daughter of Everard Crace, from Canberra, Australian Capital Territory, by whom he had two children.

Selwyn John Power Warrand was a Commander in the service of the Royal Navy, fought in World War II and was killed in action on board of HMS Hood (51) and his widow remarried in 1947 Henry Richard Charles Humphries. His sister, Beatrice Helen Fitzhardinge Warrand (born 1908), married on 27 September 1941 another World War II veteran, Lieutenant Colonel Lyndall Fownes Urwick, Military Cross, Officer of the Order of the British Empire, son of Sir Henry Urwick of Malvern, Worcestershire, Justice of the Peace.

== Biography ==
Warrand was educated at Eton College, and graduated from Balliol College in 1924 with a Bachelor of Arts degree. He adopted the legally changed name Hugh Vere Huntly Duff Lucas-Tooth of Teanich by Royal Licence in 1920 when he gained, at the age of seventeen, the recreated baronetcy of his maternal grandfather, the first baronet, whose three sons had died in World War I, being created 1st Baronet Lucas-Tooth, of Bught, County Inverness, in the Baronetage of the United Kingdom on 1 December 1920, with special remainder to the heirs male of the body of his mother.

Lucas-Tooth was first elected to the House of Commons in the 1924 general election as Conservative Member of Parliament for the Isle of Ely from October 1924 to May 1929. Aged 21, he became the youngest MP, known as "Baby of the House". He served as Parliamentary Private Secretary to Arthur Samuel, Secretary for Overseas Trade. Lucas-Tooth was called to the bar in 1933 at Lincoln's Inn entitled to practise as a barrister. He also became a lieutenant colonel in the service of the Queen's Own Cameron Highlanders.

During the 1930s Lucas-Tooth helped established the Lucas-Tooth gymnasium at Tooley Street in south London for the benefit of unemployed men from the Northern coalfields and unemployed areas. A new style of physical exercises helped improve the fitness of these men. It was featured in a British Pathe newsreel in 1938 titled 'Fit – Fitter – Fittest'.

He was defeated in the 1929 general election by the Liberal candidate, James A. de Rothschild. Lucas-Tooth stood again for parliament in the 1945 general election for Hendon South, and was elected, taking his seat in July 1945. He retained the seat in subsequent general elections until 1970 and was Parliamentary Under-Secretary of State for the Home Department between February 1952 and December 1955.

On 3 February 1965 Lucas-Tooth legally changed his name once again by Deed Poll to Hugh Vere Huntly Duff Munro-Lucas-Tooth of Teaninich, to reflect the Scottish lairdship Munro of Teaninich.

He retired from Parliament at the 1970 general election.

== Marriage and issue ==
He married on 10 September 1925 Laetitia Florence Findlay (died 1978), daughter of Sir John Ritchie Findlay, 1st Baronet, of Aberlour; the couple had three children, Laetitia (born 1926), Jennifer (born 1929), and Hugh (born 1932). Hugh succeeded his father as Baronet.

Parliament of the United Kingdom
Preceded by Henry Mond	Member of Parliament for Isle of Ely; 1924–1929	Succeeded by James de Rothschild
New constituency	Member of Parliament for Hendon South; 1945–1970	Succeeded by Peter Thomas
Preceded by Charles Rhys	Baby of the House; 1924–1929	Succeeded by Jennie Lee
Political offices
Preceded by David Llewellyn	Under-Secretary of State for the Home Department; 1952–1955; With: David Llewellyn 1952; The Lord Lloyd 1952–1954; The Lord Mancroft 1954–1955	Succeeded by The Lord Mancroft
Baronetage of the United Kingdom
New creation	Baronet (of Bught); 1920–1985	Succeeded by Hugh John Lucas-Tooth
