= 1891 Wisbech by-election =

UK Parliamentary by-election

The 1891 Wisbech by-election was held on 23 July 1891 after the incumbent Conservative MP, Charles William Selwyn retired due to poor health. He had previously informed his local Conservative Association that his health would not allow him to undertake a contested election. and he died in 1893.

The seat was won by the Liberal candidate Arthur Brand.

Wisbech by-election, 1891
Party	Candidate	Votes	%	±%
Liberal	Arthur Brand	3,979	51.7	+9.2
Conservative	S W Duncan	3,719	48.3	−9.2
Majority		260	3.4	N/A
Turnout		7,698	65.7	−10.4
Liberal gain from Conservative		Swing	+9.2	
