= 1973 Isle of Ely by-election =

UK parliamentary by-election

The 1973 Isle of Ely by-election was a parliamentary by-election held on 26 July 1973 for the British House of Commons constituency of Isle of Ely.

The by-election took place during the 1970s Liberal Party revival. This seat and Ripon were gained on the same day, the third and fourth Liberal gains during the Parliament. This was the first time since 1899 that the Liberal Party had made two by-election gains on the same day when it won both seats in a two-member constituency at the Oldham by-election. The last time the party had gained two seats in different constituencies on the same day was on 2 June 1896, at the Frome and the Wick Burghs by-elections.

== Previous MP ==
The seat had become vacant on the death of the constituency's Member of Parliament (MP), Major Sir Harry Legge-Bourke KBE (16 May 1914 – 21 May 1973). Legge-Bourke, a Conservative, had gained the seat from the Liberal Party in the 1945 general election.

== Candidates ==
Three candidates were nominated. The list below is set out in descending order based on the number of votes received at the by-election.

The Liberal Party candidate was Clement Freud. He was the grandson of Sigmund Freud and a well-known writer and broadcaster.

Freud won the by-election in a seat his party had not contested in the 1970 general election. He maintained the constituency until it was renamed in 1983, with most of the territory incorporated into the constituency of North East Cambridgeshire. Freud retained that seat until he was defeated in the 1987 general election.

The Conservative candidate was J. B. Stevens, who had contested Birmingham Stechford in the 1970 general election. Stevens again lost to Clement Freud in Ely, at the February 1974 general election.

The Labour Party was represented by B. A. Young.

== Result ==
1973 by-election: Isle of Ely
| Party | Candidate | Votes | % | ±% |
|---|---|---|---|---|
| Liberal | Clement Freud | 17,390 | 38.3 | New |
| Conservative | J. B. Stevens | 15,920 | 35.0 | −24.9 |
| Labour | B. A. Young | 12,153 | 26.7 | −13.4 |
| Majority | | 1,470 | 3.3 | N/A |
| Turnout | | 45,463 | 65.8 | −6.1 |
| Registered electors | | 69,069 | | |
| Liberal gain from Conservative | | Swing | +31.6 | |

== See also ==
- Isle of Ely constituency
- List of United Kingdom by-elections
- United Kingdom by-election records
