= Dermot Freyer =

Irish author and activist

Dermot Johnston Freyer (29 July 1883 – 11 January 1970) was an Irish author who also spent time as a political activist in Britain.

Freyer was born in Moradabad in India, where his father, Peter, was serving in the Indian Medical Service. He was largely brought up in Dublin, and he was educated at Wellington College, then attended Trinity College, Cambridge, followed by the University of Edinburgh, where he studied medicine. Before graduating from Edinburgh, he met Oliver St John Gogarty, who convinced him to leave the university and focus on writing. He spent some time as a reader for Charles Elkin Mathews, and in this role, he rejected James Joyce's Dubliners, describing two of its stories as "almost obscene".

In Edinburgh, Freyer met New Zealand-born Lorna Doone, although she contracted tuberculosis and was advised to return to New Zealand. Freyer moved to Cambridge and was soon joined by Doone, the two marrying in 1909. During 1912, Freyer served as joint editor of Granta, despite not being a student at the time. He fell out with his co-editor, Denis Garstin, but was given a say in appointing the next editor, Edward Shanks. Despite Lorna spending much time away due to poor health, the couple had three children: Patrick, who became an architect, Grattan, who founded a pottery, and Michael, who became a hotel manager.

Freyer joined the London Irish Rifles in 1905 and served with them throughout World War I, apparently based in London and given charge of fitting soldiers' uniforms. Despite this, he was promoted to major. In 1919, Lorna died in the Spanish flu epidemic.

Freyer also joined the Labour Party, for which he was elected to the Cambridge City Council. He stood for Parliament on numerous occasions, without success: in Huntingdonshire at the 1922 United Kingdom general election, the Isle of Ely in 1924 and 1929, and Hitchin at the 1931 United Kingdom general election.

In 1932, Freyer wrote the semi-autobiographical novel, Not All Joy. In 1934, he moved to Achill Island off the west coast of Ireland, purchasing the house that had once belonged to Charles Boycott. He converted it into a hotel and on Sundays, held song and dance events, open to all. He ran it on a haphazard basis, not charging guests who were short of money, but charging extra to anyone who did not take a daily bath. By 1964, he was running out of money and sold the hotel, returning to Cambridge.

Freyer had three sons. Freyer's sister Kathleen married Colonel John Duncan Grant VC, a British Indian Army officer.

Freyer died early in 1970 and was buried at Grantchester Church, near Cambridge.
