= Arthur Watson (journalist) =

British newspaper editor

- Born: Arthur Ernest Watson; 29 February 1880; Newcastle upon Tyne, England
- Died: 18 September 1969 (aged 89)
- Education: Alleyn's School
- Alma mater: Rutherford College of Technology; University of Durham
- Employer: The Daily Telegraph

Arthur Ernest Watson (29 February 1880 – 18 September 1969) was a British newspaper editor, known for editing The Daily Telegraph from 1924 to 1950.

== Biography ==
Watson was born in Newcastle upon Tyne on 29 February 1880, the second son of Aaron Watson, author and journalist, and his wife, Phebe. He attended Alleyn's School in Dulwich, Rutherford College of Technology in Newcastle, and Armstrong College of the University of Durham, before entering journalism. After a spell with the Newcastle Daily Leader, he joined The Daily Telegraph in 1902. He was with the newspaper for the remainder of his career, although he served during World War I as an acting Major in the Royal Field Artillery. He became the Telegraph's Assistant Editor in 1923, and was appointed Editor the following year, serving until 1950. He was also active in the Institute of Journalists, and in retirement was the President of the Mitcham and Morden Conservative Association.

Media offices
Preceded by Frederick Miller	Editor of The Daily Telegraph; 1924–1950	Succeeded by Colin Coote
