= Charles Tyrrell Giles =

British lawyer and politician

Giles in 1895

Sir Charles Tyrrell Giles KC (2 February 1850 – 16 January 1940), was a British lawyer and Conservative politician who represented Wisbech.

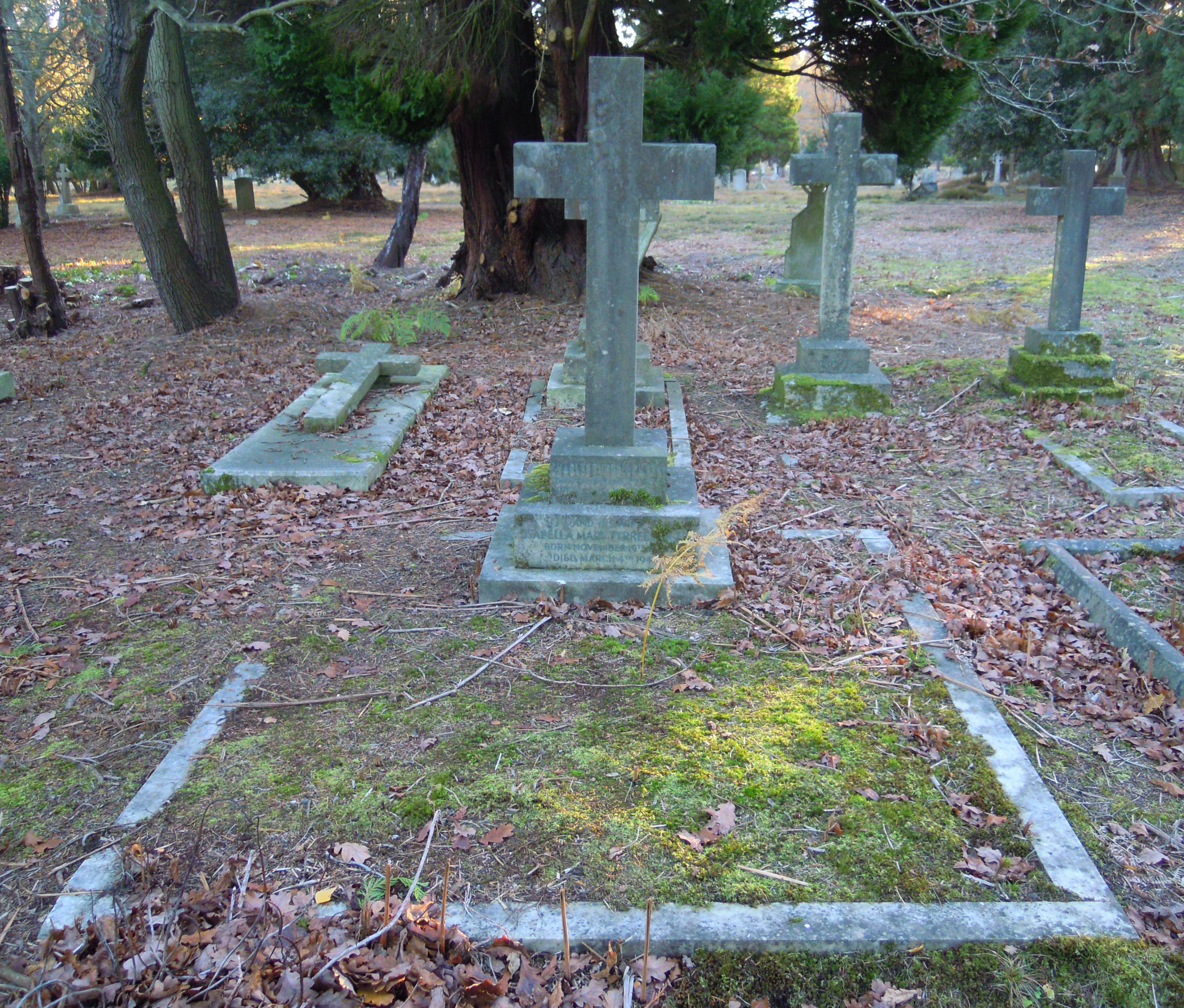
Grave of Charles Tyrrell Giles in Brookwood Cemetery

Giles was the son of Alfred Giles MP for Southampton. Educated at Harrow School and King's College, Cambridge Giles qualified as a barrister in 1874 and was Chairman of the Wimbledon Petty Sessions (1906–1917). He became member of parliament for Wisbech in the 1895 general election, but lost it in the 1900 General Election. He contested his father's old seat of Southampton in 1910. Between 1907 and 1925 he served as Alderman of Surrey County Council and was High Sheriff of Surrey (1915–1916). He was appointed King's Counsel and knighted in 1922. He was Chairman of the Wimbledon and Putney Commons Conservators from 1892 until his death.

In 1881, Giles married Isabella Mary (19 November 1856 – 4 March 1949), daughter of Jeremiah Colman, of Carshalton Park, Surrey, of the famous mustard manufacturing family; her brother was Sir Jeremiah Colman, 1st Baronet.

Giles lived at Copse Hill House Wimbledon. He died at the age of 89, after a long illness, at Gatton Park, Surrey, the home of his brother-in-law, Sir Jeremiah Colman. He is buried in Brookwood Cemetery.

== Notes ==
Parliament of the United Kingdom
Preceded by Arthur Brand	Member of Parliament for Wisbech; 1895–1900	Succeeded by Arthur Brand
