= Harry Legge-Bourke =

British Army officer and politician (1914–1973)

Major Sir Harry Legge-Bourke KBE

Chairman of the 1922 Committee
- In office 1970–1972
- Preceded by: Arthur Vere Harvey
- Succeeded by: Edward du Cann

Member of Parliament for Isle of Ely
- In office 5 July 1945 – 21 May 1973
- Preceded by: James de Rothschild
- Succeeded by: Clement Freud

Personal details
- Born: Edward Alexander Henry Legge-Bourke; 16 May 1914 Windsor, Berkshire, England
- Died: 21 May 1973 (aged 59) London, England
- Party: Conservative
- Spouse: Catherine Jean Grant (m. 1938)
- Children: 3
- Education: Eton College

Sir Edward Alexander Henry Legge-Bourke (16 May 1914 – 21 May 1973) was a British Conservative politician, and a Member of Parliament for Isle of Ely from 1945 until his death in 1973.

== Early life ==
Legge-Bourke was born as the only child of Walter Legge-Bourke (1889–1914), who was killed in action in World War I in October 1914, and Victoria Alexandrina Wynn-Carington.

He served alongside Jock Colville (his half–second cousin (Note: Both were great-grandsons of Robert Carrington, 2nd Baron Carrington.)) as a Page of Honour from 1926. Educated at Eton College and the Royal Military College, Sandhurst, Legge-Bourke was commissioned into the Royal Horse Guards in 1934. He served there throughout the World War II, rising to the rank of major. In 1941, he was liaison officer, GHQ, British Forces in Greece, and served with the 7th Armoured Division at El Alamein.

== Politics ==
Legge-Bourke was elected Member of Parliament for the Isle of Ely in 1945 as a member of the Conservative Party. His gain from the Liberal incumbent, James de Rothschild, was one of the few Conservative gains of the election. In 1954, he resigned his membership of the official Conservative party and sat as an independent conservative member for a period. In 1960, he was invested as a KBE. As an East Anglian representative, he was particularly interested in land drainage and was vice-President of the Association of Drainage Authorities. A popular local MP (he was made a Freeman by Wisbech Municipal Borough in 1973), he instructed Prime Minister Clement Attlee to "Change the bloody record" as he threw a coin at him – an incident which had him briefly debarred from the Commons. As an MP, Legge-Bourke was a vocal supporter of the Palestinian and Arab cause, describing Zionism as "a menace to world peace" and referring to the establishment of the state of Israel as "an act of aggression on those who lived in Palestine." Legge-Bourke chaired the 1922 Committee of Conservative backbenchers from 1970 to 1972, when he resigned due to poor health.

== Family ==
Legge-Bourke married Catherine Jean Grant, daughter of Grant baronets and Evelyn Alice Lindsay Wood. They had three children.

He inherited a 1/20th of the Lord Great Chamberlainship of England. His granddaughter Alexandra "Tiggy" Legge-Bourke was nanny to Princes William and Harry, sons of the later King Charles III, during their childhoods.

Legge-Bourke died at his home in London on 21 May 1973, aged 59, after an operation for a stomach tumour. The by-election to replace him was won by Liberal Clement Freud. Legge-Bourke and his wife were cremated and their ashes buried in Ely Cathedral.

== Notes and references ==
=== References ===
Parliament of the United Kingdom
Preceded by James de Rothschild	Member of Parliament for Isle of Ely; 1945–1973	Succeeded by Clement Freud
Political offices
Preceded by Sir Arthur Vere Harvey	Chairman of the 1922 Committee; 1970–1972	Succeeded by Sir Edward du Cann
