= Norman Coates =

British politician (1890–1966)

Lieutenant-Colonel Norman Coates MC (27 April 1890 – 21 March 1966) was a British army officer, School Head Master, and briefly a Conservative politician. First employed as a trainee accountant, he was given a commission when he enlisted in the first month of the First World War. He was wounded in action at Gallipoli and then served in senior staff officer roles. In civilian life he established a public school for the sons of Army Officers, and was elected to Parliament but lived well beyond his means and was made bankrupt – disclosing his highly dubious financial practices. He rebuilt his life again in the world of private education.

Volunteering for service again in the Second World War, he was given an appointment organising Prisoner of War camps at the War Office where he ruffled feathers with other departments but played his role in ensuring the safety and survival of Rudolf Hess. He was dismissed as part of a major clear-out of his Directorate and subsequently convicted of a criminal offence; his disgrace meant that he disappeared from public life.

== Accountancy training ==
Coates was the son of Thomas Coates, a master builder who was an Alderman and Justice of the Peace in Durham; he was educated at Durham School and at King's College, Durham. He was employed as a clerk for the County Accountant for County Durham; Coates was employed with a view to taking articles although he did not do so. After two or three years at Durham he moved to Truro where he worked in the office of the County Accountant for Cornwall on the accounts of the Education department for a year before moving to a similar appointment at Cardiff earning £140 annually.

== War service ==
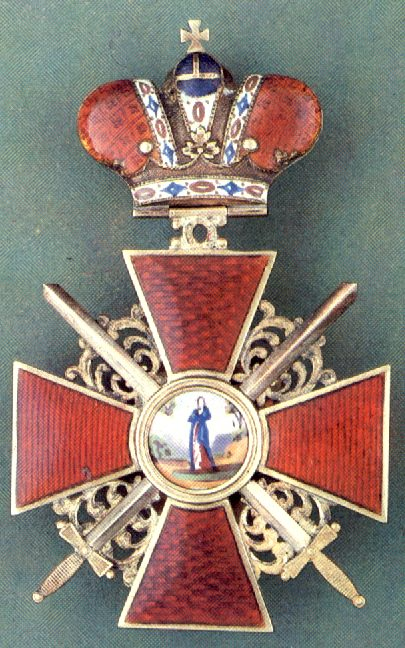
Medal of the Order of St. Anne, 2nd class, awarded to Coates in 1915

Coates later claimed to have joined the army's Royal Warwickshire Regiment in 1911; on the outbreak of World War I he served full-time in the Army beginning as an Adjutant in the 4th Battalion, the Welsh Regiment. He received a commission as Second Lieutenant on 2 September 1914. Promoted the next January to be a temporary Lieutenant, his battalion was sent to Gallipoli in the summer of 1915. Coates was wounded in action at Gallipoli, when the battalion participated in the landing at Suvla Bay between 9 August and 15 August.

After recovering Coates became a Staff Captain to Sir Archibald Murray and went with Murray to the war in Egypt. He was Deputy Assistant Adjutant General to the Desert Column in 1916, then Deputy Assistant Adjutant and Quartermaster General to the Desert Mounted Corps in 1917. Later that year he became Aide-de-camp to Field Marshal The Duke of Connaught. By the end of the war he was Assistant Quartermaster General to the Cavalry. In 1919 he became Assistant Adjutant General at General Headquarters of the Egyptian Expeditionary Force and was also Military Secretary to Lord Allenby. In the King's Birthday honours list of 3 June 1918 Coates was awarded the Military Cross in connection with the war in Egypt. He was mentioned in despatches and received the Order of St Anne of Russia in 1915; he was a Brevet Major by the end of the war. At the time of his political career he was a Lieutenant-Colonel in the Royal Warwickshire Regiment Reserve of Officers.

== Post-war career ==
In the 1918 general election, Coates (described as an "ardent Conservative") was adopted as Conservative candidate for Bethnal Green North East; however he did not in the end fight the election after the boat returning him to Britain arrived too late. After the end of the war he continued in the Army as Assistant Adjutant-General at the headquarters of the Egyptian Expeditionary Force in 1919, and then Military Secretary to Lord Allenby. Leaving the army in September 1919, he held a special appointment at the War Office from 1920 to 1928, a form of volunteer reserve.

== Palestine War Memorial ==
Coates became the representative of the Palestine Memorial Committee in London, raising funds from friends of the Egyptian Expeditionary Force to build a cenotaph in Palestine in memory of those who had fallen in battle. In December 1919 Lord Treowen criticised the proposed design and site of the memorial as a desecration of the Mount of Olives; Coates defended the choice of both and referred Treowen's letter to Field Marshal Lord Allenby. Treowen responded by questioning Coates' methods as "not those which carry conviction or inspire confidence". Coates then corresponded privately, and persuaded Treowen to retreat and state that he was not motivated by any personal feelings against Coates.

The Zionist Organisation decided to give a grant of £100, noting that the memorial was non-sectarian. By the beginning of March 1920, the fund based at 70 Finsbury Pavement reported having received £11,200 11s. in total.

== United Services College ==
While still at the War Office Coates had established his own company, Coates and Company, with the intention of carrying on foreign exchange banking. He had stationery printed with the logo "Coates and Company, bankers", but the company had no capital and did no actual business.

Coates established the United Services College, a public school for the sons of officers and ex-officers, in Hurst, Berkshire in 1920 despite having no previous experience as a schoolmaster; he later explained that he knew the requirements of young officers proceeding in the Army. In order to found the school, he used £2,000 available to him as executor of the will of a fellow Army officer he had met in Egypt; Coates claimed to have the consent of Mrs Grieve, the sole legatee of the will who allowed him to use the money for any purpose. After six months at Hurst, the school (which was successful in attracting students) moved to Binfield. In March 1922 the school moved to Bray where Coates was granted a seven-year lease on Bray Court which was set in 50 acres (200,000 m^{2}) of land.

Advertisements for the United Services College identified its visitor as the Marquess of Carisbrooke GCVO, and the Chairman as Bishop Shaw, and claimed three pupils had secured entrance to the University of Cambridge in 1922 as well as two to Sandhurst. Coates styled himself as the Commandant of the school.

== 1922 election ==
When the Lloyd George coalition collapsed, precipitating a sudden general election in the autumn of 1922, Isle of Ely Conservative Association had no candidate in place. The sitting Member of Parliament Colin Coote had been elected unopposed as a Coalition Liberal with their support in the previous election, but was now fighting as a Liberal candidate prepared to give the Conservative government only qualified support. When the Association's executive met at March on 25 October 1922, a motion to endorse Coote was defeated by 11 votes to 3, and a motion to adopt a Conservative candidate was carried. Some local names were mentioned as possible candidates, as well as General Townshend. At a further meeting at the Regent Theatre in March on 30 October, a telegram from Capt Powell from Conservative Central Office was read out:

General Townshend declines. Col. Norman Coates, previously stood for another constituency, would stand. Has knowledge of agriculture, aged 32, married, Church of England, fluent speaker, good war record, would receive our support if adopted by local Association.

The information concerning Townshend turned out to be incorrect but his acceptance was received too late. Coates was duly adopted as the Association's candidate, styling himself as "The Conservative and Agricultural Candidate". During the campaign Coates told a public meeting at the Guyhim Schoolroom on 7 November that he was "out for no axe to grind, except the axe of agriculture". In his campaign Coates pledged to bring about "real reductions in tea, beer and tobacco" by lowering duties on them.

== Parliamentary contribution ==
The return to the Writ, formally declaring that Norman Coates had been elected to Parliament.

When the election result was declared at 2:30 PM on 16 November, Coates was successful, benefitting from a split in the vote between Coote and the Labour candidate. His majority was much larger than anyone had expected. However, there was a rumour a fortnight after the election that Coates would resign his seat to allow Sir Arthur Griffith-Boscawen, a Conservative Minister unexpectedly defeated in the general election to return; Coates disclaimed any knowledge and Griffith-Boscawen continued looking.

He was active in parliament, promoting the interests of potato farmers in the constituency and opposing government agricultural policy. In particular he sought the ending of potato imports, the provision of credit to farmers and the decrease in rates charged by railways for transporting agricultural produce.

== Leaving Parliament ==
At a concert organised by the Wisbech Conservative Association at the Alexandra Theatre on 3 October 1923, the Chairman of the Association announced that he had received a letter from Coates announcing his intention not to seek re-election. Coates stated that "with my other private affairs", the constituency was too big to allow him enough time for his private interests "which of course I must, in duty bound, protect even more so than my political interests". He went on to write that he could not stand as an Independent Conservative candidate but could be an Independent Agricultural candidate, while claiming that he had been offered an alternative constituency which would not require so lengthy tours. He finished by stressing that he was not retiring from politics. The local newspaper commented that Coates had failed to live up to the promises made at the time of the election, "promises of agricultural meetings, explanations of agricultural policy, did not reach fruition. Local appointments were not fulfilled, and often came the explanatory telegram, which caused disappointment".

The next general election came soon after when Stanley Baldwin sought a mandate to impose protectionist tariffs. Coates had to decide whether to pursue his putative Independent candidacy and arrived in Ely on 12 November, to find that rumours about "other reasons for the break" were current. He said that he would meet supporters over the weekend of 17–18 November 1923 in Whittlesey. However he instead telephoned the Falcon Hotel to say that he was not coming as he had learned that the Conservative Association had a new candidate (Max Townley was selected) and would withdraw.

== Bankruptcy ==
Coates continued as Commandant of the United Services College after entering Parliament. However, in February 1924 his creditors issued a petition for his bankruptcy stating that he was a member of the Bath Club in London but that "his present residence or place of business the Petitioners are unable to obtain". When Coates was tracked down, he was clearly insolvent and an examination in public was ordered. The details of Coates' financial dealings were uncovered at two hearings at Windsor Bankruptcy Court at the Windsor Guildhall in July and October 1924. It was immediately apparent and acknowledged by Coates that financial troubles were the reason for the end of his Parliamentary career.

For the first examination Coates prepared a statement of affairs claiming that his debt was only £314 8s. 2d., but his claimed principal asset was the lease "and goodwill" of the United Services College. The Trustee in bankruptcy noted that the valuation had increased since the preliminary examination and disputed its correctness. Coates also admitted that he had not told Mrs Grieve that he used money willed to her to start a school, and had to admit that the school had not paid its way. Mrs Grieve's representative accused Coates of having told Mrs Grieve that the money from the will had been invested in stocks and bonds when in fact he had been transferring it to his own overdrawn account.

The Official Receiver tackled Coates over £1,000 paid to him by the Imperial War Graves Commission in the interests of the Palestine War Memorial Fund, which had not yet been built. Coates admitted he received the money and that no memorial had been built, but insisted that he was entitled to keep it as payment for services rendered to the fund. He stated that it was his expenses as a Member of Parliament, renting a flat in London and visiting his constituency, which had led to his running out of ready money, as a result of which he had gone to moneylenders and ended up owing £1,836 to them. He had known he was insolvent for over a year.

At the second hearing Coates was questioned about his lifestyle and accepted that he had that year gone to the Derby, to Lord's and to Henley. He usually stayed in expensive hotels and had gone to Switzerland for a fortnight over Christmas 1923 with two boys from the school. He had also adopted a boy after persuading the boy's mother that her son was to be a beneficiary in Coates' will; the items in the will conveyed to the boy were all known to be worthless or nonexistent. Coates was indeed made bankrupt; creditors received only 8.25d per £ (3.4%). The trustee in bankruptcy was discharged on 23 September 1925.

== Subsequent life ==
After his bankruptcy Coates moved to Chichester, where later in 1924 he established the Chichester School and named himself as Head Master, implying a connection to the University of Durham. Coates remained in Chichester until 1931 when he moved to Colchester, and then to Great Wratting in Suffolk.

== Second World War ==
On 4 September 1939 he was granted an emergency commission as a Second Lieutenant in the Royal Army Service Corps. He was soon placed at the War Office headquarters, and joined the Directorate of Prisoners of War when it was established on 25 May 1940; a simultaneous policy decision removed the responsibility for civilian internment under Defence Regulation 18B from the War Office to the Home Office, although the War Office retained responsibility for staffing them and for discipline. In June 1940, Coates announced that there was room for 10,000 internees after all the Italian citizens had been rounded up and that there would be an additional 6,000 places for internees after the first ships had left for Canada where some were being sent. Later in the summer Coates was appointed Deputy Director for Prisoners of War, responsible for administration of all branches of the department.

One characteristic of Coates' approach as Deputy Director was defending the directorate from other departments. When the Home Office pressed to take over managing the internment camps in August 1940, Coates' superior, Director of Prisoners of War Sir Alan Hunter, wrote a memo defending the War Office position and strongly criticising the Home Office for failing to recruit civilian staff and free up soldiers for the war effort. The response of Home Office official Sir John Moylan was that Hunter's memo was based on "a suggestio falsi which convinces me that this letter must have been drafted by Col Coates". At the end of April 1941, Coates wrote to the Foreign Office official in charge of Prisoners of War, W.St.C.H. Roberts, to stress the War Office's vigilance in ensuring that the British Red Cross Society and the Order of St John did not speak out on matters which were under War Office control.

=== Rudolf Hess ===
When Rudolf Hess was taken into British custody in 1941, Col A. Malcolm Scott was appointed as Commandant of 'Camp Z' which had been set up specially to hold him, and reported to Coates. On 29 May, Scott passed on the news that the doctor assigned to Hess believed his patient was "definitely over the border that lies between mental instability and insanity". Coates quickly arranged for psychiatrist J.R. Rees to go to relieve the doctor. Hess attempted suicide in the early hours of 16 June, and Scott wrote to Coates that day to explain what had happened. When Rees saw Hess a few days after, he wrote to Coates that Hess was growing more delusional. When MI5 discovered a putative plot by Polish exiles to break into Camp Z at Mytchett Place and kidnap or murder Hess, Coates saw Director of Counter-Espionage Guy Liddell and arranged to take MI5 officer Edward Hinchley-Cooke to the Camp to inform Col Scott.

== Departure ==
By Autumn 1941 the Directorate of Prisoners of War at the War Office had "all the trappings of a major bureaucratic machine". However all the leading members of the Directorate including Coates, his superior Sir Alan Hunter, Inspector Sir Oswald Borrett and Capt W. Rosser James were removed in September 1941. General Sir Alan Hunter was succeeded by Major-General E.C. Gepp as Director of Prisoners of War. On 20 April 1942, having been convicted of a criminal offence, Coates was removed from the Army. Coates' entries in Who's Who and Kelly's Handbook to the Titled, Landed and Official Classes ceased at or shortly after this time and his date of death is not recorded.

He died on 21 March 1966 aged 75 and is buried in the churchyard of St Llawddog's Church, Llanllawddog, Carmarthenshire.

Coates' medals, including his Military Cross, 1914 Star, British War and Victory medals, and the Order of St Anne 2nd Class, were sold in 1977.

Parliament of the United Kingdom
| Preceded by Colin Coote | Member of Parliament for Isle of Ely; 1922–1923 | Succeeded by Henry Mond |
