= Clement Freud =

English politician and media personality (1924–2009)

Sir Clement Freud
- Freud in 1970
- Born: Clemens Rafael Freud; 24 April 1924; Berlin, German Reich
- Died: 15 April 2009 (aged 84); London, England
- Occupations: Broadcaster; chef; MP; writer
- Political party: Liberal
- Spouse: Jill Flewett (m. 1950)
- Children: 5, including Matthew and Emma
- Parent: Ernst L. Freud (father)
- Relatives: Freud family

Member of Parliament North East Cambridgeshire Isle of Ely (1973–1983)
- In office 27 July 1973 – 18 May 1987
- Preceded by: Henry Legge-Bourke
- Succeeded by: Malcolm Moss

Lord Rector of the University of St Andrews
- In office November 2002 – October 2005
- Preceded by: Andrew Neil
- Succeeded by: Kevin Dunion

Military service
- Years of service: 1942–1947
- Rank: Second lieutenant

Sir Clement Raphael Freud (24 April 1924 – 15 April 2009) was a British broadcaster, writer, politician and chef. The son of Ernst L. Freud and grandson of Sigmund Freud, Clement moved to the United Kingdom from Nazi Germany as a child and later worked as a prominent chef and food writer.

He became known to a wider audience as a television and radio personality. Freud was the longest serving panellist on the BBC Radio 4 panel show Just a Minute, appearing in each of the first 143 episodes, and making subsequent regular appearances up until his death in 2009.

Freud was elected as a Liberal Member of Parliament in 1973, retaining his seat until 1987, when he received a knighthood.

In 2016, seven years after his death, three women made public allegations of child sexual abuse and rape by Freud, which led to police investigations.

== Early life ==
Clement Freud was born Clemens Rafael Freud in Berlin, the son of Jewish parents Ernst L. Freud (an architect) and Lucie Freud (née Brasch). He was a grandson of psychoanalyst Sigmund Freud and the brother of artist Lucian Freud. His family fled to the United Kingdom from Nazi Germany and his forenames were anglicised to Clement Raphael. He spent his later childhood in Hampstead, where he attended the Hall School, a prep school. He was then educated at two independent schools: at Dartington Hall School, where he boarded, and at St Paul's School in London. He was naturalised as a British subject on 4 September 1939, three days after the outbreak of the Second World War.

During the war, Freud joined the Royal Ulster Rifles and served in the ranks, acting as an aide to Field Marshal Montgomery. He later worked at the Nuremberg Trials, and in 1947 was commissioned as an officer. Freud married June Flewett (the inspiration for Lucy Pevensie in C. S. Lewis's children's series The Chronicles of Narnia) in 1950, and the couple had five children. Flewett had taken the stage name Jill Raymond in 1944, and after her husband's knighthood, was known as Lady Freud. Freud became an Anglican at the time of his marriage.

== Early career ==
Freud was one of Britain's first celebrity chefs. He worked at the Dorchester Hotel and went on to run his own restaurant in Sloane Square at a relatively young age. Freud appeared in a series of dog food television advertisements (at first Chunky Meat, later Chunky Minced Morsels) in which he co-starred with a bloodhound called Henry (played by a number of dogs) which shared his trademark "hangdog" expression. In 1964 he appeared in Strictly for the Birds. In 1968 he wrote the children's book Grimble, followed by a sequel, Grimble at Christmas, six years later. Whilst running a nightclub, Freud met a newspaper editor who gave him a job as a sports journalist. From there he became an award-winning food and drink writer, writing columns for many publications.

== Political career ==
Freud stood in the 1973 Isle of Ely by-election, becoming the Liberal Member of Parliament for that constituency (later North East Cambridgeshire) from 1973 to 1987. In 1983, to support employment in his constituency, he assisted the management buy-out of a concrete pipe manufacturer in March, Cambridgeshire, led by Tom Moore, and became an investor in the resulting March Concrete Ltd. His departure from Parliament was marked by the award of a knighthood.

In his column in the Racing Post of 23 August 2006, Freud wrote about his election to Parliament in a by-election: "Politically, I was an anti-Conservative unable to join a Labour party hell-bent on nationalising everything that moved, so when a by-election occurred in East Anglia, where I lived and live, I stood as a Liberal and was fortunate in getting in. Ladbrokes quoted me at 33–1 in this three-horse contest, so Ladbrokes paid for me to have rather more secretarial and research staff than other MPs, which helped to keep me in for five parliaments."

His autobiography, Freud Ego, recalls his election win, and shortly after, when asked by his wife Jill, "Why aren't you looking happier?", he wrote, "It suddenly occurred to me that after nine years of fame I now had something solid about which to be famous... and cheered up no end." During his time as a Member of Parliament, he visited China with a delegation of MPs, including Winston Churchill, the grandson of the wartime prime minister. When Churchill was given the best room in the hotel, on account of his lineage, Freud (in a reference to his own famous forebear) declared it was the first time in his life that he had been "out-grandfathered".

== Callaghan and freedom of information ==
In the last year of James Callaghan's government there was a proposal to revive the one-year Lib–Lab pact which had lapsed in July 1978, to include introducing a freedom of information act, long proposed by the Liberals; however, Callaghan himself was opposed to this kind of legislation. Towards the end of the five-year term there was a confidence vote in Callaghan's government, and Freud was expected to follow his party and vote with the Opposition.

Due to by-election defeats Labour's Callaghan ran a minority government and sought support of members from opposing parties to support him that day; to that end Freud, in Liverpool at the time, received a phone call from 10 Downing Street at 3:00 p.m. asking him to miss his train back to London for the 10:00 p.m. vote, in exchange for a "looser" version of his proposed freedom of information act being enacted. Freud declined the offer and voted as stated by his party, after the lapse of the Lib-Lab pact, for an immediate general election. Otherwise the government could have continued until October 1979.

== Radio, music and academia ==
For many, Freud was best known as a panellist on the long-running Radio 4 show Just a Minute. Freud appears alongside other celebrities on the cover of Wings' 1973 album Band on the Run. He also made the occasional film appearance, with acting roles in movies such as The Mini-Affair (1968) and The Best House in London (1969). In 1974, he was elected Rector of the University of Dundee and served two three-year terms. A generation later, in 2002, he was elected Rector of the University of St Andrews, beating feminist and academic Germaine Greer and local challenger Barry Joss, holding the position for one term.

== Family and hobbies ==
His son Matthew Freud founded the London public relations firm Freud Communications in 1985. Matthew Freud was formerly married to Caroline Hutton, who was the second wife of Earl Spencer; he then married media magnate Rupert Murdoch's daughter Elisabeth.

Clement Freud's daughter Emma Freud, a broadcaster, is the partner of Richard Curtis, scriptwriter of Blackadder and Four Weddings and a Funeral. His nieces (by his painter brother Lucian) include poet Annie Freud, fashion designer Bella Freud, and writer Esther Freud. His eldest brother, Stephen Freud, closely guarded his privacy, with the exception of a 2008 interview he gave to The Daily Telegraph. Stephen died in 2015, at the age of 93. Freud died without resolving a feud with his brother Lucian, thought to have dated back 70 years, over which of them was the rightful winner of a boyhood race. There have been claims that Freud fathered a child in the mid-1950s with the family's 17-year-old nanny.

Freud was a columnist for the Racing Post newspaper. Freud's enthusiasm for horse racing went as far as challenging Sir Hugh Fraser, then chairman of Harrods, to a horse race at Haydock in 1972. Freud trained for three months and lost some five stone for the event. Although Fraser, a country gentleman, was seen as a much better prospect, the two made a bet for £1,000-a-side. Freud used the long odds to his advantage, however, and shrewdly placed a large side bet on himself. Freud won the race and made a great deal of money. His horse, Winter Fair, went on to win the Waterloo Hurdle at Aintree that year.

Freud wrote articles reviewing facilities for spectators at racecourses in Britain, especially catering. This led him to receive the nickname "Sir Clement Food".

== Death and funeral ==
Freud died at his home on 15 April 2009, nine days before his 85th birthday. His funeral service was held at St Bride's Church in Fleet Street and was attended by a host of personalities from the media and entertainment industry including Bono, Richard Curtis, Stephen Fry, Paul Merton, Debbie McGee and Nicholas Parsons, as well as several representatives from Westminster, such as then-Prime Minister Gordon Brown, then-Shadow Chancellor George Osborne and former Liberal party leader Lord Steel. He was survived by his wife of 59 years, Jill Freud, his five children, his 17 grandchildren and his two elder brothers, Stephen and Lucian.

== Child sexual abuse allegations ==
On 15 June 2016, allegations were made in an ITV documentary, Exposure: Abused and Betrayed – A Life Sentence, that Freud had engaged in child sexual abuse between the 1940s and the 1970s. Two women, who did not know each other, spoke publicly for the first time to claim Freud had preyed upon them when they were children and into their young adulthood. Sylvia Woosley contacted the ITV News team – the same team that exposed Jimmy Savile – and told them she had been abused for many years by Freud, from the age of 10 in the 1950s to when she left his home aged 19. The second woman, who remained anonymous, said that Freud had groomed her from the age of 11 in 1971, abused her at 14, and violently raped her at 18, by which time Freud had become a Liberal MP. On the day of the documentary broadcast, Freud's widow, Jill Freud, issued an apology to both women. She accepted the claims and issued a statement of sympathy for his victims, saying: "I sincerely hope they will now have some peace."

A third woman, Vicky Hayes, alleged that she was assaulted and raped by Freud when she was aged 17. Hayes said Freud had no right to his reputation as a "pillar of society" and ought to be posthumously stripped of his knighthood. It also emerged that Operation Yewtree had been passed Freud's name in 2012 when two alleged victims made accusations to the National Society for the Prevention of Cruelty to Children (NSPCC).

Allegations were also made of predatory behaviour by Freud towards female students during his time as Rector of the University of Dundee in the 1970s. Craig Murray, a former British ambassador, who was a student at Dundee University in the late 1970s, described an incident when Freud asked the president of the students' union to pimp for him and select a woman to entertain him.

== Honours ==
Freud was created a Knight Bachelor in the 1988 New Year Honours.

== Bibliography ==
- 1968 – Grimble – illustrated by Quentin Blake
- 1973 – Grimble at Christmas – illustrated by Quentin Blake
- 1978 – Freud on Food
- 1980 – Clicking Vicky
- 1981 – The Book of Hangovers – 1982 paperback version illustrated by Bill Tidy
- 1983 – Below the Belt
- 1988 – No one Else Has Complained
- 1989 – The Gourmet's Tour of Great Britain and Ireland
- 2001 – Freud Ego – an autobiography. (The title is a pun on 'fried egg', ego being a Latin word used by his psychoanalyst grandfather.)
- 2009 – Freud on Course – The Racing Lives of Clement Freud

== See also ==
- Freud family

Parliament of the United Kingdom
Preceded by Henry Legge-Bourke	Member of Parliament for Isle of Ely; 1973–1983	Constituency abolished
New constituency	Member of Parliament for North East Cambridgeshire; 1983–1987	Succeeded by Malcolm Moss
Academic offices
Preceded by Peter Ustinov	Rector of the University of Dundee; 1974–1980	Succeeded by The Baron Mackie of Benshie
Preceded by Andrew Neil	Rector of the University of St Andrews; 2002–2005	Succeeded by Simon Pepper
