= Isle of Ely (constituency) =

Parliamentary constituency in the United Kingdom, 1918–1983

- Former county constituency for the House of Commons
- County: Cambridgeshire

1918–1983
- Seats: One
- Created from: Wisbech; Newmarket (part); Chesterton (part)
- Replaced by: NE Cambridgeshire; SE Cambridgeshire

Isle of Ely was a county constituency represented in the House of Commons of the Parliament of the United Kingdom, centred on the Isle of Ely in Cambridgeshire. Until its abolition in 1983, it elected one Member of Parliament (MP) by the first past the post system of election.

== History ==
The isle had previously been represented by two members of the First and Second Protectorate Parliaments, between 1654 and 1658.

The twentieth century constituency was created in 1918 and remained virtually unchanged until its abolition in 1983. The territory included in the new seat was similar to that previously constituting the Wisbech constituency (the Northern division of Cambridgeshire). That constituency was dominated by the Fens, a district of Liberal inclined smallholders. The towns in the Wisbech division, predominantly Conservative Wisbech and the more Liberal inclined March, tended to be outvoted by the rural areas.

The small city of Ely had formerly been part of the Newmarket constituency (the east division of Cambridgeshire). Pelling suggests Ely was Conservative "because of the cathedral and its fairly substantial middle-class population".

In 1918, the former Liberal MP for Wisbech, Colin Coote, was returned unopposed as a Coalition Liberal. In 1922 Coote contested the seat again, this time as a National Liberal candidate. A Labour candidate appeared for the first time. The anti-Conservative vote was badly split (National Liberal 27.7% and Labour 21.4%), so the Conservative soldier Lieutenant Colonel Norman Coates was easily elected. Coates retired and did not seek re-election in 1923.

In 1923, the reunited Liberal Party nominated a member of the family of one of their richest members. Henry Mond was the son of the industrialist Alfred Mond (later the 1st Lord Melchett). He was able to squeeze the Labour vote down to 12.4%, which was sufficient for a narrow Liberal victory as part of the party's best election result after the First World War.

In the 1924 general election, both the Conservative and Labour candidates increased their vote. Mond was defeated. The new MP was the Conservative, Sir Hugh Lucas-Tooth, Bt. Lucas-Tooth had a long political career, not leaving the House of Commons until 1970, but he only retained this seat for one Parliament until his defeat in 1929.

The Monds had joined the Conservative Party in 1926 after a disagreement with Lloyd George's land policy. However another rich Liberal stood in this constituency in 1929, the flamboyant James de Rothschild. He retained the seat for three Parliaments, serving from 1929 to 1945. In the 1945 general election de Rothschild came third, the first time this had happened to any Liberal candidate in the constituency.

It must have appeared that the days when the Isle seat was a Conservative/Liberal marginal had ended in 1945. The new Conservative MP, Harry Legge-Bourke, had a majority of 6.1% over Labour, with the Liberal almost 10% further behind. He retained the seat until his death in 1973, with Labour in second place. The Liberal Party did not contest general elections in 1951, 1955, 1959, 1964 and 1970. The Liberal vote in 1966 was only 11.4%.

Clement Freud gained the seat for the Liberals from the Conservatives in a 1973 by-election during the height of the 1970s Liberal revival. He retained the seat until it was abolished in 1983 and won the successor seat of North East Cambridgeshire that year, but was defeated in 1987.

The constituency was renamed in 1983, with most of the territory incorporated into the constituency of North East Cambridgeshire.

== Boundaries ==
=== 1918-1974 ===
In the Representation of the People Act 1918, the constituency was defined as having the same boundaries as the administrative county of the Isle of Ely, which had been formed in 1889 from a traditional sub-division of the historic county of Cambridgeshire in East Anglia. The bulk of the constituency was formed from the abolished Wisbech Division of Cambridgeshire, with the northernmost parts of the abolished Chesterton and Newmarket Divisions, including the city of Ely.

=== 1974-1983 ===
In 1965, the Isle of Ely county was merged into the new administrative county of Cambridgeshire and Isle of Ely and in the next redistribution of parliamentary seats, which took effect for the February 1974 general election, the constituency was defined as comprising:

- The Municipal Borough of Wisbech;
- The urban districts of Chatteris, Ely, March, and Whittlesey; and
- The rural districts of Ely, North Witchford, and Wisbech.

The only change was the loss of the small rural district of Thorney, which had been included in the new administrative county of Huntingdon and Peterborough and was now transferred to the borough constituency of Peterborough.

Meanwhile, as a result of the Local Government Act 1972, the two counties of Cambridgeshire and Isle of Ely, and Huntingdon and Peterborough were merged to form the non-metropolitan county of Cambridgeshire, with effect from 1 April 1974. However, the next redistribution did not come into effect until the 1983 general election, when the constituency was largely replaced by North East Cambridgeshire. The city of Ely was included in the new constituency of South East Cambridgeshire, and the villages of Thorney and Eye were returned from Peterborough.

== Members of Parliament ==
=== 1654-1658 ===
Year	Member(s)
1654–55	John Thurloe; George Glapthorn
1656–58	John Thurloe

=== 1918-1983 ===
Year	Member	Party
1918	Colin Coote	Coalition Liberal
1922	Colin Coote	National Liberal
1922	Norman Coates	Unionist
1923	Henry Mond	Liberal
1924	Hugh Lucas-Tooth	Unionist
1929	James de Rothschild	Liberal
1945	Harry Legge-Bourke	Conservative
1973 by-election	Clement Freud	Liberal

== Elections ==
=== Elections in the 1910s ===
Colin Coote

General election 1918: Isle of Ely
Party		Candidate	Votes	%	±%
C	National Liberal	Colin Coote	Unopposed		
	National Liberal win (new seat)				
C indicates candidate endorsed by the coalition government.

=== Elections in the 1920s ===
General election 1922: Isle of Ely
Party	Candidate	Votes	%	±%
Unionist	Norman Coates	13,552	50.9	N/A
National Liberal	Colin Coote	7,359	27.7	N/A
Labour	William George Hall	5,688	21.4	New
Majority		6,193	23.2	N/A
Turnout		26,599	72.0	N/A
Unionist gain from National Liberal		Swing	N/A	

General election 1923: Isle of Ely
Party	Candidate	Votes	%	±%
Liberal	Henry Mond	11,476	44.7	+17.0
Unionist	Max Townley	11,009	42.9	−8.0
Labour	Richard Henry Kennard Hope	3,172	12.4	−9.0
Majority		467	1.8	N/A
Turnout		25,657	68.1	−3.9
Registered electors		37,656		
Liberal gain from Unionist		Swing	+12.5	

General election 1924: Isle of Ely
Party	Candidate	Votes	%	±%
Unionist	Hugh Lucas-Tooth	13,344	46.1	+3.2
Liberal	Henry Mond	11,381	39.3	−5.4
Labour	Dermot Freyer	4,235	14.6	+2.2
Majority		1,963	6.8	N/A
Turnout		28,960	75.7	+7.6
Registered electors		38,281		
Unionist gain from Liberal		Swing	+4.3	

General election 1929: Isle of Ely
Party	Candidate	Votes	%	±%
Liberal	James de Rothschild	16,111	43.9	+4.6
Unionist	Hugh Lucas-Tooth	13,628	37.1	−9.0
Labour	Dermot Freyer	6,967	19.0	+4.4
Majority		2,483	6.8	N/A
Turnout		36,706	75.0	−0.7
Liberal gain from Unionist		Swing	+6.8	

=== Elections in the 1930s ===
General election 1931: Isle of Ely
Party	Candidate	Votes	%	±%
Liberal	James de Rothschild	20,842	64.8	+20.9
Agricultural Party	John Alexander Whitehead	6,993	21.8	New
Labour	Francis Joseph Knowles	4,302	13.4	−5.6
Majority		13,849	43.0	+36.2
Turnout		32,137	63.2	−11.8
Registered electors		50,849		
Liberal hold		Swing	−0.45	

General election 1935: Isle of Ely
Party	Candidate	Votes	%	±%
Liberal	James de Rothschild	17,671	51.0	−13.8
Conservative	William Garthwaite	16,972	49.0	New
Majority		699	2.0	−41.0
Turnout		34,643	66.0	+2.8
Registered electors		52,515		
Liberal hold		Swing	−31.4	

=== Elections in the 1940s ===
General election 1945: Isle of Ely
Party	Candidate	Votes	%	±%
Conservative	Harry Legge-Bourke	15,592	40.6	−8.4
Labour	Alfred Francis Colenso Gray	13,271	34.5	New
Liberal	James de Rothschild	9,564	24.9	−26.1
Majority		2,321	6.1	N/A
Turnout		38,427	67.8	+1.8
Registered electors		56,661		
Conservative gain from Liberal		Swing	+8.85	

=== Elections in the 1950s ===
General election 1950: Isle of Ely
Party	Candidate	Votes	%	±%
Conservative	Harry Legge-Bourke	21,528	45.0	+4.4
Labour	Alfred Francis Colenso Gray	16,565	34.6	+0.1
Liberal	Grenville Jones	9,733	20.4	−4.5
Majority		4,963	10.4	+4.3
Turnout		47,826	79.6	+11.8
Registered electors		60,070		
Conservative hold		Swing	+2.15	

General election 1951: Isle of Ely
Party	Candidate	Votes	%	±%
Conservative	Harry Legge-Bourke	26,319	56.9	+11.9
Labour	Alfred Francis Colenso Gray	19,915	43.1	+8.5
Majority		6,404	13.8	+3.4
Turnout		46,234	75.9	−3.7
Registered electors		60,918		
Conservative hold		Swing	+1.7	

General election 1955: Isle of Ely
Party	Candidate	Votes	%	±%
Conservative	Harry Legge-Bourke	24,862	57.4	+0.5
Labour	Alfred Francis Colenso Gray	18,416	42.6	−0.5
Majority		6,446	14.8	+1.0
Turnout		43,278	70.7	−5.2
Registered electors		61,188		
Conservative hold		Swing	+0.5	

General election 1959: Isle of Ely
Party	Candidate	Votes	%	±%
Conservative	Harry Legge-Bourke	26,173	57.0	−0.4
Labour	Derek Page	19,705	43.0	+0.4
Majority		6,468	14.0	−0.8
Turnout		45,878	74.7	+4.0
Registered electors		61,387		
Conservative hold		Swing	−0.4	

=== Elections in the 1960s ===
General election 1964: Isle of Ely
Party	Candidate	Votes	%	±%
Conservative	Harry Legge-Bourke	25,317	56.2	−0.8
Labour	Cyril Shaw	19,692	43.8	+0.8
Majority		5,625	12.4	−1.6
Turnout		45,009	73.8	−0.9
Registered electors		61,004		
Conservative hold		Swing	−0.8	

General election 1966: Isle of Ely
Party	Candidate	Votes	%	±%
Conservative	Harry Legge-Bourke	21,320	46.2	−10.0
Labour	Graham Nurse	19,566	43.8	0.0
Liberal	Derek Malcolm Rigby	5,250	11.4	New
Majority		1,754	2.4	−10.0
Turnout		46,136	75.9	+2.1
Registered electors		60,758		
Conservative hold		Swing	−4.3	

=== Elections in the 1970s ===
General election 1970: Isle of Ely
Party	Candidate	Votes	%	±%
Conservative	Harry Legge-Bourke	28,972	59.9	+13.7
Labour	Rex Edgar O'Hare	19,366	40.1	−3.7
Majority		9,606	19.8	+17.4
Turnout		48,338	71.9	−4.0
Registered electors		67,226		
Conservative hold		Swing	+8.7	

1973 Isle of Ely by-election
Party	Candidate	Votes	%	±%
Liberal	Clement Freud	17,390	38.3	New
Conservative	John Burdett Stevens	15,920	35.0	−24.9
Labour	Barry A Young	12,153	26.7	−13.4
Majority		1,470	3.3	N/A
Turnout		45,463	65.8	−6.1
Registered electors		69,069		
Liberal gain from Conservative		Swing	+31.6	

General election February 1974: Isle of Ely
Party	Candidate	Votes	%	±%
Liberal	Clement Freud	27,647	49.0	N/A
Conservative	John Burdett Stevens	19,300	34.2	−25.7
Labour	Michael Brandon Harris	9,478	16.8	−23.3
Majority		8,347	14.8	N/A
Turnout		56,425	83.1	+11.2
Registered electors		67,913		
Liberal gain from Conservative		Swing	+37.35	

General election October 1974: Isle of Ely
Party	Candidate	Votes	%	±%
Liberal	Clement Freud	22,040	41.7	−7.3
Conservative	Thomas Stuttaford	19,355	36.7	+2.5
Labour	Michael Brandon Harris	11,420	21.6	+4.8
Majority		2,685	5.0	−9.8
Turnout		52,815	77.1	−6.0
Registered electors		68,473		
Liberal hold		Swing	−4.9	

General election 1979: Isle of Ely
Party	Candidate	Votes	%	±%
Liberal	Clement Freud	26,397	46.7	+5.0
Conservative	Thomas Stuttaford	23,067	40.8	+4.1
Labour	Colin Harry Saunders	7,067	12.5	−9.1
Majority		3,330	5.9	+0.9
Turnout		56,531	80.8	+3.7
Registered electors		69,954		
Liberal hold		Swing	+0.45	

== See also ==
- Parliamentary representation from Cambridgeshire
- 1973 Isle of Ely by-election
- List of former United Kingdom Parliament constituencies

== Sources ==
- Boundaries of Parliamentary Constituencies 1885–1972, compiled and edited by F.W.S. Craig (Political Reference Publications 1972)
- British Parliamentary Election Results 1918–1949, compiled and edited by F.W.S. Craig (The Macmillan Press 1977)
- British Parliamentary Election Results 1950–1973, compiled and edited by F.W.S. Craig (Parliamentary Research Services 1983)
- British Parliamentary Election Results 1974–1983, compiled and edited by F.W.S. Craig (Parliamentary Research Services 1984)
- Social Geography of British Elections 1885–1910, by Henry Pelling (Macmillan 1967)
- Who's Who of British members of parliament, Volume III 1919–1945, edited by M. Stenton and S. Lees (Harvester Press 1979)
- Who's Who of British members of parliament, Volume IV 1945–1979, edited by M. Stenton and S. Lees (Harvester Press 1981)
