= Arthur Brand =

British politician

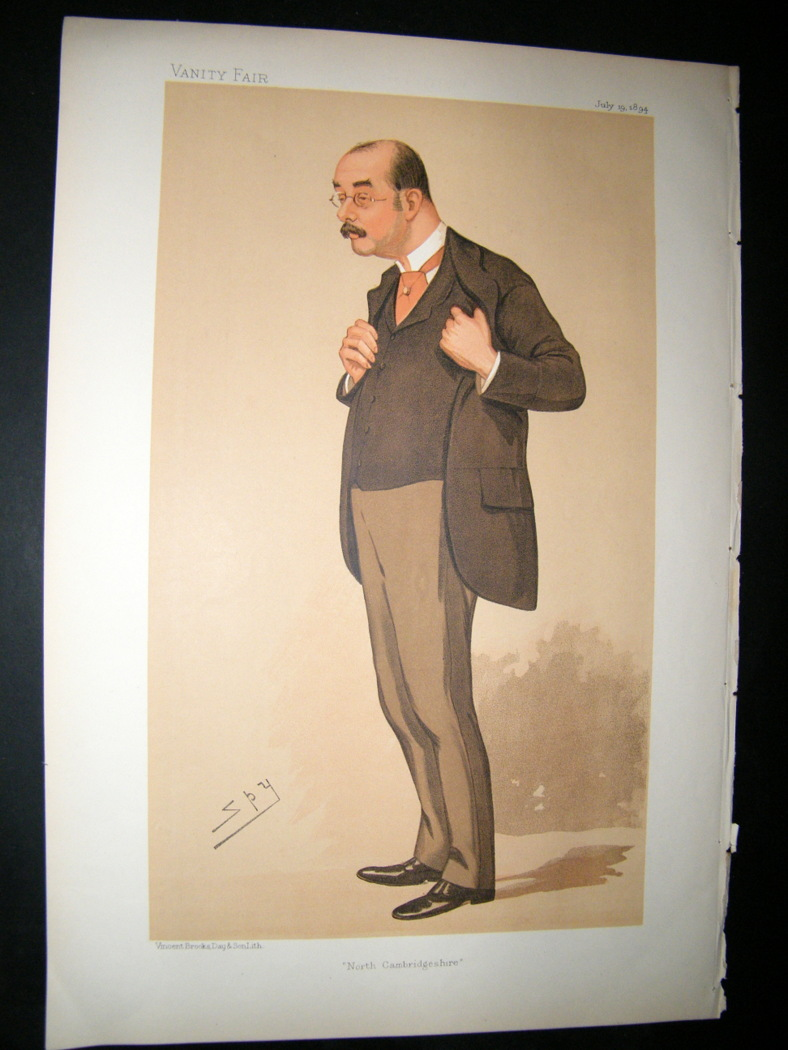
"North Cambridgeshire". Caricature by Spy published in Vanity Fair in 1894.

The Hon. Arthur George Brand (1 May 1853 – 9 January 1917) was a British Liberal politician.

Brand was the third son of Henry Brand, 1st Viscount Hampden, second son of Henry Trevor, 21st Baron Dacre. His mother was Eliza, daughter of General Robert Ellice, while Henry Brand, 2nd Viscount Hampden, was his elder brother. He entered Parliament for Wisbech in an 1891 by-election, and served in the Liberal administration of the Earl of Rosebery as Treasurer of the Household from 1894 to 1895. He lost his seat in the 1895 general election, but was again elected for Wisbech in 1900. Two years later he indicated in late 1902 to his constituency association that he would not contest the seat again, but he held the seat until the next election in 1906.

Brand married Edith, daughter of Joseph Ingram, in 1886, they had one son, Captain the Hon. Henry Arthur Trevor Brand of the 12th Royal Lancers who married Elsie, daughter of Canon Mark James. She died in April 1903. Brand survived her by fourteen years and died in January 1917, aged 63.

Parliament of the United Kingdom
Preceded by Charles William Selwyn	Member of Parliament for Wisbech; 1891 – 1895	Succeeded by Charles Tyrrell Giles
Preceded by Charles Tyrrell Giles	Member of Parliament for Wisbech; 1900 – 1906	Succeeded by Cecil Beck
Political offices
Preceded by The Earl of Chesterfield	Treasurer of the Household; 1894–1895	Succeeded by Marquess of Carmarthen
