= Wisbech (constituency) =

Parliamentary constituency in the United Kingdom, 1885–1918

- Former county constituency for the House of Commons

1885–1918
- Seats: one
- Created from: Cambridgeshire
- Replaced by: Isle of Ely

Wisbech is a former United Kingdom Parliamentary constituency. It was created upon the abolition of an undivided Cambridgeshire county constituency in 1885 and was itself abolished in 1918.

== History ==
The Redistribution of Seats Act 1885 split the former three-member Cambridgeshire parliamentary county into three single-member divisions. One of these was the Northern or Wisbech Division. During the committee stage of the 1885 bill, the MP for Cambridge University, Henry Raikes made an unsuccessful attempt to rename the constituency as the Northern or Isle of Ely Division.

This fenland constituency was dominated by a district of Liberal-inclined smallholders. The towns in the division, predominantly Conservative Wisbech and the more Liberal-inclined March, were outvoted by the rural areas.

Upon its abolition under the Representation of the People Act 1918, the constituency formed the bulk of the new parliamentary county of Isle of Ely.

== Boundaries ==
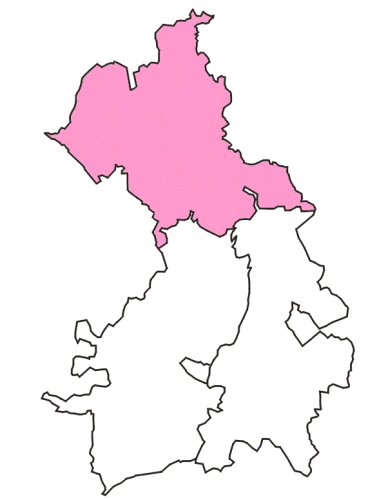
Wisbech in Cambridgeshire 1885-1918

The contents of the division were defined as:

- The Municipal Borough of Wisbech;
- The Sessional Divisions of North Witchford, Whittlesea and Wisbech; and
- The Parishes of Coveney, Downham, and Littleport.

The constituency consisted of the towns of Chatteris, March, Whittlesey and the Borough and port of Wisbech with the surrounding parishes of Benwick, Doddington, Downham, Elm, Leverington, Littleport, Manea, Newton, Parson Drove, Thorney, Tydd St Giles, Welches Dam and Wimblington.

The area was bounded by the constituencies of Spalding to the north, North West Norfolk and South West Norfolk to the east, the other Cambridgeshire divisions of Newmarket and Chesterton to the south and Ramsey, Peterborough and North Northamptonshire to the west.

== Members of Parliament ==
Year	Member	Party
1885	Sir John Rigby	Liberal
1886	Charles William Selwyn	Conservative
1891 by-election	Arthur Brand	Liberal
1895	Charles Tyrrell Giles	Conservative
1900	Arthur Brand	Liberal
1906	Cecil Beck	Liberal
1910	Neil Primrose	Liberal
1916	Neil Primrose	Coalition Liberal
1917 by-election	Colin Coote	Coalition Liberal
1918	constituency abolished	

== Election results ==
=== Elections in the 1880s ===
General election 1885: Wisbech
Party	Candidate	Votes	%
Liberal	John Rigby	3,919	52.1
Conservative	Charles William Selwyn	3,596	47.9
Majority		323	4.2
Turnout		7,515	78.8
Registered electors		9,532	
Liberal win (new seat)			

General election 1886: Wisbech
Party	Candidate	Votes	%	±%
Conservative	Charles William Selwyn	4,169	57.5	+9.6
Liberal	John Rigby	3,082	42.5	−9.6
Majority		1,087	15.0	N/A
Turnout		7,251	76.1	−2.7
Registered electors		9,532		
Conservative gain from Liberal		Swing	+9.6	

=== Elections in the 1890s ===
Selwyn's resignation caused a by-election.

By-election, 23 Jul 1891: Wisbech
Party	Candidate	Votes	%	±%
Liberal	Arthur Brand	3,979	51.7	+9.2
Conservative	Surr William Duncan	3,719	48.3	−9.2
Majority		260	3.4	N/A
Turnout		7,698	65.7	−10.4
Registered electors		11,725		
Liberal gain from Conservative		Swing	+9.2	

General election 1892: Wisbech
Party	Candidate	Votes	%	±%
Liberal	Arthur Brand	4,311	50.7	+8.2
Conservative	Surr William Duncan	4,189	49.3	−8.2
Majority		122	1.4	N/A
Turnout		8,500	72.2	−3.9
Registered electors		11,775		
Liberal gain from Conservative		Swing	+8.2	

Brand was appointed Treasurer of the Household, requiring a by-election.

By-election, 3 Apr 1894: Wisbech
Party	Candidate	Votes	%	±%
Liberal	Arthur Brand	4,363	50.8	+0.1
Conservative	Sackville Stopford-Sackville	4,227	49.2	−0.1
Majority		136	1.6	+0.2
Turnout		8,590	81.7	+9.5
Registered electors		10,514		
Liberal hold		Swing	+0.1	

Giles

General election 1895: Wisbech
Party	Candidate	Votes	%	±%
Conservative	Charles Tyrrell Giles	4,368	51.3	+2.0
Liberal	Arthur Brand	4,145	48.7	−2.0
Majority		223	2.6	N/A
Turnout		8,513	81.1	+8.9
Registered electors		10,495		
Conservative gain from Liberal		Swing	+2.0	

=== Elections in the 1900s ===
General election 1900: Wisbech
Party	Candidate	Votes	%	±%
Liberal	Arthur Brand	4,007	51.0	+2.3
Conservative	Charles Tyrrell Giles	3,846	49.0	−2.3
Majority		161	2.0	N/A
Turnout		7,853	76.7	−4.4
Registered electors		10,232		
Liberal gain from Conservative		Swing	+2.3	

Cecil Beck

General election 1906: Wisbech
Party	Candidate	Votes	%	±%
Liberal	Cecil Beck	5,125	55.7	+4.7
Conservative	T C Garfit	4,080	44.3	−4.7
Majority		1,045	11.4	+9.4
Turnout		9,205	83.4	+6.7
Registered electors		11,033		
Liberal hold		Swing	+4.7	

=== Elections in the 1910s ===
Neil Primrose

General election January 1910: Wisbech
Party	Candidate	Votes	%	±%
Liberal	Neil Primrose	5,279	51.0	−4.7
Conservative	T C Garfit	5,079	49.0	+4.7
Majority		200	2.0	−9.4
Turnout		10,358	88.4	+5.0
Liberal hold		Swing	−4.7	

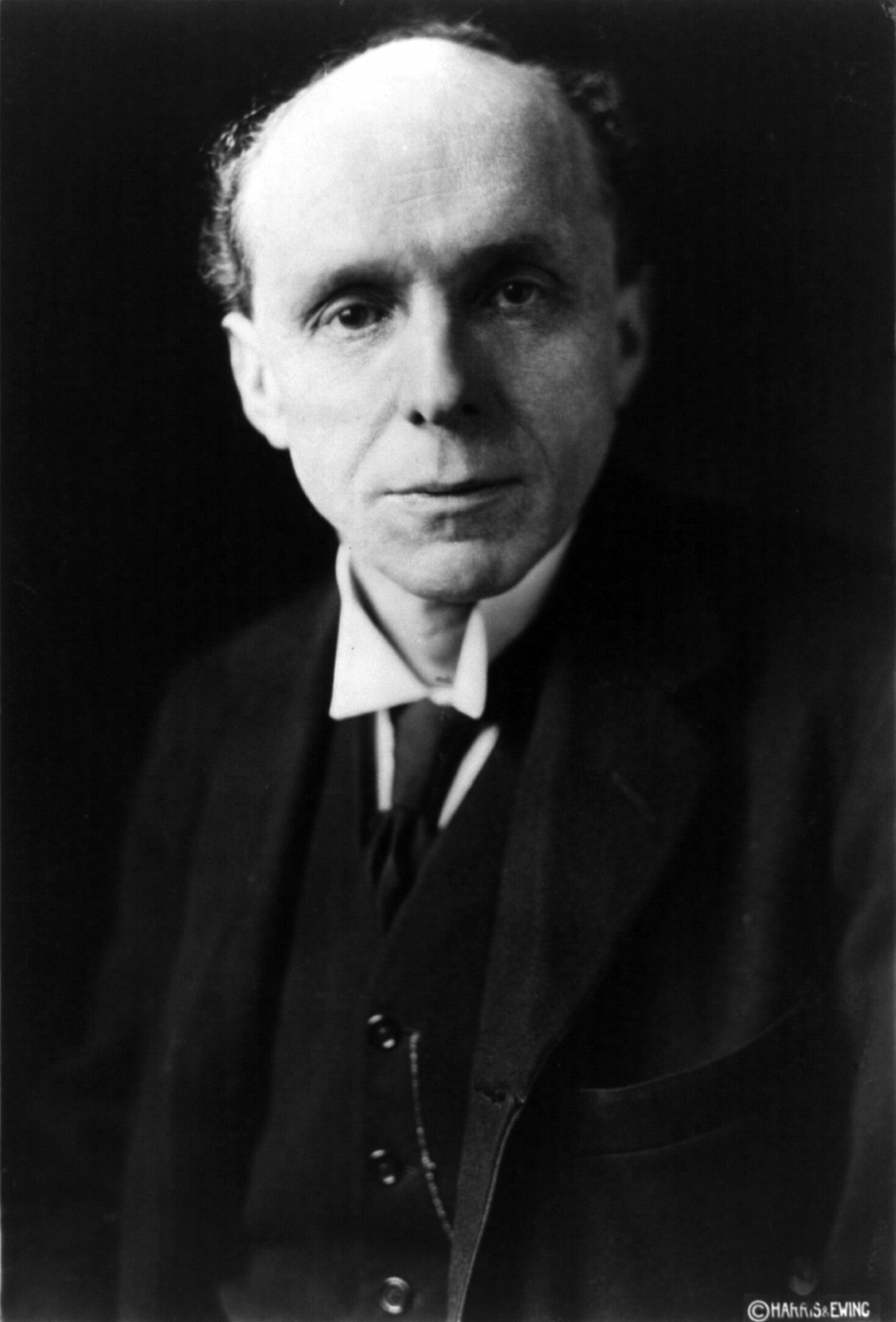
Cecil

General election December 1910: Wisbech
Party	Candidate	Votes	%	±%
Liberal	Neil Primrose	5,401	52.7	+1.7
Conservative	Robert Cecil	4,857	47.3	−1.7
Majority		544	5.4	+3.4
Turnout		10,258	87.6	−0.8
Liberal hold		Swing	+1.7	

Colin Coote

1917 Wisbech by-election
Party	Candidate	Votes	%	±%
National Liberal	Colin Coote	Unopposed		
National Liberal hold				

== Redistribution ==
The constituency ceased to exist when the Representation of the People Act 1918 redefined constituencies throughout Great Britain and Ireland. The new constituencies followed the boundaries of the administrative counties and county districts created by the Local Government Acts of 1888 and 1894. The historic county of Cambridgeshire had been divided by the legislation into two administrative counties: Cambridgeshire and the Isle of Ely. Each of these, along with the Parliamentary Borough of Cambridge, became single-member constituencies. The whole of the former Wisbech constituency was included in the new Isle of Ely seat, to which were added the City of Ely and surrounding district.

== See also ==
- Parliamentary representation from Cambridgeshire
- List of former United Kingdom Parliament constituencies
