= Colin Coote =

British journalist and politician

Sir Colin Coote DSO

Member of Parliament for Isle of Ely
- In office 14 December 1918 – 26 October 1922
- Preceded by: New constituency
- Succeeded by: Norman Coates

Member of Parliament for Wisbech
- In office 14 December 1917 – 25 November 1918
- Preceded by: Neil Primrose
- Succeeded by: Constituency abolished

Personal details
- Born: 19 October 1893 Fenstanton, Huntingdonshire, England
- Died: 8 June 1979 (aged 85) London, England
- Party: Liberal
- Spouses: Marguerite Doris Wellstead (m. 1916; div. 1925) Denise Dethoor (m. 1925; died 1945) Amalie Lewkowitz (m. 1946)
- Education: Rugby School
- Alma mater: Balliol College, Oxford

Military service
- Allegiance: United Kingdom
- Branch/service: British Army
- Unit: Gloucestershire Regiment
- Battles/wars: First World War
- Awards: Distinguished Service Order

Sir Colin Reith Coote, DSO (19 October 1893 – 8 June 1979) was a British journalist and Liberal politician. For fourteen years he was the editor of The Daily Telegraph.

== Biography ==
He was born in Fenstanton, Huntingdonshire. He was the son of Howard Browning Coote of Stukeley Hall, later Lord Lieutenant of Huntingdonshire, and Jean Coote (née Gray) of Aberdeen. He was educated at Rugby School and Balliol College, Oxford, graduating in 1914. On the outbreak of the First World War, he obtained a commission in the Gloucestershire Regiment. He served in France and Italy, and was forced to return to the United Kingdom, having been wounded and gassed. He was awarded the Distinguished Service Order in 1918.

In November 1917, the sitting Liberal Member of Parliament for Wisbech, Neil James Archibald Primrose, was killed in action. Coote was chosen as the Liberal candidate for the seat, and, due to a war-time pact between the two parties, was also nominated by the local Conservative and Unionist Association. He was returned unopposed to the House of Commons on 14 December 1917.

A general election was held in 1918. Constituencies were completely reorganised by the Representation of the People Act 1918, and the Wisbech seat became part of the new Isle of Ely division. Coote was elected as MP for the Isle of Ely, again unopposed.

At the subsequent general election in 1922 his differences with the Conservatives saw them running a candidate against him. Coote, running as a National Liberal, was defeated by Colonel Norman Coates. With hindsight, Coote described his defeat as the "crowning mercy" of his career, as it allowed him to pursue journalism.

Whilst a Member of Parliament, Coote had gained a reputation as a freelance writer. On leaving the Commons, he was appointed Rome correspondent of The Times. His period in Italy saw him covering the rise of Italian Fascism under Benito Mussolini. Returning to the UK in 1926, he spent three years as a parliamentary reporter before becoming a leader writer.

By the time of the Munich Crisis, Coote found himself opposed to the newspaper's support of appeasement, and refused to write leaders supporting the policy. He finally left The Times in 1942 on the resignation of Geoffrey Dawson as editor, and took up a post with The Daily Telegraph. He became deputy editor of the Telegraph in 1945, and succeeded Arthur Watson as editor in 1950. He held the post until 1964, with his Liberal tendencies balancing the otherwise Conservative views of the paper. In 1961, Coote introduced osteopath Stephen Ward to Soviet diplomat Eugene Ivanov, a meeting that would lead to the Profumo affair. He was knighted in 1962.

Coote died at his London home on 8 June 1979, aged 85.

== Family ==
Coote married three times. In 1916, he married Marguerite Doris Wellstead, of Hessle, East Riding of Yorkshire and they had two daughters before divorcing in 1925. He subsequently married Denise Dethoor, of Doulieu, France. She died in 1945, and he married Amalie Lewkowitz in the following year.

Parliament of the United Kingdom
Preceded by Neil Primrose	Member of Parliament for Wisbech; 1917 – 1918	Constituency abolished
New constituency	Member of Parliament for Isle of Ely; 1918 – 1922	Succeeded by Norman Coates
Media offices
Preceded by ?	Deputy Editor of The Daily Telegraph; 1945–1950	Succeeded by Malcolm Muggeridge
Preceded by Arthur Watson	Editor of The Daily Telegraph; 1950–1964	Succeeded by Maurice Green
