= James de Rothschild (politician) =

British Liberal politician and philanthropist (1878–1957)

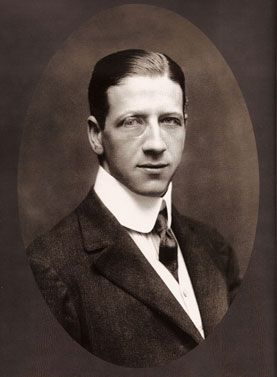

Member of Parliament for Isle of Ely
- In office 30 May 1929 – 15 June 1945
- Preceded by: Hugh Lucas-Tooth
- Succeeded by: Harry Legge-Bourke

Personal details
- Born: James Armand Edmond de Rothschild; 1 December 1878 Paris, France
- Died: 7 May 1957 (aged 78) London, England
- Party: Liberal
- Spouse: Dorothy de Rothschild (m. 1913)
- Parent(s): Edmond James de Rothschild; Adelheid von Rothschild
- Education: Trinity College, Cambridge
- Known for: Member of British Parliament

James Armand Edmond de Rothschild DCM DL (1 December 1878 – 7 May 1957), sometimes known as Jimmy de Rothschild, was a British Liberal politician and philanthropist, from the wealthy Rothschild international banking dynasty.

== Biography ==
De Rothschild was the son of Edmond James de Rothschild of the French branch of family. He was educated at Lycée Louis-le-Grand in Paris and at Trinity College, Cambridge. He served in the First World War, at the outset as an enlisted man in the French Army then as an officer in The Royal Canadian Dragoons, and ended the war as an officer in the British Army, serving in Palestine as a major in the 39th Battalion, The Royal Fusiliers (part of the "Jewish Legion"). He was awarded the Distinguished Conduct Medal prior to commissioning as an officer.

He was a keen follower of the turf and a racehorse owner. His 33-1 runner "Bomba" won the Ascot Gold Cup in 1909.

He married Dorothy Mathilde Pinto in 1913. She was 17 years old; he was 35.

He became a naturalised Briton in 1920, and in 1922 he inherited from Alice de Rothschild the Waddesdon Manor estate of his great-uncle Baron Ferdinand de Rothschild, the Liberal Member of Parliament (MP) for Aylesbury from 1885 to 1898.

== Politics ==
Described by the Journal of Liberal History as "one of the Liberal Party's most colourful MPs", Rothschild served as Liberal Member of Parliament for the Isle of Ely constituency from 1929 to 1945.

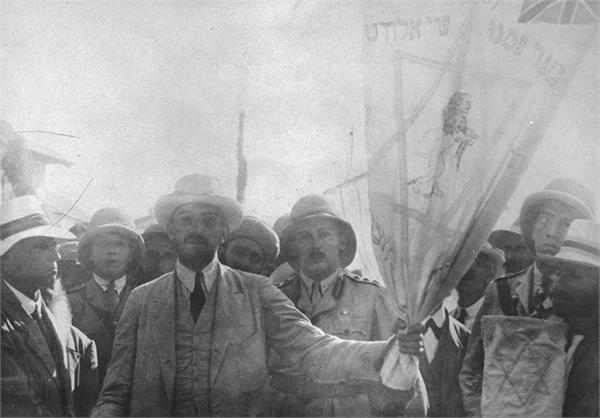
James de Rothschild (right) as a member of the Jewish Legion 1 January 1918

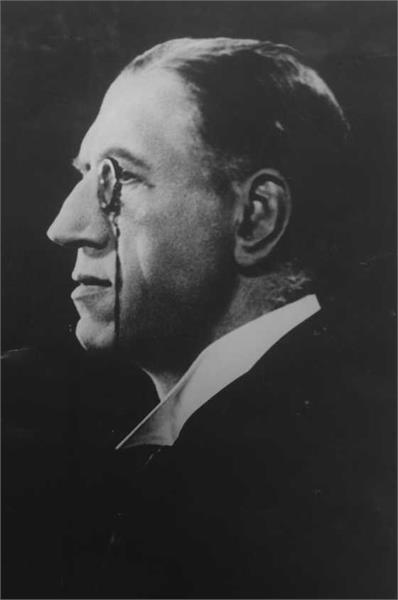
James de Rothschild 1928

His defeat by Harry Legge-Bourke in the 1945 general election was one of only a few gains by the Conservative Party that year, with his Liberal colleagues Archibald Sinclair and William Beveridge similarly losing to Tory opponents.

During the Second World War he was Parliamentary Secretary to the Ministry of Supply in the Coalition Government 1940-1945. He was also a deputy lieutenant for the county of London and a justice of the peace in Buckinghamshire.

== Philanthropy ==
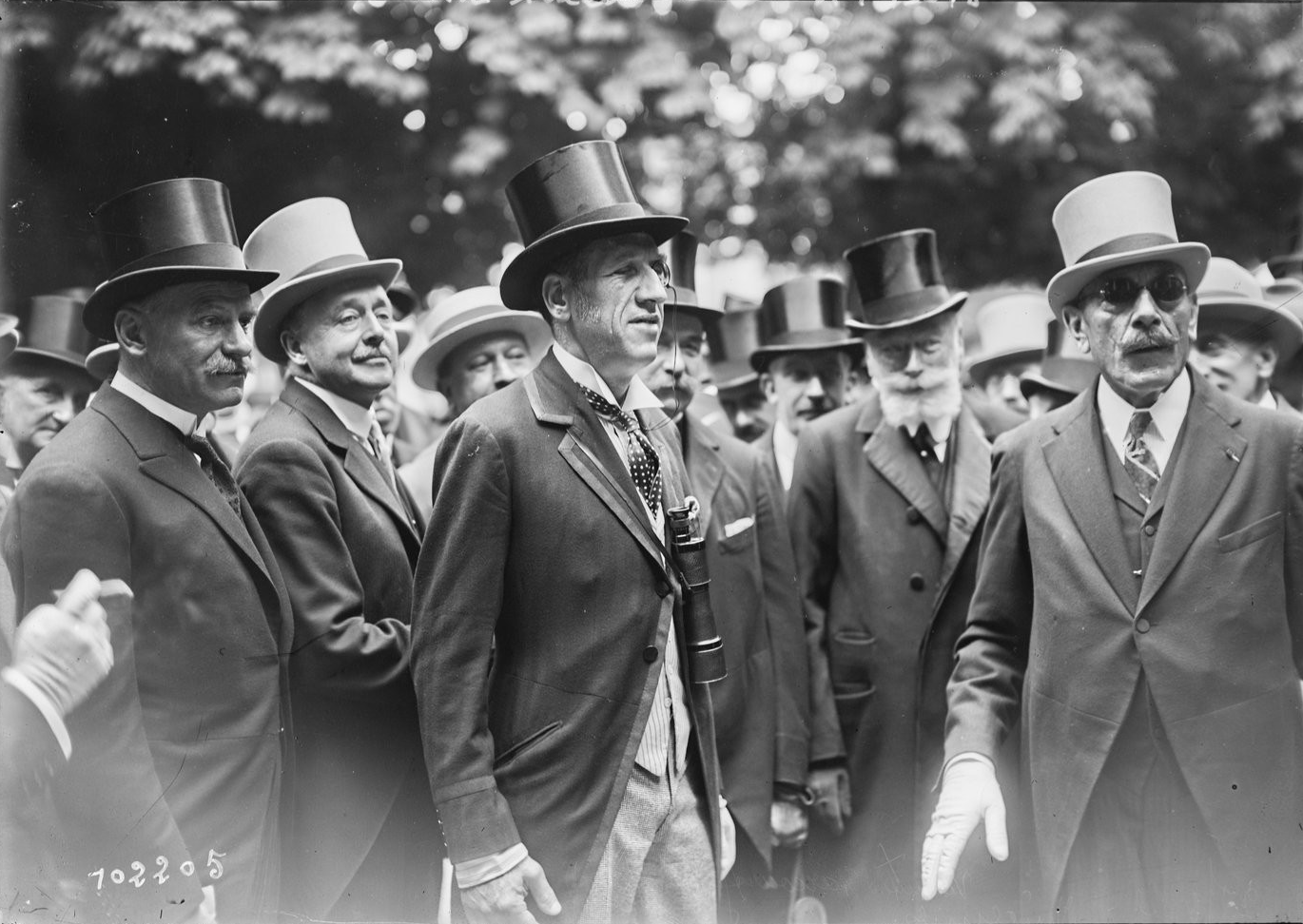
de Rothschild at Longchamp Racecourse in 1928

Rothschild continued to support his father's Zionist causes, and donated IL 6,000,000 towards the construction of the Knesset building in Jerusalem, which was completed in 1966.

When he died in 1957, he bequeathed Waddesdon Manor to the National Trust. His widow Dorothy de Rothschild inherited the surrounding estate, and maintained a strong interest in the house and collections until she died in 1988.

== See also ==
- Palestine Jewish Colonization Association

== Sources ==
- de Rothschild, Dorothy (1979). Rothschilds at Waddesdon Manor. Vendome Press. ISBN 0-670-60854-8.
- Schama, Simon (1978). Two Rothschilds and the Land of Israel. London: Collins. ISBN 0-00-216784-0.

== Notes ==
Parliament of the United Kingdom
Preceded by Hugh Lucas-Tooth	Member of Parliament for Isle of Ely; 1929–1945	Succeeded by Harry Legge-Bourke
