= Neil Primrose (politician) =

British politician

Captain The Right Honourable Neil Primrose MC PC

Government Chief Whip in the House of Commons; Parliamentary Secretary to the Treasury
- In office 14 December 1916 – 2 March 1917 Serving with Edmund FitzAlan-Howard
- Monarch: George V
- Prime Minister: David Lloyd George
- Preceded by: John Gulland
- Succeeded by: Freddie Guest

Under-Secretary of State for Foreign Affairs
- In office 4 February 1915 – 30 May 1915
- Prime Minister: H. H. Asquith
- Preceded by: Francis Dyke Acland
- Succeeded by: Robert Cecil

Member of Parliament for Wisbech
- In office 15 January 1910 – 15 November 1917
- Preceded by: Cecil Beck
- Succeeded by: Colin Coote

Personal details
- Born: Neil James Archibald Primrose; 14 December 1882 Dalmeny House, Dalmeny, Midlothian, UK
- Died: 15 November 1917 (aged 34) Gezer, Palestine
- Resting place: Ramleh Commonwealth War Graves Commission Cemetery
- Party: Coalition Liberal (1916–1917)
- Other political affiliations: Liberal
- Spouse(s): Lady Victoria Stanley (1892–1927)
- Children: Ruth Wood, Countess of Halifax
- Parents: Archibald Primrose, 5th Earl of Rosebery (father); Hannah de Rothschild (mother)
- Education: Eton College
- Awards: Military Cross

Military service
- Allegiance: United Kingdom
- Branch/service: British Army
- Years of service: 1909–1917
- Rank: Captain
- Unit: Royal Buckinghamshire Hussars
- Battles/wars: First World War: Sinai and Palestine Campaign

Neil James Archibald Primrose (14 December 1882 – 15 November 1917) was a British Liberal politician and soldier. The second son of Prime Minister Lord Rosebery, he represented Wisbech in parliament from 1910 to 1917 and served as Under-Secretary of State for Foreign Affairs in 1915 and as joint-Parliamentary Secretary to the Treasury from 1916 to 1917. He died from wounds received in action in Palestine in 1917.

== Background ==
Primrose was born at Dalmeny House near Edinburgh, the second son of Archibald Primrose, 5th Earl of Rosebery, Prime Minister to Queen Victoria from 1894 to 1895, and Hannah de Rothschild, daughter of Baron Mayer de Rothschild. He was the brother of Harry Primrose, 6th Earl of Rosebery and writer Lady Sybil Grant.

He was educated at Eton and Oxford and played No.1 for the Oxford Polo team in 1904 and 1905. While at Oxford he was also a keen steeplechase rider.

== Political career ==
Primrose entered the House of Commons at the January 1910 general election as Member of Parliament (MP) for Wisbech. In 1913 he became a member of the Anglo-American Peace Centenary Committee. In February 1915 he was appointed Under-Secretary of State for Foreign Affairs in H. H. Asquith's Liberal administration, but was not offered a post when the coalition government was formed in May of the same year. When David Lloyd George became prime minister in December 1916, Primrose returned to the government as joint-Parliamentary Secretary to the Treasury (government chief whip) alongside Conservative Edmund FitzAlan-Howard, a post he only held until March of the following year. In June 1917 he was sworn of the Privy Council.

== Military career ==
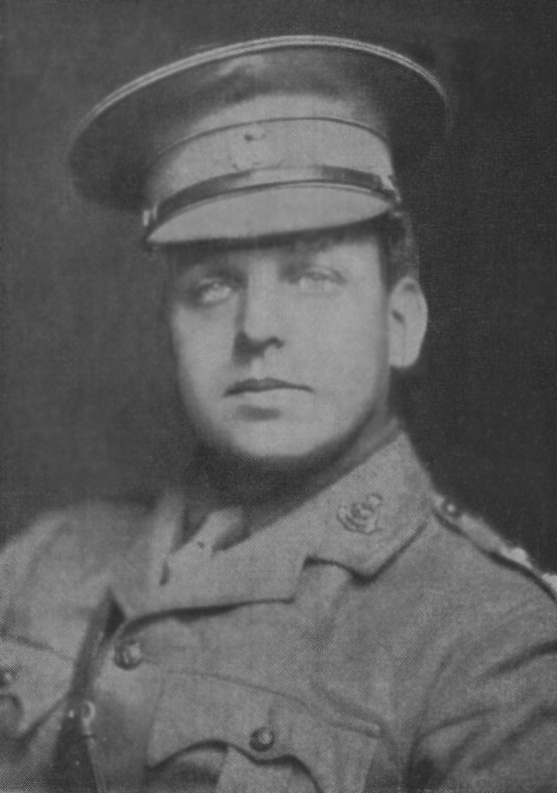
Neil Primrose from the Roll of Honour published in The Illustrated London News on 24 November 1917.

Primrose was commissioned into the Buckinghamshire Yeomanry (Royal Bucks Hussars) in 1909. Promoted Captain in 1915, he was awarded the Military Cross in the King's Birthday Honours of June 1916. He died in November 1917 from wounds received in action at Gezer during the Sinai and Palestine Campaign while leading his squadron of the 1/1st Royal Buckinghamshire Yeomanry against Turkish positions on the Abu Shusheh ridge during the Third Battle of Gaza.

== Commemoration ==
When news of the death of Primrose reached the UK, Prime Minister David Lloyd George paid tribute in the House of Commons on 19 November 1917, alongside his report of the death of Lieutenant General Sir Stanley Maude:

May I be permitted before I sit down to utter one word of another who held an inconspicuous position in the Army but who was well known to all Members of this House. I refer to Captain Neil Primrose. The House knew his bright and radiant spirit well. To his intimates he was one of the most lovable men we ever met. He had ability far above the average, and, in spite of the reserve and shyness which held him back, his future was full of hope. He had already rendered distinguished service in the field, and for that service he had been recognised at the suggestion of his commanding officer; and he might well, for he had many offers, have occupied positions where he could have rendered services to the public, positions honourable to him, but positions of personal safety, and the fact that he had been chosen by his constituents to serve in this House would have rendered his acceptance of these positions honourable to himself. He chose deliberately the path of danger. He fell charging at the head of his troops, at the very moment of victory, and Members of the House will, I feel certain, join me in an expression of deepest sympathy with those whom he has left behind to mourn him.

— David Lloyd George, House of Commons parliamentary debate, 19 November 1917

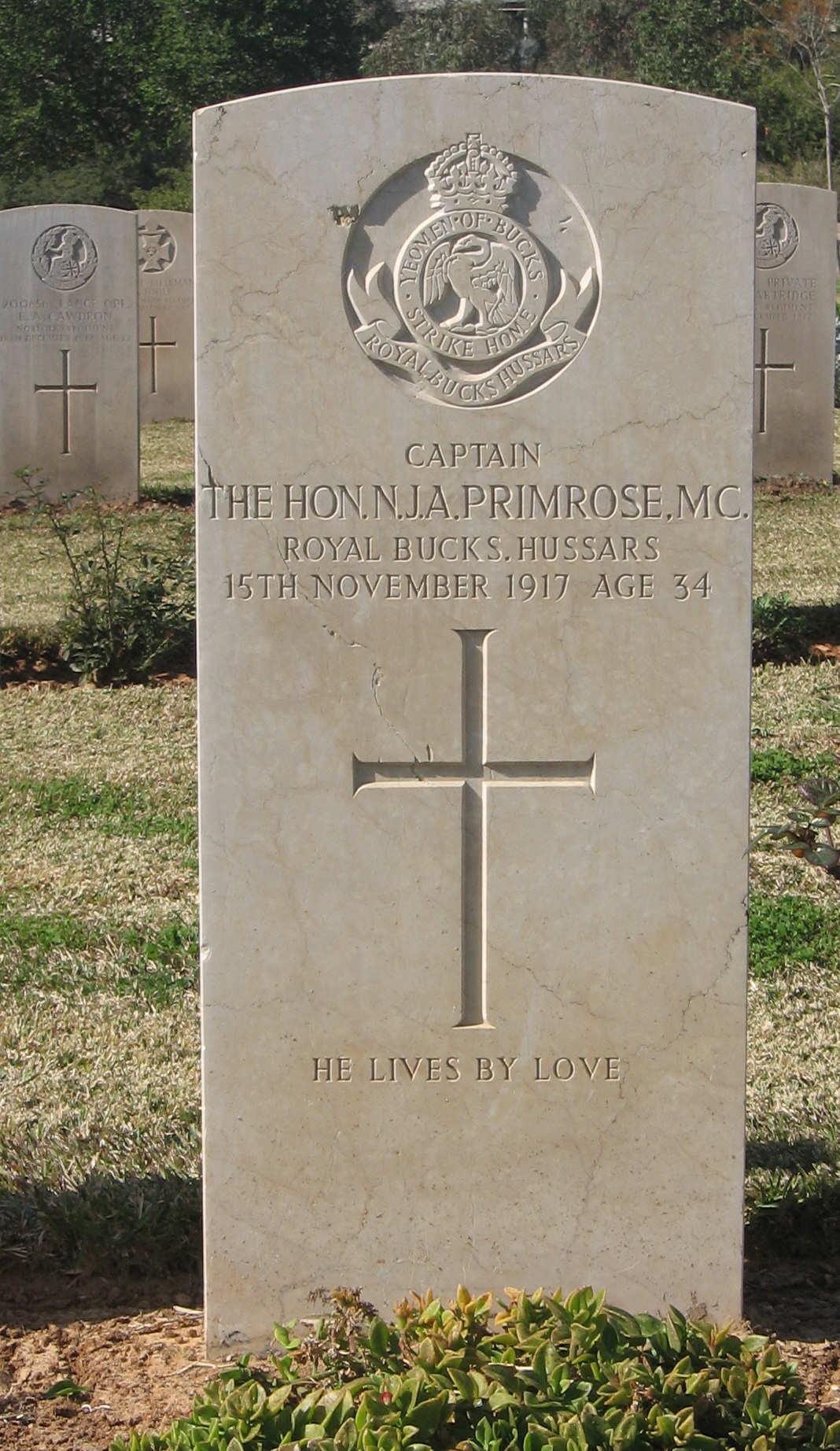
Headstone on Capt. Primrose's grave, Ramleh War Cemetery

Responding to the Prime Minister, the former Prime Minister H. H. Asquith (who had himself lost a son in 1916) referred to "two very great national losses" and also paid his respects:

In regard to the other loss to which my right hon. Friend has referred, and which more particularly affects this House, a more familiar and well-loved face has passed from among us, and I only trust myself to say this, that there are few who can realise better than myself how much of hope and of promise there was for his future, and I am sure that his distinguished father and family will have the heartfelt sympathy of every Member of this House.

— H. H. Asquith, House of Commons parliamentary debate, 19 November 1917

Primrose is buried in the Ramleh Commonwealth War Graves Commission Cemetery at Ramla, in Israel. The inscription on his gravestone reads: HE LIVES BY LOVE. Primrose is commemorated on Panel 8 of the Parliamentary War Memorial in Westminster Hall, one of 22 MPs that died during World War I to be named on that memorial. Primrose is one of 19 MPs who fell in the war who are commemorated by heraldic shields in the Commons Chamber. A further act of commemoration came with the unveiling in 1932 of a manuscript-style illuminated book of remembrance for the House of Commons, which includes a short biographical account of the life and death of Primrose. Memorial tablets were erected by his father in St Giles' Cathedral, Edinburgh, in the Church of St Mary the Virgin, Mentmore, Buckinghamshire, and at Christ Church, Epsom Common, Surrey. Additional memorials were erected to his memory in the form of a stained glass window in St Mary's Church, Knowsley, Merseyside, by his widow's parents, (Note: DEDICATED TO THE GLORY OF GOD BY EDWARD EARL OF DERBY AND ALICE HIS WIFE TO THE MEMORY OF THEIR SON-IN-LAW NEIL PRIMROSE KILLED IN ACTION 15TH NOVEMBER 1917.) and a further plaque was erected by his father in All Saints Church, Postwick, Norfolk. (Note: TO THE DEAR MEMORY OF CAPTAIN THE HON NEIL PRIMROSE MC MP WHO SO TRULY LOVED THIS PLACE OF WHICH HE WAS THE BENIFICENT SQUIRE FOR TOO SHORT A TIME, THIS TABLET IS ERECTED BY HIS SORROWING FATHER. BORN 14 DECEMBER 1882, HE WAS KILLED IN BATTLE 15 NOVEMBER 1917, AT THE HILL OF GEZER IN PALESTINE, AND LIES BURIED AT RAMLEH.)

Memorials erected to the memory of Neil Primrose by his father

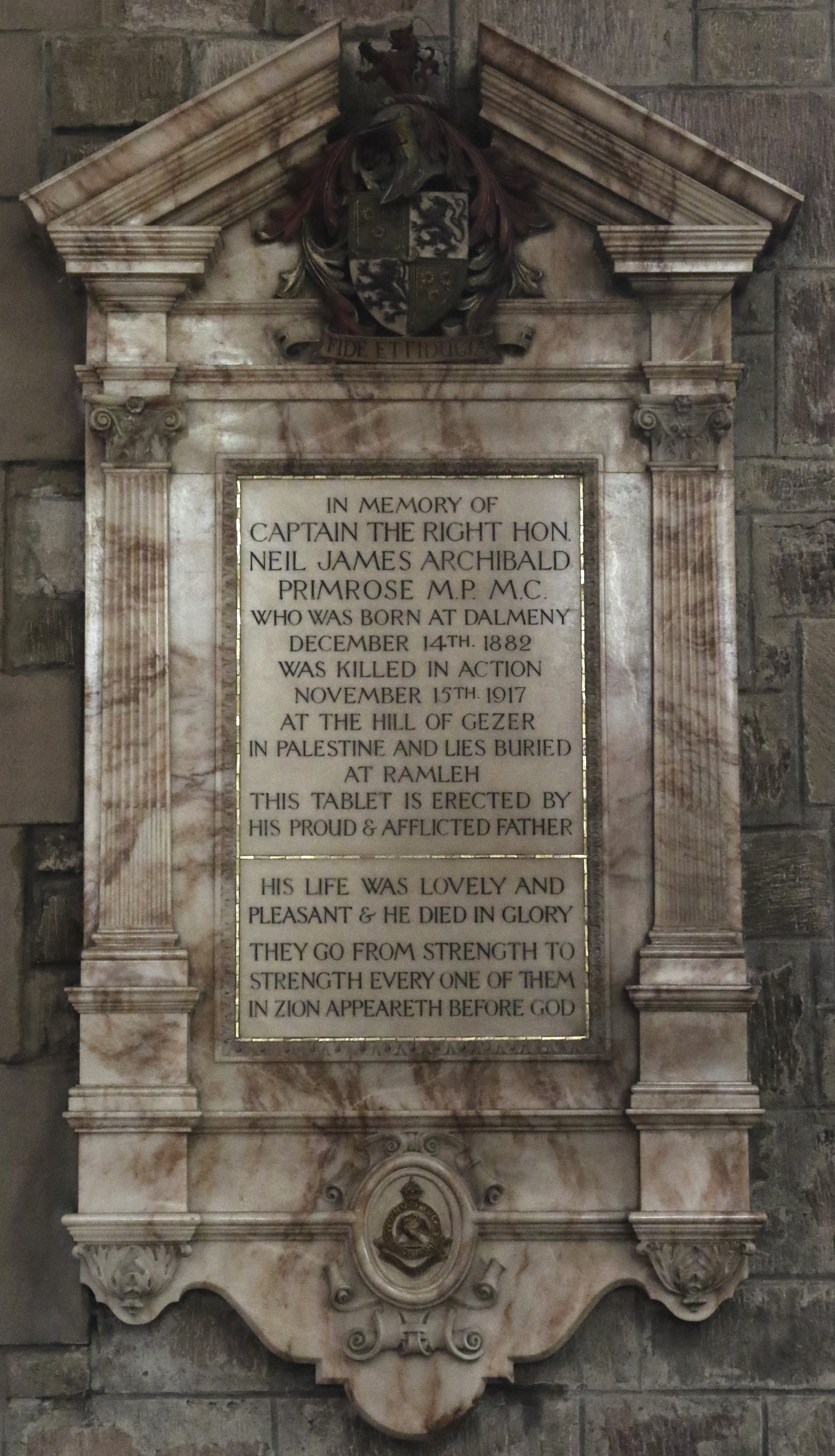
St Giles' Cathedral, Edinburgh (Note: In memory of CAPTAIN THE RIGHT HON. NEIL JAMES ARCHIBALD PRIMROSE M.P. M.C. who was born at Dalmeny December 14th 1882 was killed in action November 15, 1917 at the Hill of Gezer in Palestine and lies buried at Ramleh. This tablet is erected by his proud and afflicted father. His life was lovely and pleasant & he died in Glory. They go from strength to strength every one of them in Zion appeareth before God.)

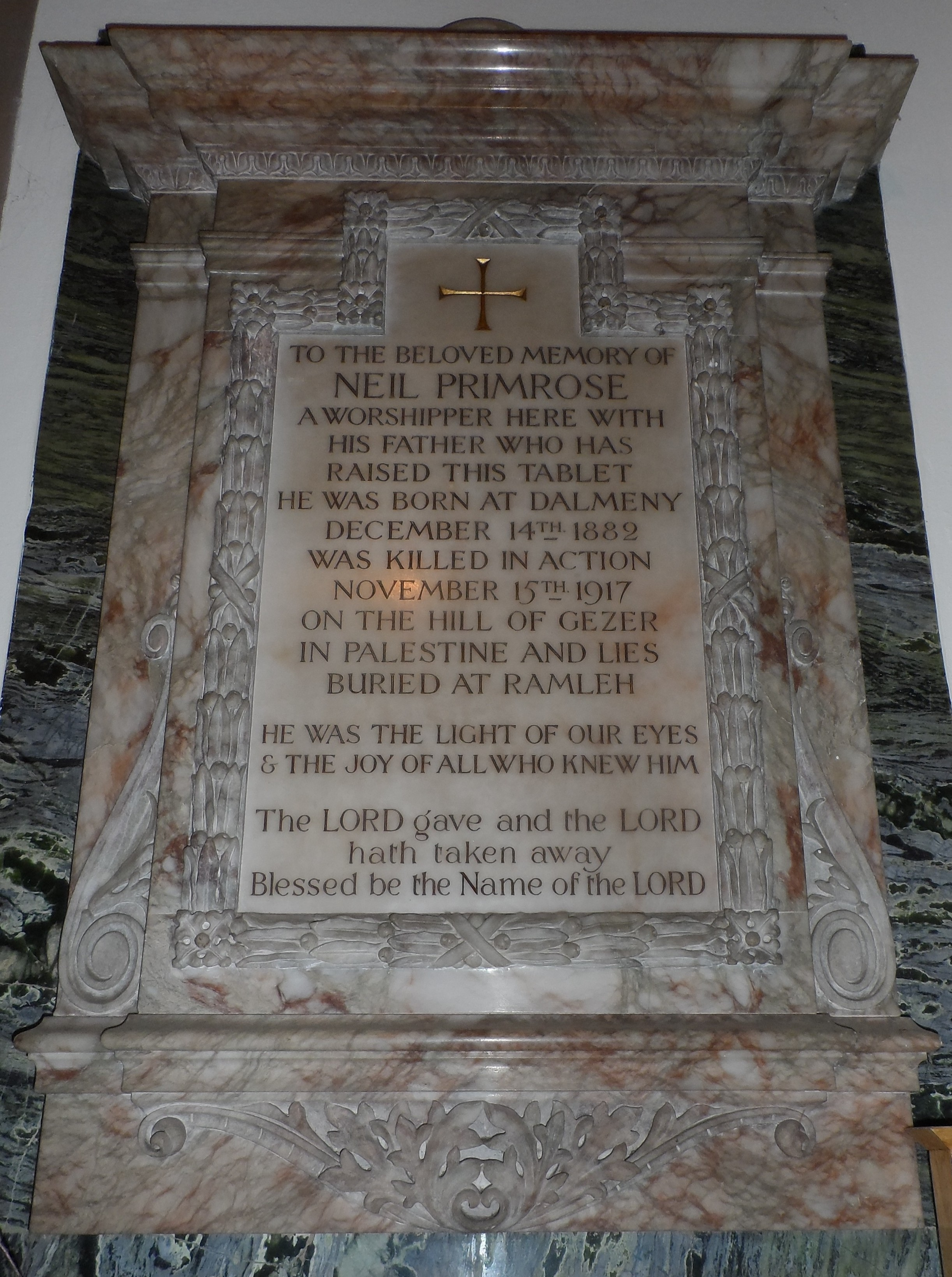
Christ Church, Epsom Common (Note: To the beloved memory of NEIL PRIMROSE a worshipper here with his father who has raised this tablet. He was born at Dalmeny December 14th 1892 was killed in action November 15th 1917 on the Hill of Gezer in Palestine and lies buried at Ramleh. He was the light of our eyes & the joy of all who knew him. The LORD gave and the LORD hath taken away. Blessed be the name of the LORD.)

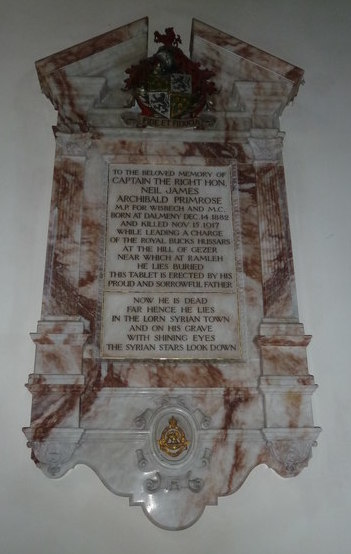
St Mary the Virgin, Mentmore (Note: To the beloved memory of CAPTAIN THE RIGHT HON. NEIL JAMES ARCHIBALD PRIMROSE M.P. for Wisbech and M.C. born at Dalmeny Dec 14 1882 and killed Nov 15 1917 while leading a charge of the Royal Bucks Hussars at the hill of Gezer near which at Ramleh he lies buried. This tablet is erected by his proud and sorrowful father. Now he is dead Far hence he lies In the lorn Syrian town And on his grave With shining eyes The Syrian stars look down.)

== Family ==
Primrose married Lady Victoria Stanley, daughter of Edward Stanley, 17th Earl of Derby, on 7 April 1915. They had one daughter: Ruth Alice Hannah Mary Primrose (18 April 1916 – 1989), who married Charles Wood, 2nd Earl of Halifax, on 25 April 1936.

Lady Victoria married as her second husband Malcolm Bullock, and had one daughter, Priscilla, by him. Lady Victoria died in a hunting accident in November 1927.

== Notes and references ==
Transcriptions

Parliament of the United Kingdom
Preceded by Cecil Beck	Member of Parliament for Wisbech; January 1910 – 1917	Succeeded by Colin Coote
Political offices
Preceded by Francis Acland	Under-Secretary of State for Foreign Affairs; 1915	Succeeded by Robert Cecil
Preceded by Edmund FitzAlan-Howard; John Gulland	Government Chief Whip in the House of Commons; Parliamentary Secretary to the Treasury; 1916–1917; With: Edmund FitzAlan-Howard	Succeeded by Edmund FitzAlan-Howard; Freddie Guest
Party political offices
New political party	Coalition Liberal Chief Whip; 1916–1917	Succeeded by Freddie Guest
