= G. D. H. Cole =

British historian, economist and writer (1889–1959)

- Born: George Douglas Howard Cole; 25 September 1889; Cambridge, England
- Died: 14 January 1959 (aged 69); London, England
- Education: Balliol College, Oxford
- Political party: Labour
- Other political affiliations: Popular Front
- Spouse: Margaret Cole (m. 1918)

Academic background
- Influences: John Neville Figgis: Sidney Webb

Academic work
- Discipline: Economics; political studies
- Sub-discipline: Co-operative economics; political theory
- School or tradition: Guild socialism
- Institutions: University College, Oxford; Nuffield College, Oxford
- Notable works: A History of Socialist Thought
- Influenced: Harold Wilson: Hugh Gaitskell

George Douglas Howard Cole (25 September 1889 – 14 January 1959) was an English political theorist, economist, historian, and novelist. As a believer in common ownership of the means of production, he theorised guild socialism (production organised through worker guilds). He belonged to the Fabian Society and was an advocate for the co-operative movement.

== Early life ==
Cole was born in Cambridge to George Cole, a jeweller who later became a surveyor; and his wife Jessie Knowles.

Cole was educated at St Paul's School and Balliol College, Oxford, where he achieved a First in Classical Moderations in 1910 and a First in Literae Humaniores ('Greats', a combination of Philosophy and Ancient History) in 1912.

== First World War and early career ==
In the autumn of 1912 Cole accepted a post as lecturer in philosophy at Armstrong College, Newcastle-upon-Tyne. Conditions were far from ideal, since Cole's students were mainly students studying technical subjects who attended his lectures merely because they were compulsory. In the same year, however, he was elected to a Prize Fellowship at Magdalen College, Oxford, which ran for seven years; he had an annual income of several hundred pounds and no obligation to teach. He could research and write.

Cole, personally a pacifist, took a pragmatic approach to the First World War. In 1915, however, he became an unpaid research officer at the Amalgamated Society of Engineers. He advised the union on how to respond to wartime legislation including the Munitions of War Act 1915. This role enabled him to escape conscription on the grounds that he was conducting work of national importance.

Cole's involvement in the campaign against conscription introduced him to a co-worker, Margaret Postgate, whom he married in 1918.

Having secured exemption from military service, Cole was practically active first with his union work and with journalism in defence of workers' rights; he also found time to develop a political theory of guild socialism. which had first engaged his attention during his undergraduate years.

Cole's Prize Fellowship ended in 1919. Needing employment, he moved to London. His first job, provided by Arthur Henderson, was as part-time secretary to the Advisory Committees which had been established by the Labour Party in 1918 to create a clear and comprehensive political programme, a programme for a full-fledged political party and not a pressure group. The work was congenial and satisfactory but the requirements of the job proved too much for Cole's part-time commitment.

He then secured a job with the Manchester Guardian as its Labour Correspondent. He did not stay with the paper for long. His wife commented:

he was not really at all fitted to be a regular journalist on a daily. Though his contributions were well informed and generally readable, and though, so far as my knowledge goes, their accuracy went unchallenged, he was quite incapable of giving to the Guardian that priority of service and attention which any good newspaperman must give to his paper; and I very clearly recollect the amazed exasperation displayed on more than one occasion by the London Editor, or the Night Editor as the case might be, when a piece of news requiring instant comment had turned up, and their Labour Correspondent was not available on the telephone, had gone out, nobody knew where, or for how long

== Professional life ==
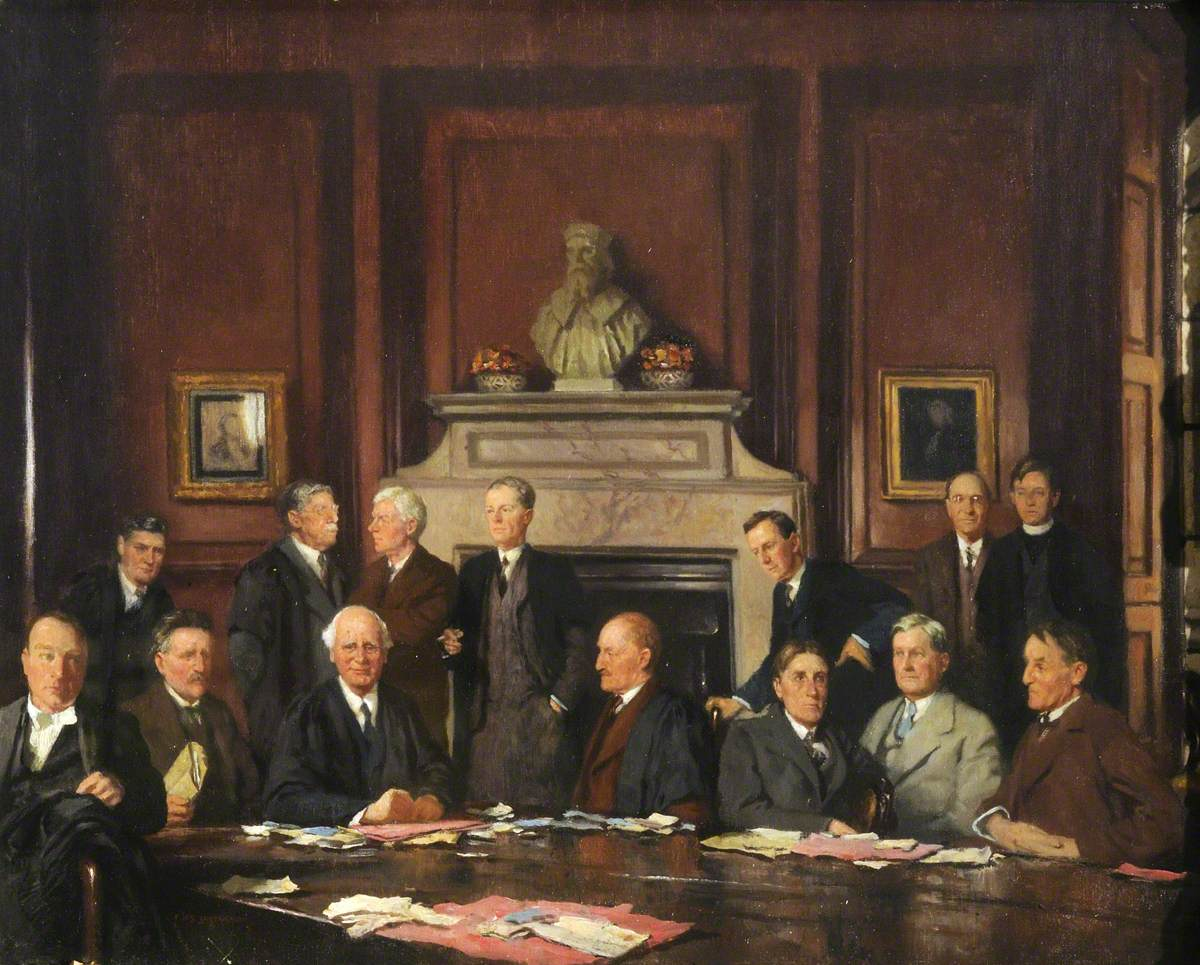
F. H. S. Shepherd, "University College Fellows", 1934: grouped under the college's bust of King Alfred are D. L. Keir, E. W. Ainley-Walker, A. D. Gardner, G. D. H. Cole, J. P. R. Maud, A. L. Goodhart, J. H. S. Wild, E. J. Bowen, A. B. Poynton, Sir Michael Sadler, A. S. L. Farquharson (in the centre), E. F. Carritt, G. H. Stevenson and K. K. M. Leys.

Cole authored several economic and historical works including biographies of William Cobbett and Robert Owen.

In 1925, he became reader in economics at University College, Oxford.

In 1929, he was appointed to the National Economic Advisory Council when it was set up by the second Labour government. In 1944, Cole became the first Chichele Professor of Social and Political Theory at Oxford. He was succeeded in the chair by Isaiah Berlin in 1957.

Cole's pacifism of 1914-18 was abandoned by 1940 when he said: "Hitler cured me of pacifism". During the 1930s, Cole sought to construct a British popular front against fascism. He identified the extent of the military threat before many of his colleagues had abandoned their pacifism. Cole lent strong support to the republican cause in the Spanish Civil War.

He was listed in Nazi Germany's Black Book of prominent subjects to be arrested in the case of a successful invasion of Britain.

In 1941, Cole was appointed sub-warden of Nuffield College, Oxford. He was central to the establishment of the Nuffield College Social Reconstruction Survey which collected a large amount of demographic, economic and social data. This information was used to advocate for an extensive programme of social reform.

== Socialism ==
Cole became interested in Fabianism while studying at Balliol College, Oxford. He joined the Fabian Society's executive under the sponsorship of Sidney Webb. Cole became a principal proponent of guild socialist ideas, a libertarian socialist alternative to Marxian political economy. These ideas he put forward in The New Age before and during the First World War and also in the pages of The New Statesman, the weekly founded by the Beatrice Webb and George Bernard Shaw.

Cole said his interest in socialism was kindled by his reading News from Nowhere, the utopian novel by William Morris, writing:

I became a Socialist because, as soon as the case for a society of equals, set free from the twin evils of riches and poverty, mastership and subjection, was put to me, I knew that to be the only kind of society that could be consistent with human decency and fellowship and that in no other society could I have the right to be content.

— World Socialism Restated

Neither a Marxist nor a social democrat, Cole envisioned a guild socialism of decentralised association and active, participatory democracy, whose basic units would be sited at the workplace and in the community rather than in any central apparatus of the state. Cole criticized both state socialism and syndicalism as leaving open the possibility of tyranny, and envisioned a form of socialism where all enterprises would be democratically run by the workers through trade unions with the state remaining to guarantee consumers' rights and civil liberties. Cole's ideas were influential in intellectual circles but were generally dismissed by Labour Party leaders such as Ramsay MacDonald.

In the 1920s, Hugh Gaitskell, a student of Cole, became active supporter of the 1926 United Kingdom general strike. Cole also was a powerful influence on the life of the young Harold Wilson, whom he taught, worked with and convinced to join the Labour Party.

Cole formed the Society for Socialist Inquiry and Propaganda to advance his views, which combined with former members of the Independent Labour Party defecting to the mainstream Labour Party after its disaffiliation to form the Socialist League in 1932. In 1936, Cole began calling for a popular front movement in Britain in which the Labour Party would ally with other political parties against appeasement and the threat of fascism.

Cole wrote at least seven books for the Left Book Club, all of which were published by Victor Gollancz Ltd. They are marked with LBC in the list of his books given below. He and his wife, Margaret Cole, together wrote 29 popular detective stories, featuring the investigators Superintendent Wilson, Everard Blatchington and Dr. Tancred. Cole and his wife created a partnership but not a marriage. Cole took little interest in sex and he regarded women as a distraction for men. Margaret documented this comprehensively in a biography she wrote of her husband after his death.

Although Cole admired the Soviet Union for creating a socialist economy, he rejected its dictatorial government as a model for socialist societies elsewhere. In a 1939 lecture, Cole stated:

If I do not accept Stalin's answer, it is because I am not prepared to write off Democratic Socialism, despite all its failures and vacillations of recent years, as a total loss.... Democratic Socialism offers the only means of building the new order on what is valuable and worth preserving in the civilisation of to-day.

In his book Europe, Russia and the Future published in 1941, Cole claimed that however immoral the new Nazi-dominated Europe was in some ways it was better than the "impracticable" system of sovereign states that had preceded it. In economic terms, it could be said that "it would be better to let Hitler conquer all Europe short of the Soviet Union, and thereafter exploit it ruthlessly in the Nazi interest, than to go back to the pre-war order of independent Nation States with frontiers drawn so as to cut right across the natural units of production and exchange". Cole also stated:

I would much sooner see the Soviet Union, even with its policy unchanged, dominant over all Europe, including Great Britain, than see an attempt to restore the pre-war States to their futile and uncreative independence and their petty economic nationalism under capitalist domination. Much better be ruled by Stalin than by the destructive and monopolistic cliques which dominate Western capitalism.

== Co-operative studies ==
Cole was also a theorist of the co-operative movement and made a number of contributions to the fields of co-operative studies, co-operative economics and the history of the co-operative movement. In particular, his book The British Co-operative Movement in a Socialist Society examined the economic status of the English CWS (the predecessor of the modern Co-operative Group), evaluated its possibility of achieving a Co-operative Commonwealth without state assistance and hypothesised what the role the co-operative might have in a socialist state.

A second book, titled A Century of Co-operation, examined the history of the movement from the very first co-operatives to the contribution of the Chartists and Robert Owen, through to the Rochdale Pioneers as well as the movement's development (in Great Britain) over the following century.

Cole contributed to An Outline of Modern Knowledge, ed. William Rose (Victor Gollancz, 1931) along with other leading authorities of the time, including Roger Fry, C. G. Seligman, Maurice Dobb and F. J. C. Hearnshaw.

== Personal life ==
In August 1918, Cole married Margaret Isabel Postgate (1893–1980). Margaret was the daughter of the classical scholar John Percival Postgate.

The couple had one son and two daughters in a marriage that lasted forty-one years. However, the marriage does not seem to have been especially happy. Cole expressed little interest in actual romantic attachment and even less in sexual relations. Friends observed that emotional attachments tended to be with men rather than women. Cole was very fond of some of his male students. They included the future leader of the Labour Party Hugh Gaitskell. There is no evidence of any homosexual encounters either before or during his marriage.

Cole and his wife jointly wrote a number of books and articles, including twenty-nine detective stories.

Cole could not accept the idea of a "determinate human superior". His wife recalled that "he... never gave orders except in a purely routine and non-significant sense". His dislike of all forms of hierarchy and hatred of ritual led to atheism at an early age, though he never engaged in anti-religious polemics. While no luddite, he greatly admired everything produced by William Morris including his affection for the Cotswolds. Though he enjoyed classical music, he regarded the radio as making a horrible noise Almost allergic to higher mathematics (he did not understand Algebra) he distrusted science, as he believed it was being used to quantify things that were best left to interpretation.

In literature and poetry he enjoyed (after Morris) Defoe, Swift, William Wordsworth, Walt Whitman, Henry James, William Cobbett, Bertrand Russell, George Bernard Shaw and Samuel Butler, but he found Edmund Burke and Thomas Carlyle pretentious. He disliked the "imperialism" of Shakespeare and hated D. H. Lawrence.

He was admired by his students, but Gaitskell said he was much too sensitive, self-critical and sardonic to play the part of the master at all willingly.

In the spring of 1929 the Coles returned to London, living in West Hampstead for six years until buying a "rambling Victorian" house called "Freeland" in Hendon where he lived for most of the last three decades of his life. In early 1957 he and his wife moved to a flat in Holland Park, Kensington. He died after going into a diabetic coma in the early hours of 14 January 1959 in hospital in Hampstead. In lieu of religious rites his brother-in-law, Raymond Postgate, read two passages from the works of William Morris at his funeral in Golders Green Crematorium. His estate was offered for probate at £46,617 (equivalent to £1,097,364 in 2020).

== Bibliography ==
=== Non-fiction works ===
- The World of Labour (1913, revised 1920)
- Labour in War Time (1915)
- Trade Unionism on the Railways (1917) [with R. Page Arnot]
- Self-Government in Industry (1917, revised 1920)
- The Payment of Wages (1918)
- The Regulation of Wages During and After the War (1918)
- An Introduction to Trade Unionism (1918)
- Labour in the Commonwealth(1919)
- Social Theory (1920)
- Guild Socialism Restated (1920)
- Chaos and Order in Industry (1920)
- Guild Socialism - A plan for Economic Democracy (1921)
- The Future of Local Government (1921)
- Rousseau's Social Contract and Discourses edited and translated in Everyman's Library (1923)
- Robert Owen (1923)
- Workshop Organisation (1923)
- Trade Unionism and Munitions (1923)
- The Life of William Cobbett (1925)
- The Life of Robert Owen (1925, second ed. 1930, third ed. 1965)
- The next ten years in British social and economic policy (1929)
- Some Essentials of Socialist Propaganda (1932)
- The Intelligent Man's Guide through World Chaos (1932)
- The Intelligent Man's Review of Europe Today (1933) [with Margaret Cole]
- Studies in World Economics (1934)
- What Marx Really Meant (1934)
- Principles of Economic Planning (1935)
- Planned Socialism: The Plan du Travail of the Belgian Labour Party, drawn up and explained by Henri de Man, translated and edited by G. D. H. Cole (London: New Fabian Research Bureau, pamphlet 25, December 1935)
- The Condition of Britain (Left Book Club, 1937) [with Margaret Cole]
- The People's Front (Left Book Club, 1937)
- Practical Economics(Penguin Books, 1937)
- Persons & Periods (1938)
- Socialism in Evolution (1938) Pelican
- British Trade Unionism To-day. A Survey (1939)
- The War on the Home Front (1939)
- War Aims (Left Book Club, 1939)
- Europe, Russia and the Future (Left Book Club, 1941)
- British Working Class Politics 1832-1914 (1941)
- Great Britain in the Post-War World (Left Book Club, 1942)
- The Fabian Society, Past and Present (1942)
- Fabian Socialism (1943)
- Monetary Systems and Theories (1943)
- The Means to Full Employment (Left Book Club, 1943)
- A Century of Cooperation (1944)
- Money: Its Present And Future (1944)
- The Common People, 1746–1946 (1946) [with Raymond Postgate]
- A Short History of the British Working Class Movement, 1789–1947 (1947) ISBN 0-415-26564-9
- An Intelligent Man's Guide to the Post-War World (1947)
- Samuel Butler and The Way of All Flesh (London: Home & Van Thal, 1947)
- A History of the Labour Party from 1914 (London: Routledge & K. Paul, 1948)
- The Meaning of Marxism (1948; a rewrite of What Marx Really Meant)
- Consultation or Joint Management? (1949)
- Labour's Second Term (1949)
- The Meaning of Marxism (1950)
- The British Co-operative Movement in a Socialist Society, (London, Allen & Unwin 1951)
- Introduction to Economic History 1750–1950 (London: Macmillan 1952)
- A History of Socialist Thought (five "volumes" in seven "parts", Macmillan, 1953 to 1961; reissued, Palgrave Macmillan, 2003) ISBN 1-4039-0264-X
- Studies in Class Structure (London, Routledge and Kegan Paul 1955)
- Capitalism in the Modern World (1957)
- Early Pamphlets and Assessment (2011, originally published between 1921 and 1956)

=== Novels and short story collections ===
==== G D H Cole ====
- The Brooklyn Murders (1923)

==== G D H and M Cole ====
- The Death of a Millionaire (1925)
- The Blatchington Tangle (1926); serialised in The Daily Herald (1926)
- The Murder at Crome House (1927)
- The Man from the River (1928)
- Superintendent Wilson's Holiday (1928)
- Poison in the Garden Suburb (1929); serialised in The Daily Herald (1929). Also known as Poison in a Garden Suburb
- Burglars in Bucks (1930) aka The Berkshire Mystery
- Corpse in Canonicals (1930) aka The Corpse in the Constable's Garden
- The Great Southern Mystery (1931) aka The Walking Corpse
- Dead Man's Watch (1931)
- Death of a Star (1932)
- A Lesson in Crime (1933)
  - A Lesson in Crime; A Question of Coincidence; Mr. Steven's Insurance Policy; Blackmail in the Village; The Cliff Path Ghost; Sixteen Years Run; Wilson Calling (Wilson); The Brentwardine Mystery; The Mother of the Detective; A Dose of Cyanide; Superintendent Wakley's Mistake.
- The Affair at Aliquid (1933)
- End of an Ancient Mariner (1933)
- Death in the Quarry (1934)
- Big Business Murder (1935)
- Dr Tancred Begins (1935)
- Scandal at School (1935) aka The Sleeping Death
- Last Will and Testament (1936)
- The Brothers Sackville (1936)
- Disgrace to the College (1937)
- The Missing Aunt (1937)
- Mrs Warrender's Profession (1938)
- Off with her Head! (1938)
- Double Blackmail (1939)
- Greek Tragedy (1939)
- Wilson and Some Others (1940)
  - Death in a Tankard (Wilson); Murder in Church (Wilson); The Bone of the Dinosaur (Wilson); A Tale of Two Suitcases (Wilson); The Motive (Wilson); Glass (Wilson); Murder in Broad Daylight (Wilson); Ye Olde Englysshe Christmasse or Detection in the Eighteenth Century; The Letters; The Partner; A Present from the Empire; The Strange Adventures of a Chocolate Box; Strychnine Tonic.
- Murder at the Munition Works (1940)
- Counterpoint Murder (1940)
- Knife in the Dark (1941)
- Toper's End (1942)
- Death of a Bride (1945)
- Birthday Gifts (1946)
- The Toys of Death (1948)

=== Radio plays ===
==== G D H and M Cole ====
- Murder in Broad Daylight. BBC Home Service, 1 June 1934
- The Bone of the Dinosaur. (Detection Club: Series 1, Episode 6). BBC Home Service, 23 and 27 November 1940

=== Short stories ===
==== G D H and Margaret Cole ====
- Death in the Tankard. (London) Daily News, 15 to 19 January 1934
- Too Clever by Half. (London) Daily News, 20 to 24 April 1936

== Sources ==
- Margaret Cole, The Life of G. D. H. Cole, Macmillan/St. Martin's (1971) ISBN 0-333-00216-4
- A. W. (Tony) Wright, G. D. H. Cole and Socialist Democracy New York, Oxford (1979) ISBN 0-19-827421-1
- L. P. Carpenter, G.D.H. Cole: An Intellectual Biography, Cambridge (1974) ISBN 0-521-08702-3
- Chris Wyatt, "A Recipe for a Cookshop of the Future: G. D. H. Cole and the Conundrum of Sovereignty" Capital and Class 90 (2006)

Party political offices
Preceded by Viscount Addison	Chairman of the New Fabian Research Bureau; 1937–1939	Office abolished
New office	Chairman of the Fabian Society; 1937–1946	Succeeded by Harold Laski
Preceded by Harold Laski	Chairman of the Fabian Society; 1948–1950	Succeeded by John Parker
Preceded by Stafford Cripps	President of the Fabian Society; 1952–1959	Succeeded by Margaret Cole
Academic offices
New office	Chichele Professor of Social and Political Theory; 1944–1957	Succeeded by Isaiah Berlin
