= F. H. S. Shepherd =

Frederick Hawkesworth Sinclair Shepherd (1877 – 28 May 1948), usually known as F. H. S. Shepherd, was an English painter of portraits, landscapes, and interiors.

== Early life ==
The son of the Rev. Frederick Shepherd, Vicar of Stoke under Ham, Somerset, Shepherd was educated at Rugby School, Corpus Christi College, Oxford, and finally from 1898 to 1902 at the Slade School of Fine Art, where he was taught by Frederick Brown.

== Career ==
Shepherd became a painter of portraits, landscapes, interiors, and still life. He exhibited at the Royal Academy and the New English Art Club, where he was elected a member in 1912 and later served as secretary. He became an associate member of the Société Nationale des Beaux-Arts and was appointed by the king of Belgium as a knight of the Order of the Crown.

In 1934, Shepherd was commissioned to paint a "conversation piece", a group portrait of the dons of University College, Oxford.

When Shepherd died in May 1948, an obituary in The Times said of him that "His work was distinguished by good taste in feeling, colour, and arrangement, and virtuosity in execution." A memorial exhibition of his paintings and watercolours was mounted at the Beaux Arts Gallery in 1949

== Personal life ==
In 1930 Shepherd married Charlotte, a daughter of G. H. Wollaston, but they had no children.

At the time of his death in May 1948, Shepherd and his wife were living in Paultons Square, Chelsea. He left an estate valued at £13,062.

== Books illustrated ==
- Flora Macdonald Mayor (writing as Mary Strafford), Mrs Hammond's Children, illustrated by Alice Strafford and F. H. S. Shepherd (1901)

== Gallery ==
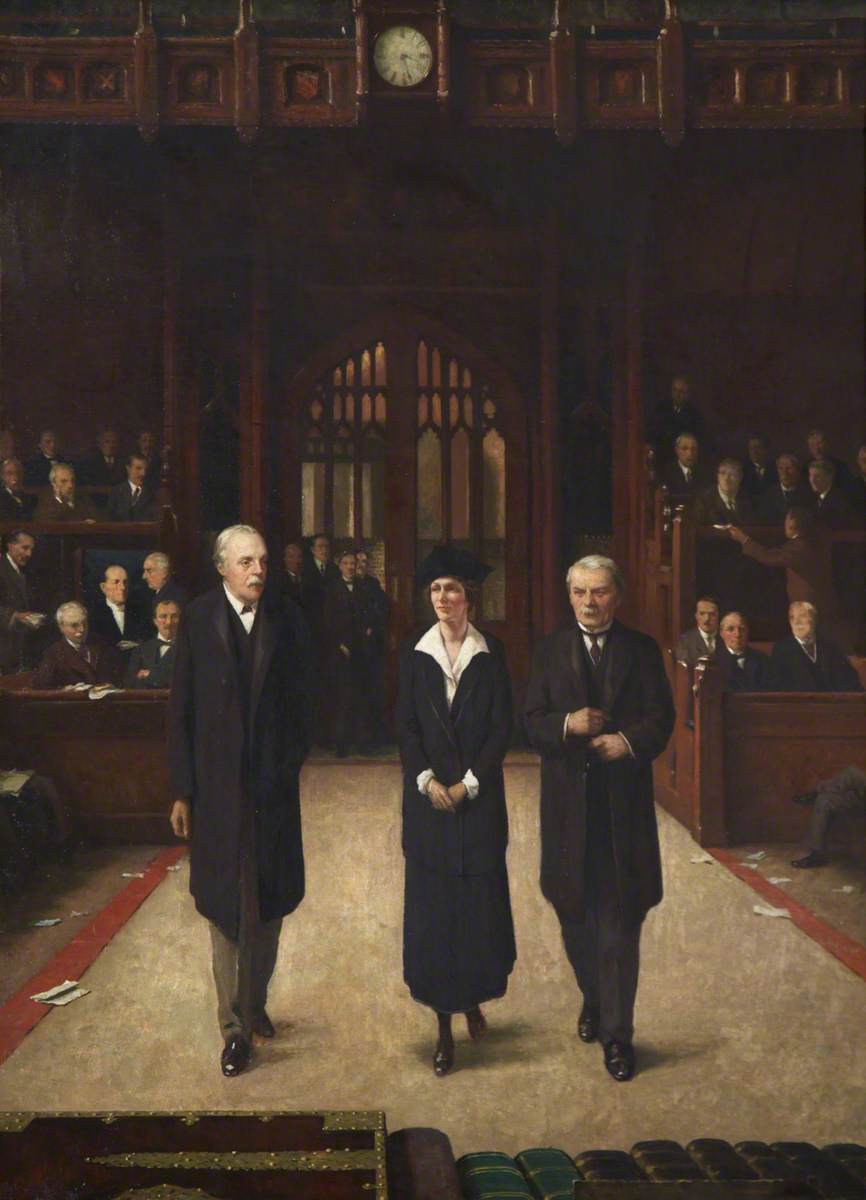
Lady Astor Being Introduced into the House of Commons by Lloyd George

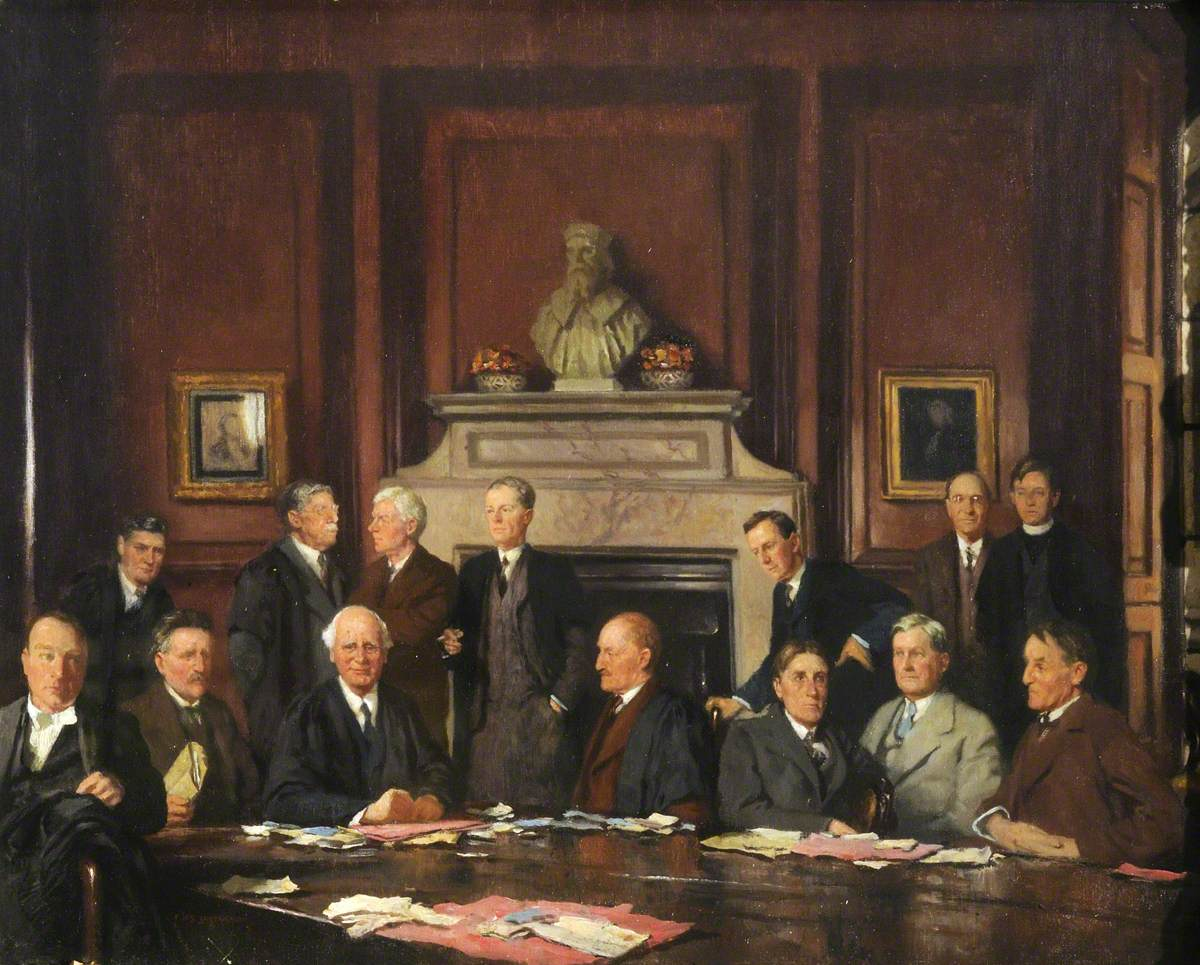
"University College Fellows", 1934: grouped under the college's bust of King Alfred are D. L. Keir, E. W. Ainley-Walker, A. D. Gardner, G. D. H. Cole, J. P. R. Maud, A. L. Goodhart, J. H. S. Wild, E. J. Bowen, A. B. Poynton, Sir Michael Sadler, A. S. L. Farquharson, E. F. Carritt, G. H. Stevenson and K. K. M. Leys.

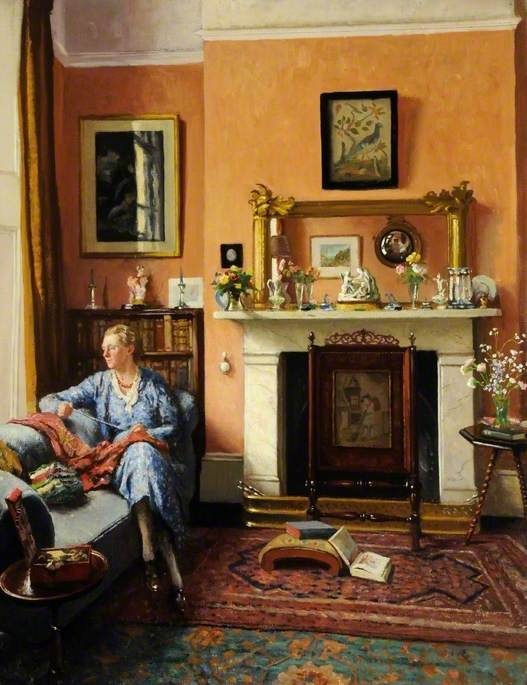

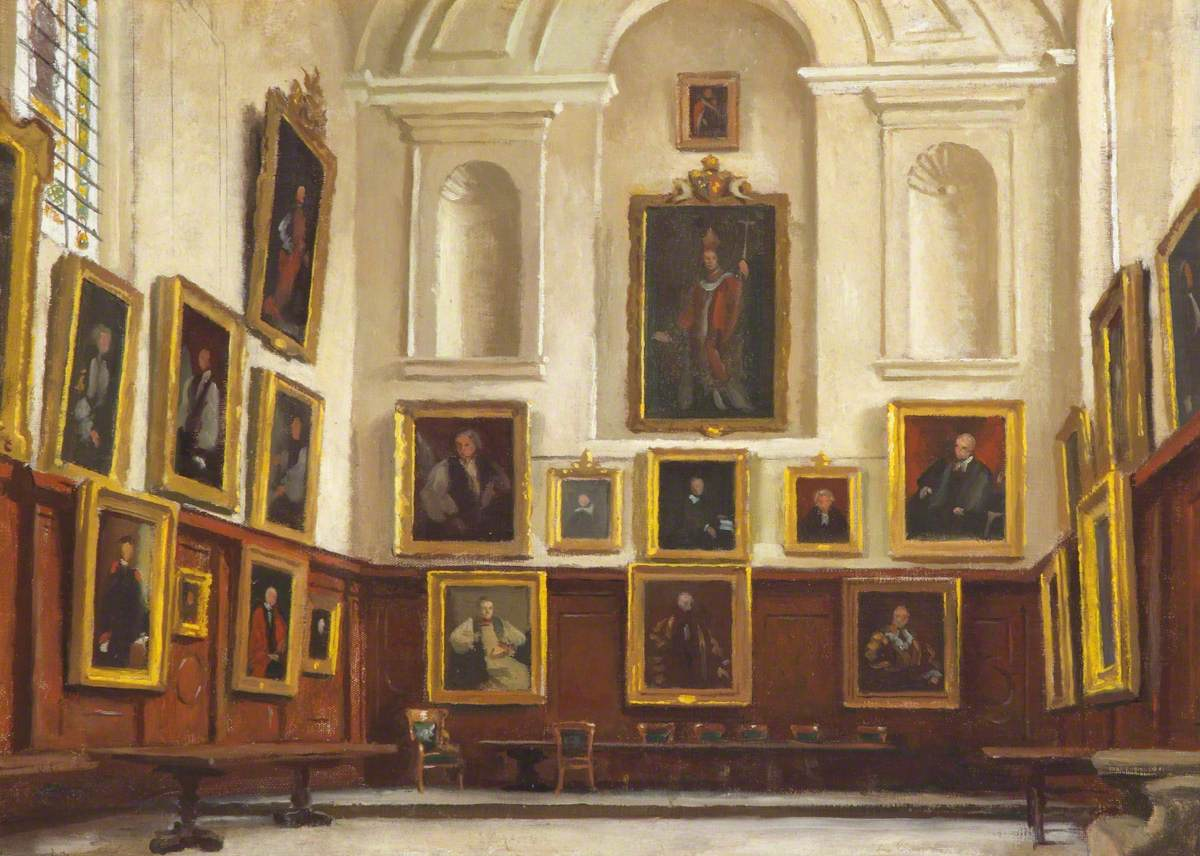
Hall of All Souls College

== Catalogues ==
- T. Field, The Interior Pictures and Landscapes of F. H. S. Shepherd (Tours Deslis, undated)
- Landscapes in Water Colour by F. H. S. Shepherd (London: Chenil Gallery, 1911)
- F. H. S. Shepherd: Interiors, Still Life, Studies in Italy, Etc. (Goupil Gallery, 1923)
- English and Italian Watercolours By F. H. S. Shepherd (P. & D. Colnaghi & Co., 1933)
- Memorial Exhibition of Paintings and Water-colours by the Late F. H. S. Shepherd (London: Beaux Arts Gallery, 1949)
