= David Keir (historian) =

British historian and Master of Balliol College, Oxford (1895–1973)

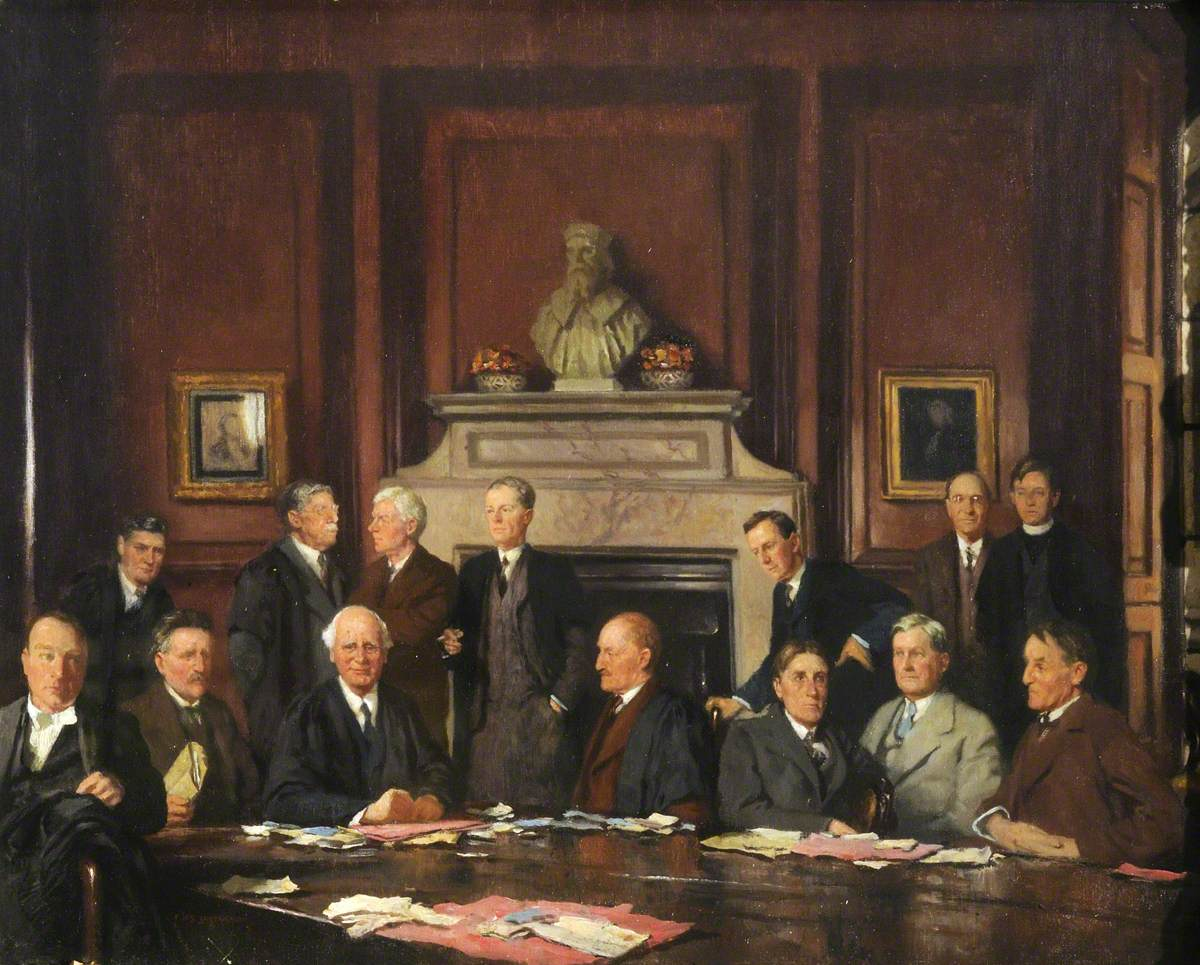
F. H. S. Shepherd, "University College Fellows", 1934: grouped under the college's bust of King Alfred are D. L. Keir, E. W. Ainley-Walker, A. D. Gardner, G. D. H. Cole, J. P. R. Maud, A. L. Goodhart, J. H. S. Wild, E. J. Bowen, A. B. Poynton, Sir Michael Sadler, A. S. L. Farquharson (in the centre), E. F. Carritt, G. H. Stevenson and K. K. M. Leys.

Sir David Lindsay Keir (22 May 1895 – 2 October 1973) was a British historian and educator. From 1949 to 1965, he was Master of Balliol College, Oxford.

== Life ==
Keir was born at Bellingham, Northumberland, the eldest of six children to William Keir and Elizabeth (Craig) Keir. His Scottish father was a Presbyterian minister, originally from Aberuthven, and moved several times during Keir's childhood, from Bellingham to Newcastle, Birkenhead, and finally Glasgow, where Keir attended the Glasgow Academy, an independent school.

In 1913, he began a degree at Glasgow University, but the First World War interrupted his studies and he was commissioned as a lieutenant in the King's Own Scottish Borderers. He rose to the rank of captain. He was wounded twice, once on the Somme and once at Arras. In 1919, he also served in Southern Ireland. After the war, he returned to university, at New College, Oxford, where he studied history, obtaining a first class degree in 1921.

Keir was elected a Fellow of University College in 1921, and served as a very young Dean 1925 to 1935. From 1931 until 1939, he lectured in English Constitutional History. He was a visiting tutor at Harvard in 1923–24.

In 1939, he was appointed president and vice-chancellor of Queen's University, Belfast, where he remained until 1949. In this role, he was responsible for a major expansion of the university from 1945 to 1949. Keir received a knighthood in 1946, for his service at Queen's University. In 1959, a building of the extended Queen's University campus, the David Keir Building, was named after him.

From 1942 to 1949, he was Chairman of the Northern Ireland Regional Hospitals Board.

In 1949, Keir was elected Master of Balliol College, Oxford, bringing him back to England. He stayed in that position until retirement in 1965.

He died at home at Boar's Hill in Oxford on 2 October 1973.

== Family ==
He married Anna Clunie Dale, daughter of Robert John Dale, a Montreal shipping underwriter, in 1930. They had one son and one daughter.

== Publications ==
- Cases in Constitutional Law (1928)
- The Constitutional History of Modern Britain (1938)

Academic offices
Preceded by Sir Frederick Wolff Ogilvie	President and Vice-Chancellor of Queen's University Belfast; 1939–1949	Succeeded by Lord Ashby of Brandon
Preceded by Alexander Dunlop Lindsay	Master of Balliol College, Oxford; 1949–1965	Succeeded by Christopher Hill
