= Arthur Blackburne Poynton =

A. B. Poynton
- Born: Arthur Blackburne Poynton; 28 June 1867; Kelston, Somerset, England
- Died: 8 October 1944 (aged 77)

Academic background
- Education: Marlborough College
- Alma mater: Balliol College, Oxford

Academic work
- Discipline: Classics
- Sub-discipline: Rhetoric; Isocrates; Cicero
- Institutions: Hertford College, Oxford; University College, Oxford
- Notable students: C. S. Lewis; E. R. Dodds

Arthur Blackburne Poynton (28 June 1867 – 8 October 1944) was an English classical scholar. He was a Fellow and later Master of University College, Oxford.

== Early life and family ==
Poynton was born in Kelston, Somerset, the son of the Rev. Francis John Poynton (1831–1903) and Frances Mary Billinge (1837–1930). He was educated at Marlborough College and went up to Balliol College, Oxford, in 1885.

In 1896 he married Mary Sargent (1867–1952), the daughter of John Young Sargent, a Fellow of Hertford College. They had two sons (the classical scholar John Blackburne Poynton (1900–1995) and the civil servant Sir Arthur Hilton Poynton (1905–1996)) and three daughters.

== Career ==
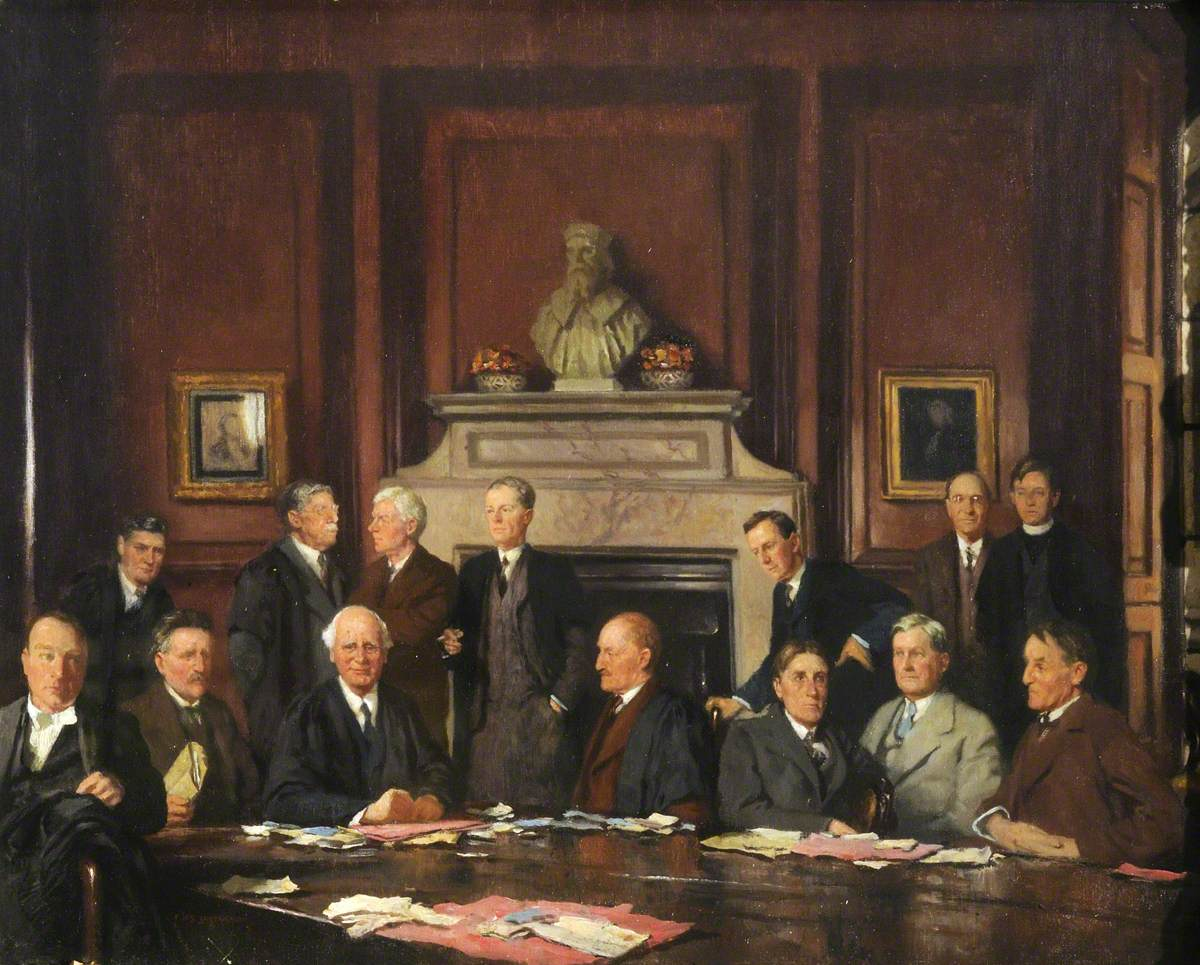
F. H. S. Shepherd, "University College Fellows", 1934: grouped under the college's bust of King Alfred are D. L. Keir, E. W. Ainley-Walker, A. D. Gardner, G. D. H. Cole, J. P. R. Maud, A. L. Goodhart, J. H. S. Wild, E. J. Bowen, A. B. Poynton, Sir Michael Sadler, A. S. L. Farquharson (in the centre), E. F. Carritt, G. H. Stevenson and K. K. M. Leys.

Poynton was a fellow of Hertford College, Oxford, from 1889 to 1894. In 1894, he was elected a fellow and tutor of University College, Oxford, where he would spend the rest of his career. At University College, he was a tutor to the author and academic C. S. Lewis from 1919 to 1920 and the classical scholar E. R. Dodds. He also served as bursar of University College from 1900 to 1935, and its Master from 1935 to 1937. He retired from Oxford in 1937, and was made an honorary fellow of his old college.

He was Public Orator at the University of Oxford for seven years, from 1925 to 1932. He delivered the oration for Albert Einstein at his honorary degree ceremony in the Sheldonian Theatre on 23 May 1931.

Poynton died on 8 October 1944 as the result of a motor car crash in the High Street at Oxford.

Academic offices
Preceded by Michael Ernest Sadler	Master of University College, Oxford; 1935–1937	Succeeded by William Henry Beveridge
