= A. S. L. Farquharson =

British classicist and translator

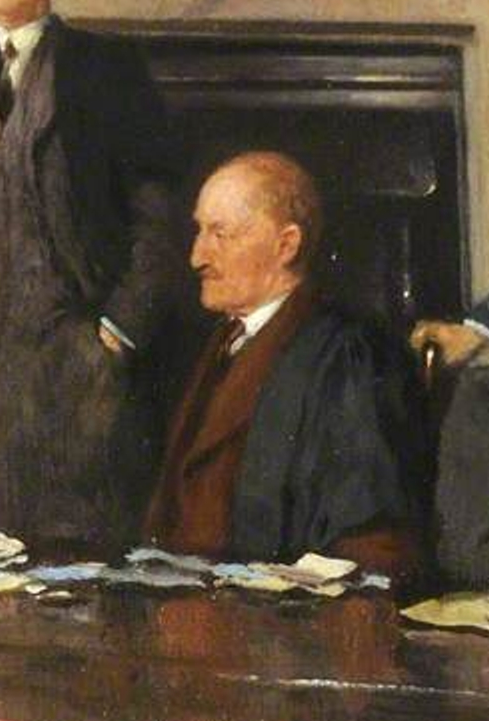
- Born: Arthur Spencer Loat Farquharson; 22 November 1871; Alverstoke, Hampshire, England
- Died: 5 August 1942 (aged 70)
- Occupation: Academic
- Years active: 1899–1942

Academic background
- Education: University College, Oxford
- Academic advisor: J. Cook Wilson

Academic work
- Era: 20th century
- Discipline: Classical scholar
- Sub-discipline: Translator
- Institutions: University College, Oxford
- Notable works: Translation of Meditations

Arthur Spencer Loat Farquharson (1871–1942), usually cited as A. S. L. Farquharson, was a British classicist, translator, and Dean of University College, Oxford. His best-known work is the translation of Marcus Aurelius' book Meditations.

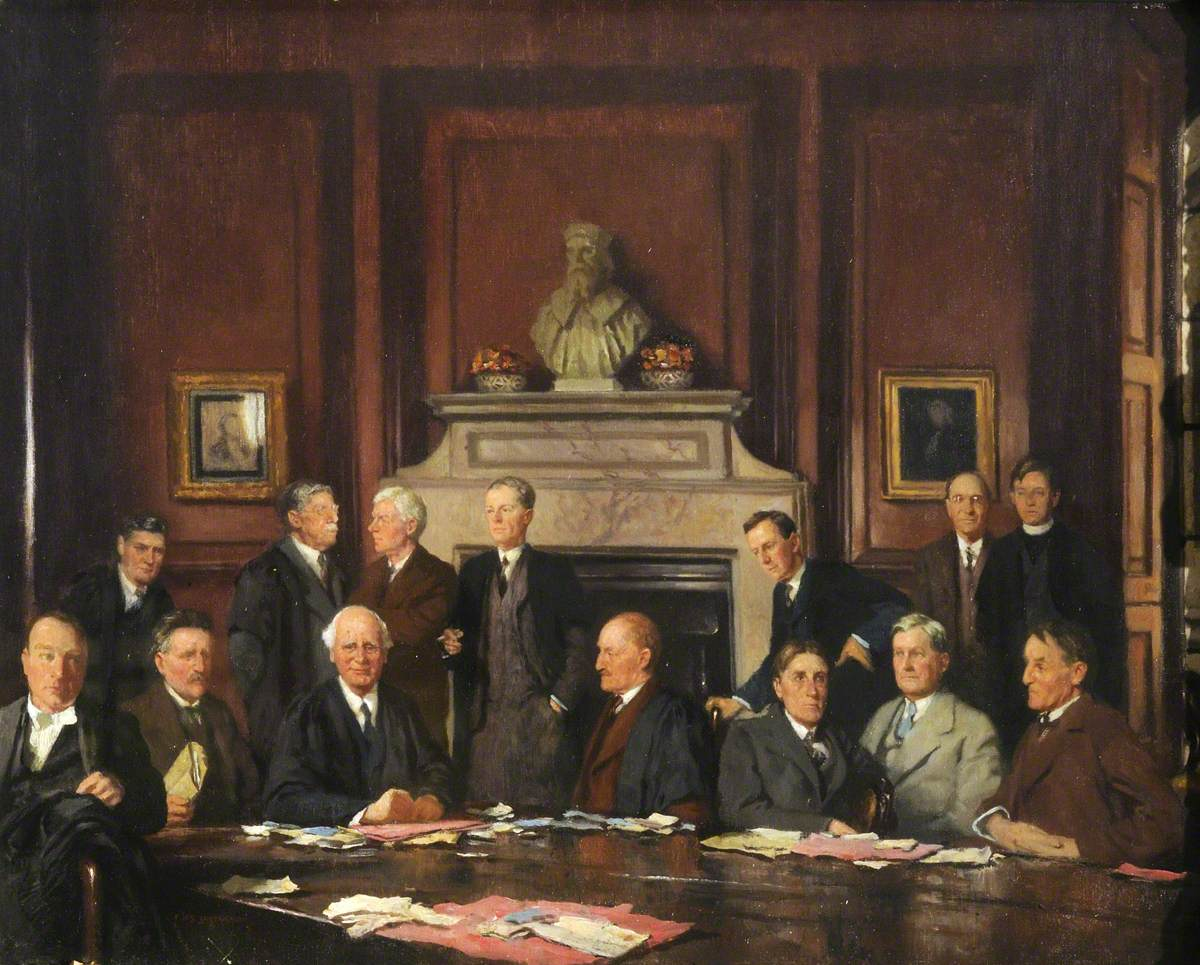
F. H. S. Shepherd, "University College Fellows", 1934: grouped under the college's bust of King Alfred are D. L. Keir, E. W. Ainley-Walker, A. D. Gardner, G. D. H. Cole, J. P. R. Maud, A. L. Goodhart, J. H. S. Wild, E. J. Bowen, A. B. Poynton, Sir Michael Sadler, A. S. L. Farquharson (in the centre), E. F. Carritt, G. H. Stevenson, and K. K. M. Leys.

== Biography ==
Arthur Farquharson was born in 1871. He studied at University College, Oxford from 1890 to 1894, where he "obtained a First both in Mods in 1892 and in Finals in 1894". He was a fellow of the college from 1899 to 1942. He was a Dean and read lectures in logic. He participated in revising A Greek–English Lexicon of Liddell and Scott. His best-known work is the translation of Marcus Aurelius' book, Meditations. His translations of Aristotle's Progression of Animals and Movement of Animals were published in 1913.

The Oxford-based writer C. S. Lewis described his encounter with Farquharson in a letter of 26 January 1930 to his friend Arthur Greeves:

On the strength of having done some office work at Whitehall during the war, and having been in the Territorials before, he has called himself Lieutenant Colonel ever since. He lives in a tall, narrow house, cheek by jowl with Univ. Library which itself is like a mortuary chapel. The space between them is about six feet across; into the Fark’s house daylight never comes. I have never been beyond the ground floor: here in broad low rooms, lined with books, he works by artificial light most of the day. Somewhere, upstairs, is a wife one never meets. He came gliding towards me in the dusk, about five feet four inches high, his face exactly like an egg in shape, with sandy-hair fringing a bald patch, a little military moustache, and eyebrows so far up his forehead that it gives him a perpetual air of astonishment. [...] It is an old subject of controversy just how mad the Fark is.

Farquharson was also a Colonel in the Territorial Army.

Meditations translated by Farquharson

== Meditations ==
Farquharson worked on the translation of Meditations of the Roman emperor Marcus Aurelius for many years. The edition was of two volumes. The first volume contained translation and Greek text on opposite pages, and the second one was a lengthy commentary on the text. The book was published during World War II, after Farquharson's death in 1942. The edition was prepared by Major John Sparrow and David Rees, and published in 1944.

Farquharson's translation was received positively by reviewers. It was called "clear and graceful translation ... [that] contains a magnificent collection of illustrative and parallel passages from writers of all ages". Another reviewer noted that "[t]here has probably been no scholar of recent times better fitted to edit and interpret the meditations of the Stoic Emperor than the late Dr. Farquharson" and that "the new translation is nearly flawless". Another reviewer called it "monumental and beautiful work" that "promises to be the standard edition and commentary of Marcus for a long time to come".

== Publications ==
- Farquharson, A. S. L. (1984). "Progression of Animals". In Barnes, Jonathan (ed.). Complete Works of Aristotle, Volume 1: The Revised Oxford Translation. Princeton University Press. pp. 1097–1110. doi:10.1515/9781400835843-027. ISBN 978-0691016504.
- Farquharson, A. S. L., ed. (1926). Statement and Inference and other Philosophical Papers by John Cook Wilson. Two volumes. Clarendon Press.
- Farquharson, A. S. L. (1937). Movement of Animals. Loeb Classical Library. doi:10.4159/DLCL.aristotle-movement_animals.1937.
- Farquharson, A. S. L., ed. (1944). The Meditations of the Emperor Marcus Antoninus. Vol. 1: Text and Translation. Oxford University Press. doi:10.1093/actrade/9780198814276.book.1. ISBN 978-0198814276.
- Farquharson, A. S. L., ed. (1944). The Meditations of the Emperor Marcus Antoninus. Vol. 2: Greek Commentary. Vol. 2. Oxford University Press. doi:10.1093/actrade/9780198814283.book.1. ISBN 978-0198814283.
