= Paul Vinogradoff =

Russian historian (1854–1925)

Sir Paul Vinogradoff FBA
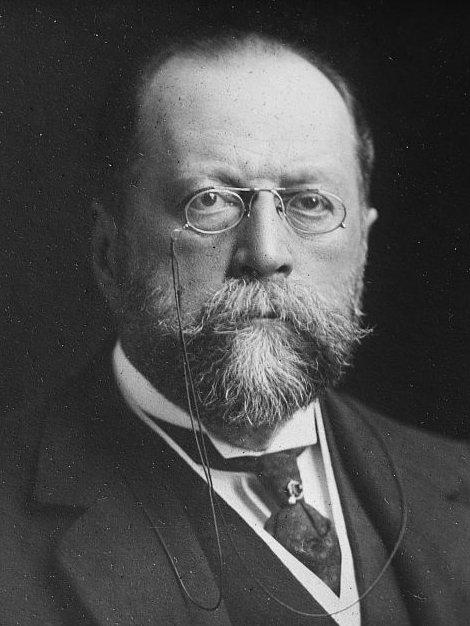
- Born: 30 November [O.S. 18 November] 1854; Kostroma, Russian Empire
- Died: 19 December 1925 (aged 71); Paris, France
- Resting place: Holywell Cemetery, England
- Citizenship: Russian (to 1918); British (from 1918)
- Title: Corpus Professor of Jurisprudence at Oxford University
- Predecessor: Frederick Pollock
- Successor: Walter Ashburner
- Spouse: Louise Stang (m. 1897, died)
- Children: a step-daughter and a daughter and a son
- Honors: Доктор наук (Moscow, 1887); D.C.L. (Oxford, Durham); LLD. (Cambridge, Harvard, Liverpool, Calcutta, Michigan); Dr. juris (Berlin); Doctor honoris causa (Paris)

Academic background
- Education: Imperial Moscow University

Academic work
- Discipline: History of Medieval Europe
- Notable works: Villainage in England: Essays in English Medieval History

Sir Paul Gavrilovitch Vinogradoff FBA (Russian: Павел Гаврилович Виноградов, romanized: Pavel Gavrilovich Vinogradov; 30 November [O.S. 18 November] 1854 – 19 December 1925) was a Russian-British historian and medievalist. He was a leading thinker in the development of historical jurisprudence and legal history as disciplines.

== Life and career ==
=== Early years and education ===
Vinogradoff was born in Kostroma and was educated at the local gymnasium and Moscow University, where he studied history under Vasily Klyuchevsky. After graduating in 1875, he obtained a scholarship to continue his studies in Berlin, where he studied under Theodor Mommsen and Heinrich Brunner.

=== Career ===
Vinogradoff became professor of history at the University of Moscow, but his zeal for the spread of education brought him into conflict with the authorities, and consequently he was obliged to leave Russia. Having settled in England, Vinogradoff brought a powerful and original mind to bear upon the social and economic conditions of early England, a subject which he had already begun to study in Moscow.

Vinogradoff visited Britain for the first time in 1883, working on records in the Public Records Office and meeting leading English scholars such as Sir Henry Maine and Sir Frederick Pollock. He also met Frederic William Maitland, who was heavily influenced by their meeting.

Vinogradoff was elected a member of the American Antiquarian Society in 1897.

In 1903, he was elected to the position of Corpus Professor of Jurisprudence at the University of Oxford, and held this position until he died in 1925. He was elected a Fellow of the British Academy in 1905. He received honorary degrees from the principal universities (including D.C.L. from the University of Oxford in October 1902, in connection with the tercentenary of the Bodleian Library.), was made a member of several foreign academies and was appointed honorary professor of history at Moscow.

Upon the death of Maitland, Vinogradoff became the literary director of the Selden Society with Sir Frederick Pollock, a position he held until 1920. During World War I he gave valuable assistance to the British Foreign Office in connection with Russian affairs. Vinogradoff was knighted in 1917, and he and his children were naturalized as British subjects in 1918.

In 1925, Vinogradoff traveled to Paris to receive an honorary degree from the Sorbonne; while in Paris, he developed pneumonia and died in a hospital there on 19 December. Аfter a funeral service at the Russian Church in Paris, his body was cremated, his ashes were transferred, and on 24 December 1925 he was buried in the Holywell Cemetery, Oxford. The epitaph on his tombstone was chosen by himself: Hospitae Britanniae gratus advena.

== Writing ==
According to the Encyclopædia Britannica, Eleventh Edition, published in 1911, Vinogradoff's Villainage in England (1892) was "perhaps the most important book written on the peasantry of the feudal age and the village community in England; it can only be compared for value with FW Maitland's Domesday Book and Beyond. In masterly fashion Vinogradoff here shows that the villein of Norman times was the direct descendant of the Anglo-Saxon freeman, and that the typical Anglo-Saxon settlement was a free community, not a manor, the position of the freeman having steadily deteriorated in the centuries just around the Norman Conquest. The status of the villein and the conditions of the manor in the 12th and 13th centuries are set forth with a legal precision and a wealth of detail which shows its author, not only as a very capable historian, but also as a brilliant and learned jurist."

The article considered that almost equally valuable was Vinogradoff's essay on “Folkland” in vol. viii. of the English Historical Review (1893), which proved for the first time the real nature of this kind of land. Vinogradoff followed up his Villainage in England with The Growth of the Manor (1905) and English Society in the Eleventh Century (1908), works on the lines of his earlier book.

In Outlines in Historical Jurisprudence (1920–22), Vinogradoff traces the development of basic themes of jurisprudence, including marriage, property, and succession, in six different types of society: the totemistic, the tribal, the ancient city state, the medieval system of feudalism and canon law, and modern industrial society.

== Works ==
=== Books ===
- Происхождение феодальных отношений в Лангобардской Италии [The Origins of Feudal Relations in Lombard Italy] (in Russian). Санкт Петербург: Типография В. С. Балашева. 1880.
- Исследования по социальной истории Англии в средние века (in Russian). Санкт Петербург: Типография В. С. Балашева. 1887.
- Villainage in England: Essays in English Mediaeval History. Oxford: Clarendon Press. 1892.
- Виноградов, Павел (1893). Учебник Всеобщей истории. Vol. 1 Древний мир. Москва: Johan Deubner.
- Виноградов, Павел (1894). Учебник Всеобщей истории. Vol. 2 Средние века. Москва: Johan Deubner.
- Виноградов, Павел (1896). Учебник Всеобщей истории. Vol. 3 Новое время. Москва: Johan Deubner.
- The Teaching of Sir Henry Maine: An Inaugural Lecture Delivered in Corpus Christi College Hall on March 1, 1904. London: Henry Frowde. 1904 – via Internet Archive.
- Виноградов, П. В. (1904). "Учение сэра Генри Мэна". Научное Слово (in Russian) (8). Translated by Орлова, Е. Н.: 59-75 – via Wikimedia Commons.
- Vinogradow, Paul (1904). "L'Enseignement de Sir Henry Maine". Revue internationale de sociologie (in French). 12 (11). Translated by Weil, Fernard: 797-813 – via Gallica.
- "Sur quelques aspects de l'évolution historique du colonat". Atti del Congresso Internazionale di scienze storiche (Roma, 1-9 aprile 1903). Vol. IX (atti della sezione V: storia del diritto, storia delle scienze economiche e sociali). Roma: Tipografia del R. Accademia dei Lincei. 1904. pp. 393-401 – via Internet Archive.
- The Growth of the Manor (2nd ed.). George Allen & Company. 1911.
- История правоведения. (Курс для историков и юристов) Лекцій, читанныя въ ИМПЕРАТОРСКОМЪ Московскомъ Университетѣ въ осеннемъ семестрѣ 1908/9 года (PDF). Москва: Изданіе студентовъ А. Ф. Изюмова и Н. П. Невзорова. 1908 – via Wikimedia Commons.
- English Society in the Eleventh Century. Oxford: Clarendon Press. 1908.
- Roman Law in Medieval Europe. London and New York: Harper & Brothers. 1909.
- "Presidential Address". Essays in Legal History Read Before the International Congress of Historical Studies, held in London in 1913. Oxford University Press. 1913. pp. 3-12 – via Internet Archive.
- Common-sense in Law. London and New York: Williams and Norgate; Henry Holt and Company. 1914.; 2nd ed. H. G. Hanbury, 1946
- Виноградов П. Г. (1915). Очерки по теории права (in Russian). Москва: Товарищeство А. А. Левинсона.
- Self-government in Russia. London: Constable and Company, Limited. 1915 – via Internet Archive.
- Outlines in Historical Jurisprudence (Introduction and Tribal Law). Oxford University Press. 1920.
- Outlines in Historical Jurisprudence (The Jurisprudence of the Greek City). Oxford University Press. 1922.
- Custom and Right. Oslo: H. Aschehoug & Co. (W. Nygaard). 1925 – via Internet Archive.
- The Collected Papers of Paul Vinogradoff, 2 Vol., Oxford: The Clarendon Press, 1928. VOL. 2 (Jurisprudence)

=== Other ===
- Kirkpatrick, F. A., ed. (1902). "The Reforming Work of Tzar Alexander II". Lectures on the History of the Nineteenth Century. Cambridge University Press. pp. 237-256 – via Internet Archive.
- Kirkpatrick, F. A., ed. (1902). "The Meaning of the Present Development in Russia". Lectures on the History of the Nineteenth Century. Cambridge University Press. pp. 257-276.
- Gwatkin, H. M., ed. (1911). "Social and Economic Conditions of the Roman Empire in the Fourth Century". The Cambridge Medieval History. Vol. I. The MacMillan Company. pp. 543-567 – via Internet Archive.
- Gwatkin, H. H., ed. (1913). "Foundations of Society (Origins of Feudalism)". The Cambridge Medieval History. Vol. II. The MacMillan Company. pp. 630 -654.
- Bingham, Alfred, ed. (1914). "Russian Culture". Handbook of the European War. Vol. II. H. W. Wilson Company. pp. 160-165.
- "Russia: The Psychology of a Nation". Oxford Pamphlets. Oxford University Press. 1914.
- The Russian Problem. New York: George H. Doran Co. 1914.
- Stephens, Winifred, ed. (1916). "The Task of Russia". The Soul of Russia. Macmillan & Co. pp. 249-260.
- Malden, Henry Elliot, ed. (1917). "Magna Carta, C. 39. Nullus Liber Homo, etc.". Magna Carta Commemoration Essays. Royal Historical Society. pp. 78-95.
- "Western and Eastern Ideals in Russia". Fortnightly Review. New Series (DCXXIX): 670-677. 1 May 1919 – via Internet Archive.
- "The Situation in Russia". The Reconstruction of Russia. Oxford University Press. 1919. pp. 7-25.
- Hübner, Rudolf, ed. (1918), "Introduction", A History of Germanic Private Law, Little, Brown & Company, pp. xxvii - xli
- Marvin, F. S., ed. (1921), "The Work of Rome", The Evolution of Peace, Oxford University Press, pp. 25 - 42
- "DENIKIN, ANTON (1872 - )". Encyclopaedia Britannica. Vol. XXX (ABBE TO ENGLISH HISTORY) (12th ed.). London and New York: The Encyclopaedia Britannica Ltd. 1922. pp. 825–827 – via Internet Archive.
- "LENIN (originally Oulianov), VLADIMIR ILICH (1870 – )". Encyclopaedia Britannica. Vol. XXXI (ENGLISH LITERATURE TO OYAMA, IWAO) (12th ed.). London and New York: The Encyclopaedia Britannica Ltd. 1922. pp. 756–757 – via Internet Archive.
- "NICHOLAS II (1868-1918)". Encyclopaedia Britannica. Vol. XXXI (ENGLISH LITERATURE TO OYAMA, IWAO) (12th ed.). London and New York: The Encyclopaedia Britannica Ltd. 1922. pp. 1131–1132 – via Internet Archive.
- "MILYUKOV, PAUL NIKOLAYEVICH (1859 – )". Encyclopaedia Britannica. Vol. XXXI (ENGLISH LITERATURE TO OYAMA, IWAO) (12th ed.). London and New York: The Encyclopaedia Britannica Ltd. 1922. p. 947 – via Internet Archive.
- "RUSSIA". Encyclopaedia Britannica. Vol. XXXII (PACIFIC OCEAN ISLANDS TO ZULOAGA) (12th ed.). London and New York: The Encyclopaedia Britannica Ltd. 1922. p. 309-340 – via Internet Archive.

=== As editor ===
- Дайси, А. В. (1891). Основы государственного права Англии. Введение к изучению английской конституции [Basics of English state law. An introduction to the studies of English constitution]. Translated by Полторацкая, О. В. Москва: Л. Ф. Пантелеев.; via DIGITAL COLLECTIONS OF SCIENTIFIC LIBRARY
- Книга для чтения по истории Средних веков. Vol. 1–3. Москва: Просвещение. 1896–1899.
- Tоквиль, Алексис (1896). Старый порядок и революция (L'Ancien régime et la Révolution). Москва: Тип. А.Г. Кольчугина – via Google Books.
- Essays in Legal History Read Before the International Congress of Historical Studies, held in London in 1913. Oxford University Press. 1913 – via Internet Archive.
- Oxford Studies in Social and Legal History. Vol. 1. Oxford: Clarendon Press, 1909. 1909 – via Internet Archive. vol. 4
- The Reconstruction of Russia. London, Edinburgh, Glasgow, Toronto, New York: Oxford University Press. 1919 – via Internet Archive.

=== As translator ===
- Гизо, Ф. (1877). Истории цивилизации во Франции. Vol. 1. Translated by Виноградов, П. Г. Москва: К. Т. Солдатёнкова.

=== Articles ===
- Vinogradoff, Paul (1876). "Die Freilassung zur voller Unabhängigseit in den deutschen Volksrechten". Forschungen zur Deutschen Geschichte. 16: 599-608 – via Internet Archive.
- Vinogradoff, Paul (19 July 1884). "A Note-Book of Bracton". Athenaeum (2960): 81-82. hdl:2027/uc1.c3470752 – via HathiTrust.
- Vinogradoff, Paul (1 June 1885). "Oxford and Cambridge through Foreign Spectacles". The Fortnightly Review. 37 (CCXXII): 862-868 – via Internet Archive.
- Vinogradoff, Paul (April 1885). Pollock, Frederick (ed.). "The text of Bracton". The Law Quarterly Review. I (II): 189-200 – via Google Books.
- Vinogradoff, Paul (October 1886). "Molmen and Molland". The English Historical Review. 1 (4): 734–737. JSTOR 546726.
- Vinogradoff, Paul (October 1888). Pollock, Frederick (ed.). "Bracton's Notebook". The Law Quarterly Review. IV (XVI): 436-441 – via Google Books.
- Виноградов, Павел (November 1890). "Американская демократия (American Commonwealth by J. Bryce 3 vol., London, 1888 - Американская республика Джемса Брайса, пер. В. Н. Неведомского, Москва, 1889-1890 г., 3 тома)" (PDF). Русская Мысль: 62–82 – via wikisource.
- Виноградов, Павел (December 1890). "Американская демократия (American Commonwealth by J. Bryce 3 vol., London, 1888 - Американская республика Джемса Брайса, пер. В. Н. Неведомского, Москва, 1889-1890 г., 3 тома)" (PDF). Русская Мысль: 53–79 – via wikisource.
- Vinogradoff, Paul (January 1893). "Folkland". The English Historical Review. 8 (29): 1–17. JSTOR 548312.
- Vinogradoff, Paul (1905). Pollock, Frederick (ed.). "The Customs of Ragusa". The Law Quarterly Review. XXI. London: Stevens & Sons: 179-183.
- Vinogradoff, Paul (1905). "Magna Carta". The Law Quarterly Review. XXI: 250–257.
- Vinogradoff, Paul (1905). "A Constitutional History of Hungary". The Law Quarterly Review. XXI: 426–431.
- Vinogradoff, Paul (1907). "Frederic William Maitland". English Historical Review. 22 (86): 280–289. doi:10.1093/ehr/XXII.LXXXVI.280. JSTOR 550566.
- Vinogradoff, Paul (May 1907). "Transfer of Land in Old English Law". The Harvard Law Review. 20 (7): 532–548. doi:10.2307/1323497. hdl:2027/hvd.32044053503389. JSTOR 1323497.
- Vinogradoff, Paul (November 1908). "Aristotle on Legal Redress". Columbia Law Review. 8 (7): 548–560. doi:10.2307/1109792. hdl:2027/hvd.32044097718415. JSTOR 1109792.
- Vinogradoff, Paul (1911). "JURISPRUDENCE, COMPARATIVE". Encyclopaedia Britannica. Vol. XV (Italy - Kyshtym). Cambridge: Cambridge University Press. pp. 580-587 – via Internet Archive.
- Vinogradoff, Paul (1914). "LAW, GREEK". In Hastings, James (ed.). Encyclopaedia of Religion and Ethics. Vol. VII (Hymns - Liberty). Edinburgh: T. & T. Clark. pp. 847-850 – via Internet Archive.
- Vinogradoff, Paul (January 1920). "The Crisis of Modern Jurisprudence". The Yale Law Journal. 29 (3): 312–320. doi:10.2307/787166. JSTOR 787166.
- Vinogradoff, Paul (October 1922). "L. Mitteis (1859-1921)". The Journal of Egyptian Archaeology. 8 (3/4): 258–259. doi:10.1177/030751332200800136. JSTOR 3853708.
- Vinogradoff, Paul (December 1922). "The Meaning of Legal History". Columbia Law Review. 22 (8): 693–705. doi:10.2307/1112733. JSTOR 1112733.
- Vinogradoff, Paul (January 1924). "Aims and Methods of Jurisprudence". Columbia Law Review. 24 (1): 1–7. doi:10.2307/1111770. JSTOR 1111770.
- Vinogradoff, Paul (June 1924). "Juridical Persons". Columbia Law Review. 24 (6): 594–604. doi:10.2307/1113204. JSTOR 1113204.
- Vinogradoff, Paul (June 1924). "Some Problems of Public Law: I". California Law Review. 12 (5): 348–355. doi:10.2307/3475874. JSTOR 3475874.
- Vinogradoff, Paul (September 1924). "Some Problems of Public Law: II". California Law Review. 12 (6): 443–453. doi:10.2307/3475796. JSTOR 3475796.
- Shorey, Paul; Vinogradoff, Paul (July 1924). "Universal Justice in Aristotle's Ethics". Classical Philology. 19 (3): 279–281. doi:10.1086/360593. JSTOR 263213.
- Vinogradoff, Paul (November 1924). "The Foundations of a Theory of Rights". Yale Law Journal. 34 (1): 60–69. doi:10.2307/788498. JSTOR 788498.
- Vinogradoff, Paul (November 1924). "Legal Standards and Ideals". Michigan Law Review. 23 (1): 1–8. doi:10.2307/1278949. JSTOR 1278949.
- Vinogradoff, Paul (December 1924). "The Juridical Nature of the State". Michigan Law Review. 23 (2): 138–153. doi:10.2307/1280233. JSTOR 1280233.
