= Greek Tragedy (disambiguation) =

A Greek Tragedy is a form of theatre from Ancient Greece and Anatolia.

Greek Tragedy may also refer to:

- Greek Tragedy (novel), a 1939 detective novel by G.D.H. Cole and Margaret Cole
- Greek Tragedy (play), by Mike Leigh, 1989
- "Greek Tragedy" (song), a 2015 song by the Wombats
