= An Eton Poetry Book =

An Eton Poetry Book is an anthology edited by Cyril Alington and George Lyttelton, with an introduction by A. C. Benson. The editors' intentions were "to provide poems which boys might reasonably be expected to like" and "to awaken their metrical sense." The book was published in 1925, with a second impression in 1927 and a third in 1938.

== Background ==
Alington was Head Master of Eton from 1917 to 1933. Lyttelton was an Eton master from 1908 to 1945. Both men were classicists, but both had a deep love of English literature, which they sought to pass on to their pupils.

In choosing the poems for their anthology, Alington and Lyttelton adopted the following principles:

- to exclude poetry likely to be beyond the grasp of boys;
- to exclude poetry which might appeal to the young but would be repugnant to them in later life;
- to exclude blank verse ("partly because blank verse is appreciably harder to learn by heart, and partly from a desire to keep the book within reasonable limits"); and
- to include favoured excerpts from long works.

The book was first published by Macmillan in London in 1925, with a second impression in 1927 and a third in 1938.

== Poems selected ==
Following their declared wish to awaken boys' metrical sense, the editors grouped their selections into seven sections, the heroic couplet, the octosyllabic couplet, the sonnet, the trochaic metre, the dactylic or anapaestic metre, classical metres, and miscellaneous. The sections, and the poems within them, are introduced with brief background notes, putting them in context.

The heroic couplet

This section begins with excerpts from Chaucer's The Canterbury Tales and continues with works or parts of works from the sixteenth to the twentieth centuries, ending with two anonymous parodies, possibly written by one or both of the editors. In addition to works by the famous names of English poetry, there are verses by lesser-known writers such as Thomas Tickell, and by an American, Oliver Wendell Holmes Sr.

The octosyllabic couplet

For the second section, the editors chose to begin with less well-known verses by Chaucer than The Canterbury Tales: The Hous of Fame and The Book of the Duchesse. They include a short example of euphemism by John Lyly, and continue with a mixture of famous and less famous writers, the latter including Thomas Carew, Richard Crashaw and Charles Churchill. The final poem in this section is "Leisure", by W. H. Davies: "What is this life if, full of care, We have no time to stand and stare."

The sonnet

The celebrated writers of English sonnets are included: Philip Sidney, Michael Drayton, William Shakespeare and John Milton, with later offerings by William Wordsworth, Percy Bysshe Shelley and John Keats. The editors also include works by poets less known for writing sonnets, including George Meredith, William Morris and Rupert Brooke. The section ends with Brooke's "The Soldier": "If I should die, think only this of me, That there's some corner of a foreign field That is for ever England".

The trochaic metre

The editors introduce this section by admitting that "the trochaic metre has not by itself played an important part in our literature ... Tennyson wrote 'Locksley Hall' in trochaics because Mr Hallam told him that the English people liked the metre, but it is very doubtful if he was right." There are fewer poems in this section by the best-known names in English poetry, but Alington and Lyttelton include William Blake's "The Tiger" and Rudyard Kipling's "A Smuggler's Song": "Five and twenty ponies, Trotting through the dark".

The dactylic or anapaestic metre

Though agreeing that the metre is "almost indispensable for comic purposes", the editors also selected serious examples, by among others Matthew Prior, Isaac Watts and Robert Browning – "The Lost Leader": "Just for a handful of silver he left us, Just for a riband to stick in his coat". Nonetheless the poet most represented in this section is Edward Lear, with "The Owl and the Pussy-Cat", "The Quangle Wangle's Hat" and "How Pleasant to Know Mr Lear".

Classical metres

In their introduction to this section, the editors acknowledge that English hexameters and pentameters are, by the nature of modern ideas of scansion, not strictly comparable with classical examples. They extend this caveat to other modern languages: "Goethe's pentameter 'Habe ich Rose-strumpf gehasst and Violet-strumpf dazu' is probably the worst ever written in any language." The English specimens they print include works by Tennyson, Arthur Hugh Clough and Charles Kingsley.

Miscellaneous

The editors admitted, "Our classification of metres is confessedly of the roughest, and the large section headed 'Miscellaneous' is in itself a confession of our humility if not of our ignorance". Once again they begin their choice with Chaucer, who is followed by a large selection of English, Scottish, Irish and American verse in a wide variety of metres and shapes. In this section, Alington and Lyttelton included poets as diverse as Edmund Spenser, the two Sir Walter Raleighs, Ben Jonson, Robert Herrick and twentieth-century poets including John Masefield and W. B. Yeats, alongside writers of comic verse such as A. D. Godley and W. S. Gilbert, who is represented by three lyrics from the Savoy Operas. This is the largest section of the anthology, and it was praised by the reviewer of The Manchester Guardian as the most likely to fulfil the editors' wish to attract young people's interest.

== Reception ==
Reviewing the book in 1925, The Manchester Guardian wrote, "The book is indeed a treasury of great and beautiful things, and there are very many that the ordinary boy can hardly help liking. But ... the appeal of the Restoration and Augustan satires, of the Elizabethan sonnets, and of Myers's 'St Paul' is hardly to the ordinary boy. Indeed, it is the compilers' own conviction that 'many boys are definitely hindered from appreciating poetry by being introduced too soon to poems the beauty of which is beyond their grasp.' What then of Drayton's great sonnet, or Meredith's 'Lucifer in Starlight', or Donne's 'An Anatomy of the World', or Keats's 'Ode to a Nightingale', or Browning's 'My Last Duchess', to mention no more?".

In 1959, the publisher Rupert Hart-Davis wrote of the book, "There can never have been a better anthology for stirring boys' enthusiasm". Lyttelton replied, "It is, I think, out of print now, and never had very much of a sale. Macmillan's didn't do much about it and I always maintained that its title was against it, but Cyril Alington insisted on it. It is true the relevance of it is not very clear. My copy always opens at 'Little Orphant Annie' which I tried to eliminate, but Cyril was mysteriously keen on it. One or two reviews rightly derided it, but mostly such reviews as the book got were quite cordial. One infuriated me. I did practically all of the stuff about the poems and poets, and some ass regretted that readers should be 'told what to think about them'. As no doubt you (and everyone else with eyes) saw, the main gist was to record what had been thought or said about them, very often inviting readers to differ".
