= Arthur Lehman Goodhart =

American lawyer (1891–1978)

Arthur Lehman Goodhart KBE QC FBA
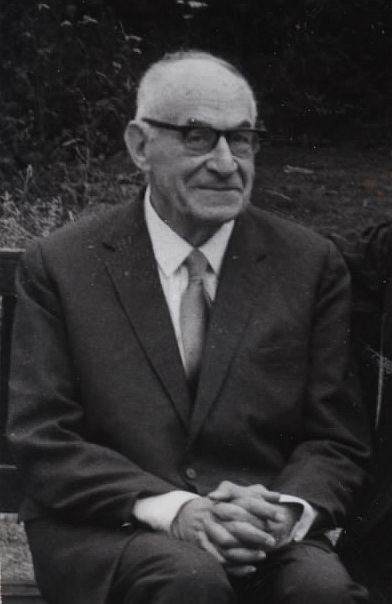
- Arthur Goodhart in the Master's Garden at University College, Oxford
- Born: 1 March 1891; New York City, New York, U.S.
- Died: 10 November 1978 (aged 87); Oxford, England
- Education: Yale University; Trinity College, Cambridge
- Occupations: Jurist and lawyer
- Known for: Professor of Jurisprudence at the University of Oxford
- Spouse: Cecily Carter
- Children: Philip Goodhart; William Goodhart; Charles Goodhart
- Parent(s): Hattie Lehman Goodhart; Philip Goodhart
- Relatives: Lehman family Irving Lehman (uncle)
- Family: Mayer Lehman (grandfather)

Arthur Lehman Goodhart KBE QC FBA (1 March 1891 – 10 November 1978) was an American-born academic jurist and lawyer; he was Professor of Jurisprudence at the University of Oxford, 1931–51, when he was also a Fellow of University College, Oxford. He was the first American to be the Master of an Oxford college, and was a significant benefactor to the college.

== Early life and education ==
Arthur Goodhart was born to a Jewish family in New York City, the youngest of three children born to Harriet "Hattie" (née Lehman) and Philip Julius Goodhart. His siblings were Howard Lehman Goodhart and Helen Goodhart Altschul (married to Frank Altschul). His maternal grandfather was Mayer Lehman, one of three brothers who co-founded the investment banking firm Lehman Brothers. Goodhart was educated at the Hotchkiss School, Yale University and Trinity College, Cambridge. At Yale, he was an editor of campus humor magazine The Yale Record. After returning to the United States, he practised law until World War I. Following the war, he started to pursue an academic career in law, initially at Cambridge University and later at Oxford University where he became Professor of Jurisprudence and subsequently the Master of University College. He was editor of the Law Quarterly Review for fifty years.

== Career ==
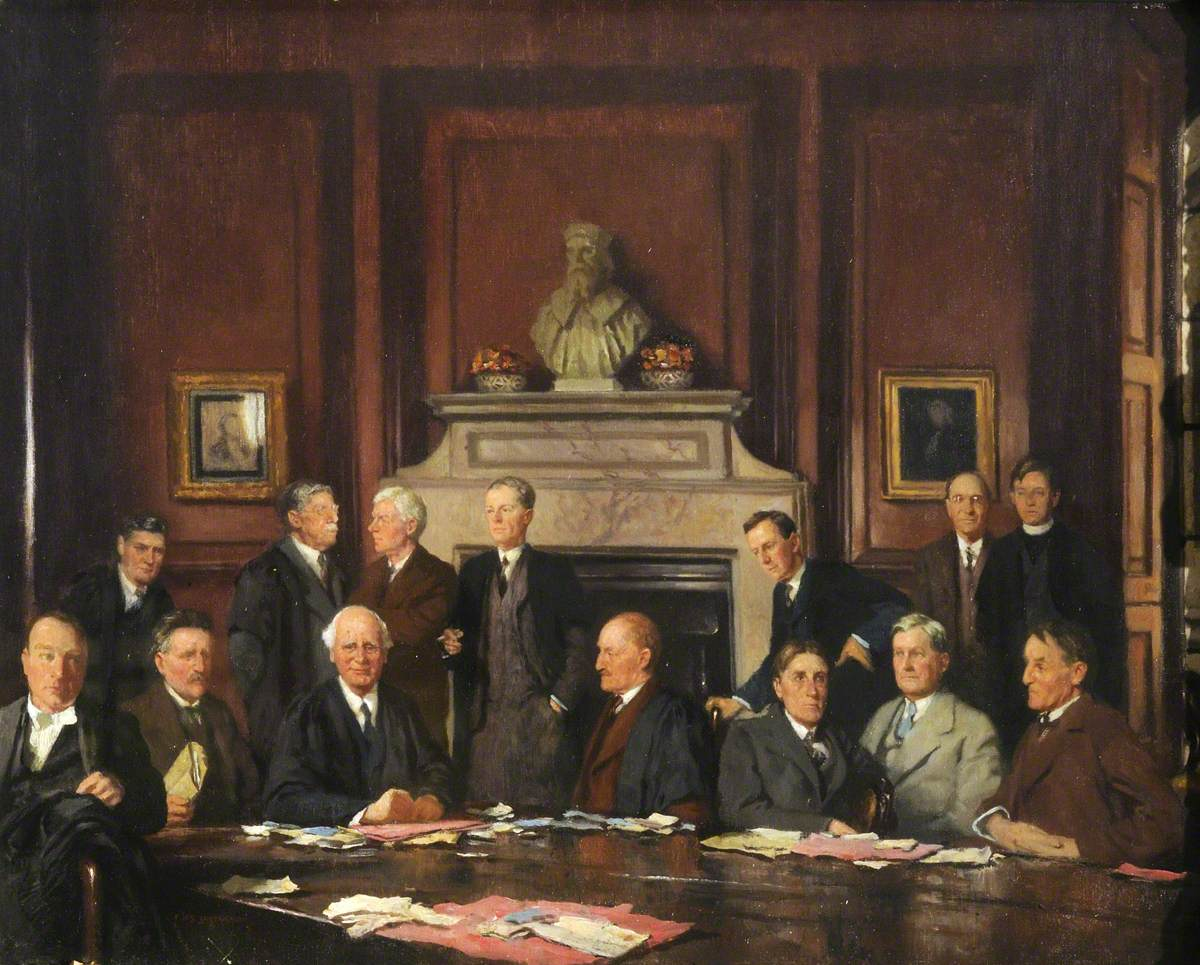
F. H. S. Shepherd, "University College Fellows", 1934: grouped under the college's bust of King Alfred are D. L. Keir, E. W. Ainley-Walker, A. D. Gardner, G. D. H. Cole, J. P. R. Maud, A. L. Goodhart, J. H. S. Wild, E. J. Bowen, A. B. Poynton, Sir Michael Sadler, A. S. L. Farquharson (in the centre), E. F. Carritt, G. H. Stevenson and K. K. M. Leys.

Rejected for service with British forces in World War I, in 1914, Goodhart became a member of the U.S. forces when the U.S. joined the war in 1917; he became counsel to the U.S. mission to Poland, in 1919.

Goodhart was called to the bar by the Inner Temple 1919, and became a fellow of Corpus Christi College, Cambridge, and university lecturer in jurisprudence; he edited the Cambridge Law Journal, 1921–5, and the Law Quarterly Review, 1926. In 1931 he moved to Oxford to become professor of jurisprudence. During WWII, he helped Giles Alington as coordinator of the wartime Short Leave Courses at Balliol College, Oxford. He gave up that chair when he became Master of University College, Oxford, 1951–63. Subsequently, he was an Honorary Fellow of the college until his death in 1978. In 1952 he delivered the Hamlyn Lectures.

As a member of the Law Revision Committee, Goodhart helped to promote improvements in various branches of the law.

=== JFK assassination ===
Goodhart contributed a learned article in 1967 in which he defended the Warren Commission and felt Mark Lane indulged in dangerous and fantastic conspiracy theories.

== Personal life ==
Arthur Goodhart was married to Cecily Goodhart (née Carter), a devout Anglican. They had three children: Sir Philip Goodhart; William Goodhart, Lord Goodhart of Youlbury; and Charles Goodhart (after whom Goodhart's law is named).

== Legacy ==
Students during Goodhart's Mastership of University College included Bob Hawke, matriculated 1953, who was later Prime Minister of Australia.

The Goodhart Quad and the Goodhart Building (to the east, overlooking the quad and used for student accommodation) at University College, Oxford, off Logic Lane, are named in his memory. The largest lecture theatre in the Sir David Williams Building, which houses the Faculty of Law at the University of Cambridge, is also named "The Arthur Goodhart Lecture Theatre" after him. Cecily's Court, a small open area containing a fountain, located between the Goodhart Building and 83–85 High Street, is named in memory of Goodhart's wife.

== Honours and titles ==
- 1938 Honorary bencher, Lincoln's Inn
- 1943, King's Counsel
- 1948, Honorary Knight Commander of the Order of the British Empire (KBE). As a US citizen, an honorary knighthood, and name not prefixed "Sir"
- 1952, Fellow of the British Academy
- He received honorary degrees from twenty universities
- Honorary Fellow, Trinity College, Cambridge
- Honorary Fellow, University College, Oxford

== Selected publications ==
- English Contributions to the Philosophy of Law. New York: Oxford University Press Limited. 1949 – via Internet Archive.
- English Law and the Moral Law. London: Stevens & Sons Limited. 1953 – via Internet Archive.

== Sources ==
- Concise Dictionary of National Biography.
- Who was Who.
- Flade, Roland (1999). The Lehmans: From Rimpar to the New World: A Family History (2nd enlarged ed.). Würzburg: Königshausen und Neumann. ISBN 3-8260-1844-3.

Academic offices
Preceded by John Wild	Master of University College, Oxford; 1951–1963	Succeeded by John Redcliffe-Maud
