= Death in the Quarry =

1934 novel

- Author: G. D. H. Cole and Margaret Cole
- Language: English
- Series: Superintendent Wilson
- Genre: Detective
- Publisher: Collins Crime Club Doubleday (US)
- Publication date: 1934
- Publication place: United Kingdom
- Media type: Print
- Preceded by: End of an Ancient Mariner
- Followed by: Big Business Murder

Death in the Quarry is a 1934 detective novel by the British authors G. D. H. Cole and Margaret Cole. It was the twelfth in their series of novels featuring Superintendent Wilson, one of the many investigators of the Golden Age of Detective Fiction. It was published by the Collins Crime Club.

== Synopsis ==
An explosion at a quarry in rural England that kills the works manager at first appears to be a tragic accident. However once Superintendent Wilson is drawn into the case he is able to solve a case of murder.

== Bibliography ==
- Hubin, Allen J. Crime Fiction, 1749-1980: A Comprehensive Bibliography. Garland Publishing, 1984.
- Magill, Frank Northen. Critical Survey of Mystery and Detective Fiction: Authors, Volume 1. Salem Press, 1988.
- Miskimmin, Esme. 100 British Crime Writers. Springer Nature, 2020.
- Reilly, John M. Twentieth Century Crime & Mystery Writers. Springer, 2015.
