= Murder at the Munition Works =

1940 novel

- First edition
- Author: G. D. H. Cole and Margaret Cole
- Language: English
- Series: Superintendent Wilson
- Genre: Detective
- Publisher: Collins Crime Club Macmillan (US)
- Publication date: 1940
- Publication place: United Kingdom
- Media type: Print
- Preceded by: Greek Tragedy
- Followed by: Counterpoint Murder

Murder at the Munition Works is a 1940 detective novel by the British husband and wife writing team G.D.H. Cole and Margaret Cole. One of the later entries into their series of Golden Age series featuring Superintendent Wilson of Scotland Yard, it was the first to be released following the outbreak of the Second World War. It was published by the Collins Crime Club and released by Macmillan in the United States.

== Synopsis ==
During the Phoney War period, a labour dispute breaks out at a factory producing armaments in a town in southern England. When the managing director's wife is killed in a bomb explosion seemingly intended for her husband. The trade union leader who had led the dispute against the company is in the frame for the murder. The Chief Constable call in the assistance of Wilson to examine the case.

== Critical reception ==
Several reviews noted that the socialist politics of the Coles was particularly displayed in the book. In The New Statesman Ralph Partridge wrote "the scenes of strikes and labour-meetings are well and intimately described, but the Coles' bias to the left will lead the reader straight to the solution."

== Bibliography ==
- Carpenter, L.P. G. D. H. Cole: An Intellectual Biography. CUP Archive, 1973.
- Hubin, Allen J. Crime Fiction, 1749-1980: A Comprehensive Bibliography. Garland Publishing, 1984.
- Magill, Frank Northen. Critical Survey of Mystery and Detective Fiction: Authors, Volume 1. Salem Press, 1988.
- Reilly, John M. Twentieth Century Crime & Mystery Writers. Springer, 2015.
