= Good Christians All, Rejoice and Sing =

1931 Christian hymn by Cyril Alington

"Good Christians All, Rejoice and Sing", originally titled "Good Christian Men, Rejoice", is an English Christian hymn written by Cyril Alington. It was first published in 1931 and is mostly used as an Easter hymn.

== History ==
In 1931, Alington was the headmaster of Eton College and had been writing hymns in English and Latin since his ordination as a Church of England priest in 1901. He wrote "Good Christian Men, Rejoice" to be published in "Songs of Praise", set to the tune of Melchior Vulpius' "Gelobt sei Gott im höchsten Thron". The hymn was later altered and renamed "Good Christian Men, Rejoice and Sing" to avoid confusion with the earlier Christmas carol, "Good Christian Men, Rejoice". The words "Good Christian Men" were later changed to "Good Christians all" as a result of ecumenism which started a trend of altering older hymns to use inclusive language. Alington wrote the hymn with four stanzas, but a fifth verse focusing on the Trinity was added by Norman Mealy in 1982 and appeared in the Episcopal Church's "The Hymnal 1982" in 1986.

=== Critical analysis ===
In 1965, hymnologist Austin C. Lovelace praised "Good Christians All, Rejoice and Sing" as a good example of a contemporary hymn (as it was recent to him at the time of writing and not related to Contemporary Christian music) that used the older 8.8.8 meter (with, additionally, the alleluia refrain). Stanley L. Osbourne also praised the hymn stating that the verses "... vibrate with excitement, they utter the encouragement of victory, and they stir the heart to praise and thanksgiving". The Presbyterian Church in the USA said that the first three verses of the hymn are directed at the congregation as a song of encouragement, while the final verse is focused on the Resurrection of Jesus.
