= Margaret Cole =

English politician and poet (1893–1980)

Dame Margaret Cole DBE
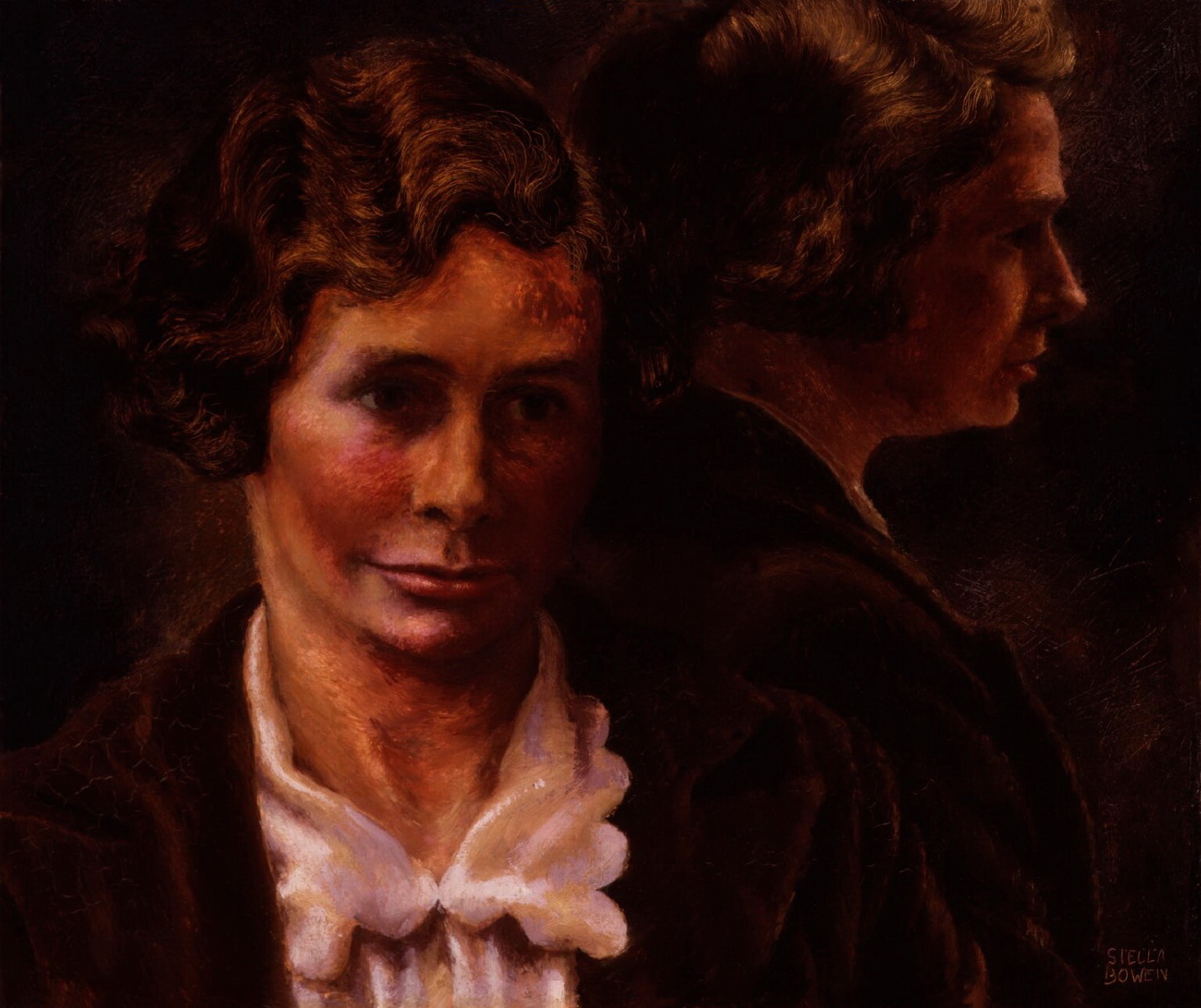
- Portrait by Stella Bowen, 1944–1945
- Born: Margaret Isabel Postgate; 6 May 1893; United Kingdom of Great Britain and Ireland
- Died: 7 May 1980 (aged 87); United Kingdom
- Education: Roedean School; Girton College, Cambridge
- Occupations: Writer, politician
- Spouse: G.D.H. Cole (m. 1918; died 1959)
- Relatives: John Percival Postgate (father); Edith Allen (mother); Raymond Postgate (brother); Oliver Postgate (nephew); John Postgate (nephew); Richard J. Cole (grandson)
- Writing career
- Genres: Mystery, biography

Dame Margaret Isabel Cole DBE (née Postgate; 6 May 1893 – 7 May 1980) was an English socialist politician, writer and poet. She wrote several detective stories jointly with her husband, G. D. H. Cole. She went on to hold important posts in London government after the Second World War.

== Life ==
A daughter of John Percival Postgate and Edith (née Allen) Postgate, Margaret was educated at Roedean School and Girton College, Cambridge. While reading H. G. Wells, George Bernard Shaw and others at Girton, she came to question the Anglicanism of her upbringing and to embrace socialism after reading notable books on the subject.

Having completed her course (Cambridge did not allow women to graduate formally until 1947), Margaret became a classics teacher at St Paul's Girls' School. Her poem The Falling Leaves, a response to the First World War, and currently on the OCR English Literature syllabus at GCSE, shows the influence of Latin poetry in its use of long and short syllables to create mimetic effects.

=== Pacifist period ===
During World War I, her brother Raymond Postgate sought exemption from military service as a socialist conscientious objector, but was denied recognition and jailed for refusing military orders. Her support for her brother led her to a belief in pacifism. During her subsequent campaign against conscription, she met G. D. H. Cole, whom she married in a registry office in August 1918. The couple worked together for the Fabian Society before moving to Oxford in 1924, where they both taught and wrote.

In the early 1930s, Margaret abandoned her pacifism in reaction to the suppression of socialist movements by governments in Germany and Austria and to events in the Spanish Civil War.

=== Education work ===
In 1941, Margaret Cole was co-opted onto the Education Committee of the London County Council, nominated by Herbert Morrison, and became a champion of comprehensive education. She was an alderman on London County Council from 1952 until the council's abolition in 1965. She was a member of the Inner London Education Authority from its creation in 1965 until her retirement from public life in 1967.

In the 1965 New Year Honours, she was appointed an Officer of the Order of the British Empire (OBE) "for political and public services". In the 1970 Queen's Birthday Honours, she was promoted to Dame Commander of the Order of the British Empire (DBE) "for services to local government and education" and thereby granted the title dame.

Brian Harrison recorded an oral history interview with Cole, in July 1975, as part of the Suffrage Interviews project, titled Oral evidence on the suffragette and suffragist movements: the Brian Harrison interviews. Cole talks about her family and upbringing, her involvement in the Labour Party, and of her dislike for Christabel Pankhurst's extreme suffragism.

Dame Margaret Cole died on 7 May 1980, the day after her 87th birthday. Her estate was valued at £137,957.

=== Writings ===
Cole wrote several books, including a biography of her husband. Her brother Raymond was a labour historian, journalist and novelist. She and her husband jointly authored many mystery novels.

Margaret and her husband created a partnership, but not a full marriage: her husband took little interest in sex and regarded women as a distraction from men. Nevertheless, they had a son and two daughters. Margaret Cole comprehensively documented their life together in a biography she wrote of her husband after his death.

The Coles wrote 29 detective novels together, credited as "G.D.H. and M. Cole".

== Detective fiction ==
=== Novels and Short Story Collections ===
G. D. H. Cole

- The Brooklyn Murders (1923). Margaret Cole did not contribute to this novel, which is noted here solely to pre-empt confusion.

G. D. H. and M. Cole

- The Death of a Millionaire (1925)
- The Blatchington Tangle (1926). Serialised, The Daily Herald (1926)
- The Murder at Crome House (1927)
- The Man from the River (1928)
- Superintendent Wilson's Holiday (1928)
- Poison in the Garden Suburb (1929); serialised, The Daily Herald (1929). Also known as Poison in a Garden Suburb
- Burglars in Bucks (1930) aka The Berkshire Mystery
- Corpse in Canonicals (1930) aka The Corpse in the Constable's Garden
- The Great Southern Mystery (1931) aka The Walking Corpse
- Dead Man's Watch (1931)
- Death of a Star (1932)
- A Lesson in Crime (1933)
  - A Lesson in Crime; A Question of Coincidence; Mr. Steven's Insurance Policy; Blackmail in the Village; The Cliff Path Ghost; Sixteen Years Run; Wilson Calling (Wilson); The Brentwardine Mystery; The Mother of the Detective; A Dose of Cyanide; Superintendent Wakley's Mistake.
- The Affair at Aliquid (1933)
- End of an Ancient Mariner (1933)
- Death in the Quarry (1934)
- Big Business Murder (1935)
- Dr Tancred Begins (1935)
- Scandal at School (1935) aka The Sleeping Death
- Last Will and Testament (1936)
- The Brothers Sackville (1936)
- Disgrace to the College (1937)
- The Missing Aunt (1937)
- Mrs Warrender's Profession (1938)
- Off with her Head! (1938)
- Double Blackmail (1939)
- Greek Tragedy (1939)
- Wilson and Some Others (1940)
  - Death in a Tankard (Wilson); Murder in Church (Wilson); The Bone of the Dinosaur (Wilson); A Tale of Two Suitcases (Wilson); The Motive (Wilson); Glass (Wilson); Murder in Broad Daylight (Wilson); Ye Olde Englysshe Christmasse or Detection in the Eighteenth Century; The Letters; The Partner; A Present from the Empire; The Strange Adventures of a Chocolate Box; Strychnine Tonic.
- Murder at the Munition Works (1940)
- Counterpoint Murder (1940)
- Knife in the Dark (1941)
- Toper's End (1942)
- Death of a Bride (1945)
- Birthday Gifts (1946)
- The Toys of Death (1948)

=== Radio plays ===
G. D. H. and M. Cole

- Murder in Broad Daylight. BBC Home Service, 1 June 1934
- The Bone of the Dinosaur. (Detection Club: Series 1, Episode 6). BBC Home Service, 23 and 27 November 1940

== Bibliography ==
- Margaret Cole (1948): Makers of the Labour Movement, London: Longmans.
- Margaret Cole (1949): Growing Up Into Revolution, London: Longmans.
- Margaret Cole (1961): The Story of Fabian Socialism, London: Heinemann.
- Margaret Cole (1971): The Life of G. D. H. Cole, London: Macmillan. ISBN 0333002164
- Naomi Mitchison (1982): Margaret Cole, 1893–1980, (Fabian Tract) ISBN 0-7163-0482-1
- B. D. Vernon (1986): Margaret Cole 1893–1980: A Political Biography, London: Routledge. ISBN 0-7099-2611-1
- See under G. D. H. Cole for joint works.

Party political offices
Preceded by Harold Wilson	Chairman of the Fabian Society; 1955–1956	Succeeded by Arthur Skeffington
Preceded by G. D. H. Cole	President of the Fabian Society; 1962–1980	Succeeded by John Parker
