= Professor of Jurisprudence (Oxford) =

The position of Professor of Jurisprudence (originally the Corpus Professor of Jurisprudence) at the University of Oxford, England, was created in 1869.

The holders of the position have been:

- Sir Henry Maine 1869–77
- Sir Frederick Pollock 1883–1903
- Sir Paul Vinogradoff 1903–25
- Walter Ashburner 1926–1929
- Sir Carleton Allen 1929–1931
- Arthur Lehman Goodhart 1931–51
- H. L. A. Hart 1952–68
- Ronald Dworkin 1969–98
- John Gardner 2000–2016
- Ruth Chang 2019–
