= The Man from the River =

1928 novel

- Author: G. D. H. Cole and Margaret Cole
- Language: English
- Series: Superintendent Wilson
- Genre: Detective
- Publisher: Collins; Macmillan (US)
- Publication date: 1928
- Publication place: United Kingdom
- Media type: Print
- Preceded by: The Blatchington Tangle
- Followed by: Poison in the Garden Suburb

The Man from the River is a 1928 detective novel by the British authors G. D. H. Cole and Margaret Cole. It was the fourth in a series of novels written by the couple during the Golden Age of Detective Fiction featuring Superintendent Wilson of Scotland Yard. It was published by the Collins in London and Macmillan in the United States.

== Synopsis ==
While Wilson is enjoying a few days holiday in rural Essex, a body of a man is discovered in the river. What appears on the surface a case of drowning by accident is soon revealed to be deliberate murder. A variety of suspects may have wanted to kill the man including his business partner, his wife, her lover or a local doctor.

== Bibliography ==
- Hubin, Allen J. Crime Fiction, 1749-1980: A Comprehensive Bibliography. Garland Publishing, 1984.
- Magill, Frank Northen. Critical Survey of Mystery and Detective Fiction: Authors, Volume 1. Salem Press, 1988.
- Reilly, John M. Twentieth Century Crime & Mystery Writers. Springer, 2015.
