= Movement of Animals =

Biological work by Aristotle

Movement of Animals (or On the Motion of Animals; Greek Περὶ ζῴων κινήσεως; Latin De Motu Animalium) is one of Aristotle's major texts on biology. It sets out the general principles of animal locomotion.

== Pneuma ==
All animals "possess an inborn spirit (pneuma sumphuton) and exercise their strength in virtue of it." (703a10). This inborn spirit is used to explain desire (orexis), which is classified as the "central origin (to meson), which moves by being itself moved." (703a5-6). Aristotle furthers this idea of being a "middle cause" by furnishing the metaphor of the movement of the elbow, as it relates to the immobility of the shoulder (703a13). The inborn pneuma is, likewise, tethered to the soul, or as he says here, tēn arche tēn psuchikēn, "the origin of the soul," the soul as the center of causality. This "spirit" is not the soul itself but a limb of the soul that helps it move.

The inborn spirit causes movement in the body by expanding and contracting. Each of these implies not only a movement but also a change in the degree of power and strength of the animal. "when it contracts it is without force, and one and the same cause gives it force and enables it to thrust" (703a23).

Compare this to the view that is developed in On Sleeping and Waking, namely, the view "that has been laid down that sense-perception originates in the same part of an animal's body as movement does. [...] In sanguineous animals this is the region about the heart; for all sanguineous animals possess a heart, and both movement and the dominant sense-perception originate there. As for movement, it is clear that breathing and in general the process of cooling takes its rise here, and that nature has supplied both breathing and the power of cooling by moisture with a view to the conservation of the heat in that part. We will discuss this later on. In bloodless animals and insects and creatures which do not respire, the naturally inherent breath is seen expanding and contraction in the part which corresponds to the heart in other animals" (456a1-13).

"Since it is impossible to make any movement, or do any action without strength, and the holding of the breath produces strength" (456a17).

== Editions and translations ==
- Works related to On the Movement of Animals at Wikisource
- On the Motion of Animals, translated by A. S. L. Farquharson
- Movement & Progression of Animals public domain audiobook at LibriVox
- De Motu and De Incessu Animalium, translated by A. S. L. Farquharson (Internet Archive)
- Martha Nussbaum, Aristotle's De Motu Animalium. Princeton University Press, 1978 ISBN 0691020353.
- Morison, Benjamin; Rapp, Christof; Primavesi, Oliver (2023). Aristotle, "De motu animalium". Oxford: Oxford University press. ISBN 9780198874461.
