= Krishna Kamini Rohatgi-Mukherjee =

Indian photochemist and photophysicist (1924–2009)

- Born: 2 August 1924; Patna, Bihar, British India (now Bihar, India)
- Died: 31 December 2009 (aged 85); Nagpur, Maharashtra, India
- Other names: K. K. Rohatgi-Mukherjee; Krishna Kamini Rohatgi Mukherjee
- Education: University of Calcutta (BSc, MSc); University of Oxford (DPhil)
- Known for: Photochemistry and photophysics of anthracene derivatives and dyes; establishment of the Indian Photobiology Group (later Indian Photobiology Society)
- Awards: C. V. Raman Gold Medal (Indian Science Congress Association, 1990)
- Scientific career
- Fields: Photochemistry; photophysics
- Institutions: Jadavpur University; Indian National Science Academy (INSA)
- Doctoral advisor: E. J. Bowen

Krishna Kamini Rohatgi-Mukherjee (2 August 1924 – 31 December 2009) was an Indian photochemist and photophysicist who was a professor of chemistry at Jadavpur University in Kolkata. She was elected a Fellow of the Indian National Science Academy (INSA) in 1984. Rohatgi-Mukherjee helped establish the Indian Photobiology Group (later the Indian Photobiology Society) in 1964. She served as president of the Association Internationale de Photobiologie (AIP) from 1984 to 1988, and was president of the Tenth International Congress of Photobiology held in Jerusalem in 1988. She authored the textbook Fundamentals of Photochemistry (first published 1978).

== Early life and education ==
Rohatgi-Mukherjee was born on 2 August 1924 in Patna (then in Bihar, British India). Her family later lived in Kolkata, where she attended Gokhale Memorial Girls' School.

She studied chemistry at colleges affiliated with the University of Calcutta, earning a BSc with honours in 1943 and an MSc in 1945 (physical chemistry). During her undergraduate and master's studies, she received multiple awards, including the Basanti Debi Medal and Kunj Behari Basak Medal (1943), and the University Silver Medal and Jogmaya Debi Gold Medal (1945).

In 1950, she joined the University of Oxford, where she completed a DPhil in 1952 under E. J. Bowen on the photochemistry of anthracene derivatives and subsequently remained a senior member of St Anne's College, Oxford.

== Academic and research career ==
Rohatgi-Mukherjee began research in 1948 at the Department of Chemistry of the College of Engineering and Technology, Jadavpur (later Jadavpur University), working on fluorescence and quenching phenomena in anthracene solutions. After returning from Oxford, she held a Sir P. C. Ray Research Fellowship at the University College of Science, University of Calcutta (1954–1956), during which she delivered photochemistry lectures to MSc students. In 1956, she went to the University of California, Berkeley as a Fulbright/Smith–Mundt grantee to work on measuring excited-state lifetimes using phase-shifting techniques.

She joined Jadavpur University in 1958 as a reader in physical chemistry and became a professor of chemistry in 1974. She held visiting and temporary posts including assistant professor at Indian Institute of Technology Kanpur (1963–1964) and visiting scientist at the School of Life Sciences, Jawaharlal Nehru University (1973–1974). She served as head of the Department of Chemistry at Jadavpur University (1979–1982), retired in 1989, and continued at the department as an INSA senior scientist (1990–1993).

== Research ==
Rohatgi-Mukherjee's research addressed photophysical and photochemical processes in organic and inorganic systems, with work spanning fluorescence, excited-state reactions, and spectroscopy. She also investigated dye aggregation and fluorescence quenching in systems relevant to laser dyes, including thermodynamic analysis of dimer formation and exciton-related splitting of absorption bands.

From the late 1970s, she incorporated flash photolysis and related approaches, including work with George Porter at the Royal Institution (1978), and later visiting-scientist appointments abroad, including the University of Notre Dame (1984) and an inter-academy exchange visit to Poland (1986). Her later work included photochemical and photoelectrochemical approaches to solar energy conversion and storage, including model studies using micelles and liposomes.

== Professional service and honours ==
Rohatgi-Mukherjee helped establish the Indian Photobiology Group (later renamed the Indian Photobiology Society) in 1964, and the society became affiliated with the Association Internationale de Photobiologie (AIP) in the same year. She served as UGC National Lecturer in 1980 and as vice-president of the Indian Chemical Society. She was India's national representative to a committee of the International Union of Pure and Applied Chemistry (1982–1983).

Within AIP, she served as president from 1984 to 1988. In 1988, she presided over the Tenth International Congress of Photobiology in Jerusalem and was elected an honorary life member of AIP. She received the C. V. Raman Gold Medal from the Indian Science Congress Association in 1990.

== Personal life ==
She was married to the chemist Sushil Kumar Mukherjee, who served as vice-chancellor of the University of Calcutta and the University of Kalyani.

Rohatgi-Mukherjee died on 31 December 2009 in Nagpur, India.
