= Toper's End =

1942 novel

- American first edition
- Author: G.D.H. Cole and Margaret Cole
- Language: English
- Series: Superintendent Wilson
- Genre: Detective
- Publisher: Collins Crime Club Macmillan (US)
- Publication date: 1942
- Publication place: United Kingdom
- Media type: Print
- Preceded by: Counterpoint Murder

Toper's End is a 1942 detective novel by the British authors G.D.H. Cole and Margaret Cole. It was the final entry in their series of over twenty books dating back to 1923 featuring Superintendent Wilson, a former officer of Scotland Yard turned Private Detective. Part of the Golden Age of Detective Fiction, it takes place against the backdrop of the Second World War. It was published by the Collins Crime Club.

Ralph Partridge wrote in The New Statesman "The caricatures of refugee mentality are still amusing, but the plot is hackneyed and the detection, in spite of a great ox of a clue staring everyone in the face on an early page, is so feeble that Superintendent Wilson actually has to use third degree methods to extort a confession." Maurice Richardson wrote a more appreciative review in The Observer.

== Synopsis ==
Doctor Sambourne, a wealthy scientist, uses Excalibur House his country property at Toper's End to house foreign refugees of various nationalities who have fled to England for safety from Nazi-dominated Europe. The reception from the locals including the Home Guard and Sambourne's own family is less than welcoming, with the foreign guests considered to be enemy spies. When Sambourne's brother-in-law is murdered, suspicion laced with xenophobia sweeps the area and it left up to Wilson to solve the case.

== Bibliography ==
- Hubin, Allen J. Crime Fiction, 1749-1980: A Comprehensive Bibliography. Garland Publishing, 1984.
- Magill, Frank Northen. Critical Survey of Mystery and Detective Fiction: Authors, Volume 1. Salem Press, 1988.
- Reilly, John M. Twentieth Century Crime & Mystery Writers. Springer, 2015.
- Stewart, Victoria. Literature and Justice in Mid-Twentieth-Century Britain: Crimes and War Crimes. Oxford University Press, 2023.
