= Walter Metcalf (chemist) =

New Zealand physical chemist

- Born: Walter Sidney Metcalf; 18 May 1918; Kaitangata, New Zealand
- Died: 25 July 2008 (aged 90); New Zealand
- Education: University of Oxford
- Known for: Photochemistry
- Awards: T. K. Sidey Medal (1966)
- Scientific career
- Fields: Physical chemistry
- Workplaces: Victoria University College; University of Canterbury
- Doctoral advisor: E. J. Bowen

Walter Sidney Metcalf (18 May 1918 – 25 July 2008) was a New Zealand physical chemist.

Metcalf was born in Kaitangata on 18 May 1918, the son of George Metcalf, and was educated at Napier Boys' High School. He earned a bachelor's degree in music in parallel with his first science degree at the University of Otago, and completed a DPhil degree with E. J. Bowen at England's Oxford University.

Metcalf married Mary Glen Simmers, and the couple went on to have two children.

Metcalf initially worked at Victoria University College, then moved to Canterbury University College (now the University of Canterbury) in 1954. He retired as a reader in 1975. He worked mainly on photochemistry and was awarded the T. K. Sidey Medal by the Royal Society of New Zealand for his research in 1966. Towards the end of his career, he worked on calcium metabolism.
