= Henry Alington =

English cricketer and clergyman

Personal information
- Full name: Henry Giles Alington
- Born: 25 July 1837; Candlesby, Lincolnshire, England
- Died: 2 December 1928 (aged 91); Candlesby, Lincolnshire, England
- Batting: Unknown

Domestic team information
- Years: Team
- 1859: Oxford University

Career statistics
Competition	First-class
Matches	2
Runs scored	12
Batting average	3.00
100s/50s	–/–
Top score	11
Catches/stumpings	–/–
- Source: Cricinfo, 27 April 2014

The Reverend Henry Giles Alington (25 July 1837 – 2 December 1928) was an English clergyman and cricketer.

== Life ==
Born at Candlesby, Lincolnshire, to the Reverend John Alington and Charlotte Bellingham, he was educated at Rugby School and Magdalen College, Oxford. His father came from a long line of clerics, a branch of the landed gentry Alington family of Little Barford Manor House, St Neots, Huntingdonshire, and was descended from the Alingtons of Horseheath, an ancient Cambridgeshire family, from which also descended the Barons Alington.

While studying at Oxford, Alington made two appearances in first-class cricket for Oxford University in 1859 against the Marylebone Cricket Club and in The University Match against Cambridge University, scoring 12 runs. He was later an Anglican priest and an Inspector of Schools.

Alington died at the village of his birth on 2 December 1928.

== Family ==
Alington married Jane Margaret Booth (died 1910). Their son Cyril Alington was known as an educationalist, scholar, cleric, and author. His brother Herbert Alington, as well as his brother-in-law Clement Booth, were both first-class cricketers.
