= A History of Socialist Thought =

Book series (five vol., 1953–1960) by G. D. H. Cole

- Volume I from A History of Socialist Thought, The Forerunners, 1789–1850
- Author: G. D. H. Cole
- Subject: History of socialism
- Publisher: Macmillan & Co.
- Publication date: 1953–1960

A History of Socialist Thought is five-volume series by G. D. H. Cole, published by Macmillan & Co. between 1953 and 1960. It has been described as Cole's magnum opus.

== Volumes ==
1. The Forerunners, 1789–1850 (1953)
2. Marxism and Anarchism, 1850–1890 (1954)
3. The Second International, 1889–1914 (1956)
4. Communism and Social Democracy, 1914–1931 (1958)
5. Socialism and Fascism, 1931–1939 (1960)

== Bibliography ==
- Bodin, Louis (1959). "Review of A History or Socialist Thought. 6 tomes in-8°. Vol. I. Socialist thought. The forerunners. Vol. II. Socialist thought. Marxism and anarchism. Vol. III. The Second international. Vol. IV. Communism and social democracy". Revue française de science politique (in French). 9 (2): 489–490. ISSN 0035-2950. JSTOR 43114316.
