= List of fellows of the Royal Society elected in 1935 =

This is a list of people elected Fellow of the Royal Society in 1935.

== Fellows ==
- Neil Kensington Adam
- Edward Neville da Costa Andrade
- Sir Frederick Grant Banting
- Sir Samuel Phillips Bedson
- Edmund John Bowen
- George Edward Briggs
- Herbert Graham Cannon
- John Stuart Foster
- James de Graaff-Hunter
- Sir Wilfrid Edward le Gros Clark
- Arthur Lewis Hall
- William Herbert Hatfield
- Sir Bernard Augustus Keen
- Sir Rudolph Albert Peters
- John Read
- Redcliffe Nathan Salaman
- Robert Stoneley

== Foreign members ==
- Irving Langmuir
- Max Wilhelm Carl Weber

== Statute 12 ==
- Walter Elliot Elliot
