= Cyril Alington =

English educationalist, scholar, cleric, and author (1872–1955)

The Very Reverend Cyril Alington
- Dean of Durham
- Alington in 1908 at the time of his appointment to Shrewsbury School
- Church: Church of England
- Diocese: Diocese of Durham
- In office: 1933 to 1951
- Other posts: Headmaster of Shrewsbury School (1908–1916); Head Master of Eton College (1916–1933)

Orders
- Ordination: 1901

Personal details
- Born: Cyril Argentine Alington; 22 October 1872 Ipswich, Suffolk, England
- Died: 16 May 1955 (aged 82) St Weonards, Herefordshire, England
- Buried: Durham Cathedral
- Denomination: Anglicanism
- Parents: Henry Giles Alington (1837–1928); Jane Margaret Booth (d. 1910)
- Spouse: Hester Margaret Lyttelton (d. 1958)
- Children: 6, including Elizabeth and Giles

Cyril Argentine Alington (22 October 1872 – 16 May 1955) was an English educationalist, scholar, cleric, and author. He was successively the headmaster of Shrewsbury School and Eton College. He also served as chaplain to King George V and as Dean of Durham.

== Early life ==
Dr Alington was the second son of the Rev. Henry Giles Alington, an inspector of schools, and his wife Jane Margaret Booth (d. 1910), daughter of Rev. Thomas Willingham Booth. His father came from a long line of clerics, a branch of the landed gentry Alington family of Little Barford Manor House, St Neots, Huntingdonshire, and was descended from the Alingtons of Horseheath, an ancient Cambridgeshire family, from which also descended the Barons Alington. He was educated at Marlborough College and Trinity College, Oxford. He gained a First in Classical Moderations (Latin and Greek) in 1893 and a First in Literae Humaniores (Philosophy and Ancient History) in 1895. He was elected a Fellow of All Souls College, Oxford in 1896. He was ordained as an Anglican priest in 1901.

== Career ==
Alington's educational career began as a sixth-form master at Marlborough College in 1896. He moved to Eton College in 1899, but left to become headmaster of Shrewsbury School in 1908. In 1917 he returned to Eton to succeed his brother-in-law, Edward Lyttelton, as headmaster; he remained there until his retirement from teaching in 1933. He served as chairman of the Headmasters' Conference, 1924–25. At Eton, a building which houses much of the English department is now named after him, as is Shrewsbury's school hall.

From 1933 to 1951 Alington served as Dean of Durham. He had become a Doctor of Divinity at Oxford in 1917 and received other honours: he was chaplain to the King from 1921 until 1933; he was made an Honorary Fellow of Trinity College, Oxford in 1926, and an honorary DCL at Durham University in 1937. He received the freedom of the City of Durham in 1949.

He appeared on the cover of Time magazine on 29 June 1931. "An accomplished classicist, a witty writer especially of light verse, and a priest of orthodox convictions ..."

== Marriage and family ==
In 1904, Alington married Hester Margaret Lyttelton (CBE; died 1958), the youngest daughter of George Lyttelton, 4th Baron Lyttelton. The couple had four daughters and two sons:

- Kathleen Lucy Alington (1908–1938)
- Elizabeth Hester Alington (1909–1990), married Alec Douglas-Home, 14th Earl of Home), British prime minister
- Lavinia Sybil Alington (1911–1994), married Sir Roger Mynors, academic and classical scholar
- Giles Alington (1914–1956), Dean and Senior Tutor of University College, Oxford
- Joan Argentine Alington (1916–2000), married Rev. John Vaughan Wilkes, Master in College and later housemaster at Eton, Warden of Radley College and later vicar of Marlow
- Patrick Cyril Waynflete Alington (1920–1943), killed at Salerno in World War II

Alington died at the age of 82 and was buried at Durham Cathedral, where there is a memorial in the north transept.

== Literary works ==
Alington wrote more than 50 books, including works on religion, biography, history, poetry, and a series of detective novels. He also wrote several popular hymns, including Good Christian Men, Rejoice and Sing (recently altered to Good Christians All, Rejoice and Sing), Ye that know The Lord is gracious and The Lord of Hosts Our King Shall Be which is used as the epigraph to Nevil Shute's novel In the Wet. (Shute was a pupil at Shrewsbury.)

=== Fiction ===
- Mr Evans – A Cricket-Detective Story (1922)
- Through the Shadows (1922)
- Strained Relations (1922)
- The Count in Kensington (1926)
- King Harrison & Others (1923). King Harrison is a comic opera
- Tommy's Uncle (1927)
- The Abbot's Cup (1930)
- Crime on the Kennet (1939)
- Ten Crowded Hours (1944)
- Archdeacons Afloat (1946)
- Midnight Wireless (1947)
- Archdeacons Ashore (1947)
- Blackmail in Blankshire (1949)
- Gold and Gaiters (1950)
- The Nabob's Jewel (1953)
- Blessed Blunders (1954).

=== Non-fiction works ===
- A Schoolmaster's Apology (1914)
- Shrewsbury Fables (1917)
- Eton Fables (1921)
- Twenty Years: Being a Study of the Party System, 1815–1835 (1921)
- Virgil Aeneid IV-VI (1922 – translation of Virgil)
- Why We Read the Old Testament (1924)
- An Eton Poetry Book (1925 – an anthology co-edited with George Lyttelton)
- More Eton Fables (1927)
- Elementary Christianity (1927)
- Doubts and Difficulties (1929)
- Cautionary Catches (1931 – verses in Latin and English)
- Christian Outlines: An Introduction to Religion (1932)
- Final Eton Fables (1933)
- Eton Faces Old and Young (1933)
- Lionel Ford (1934)
- The Fool Hath Said (1933)
- Can We Believe in God? (1936)
- Things Ancient and Modern (1936 – autobiographical book on English public schools)
- The New Testament: A Reader's Guide (1938)
- The Last Crusade (1940)
- The Kingdom of God (1941)
- Christianity in England: An Historical Sketch (1942)
- Poets at Play (1942)
- In Shabby Streets and Other Verses (1942)
- Edward Lyttelton: An Appreciation (1943)
- Good News (1945);
- Europe: A Personal and Political Survey (1946)
- The Life Everlasting (1947)
- Durham Cathedral: The Story of a Thousand Years (1948)
- Sense and Non-sense (1949)
- A Dean's Apology: A Semi-religious Autobiography (1952)

=== Non-fiction articles ===
- Apostle of Germany. Daily Telegraph, 1937
- Is It Wrong to Pray – for Success, for Wealth, for Victory?. Answers, 1938

=== Poetry ===
- To C. A. L.. (c. 1916); anthologized in The Muse in Arms
- The King: A Psalm of Thanksgiving. (1929). Written for the thanksgiving service for the recovery of King George V for which it was set to music by Henry Walford Davies
- To the School at War. (London) Times, 19 December 1914
- Qui Laborat Orat. (London) Sunday Times, 11 January 1942
- The Trust. The Methodist, 16 June 1945

== Bibliography ==
- Oxford Dictionary of National Biography
- Burke's Landed Gentry, edited by Hugh Montgomery-Massingberd, 18th edition, London, 1972, volume 3, p. 11.

Academic offices
Preceded by Henry Whitehead Moss	Headmaster of Shrewsbury School; 1908–1917	Succeeded by Harold A.P. Sawyer
Preceded by Edward Lyttelton	Head Master of Eton College; 1916–1933	Succeeded by Claude Aurelius Elliott
Church of England titles
Preceded by	Chaplain-in-Ordinary to the Monarch of the United Kingdom; 1921–1933	Succeeded by
Preceded by James Edward Cowell Welldon	Dean of Durham Cathedral; 1933–1951	Succeeded by John Herbert Severn Wild
