= Giles Alington (academic) =

British academic administrator (1914–1956)

Giles Alington (29 May 1914 – 24 February 1956) was a British academic and academic administrator. He was a dean and Fellow of University College, Oxford, from 1944 to 1956.

== Early life ==
Alington was born 29 May 1914. He was the eldest son of the Very Revd Dr Cyril Alington, headmaster of Eton College, Shrewsbury School, and dean at Durham Cathedral, and his wife, Hester Margaret, née Lyttelton. His father came from a long line of clerics, a branch of the landed gentry Alington family of Little Barford Manor House, St Neots, Huntingdonshire, and was descended from the Alingtons of Horseheath, an ancient Cambridgeshire family, from which also descended the Barons Alington.

== Career ==
Before World War II, Alington was assistant secretary of the National Association of Probation Officers. He was unable to join up during World War II due to ill health. Instead, he helped Arthur Goodhart as coordinator of the wartime Short Leave Courses at Balliol College, Oxford.

Alington was a dominant figure amongst the fellows at University College, Oxford in the post-war years. He was appointed Dean of the College in 1945 and also Senior Tutor from 1948 until his death. He was not very academic (achieving a Third in his degree), but was well liked by students for his patrician manner, and he also had administrative ability. While in Oxford, he was also a magistrate and a member of the Visiting Justices' Committee at Oxford Prison.

== Honors ==
The Alington Room at University College is named in his memory.

== Personal life ==
Alington died at the age of 41 on 24 February 1956.
