= Walter Ashburner =

Walter Ashburner (1864 – February 1936) was an American-born British classical and legal scholar. He was Professor of Jurisprudence at the University of Oxford from 1926 to 1929.

== Selected publications ==
- Ashburner, Walter, ed. (1909). ΝΟΜΟΣ ΡΟΔΙΩΝ ΝΑΥΤΙΚΩΣ: THE RHODIAN SEA LAW. Oxford: At the Clarendon Press – via Internet Archive.
