= Walter Raleigh (disambiguation) =

Sir Walter Raleigh (c. 1554 – 1618) was an English writer, poet, soldier, courtier and explorer.

Walter Raleigh or Sir Walter Raleigh may also refer to:

- Walter Raleigh (professor) (1861–1922), English scholar, poet and author
- Walter Raleigh (priest) (1586–1646), Dean of Wells, 1642–1644
- "Sir Walter Raleigh" (essay), an essay by Henry David Thoreau
- Sir Walter Raleigh (play), a 1719 tragedy by George Sewell
- Sir Walter Raleigh Hotel, a hotel in Raleigh, North Carolina
- Sir Walter Raleigh, a GWR 3031 Class locomotive that was built for and run on the Great Western Railway between 1891 and 1915
- TSS Sir Walter Raleigh, a ship

== See also ==
- Sir Walter (born 1890), American race horse
- Wally Raleigh (Timothy Walter Raleigh), Australian rules footballer
