= Greek Tragedy (novel) =

1939 novel

- First edition
- Author: G. D. H. Cole and Margaret Cole
- Language: English
- Series: Superintendent Wilson
- Genre: Detective
- Publisher: Collins Crime Club Macmillan (US)
- Publication date: 1939
- Publication place: United Kingdom
- Media type: Print
- Preceded by: Double Blackmail
- Followed by: Murder at the Munition Works

Greek Tragedy is a 1939 detective novel by the British authors G. D. H. Cole and Margaret Cole. A husband and wife writing team, it was part of their series of novels featuring Superintendent Wilson, one of the many investigators of the Golden Age of Detective Fiction. It was published by the Collins Crime Club. It is set in Greece during the rule of Ioannis Metaxas. Written in peacetime, a year after its publication the Italian invasion of Greece took place, dragging the country into the Second World War.

== Synopsis ==
A British touring party travelling round the islands of the Aegean Sea is shocked on arriving in Delphi to find their tour guide stabbed to death in a grove of olives. Wilson, one of the holidaymakers, takes over the investigation but finds himself hampered by the behaviour of the Greek secret police.

== Critical reception ==
Reviewing the book in The Guardian fellow writer E.R. Punshon wrote "Superintendent Wilson, conveniently at hand on holiday, takes the case in hand and discovers the truth, but the interest of the book lies less with murder and mystery than with the amusing description of the tour and the tourists".

== See also ==
- The Widow's Cruise, a 1959 detective novel by Cecil Day-Lewis which also takes place on a cruise around the Greek islands.

== Bibliography ==
- Hubin, Allen J. Crime Fiction, 1749-1980: A Comprehensive Bibliography. Garland Publishing, 1984.
- Magill, Frank Northen. Critical Survey of Mystery and Detective Fiction: Authors, Volume 1. Salem Press, 1988.
- Reilly, John M. Twentieth Century Crime & Mystery Writers. Springer, 2015.
