= John Wild (priest) =

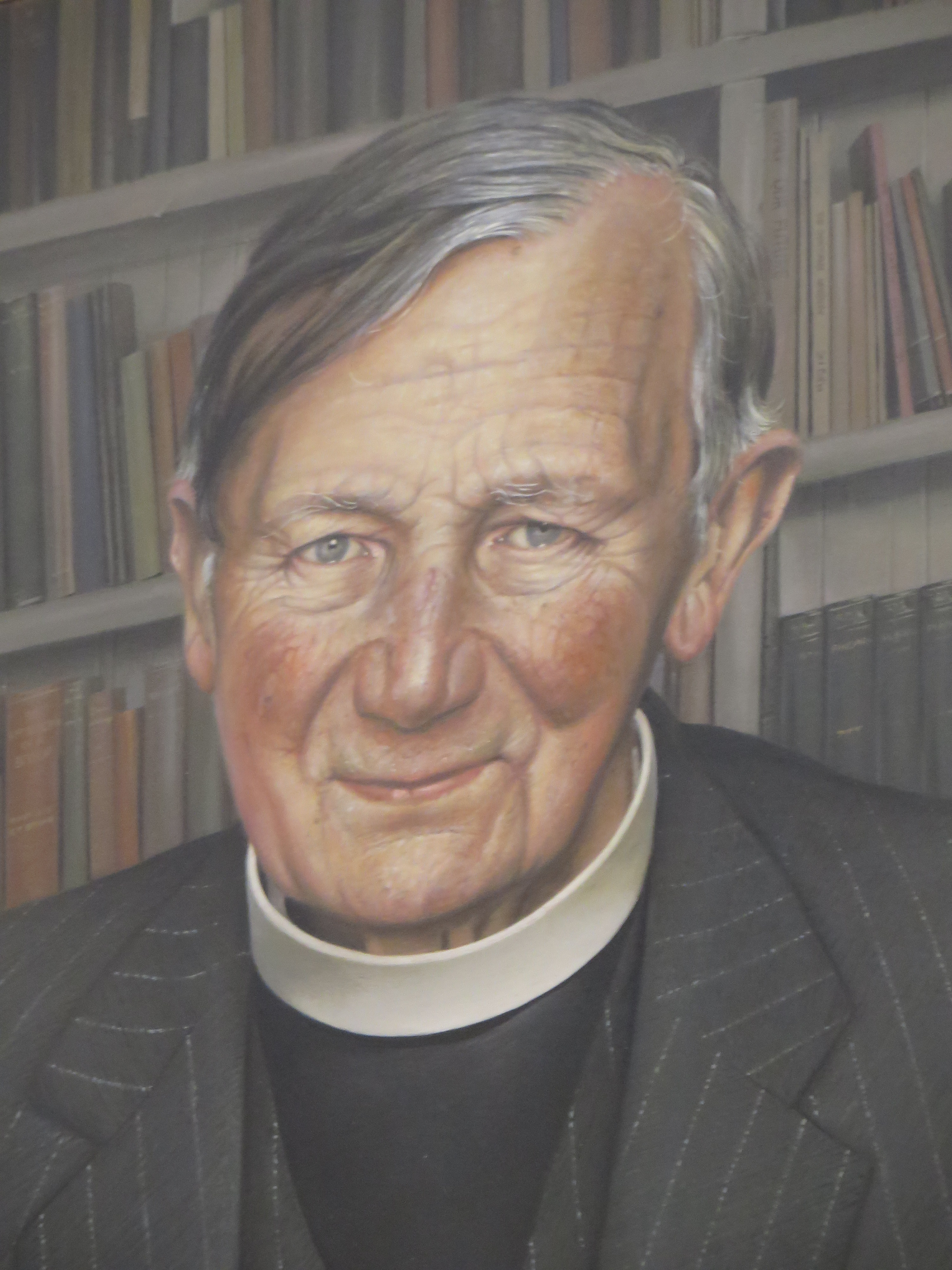
Portrait of Wild at University College, Oxford

The Very Revd. John Herbert Severn Wild (1904–1992) was Dean of Durham and Master of University College, University of Oxford.

J. H. S. Wild was an undergraduate at Brasenose College, Oxford (1923–27) where he studied Greats. He became an assistant curate in Newcastle upon Tyne.

Wild was then a Chaplain Fellow of University College from 1933 to 1945, before becoming Master. He was the only clerical Master of University College during the 20th century and was not a noted academic.

In 1951, he was elected as Dean at Durham Cathedral. He succeeded Cyril Alington, whose eldest son, Giles Alington, was a Fellow at University College from 1944 to 1956, including while Wild was Master. Wild later became Dean Emeritus.

He married Margaret Elizabeth Everard Wainwright, who died on 21 October 2008 at the age of 86.

== Books ==
- A Short Guide to the Cathedral Church of Durham (1957)

Academic offices
Preceded by William Beveridge	Master of University College, Oxford; 1945–1951	Succeeded by Arthur Lehman Goodhart
Church of England titles
Preceded by Cyril Alington	Dean of Durham Cathedral; 1951–1974	Succeeded by Eric William Heaton
Professional and academic associations
Preceded by Frederick Maurice Powicke	President of the Surtees Society; 1962–73	Succeeded by Hilary Seton Offler
