= E. J. Bowen =

English chemist

Edmund John Bowen
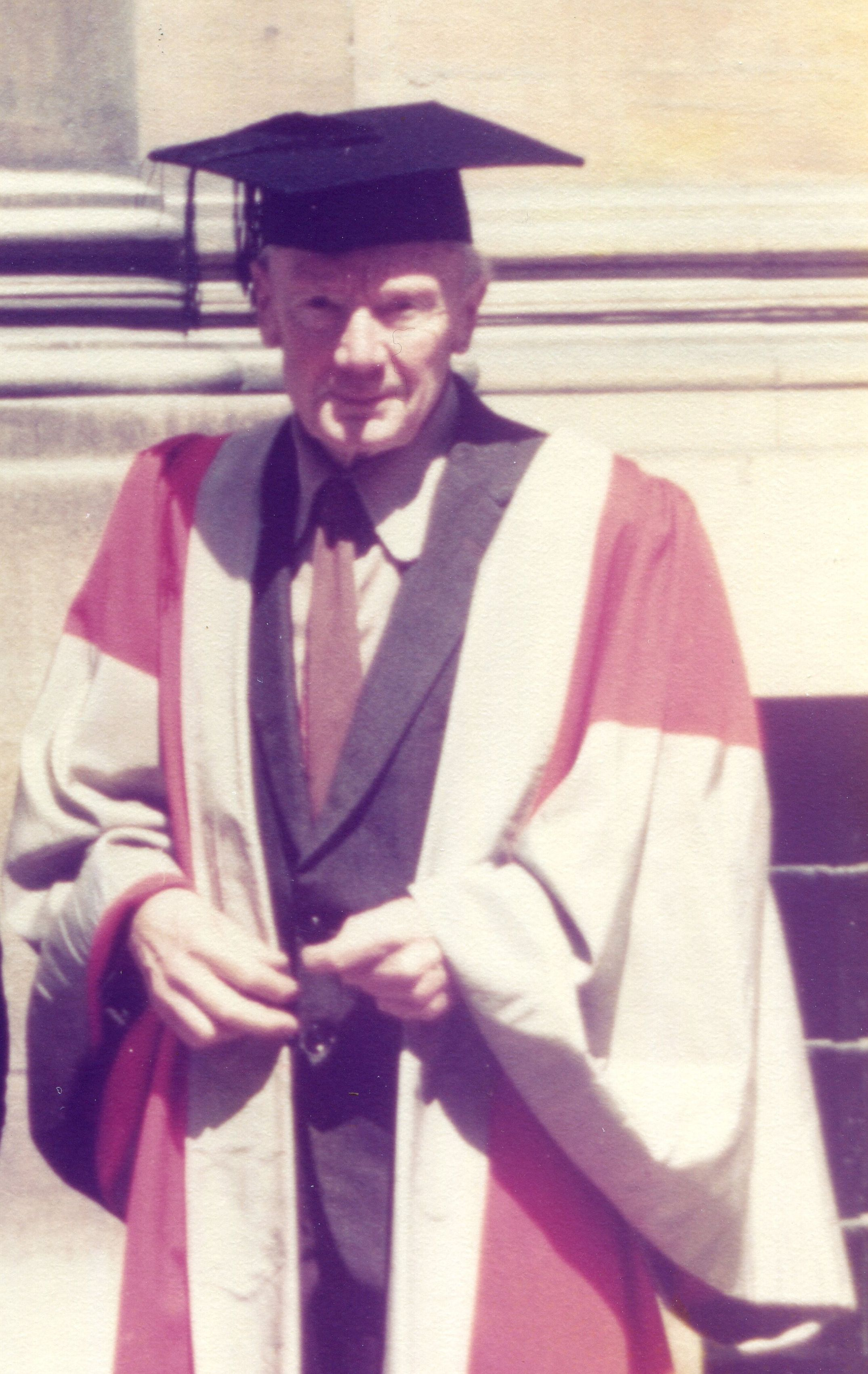
- Ted Bowen in DSc academic dress, Oxford (1977)
- Born: 29 April 1898; Worcester, England
- Died: 19 November 1980 (aged 82); Oxford, England
- Education: Balliol College, Oxford
- Known for: The Chemical Aspects of Light, fluorescence
- Awards: Fellow of the Royal Society (1935); Davy Medal (1963); Liversidge Award (1965/66)
- Scientific career
- Fields: Physical chemistry, photochemistry
- Workplaces: University College, Oxford
- Doctoral advisor: Sir Harold Brewer Hartley
- Doctoral students: Walter Metcalf

Edmund ("Ted") John Bowen FRS (29 April 1898 – 19 November 1980) was a British physical chemist.

== Early life and wartime career ==
E. J. Bowen was the eldest of four born to Edmund Riley Bowen and Lilias Bowen (née Kamester) in 1898 in Worcester, England. He attended the Royal Grammar School Worcester.

He won the Brackenbury Scholarship in 1915 to the University of Oxford where he studied chemistry. In 1916, after less than a year of his undergraduate course, he volunteered for training as a gunner officer and served as Second Lieutenant in the Royal Garrison Artillery during World War I. After being demobilised in 1919, he returned to Balliol College.

== Research career ==
In 1922, Bowen became a Fellow in Chemistry of University College, Oxford, succeeding R. B. Bourdillon, who was briefly Fellow in Chemistry at the College from 1919 to 1921, but who subsequently changed his field of interest from chemistry to medicine. Bowen also served as Domestic Bursar of University College and as Junior Proctor of Oxford University in 1936.

Created a Fellow of the Royal Society in 1935 for his research into fluorescence, he was awarded the Davy Medal in 1963. He wrote a seminal book called The Chemical Aspects of Light. He was Vice-President of the Faraday Society and of the Chemical Society.

Much of Bowen's research work was carried out at the Balliol-Trinity Laboratories in Oxford. He was an accomplished glass blower for his chemical apparatus and even produced artworks in glass. His 1966 Liversidge Lecture on Fluorescence was based on his life's research. After retirement in June 1965, he was elected as an Honorary Fellow of University College on 6 October 1965. He was one of the longest serving Fellows of that college (43 years as an ordinary Fellow and a total of 59 years). There is a room in the college named after him. He was also a prominent Worcester Old Elizabethan serving on its Committee for many years and organising the Oxford branch of that club.

During May 1931, Bowen, then a University don, attended a series of three lectures given by Albert Einstein at Rhodes House in Oxford. After the second lecture on 16 May, he helped rescue the blackboard used by Einstein; Sir Francis Wylie (Warden of Rhodes House) formally presented it to the Museum of the History of Science in Oxford where it remains on prominent display to this day.

As well as chemistry, Bowen also had an interest in geology, especially around Ringstead Bay on the Jurassic Coast in Dorset on the south coast of England. Perisphinctes boweni, an ammonite from the Jurassic period, is named after him. Bowen was involved with the Oxford University Museum of Natural History and produced a scale model of the sun, earth, and moon, for the upper galleries in the museum.

== Later life and death ==
Bowen lived for most of his working life in Park Town and is buried in Wolvercote Cemetery, north of Oxford. Bowen was married to Edith née Moule and they had a son (also a chemist) and a daughter. He died on 19 November 1980 after a short illness.

== Bowen room ==
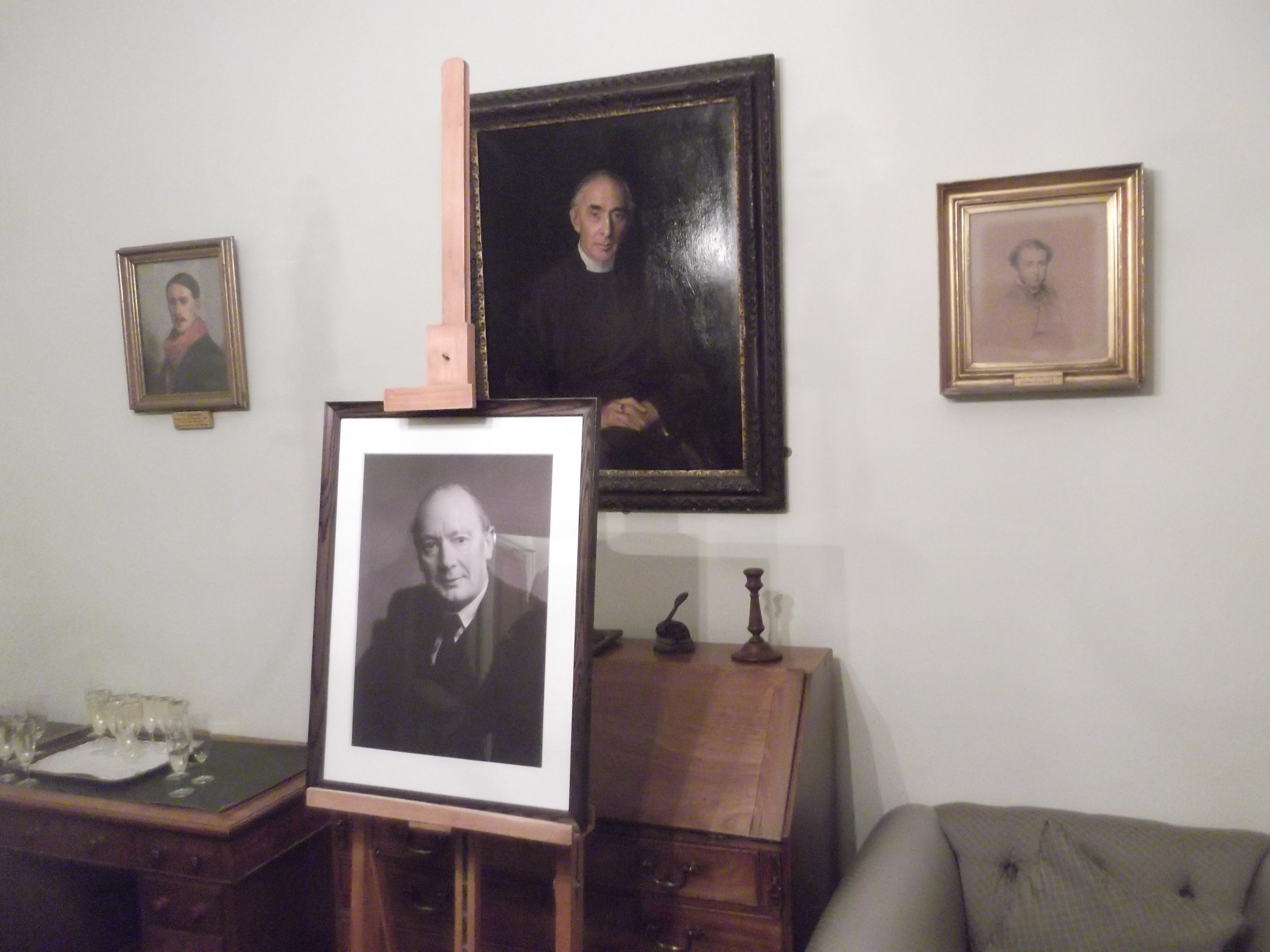
View in Dr Bowen's Room at University College, Oxford, including a photographic portrait of E. J. Bowen held by the National Portrait Gallery, London

The room at University College that Bowen used was subsequently named the 'Bowen room'. It was used by Emeritus Fellows of the college and later occupied by Prof. Ruth Chang. Bowen's papers (1931–1980) are held by the Museum of the History of Science in Oxford.

== Notable co-authors ==
- Sir Cyril Norman Hinshelwood FRS
- Ronald George Wreyford Norrish FRS
- Nevil Vincent Sidgwick FRS
- Sir Harold Warris Thompson FRS

== See also ==
- Ronnie Bell FRS, a physical chemist and Oxford colleague
- John Albery FRS, colleague and successor at University College, Oxford
- Krishna Kamini Rohatgi-Mukherjee, Bowen's DPhil student
- Bowen's son, Humphry Bowen, another chemist
- Bowen's grandson, Jonathan Bowen, a computer scientist
- List of Fellows of the Royal Society elected in 1935
