= Alington =

Alington is a surname, and may refer to:

- Vice Admiral Argentine Alington (1876–1945), British naval officer
- Bill Alington (1929–2024), New Zealand modernist architect
- Cyril Argentine Alington (1872–1955), writer and headmaster of Eton College and Shrewsbury School
- Elizabeth Alington (1909–1990), wife of Prime Minister of the United Kingdom, Alec Douglas-Home
- Giles Alington (disambiguation), multiple people
- Henry Alington (1837–1928), English cricketer and cleric
- Hildebrand Alington, 5th Baron Alington (1641–1723)
- Rev. Hugh Alington, headmaster of Summer Fields School, Oxford, England
- Margaret Alington (1920–2012), New Zealand librarian, historian and author
- William Alington (died 1446), English statesman
- William Alington, 1st Baron Alington (died 1648)
- William Alington, 3rd & 1st Baron Alington (died 1685)

== See also ==
- Baron Alington
- Allington (disambiguation)
