= William Alington =

William Alington or Allington may refer to:

- Sir William Alington (speaker) (died 1446), Speaker of the House of Commons, MP for Cambridgeshire, 1410, 1416, 1429
- William Allington (of Horseheath) (1400–1459), MP for Cambridgeshire, 1433, 1436, 1439?
- Sir William Allington (of Bottisham) (after 1428–1479), Speaker of the House of Commons, MP for Cambridgeshire, 1472, 1477, married Joanne Ansty, daughter of John Ansty, in 1457
- William Alington, 1st Baron Alington (1610/1–1648), Irish peer
- William Alington, 3rd Baron Alington (before 1641–1685), Irish peer, MP for Cambridge, 1664–1685
- Bill Alington (1929–2024), New Zealand modernist architect
- Bill Allington (1903–1966), American Minor league baseball player and manager

== See also ==
- Baron Alington
- Alington (surname)
