= The Soul Cages (story) =

Fairy tale by Thomas Keightley

Folk tale
- Name: The Soul Cages
- Country: Ireland
- Region: Clare
- Origin Date: 1825
- Published in: Fairy Legends and Traditions of the South of Ireland

"The Soul Cages" is a fairy tale invented by Thomas Keightley, originally presented as a genuine Irish folktale in T. Crofton Croker's Fairy Legends and Traditions of the South of Ireland (1825–28).

It features a male merrow (merman) inviting a local fisherman to his undersea home. The "soul cages" in the title refer to a collection of human souls that the merman kept in his home.

The invention of the tale, rather than being a hoax perpetrated on Croker, was a request carried out at Croker's behest, according to Keightley's correspondences. Croker had the idea of Keightley writing up a tale based on the Grimms' German legend "Der Wassermann und der Bauer", after having listened to Keightley's English translation of the Grimms's book, Deutsche Sagen.

== Plot summary ==
The tale is set in Dunbeg Bay (Doonbeg), County Clare. (Note: The setting is identified as "Killard", namely the parish also known as Doonbeg, by Thomas J. Westropp who surveyed the folklore of County Clare.) Jack Dogherty was a fisherman who also scavenged goods by occasional beachcombing. He long yearned to meet a merrow (mermaid), as his father and grandfather had done before. He finally got a glimpse of a male merrow, then discovered he could regularly observe the creature at Merrow's rock on windy days. One such day he was driven to seek refuge in a cave, and came face-to-face with the merrow, who called himself Coomara (meaning "sea-dog"). It had green hair and teeth, a red nose, scaly legs, a fish-tail, and stubby fin-like arms. They spoke at length about their abilities for drinking alcohol and their cellars, and how they both scavenged bottles from shipwrecks.

Coomara arranged a meeting a week later, and arrived carrying two cocked hats. The second hat was meant for Jack to use, since it conferred the wearer the power to submerge in the ocean, and Coo meant to invite Jack to his undersea home. The merman made Jack grab his fish-tail while he dived into the deep. The merman entertained his guest in his shack, which was dry inside with fires going, although the furnishings were crude. The seafood meal was magnificent, and they enjoyed the fine collection of spirits. Jack was then shown a collection of cages (much like lobster pots (Note: "Lobster-pots" are cage-like contraptions.)) which Coomara revealed contained the souls of drowned sailors. Coomara meant no harm, and thought he rescued the souls from the cold water to a dry place. But Jack was horrified and resolved to release the souls.

Jack threw a rock in the sea to summon Coomara, for this had been the signal they agreed upon. Jack had coaxed his wife Biddy to leave the house and go on a religious errand, and was now inviting Coomara to his home. Jack offered spirits from his cellar, and planned on getting the merman drunk while he sneaked out with the cocked hat and go rescue the souls. The first day he did not succeed because Jack himself got overly drunk, forgetting that he did not have the coolness of the sea above his head to moderate the effects of alcohol. The next day, he offered the mermaid the powerful poteen (Note: "potyeen" in text.) he obtained from his brother-in-law, and watered down his own drinking. Jack succeeded in releasing some souls, but his wife returned and became witness to the merman. Jack told his wife his story and was forgiven for the good deed.

The merman seemed not to notice the souls had gone missing. He and Jack met many times after that and Jack continued to release souls. But one day the merman would not respond to the signal of the rock cast into the sea, and was not seen anymore.

== Background ==
Keightley was one of the tale-collectors for Croker, but was never given credit for his service. Keightley subsequently republished "Soul Cages" in his own work, The Fairy Mythology (1828), and in a later edition, admitted that this piece was not genuinely collected folklore, but a tale he invented, based on the German legend of "The Peasant and the Waterman." The German tale (Note: This is noted as being an oral transmission, from Deutschböhmen, i.e. ethnically German parts of Bohemia (cf. Sudetenland); there are similar tales known to about vodník known to Czechs and Slovaks.) was one of Brothers Grimm's Deutsche Sagen, No. 52, "Der Wassermann und der Bauer", (Note: The German-Bohemian tale's Wassermann also collected souls inside pots(Töpfen).) and a translation of it was given by both Croker and Keightley.

Although some commentators represent this as a "hoax" perpetrated by Keightley against Croker, Grimm, and the rest, in letters Keightley wrote to Wilhelm Grimm he maintained that the concoction of this tale was Croker's idea. After Keightley had prepared an English translation of Deutsche Sagen and read it aloud for Croker's benefit, Croker suggested the Wassermann "would make an excellent subject for a tale", and requested Keightley to write it, and he had complied (letter dated 13 June 1828). Croker also modified Keightley's draft (letter dated 1 January 1829).

The question of authenticity is complicated by the fact that Keightley claimed to have found sources afterwards, in the coasts of County Cork and County Wicklow, who knew tales just as Keightley had written them, except the souls were kept in "things like flower-pots" (rather than lobster pots). One scholar, who believed Keightley's confession to have taken place as late as 1878, viewed this as Keightley's "creation" becoming disseminated among the populace during the intervening years and "pass[ing] back into oral tradition". However, in the 1829 letter Keightley explains he "met with two persons different parts of Ireland who were well acquainted with the legend from their childhood", implying the legend existed many years before Keightley invented it. However later search has found no such legend in the Irish regions in question.

Keightley had localized the tale to Dunbeg Bay, County Clare. Thomas Johnson Westropp, who collected folk-belief of mer-folk in County Clare was not able to find instances of this tale near the setting of the tale, in either Doonbeg or Kilkee, but he seemed to regard this tale as genuine despite reservations.

== Later influences ==
So, although a piece of "fakelore", to borrow the coinage of Richard Dorson, the fairy tale nevertheless came to be regarded as authentic, and has been included in a number of folktales anthologies even after Keightley's confession, including W. B. Yeats's, Fairy and Folk Tales of the Irish Peasantry (1888), with Yeats apparently having accepted the tale's authenticity on faith, concluding it must be a tale restricted to a small local area, as he has never run across any similar lore. Kevin Crossley-Holland also selected the tale full knowing Keightley's artifice.

"The Soul Cages" possibly served as the basis for Oscar Wilde's fairy tale "The Fisherman and his Soul", or so it has been contended by literary critic Richard Pine. (Note: Markey (2006), p. 28 and note 35, citing Pine (1996).)

The musician Sting released his album "The Soul Cages" in 1991. The album was an attempt by Sting to deal with his father's death and references his upbringing in Newcastle-Upon-Tyne. The titular song "The Soul Cages" includes the lyrics, "He's the king of the ninth world, The twisted son of the fog bells toll, In each and every lobster cage, A tortured human soul".

== See also ==
vodník – Male water spirit from Slavic mythology

== Footnotes ==
Explanatory notes

Citations

== Bibliography ==
- Croker, Thomas Crofton (1828). "The Soul Cages". Fairy Legends and Traditions of the South of Ireland. Vol. Part II. John Murray. pp. 30–58.
- Crossley-Holland, Kevin (1986) [1985], "The Soul Cages", Folk-tales of the British Isles, New York: Pantheon Books, pp. 14–15, 65–77, ISBN 039456328X
- Denecke, Ludwig [in German] (1987), Brüder Grimm Gedenken, W. Scott, pp. 121–130, ISBN 9783770808601
- Keightley, Thomas (1850) [1828], "The Soul Cages", The Fairy Mythology: Illustrative of the Romance and Superstition of various Countries (new revised ed.), H. G. Bohn, pp. 527–536
- Yeats, William Butler (1888). "The Soul Cages". Fairy and Folk Tales of the Irish Peasantry. W. Scott. pp. 61–75.
