= Baltard =

Baltard may refer to:

== People ==
- Victor Baltard, a French architect of the 19th century
- Louis-Pierre Baltard, Victor Baltard's architect father

== Places ==
- Baltard townland in Ballard, County Clare, Ireland
- Pavillon Baltard, surviving part of the Les Halles designed by Victor Baltard
