= William Compton (army officer) =

English royalist army officer

Sir William Compton (1625 – 18 Oct 1663) was an English royalist army officer. He earned the name of the "godly cavalier" in 1648, from Oliver Cromwell, for his conduct at the siege of Colchester.

== Life ==
Compton was the third son of Spencer Compton, 2nd Earl of Northampton and his wife Mary Beaumont. At the beginning of the First English Civil War, he was directed by his father to take up arms for Charles I, who gave him the command of a regiment. He was in action at the taking of Banbury. He led his men on to three attacks, and had two horses shot under him. On the surrender of the town and castle, he was made lieutenant-governor under his father, and was knighted at Oxford on 12 December 1643.

The parliamentary forces of Northamptonshire, Warwick, and Coventry, came before the town of Banbury on 19 July 1644, but he defied them. A siege lasted thirteen weeks, relieved on 26 October by his brother, James Compton, 3rd Earl of Northampton by that time. Compton continued as governor of Banbury until the king left Oxford, and when the whole kingdom was submitting to the parliament he, on 8 May 1646, surrendered upon honourable terms.

In 1648 he served the king in the Kentish expedition, and in the absence of George Goring, 1st Earl of Norwich commanded as general at Greenwich. As major-general of the king's forces at Colchester, when that town was besieged by General Thomas Fairfax, he kept the garrison in some competent order while they were enduring privations. Compton, after being confined for some time, was set at liberty. Oliver Cromwell called him "the sober young man, and the godly cavalier". He was one of the Sealed Knot who managed all the eight attempts made for the restoration of Charles II from 1652 to 1659. Compton was in prison in 1655, and was again arrested in 1658.

After the Restoration Compton was elected Member of Parliament for Cambridge on 11 March 1661 for the Cavalier Parliament. King Charles II appointed him master of the ordnance.

Compton died suddenly in Drury Lane, London, on 18 October 1663, and was buried at Compton-Wynyates, Warwickshire, where a monument was erected to his memory.

Samuel Pepys, who was Compton's colleague on the Committee for Tangier, was shocked and saddened at his unexpected death, especially since he had seemed to be in perfect health a few days earlier. Pepys praised him as "a man in a thousand", of whom no one ever spoke an ill word. He noted sourly that despite the genuine grief for Compton, the merrymaking at Court continued unabated, and drew the moral that "we all die alike, no more matter being made of the death of one than another".

Compton married Elizabeth (née Tollemache), daughter of Sir Lionel Tollemache, 2nd Baronet and Elizabeth Stanhope, and widow of William Alington, 1st Baron Alington. They had no children. She died in 1671.

Parliament of England
| Preceded by Sir Dudley North; Sir Thomas Wills, 1st Baronet | Member of Parliament for Cambridge; 1661–1664; With: Roger Pepys | Succeeded by The Lord Alington; Roger Pepys |
