= Allington =

Allington may refer to:

== Places in England ==
- Allington, Dorset
- Allington, Hampshire
- Allington, Kent
- Allington, Lincolnshire
- Allington, Kennet, Wiltshire, near Devizes
- Allington, North Wiltshire, near Chippenham
- Allington, Salisbury, Wiltshire
- East Allington, Devon

== People ==
- Bill Allington (1903–1966), American baseball player
- Edward Allington (1951–2017), English artist and sculptor
- Richard Allington, American academic

== Other uses ==
- HMS Allington Castle, a 1944 Royal Navy corvette
- Allington Pippin, an apple cultivar

== See also ==
- The Small House at Allington, an 1864 novel by Anthony Trollope
- Alington (disambiguation)
