= Margaret Alington =

New Zealand historian (1920-2012)

Margaret Alington ONZM
- Born: Margaret Hilda Broadhead; 30 September 1920; Christchurch, New Zealand
- Died: 15 October 2012 (aged 92); Wellington, New Zealand
- Known for: Research into the life and work of Rev. Frederick Thatcher
- Spouse: Bill Alington (m. 1955)

Academic background
- Education: Canterbury University College

Academic work
- Discipline: History

Margaret Hilda Alington ONZM (née Broadhead, 30 September 1920 – 15 October 2012) was a New Zealand librarian, historian and author.

== Life and career ==
Alington was born and educated in Christchurch, New Zealand, the daughter of Henry Dan Broadhead (1889–1967) and Hilda Innes Broadhead, née Stewart (1893–1974). Henry Broadhead was from Peebles, Scotland and came to New Zealand as a child with his family, settling in Christchurch, and rising to become an associate professor of classics at Canterbury University College. He was also an organist who in retirement was a "keen organ builder". Hilda Broadhead's father, James Wyse Stewart (1860-1894), was from Aberdeen, Scotland, settling in New Zealand at Templeton, Christchurch. He was chief engineer of the Islington Freezing Works in Canterbury.

Alington graduated from Canterbury University College with a Bachelor of Arts in 1943. She worked as a librarian in the Canterbury and Auckland University College libraries, Leeds University Library, University of Illinois library (Urbana, US), and the Alexander Turnbull Library (part of the National Library of New Zealand).

Much of Alington's research centred on the life and work of the Revd Frederick Thatcher, architect of New Zealand buildings including St Mary's Church (New Plymouth), and Old St Paul's (Wellington). The culmination of this investigation was Alington's book, An Excellent recruit: Frederick Thatcher, architect, priest and private secretary in early New Zealand, published in 2007. Alington gave an annual lecture on the history of Old St Paul's at the School of Architecture at Victoria University of Wellington from 1978 to 2005.

In 1977, Alington was largely responsible for the formation of The Friends of Bolton Street Cemetery, now Bolton Street Memorial Park, which restored the grounds, buildings and the many grave-sites of well known historical people. She also wrote a detailed history of the cemetery called Unquiet Earth. Alington guided visitors around the cemetery for many years and gave many talks on it. She also wrote a history of St Mary's Church, New Plymouth, called Goodly Stones and Timbers, in 1988.

In the 1999 New Year Honours, Alington was appointed an Officer of the New Zealand Order of Merit, for services to local history. She was a contributor to the Dictionary of New Zealand Biography.

Alington was the wife of New Zealand architect Bill Alington. Their former home, now called Alington House, has been classified as Category I by Heritage New Zealand. It is "an important New Zealand example of Modern Movement architecture."

Alington died at her home in Wellington on 15 October 2012. Her husband, Bill Alington, died in 2024.

== Books ==
- Frederick Thatcher and Old St Paul's (1965)
- Margaret Hilda Alington; William Hildebrand Alington; Dallas James Moor (1968). Old St. Paul's, Wellington: a pictorial record. Friends of Old St. Paul's Society. Friends of Old St. Paul's Society.
- Margaret Hilda Alington (1978). Unquiet Earth: A History of the Bolton Street Cemetery. Wellington City Council. ISBN 978-0-477-06250-3.
- Good Stones and Timbers: A History of St Mary's Church, New Plymouth (1988)
- High Point: St Mary's Church, Karori, Wellington 1866–1991 (1998)
- An Excellent Recruit: Frederick Thatcher, Architect, Priest And Private Secretary In Early New Zealand, with architectural assistance from William H. Alington (2007)
