= Merrow =

Mermaid or merman in Irish folklore

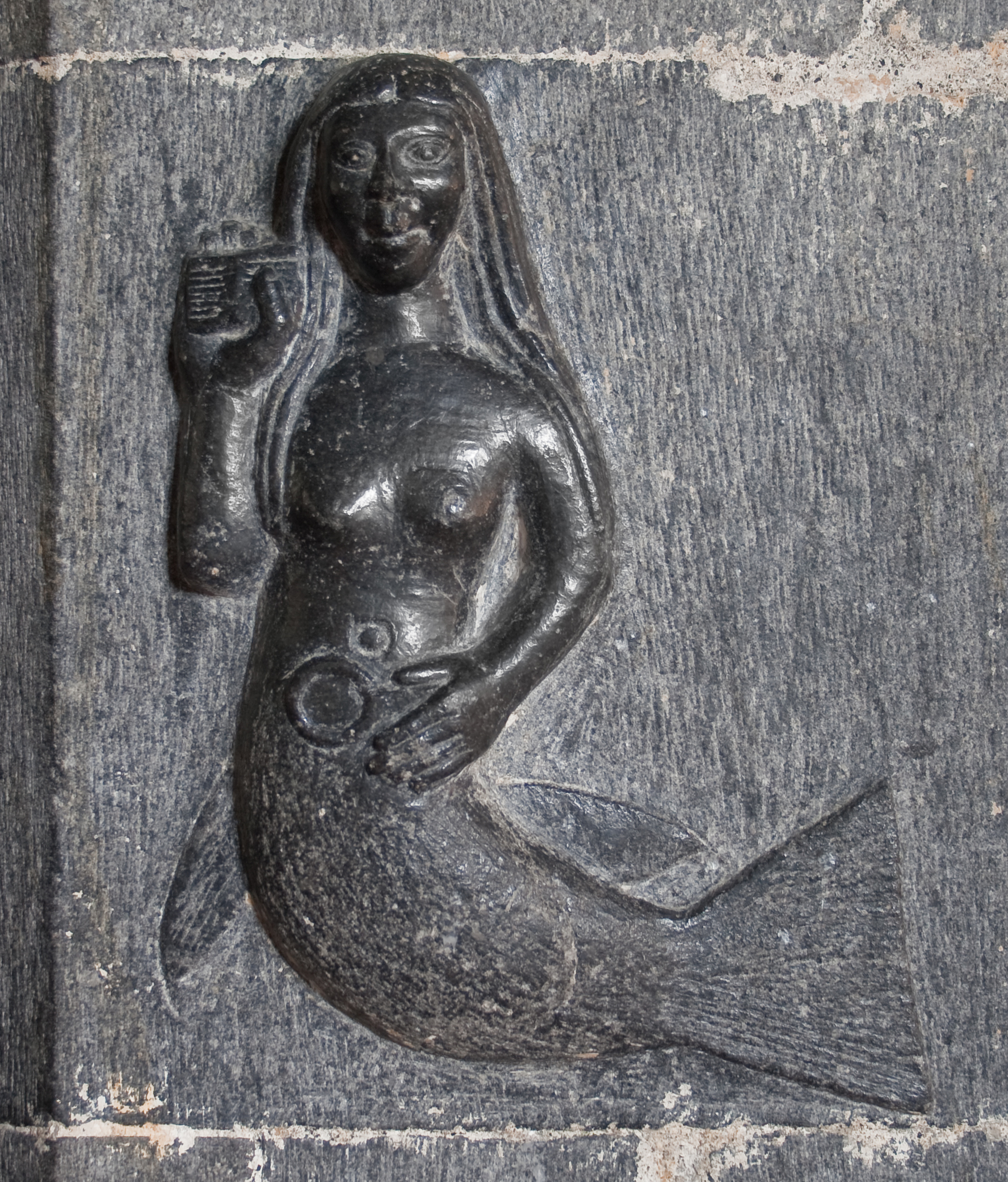
Irish mermaid (bas-relief, Clonfert Cathedral).

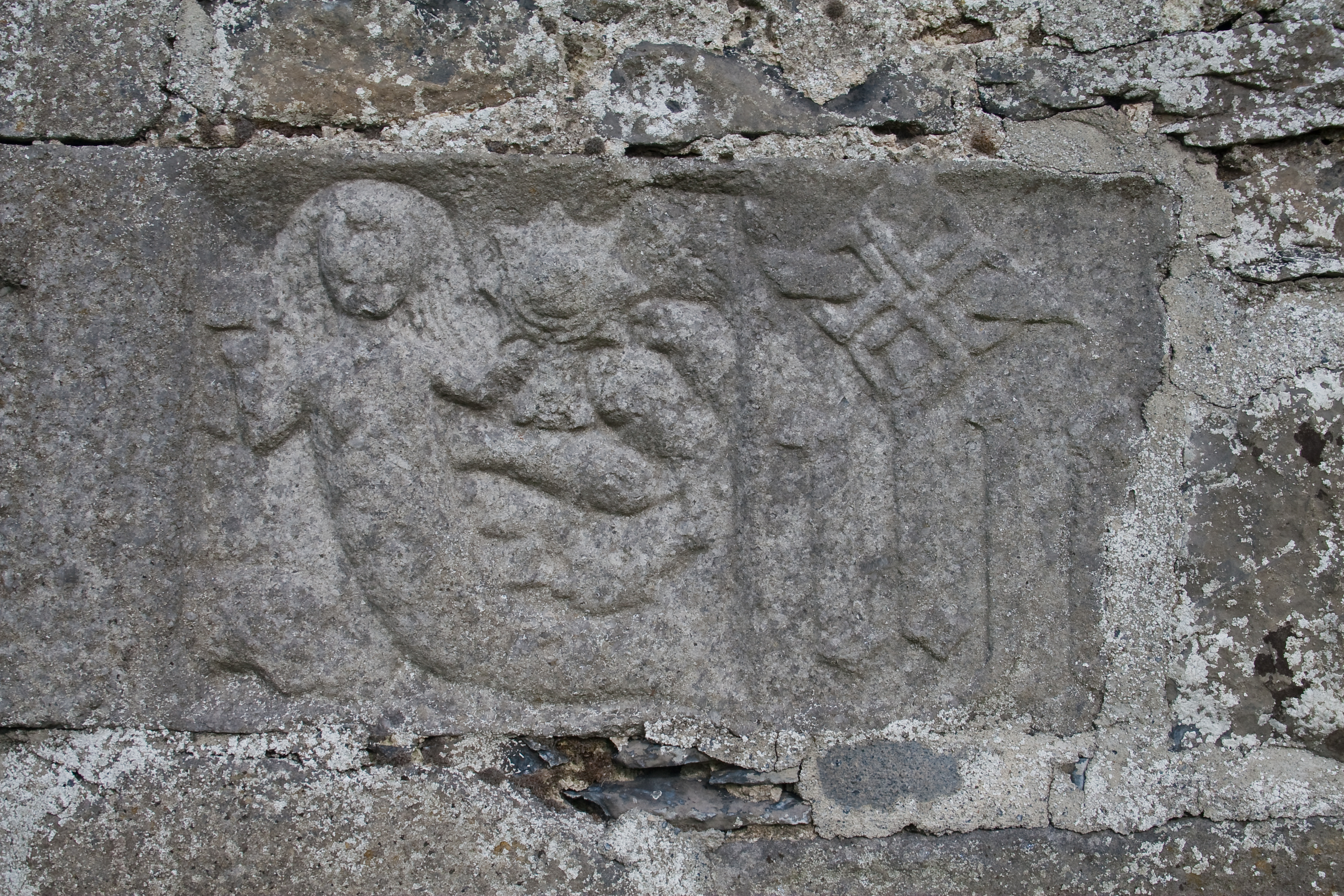
Carving of mermaid (possibly with mirror), Clontuskert Abbey

Merrow (from Irish murúch, Middle Irish murdúchann or murdúchu) is a mermaid or merman in Irish folklore. The term is anglicised from the Irish word murúch.

The merrows supposedly require a magical cap (Irish: cochaillín draíochta; anglicised: cohuleen druith) in order to travel between deep water and dry land.

== Overview ==
The term appears in two tales set in Ireland published in the 19th century: "Lady of Gollerus", where a green-haired merrow weds a local Kerry man who deprives her of the "magical red cap" (cohuleen druith); and "The Soul Cages" where a green-bodied grotesque male merrow entertains a fisherman at his home under the sea.

These tales with commentary were first published in T. C. Croker's Fairy Legends (1828). William Butler Yeats and others writing on the subject borrowed heavily from this work. "The Soul Cages" turned out not to be a genuine folktale, but rather a piece of fiction fabricated by Thomas Keightley.

A number of other terms in Irish are used to denote a mermaid or sea-nymph, some tracing back to mythological tracts from the medieval to the post-medieval period. The Middle Irish murdúchann is a siren-like creature encountered by legendary ancestors of the Irish (either Goidels or Milesians) according to the Book of Invasions. This, as well as samguba and suire are terms for the mermaid that appear in onomastic tales of the Dindsenchas. A muirgheilt, literally "sea-wanderer", is the term for the mermaid Lí Ban.

== Etymology ==
Current scholarship regards merrow as a Hiberno-English term, derived from Irish murúch (Middle Irish murdhúchu or murdúchann (Note: In the past, murdúchu (n-stem feminine) was regarded as the canonical form by certain leading lexicographers, but that has undergone a reassessment in favor of the o-stem murdúchann. The Dictionary of the Irish Language list the headword under "murdúchann, murdúchu" in that order.)) meaning "sea singer" or "siren". But this was not the derivation given by 19th century writers.

According to Croker, "merrow" was a transliteration of modern Irish moruadh or moruach, (Note: Croker gives "morúach, morúadh", but the form without diacriticals conform with O'Reilly's dictionary.) which resolved into muir "sea" + oigh "maid". This "Gaelic" word could also denote "sea monster", (Note: O'Reilley on the entry for moruadh and moruach invokes Shaw's A Galic and English Dictionary, containing all the Words in the Scottish and Irish Dialects of the Celtic that could be collected from the Voice and Old Books and MSS. (1780).) and Croker remarked that it was cognate with Cornish morhuch, a "sea hog". Yeats added murrúghach as an alternative original, as that word is also synonymous with mermaid.

The corresponding term in the Scots dialect is morrough, derived from the Irish, with no original Scottish Gaelic form suggested. (Note: Scottish National Dictionary: Morrough, n. A mythical sea-being [Ir. murbhach, murdhuach, mermaid])

The Middle Irish murdúchann, (from muir + dúchann "chant, song") with its singing melodies that held sway over seamen was more characteristic of the sirens of classical mythology, and was imported into Irish literature via Homer's Odyssey.

== Synonyms ==
The terms muirgeilt, samguba, and suire been listed as synonymous to "mermaid" or "sea nymph". These are Old or Middle Irish words, and usage are attested in medieval tracts. Other modern Irish terms for mermaid are given in O'Reilly's dictionary (1864); one of them, maighdean mhara ("sea-maiden"), being the common term for "mermaid" in Irish today (cf. de Bhaldraithe's dictionary, 1959).

The term muirgeilt, literally "sea-wanderer", has been applied, among other uses, to Lí Ban, a legendary figure who underwent metamorphosis into a salmon-woman.

Strictly speaking, the term samguba in the Dindsenchas example signifies "mermaid's melody". However, O'Clery's Glossary explains that this was rhetorically the "name of the nymphs that are in the sea". The term suire for "mermaid" also finds instance in the Dinsenchas. Croker also vaguely noted that suire has been used by "romantic historians" in reference to the "sea-nymphs" enountered by Milesian ships. (Note: A claim identical to Croker had been made earlier by Vallancey writing in 1786, except the latter identified the historian as Geoffrey Keating. In Keating's History, mermaids (murrdhúchainn) were encountered by Goidels, and in O'Clery's Book of Invasion, mermaids (murduchann) were witnessed by Milesians, but neither are instance of suire being used. It may be noted that O'Clery's glossary does gloss súire as equivalent to murduchann".)

== Folk tales ==
Thomas Crofton Croker's Second Volume to the Fairy Legends (1828) laid the groundwork for the folkloric treatment of the merrow. It was immediately translated into German by the Brothers Grimm. Croker's material on the merrow was to a large measure rehashed by such authors on the fairy-kind as Thomas Keightley, John O'Hanlon, and the poet William Butler Yeats. (Note: Kinahan vaguely puts this as "several volumes [of the Fairy Legends] between 1825 and 1828". To be more precise, the first volume appeared in 1825, followed by a second edition in 1825. The Grimms published the German translation in 1825. Croker produced the second volume in 1828, with additional tales. And the additional tales included the merrow material.) A general sketch of the merrow pieced together by such 19th century authors are as follows.

=== Characteristics ===
The merrow-maiden is like the commonly stereotypical mermaid: half-human, a gorgeous woman from waist up, and fish-like waist down, her lower extremity "covered with greenish-tinted scales" (according to O'Hanlon). She has green hair which she fondly grooms with her comb. She exhibits slight webbing between her fingers, a white and delicate film resembling "the skin between egg and shell".

Said to be of "modest, affectionate, gentle, and [benevolent] disposition", the merrow is believed "capable of attachment to human beings", with reports of inter-marriage. One such mixed marriage took place in Bantry, producing descendants marked by "scaly skin" and "membrane between fingers and toes". (Note: Croker notes that the O'Flaherty and the O'Sullivan clans of County Kerry believed themselves descended from a mixed marriage (with the merrow-kind), and the Macnamaras of County Clare believed their name derived from such ancestry.) But after some "years in succession" they will almost inevitably return to the sea, their "natural instincts" irresistibly overcoming any love-bond they may have formed with their terrestrial family. And to prevent her acting on impulse, her cohuleen druith (or "little magic cap") must be kept "well concealed from his sea-wife".

O'Hanlon mentioned that a merrow may leave her outer skin behind in order to transform into other beings "more magical and beauteous", But in Croker's book, this characteristic isn't ascribed to the merrow but to the merwife of Shetlandic and Faroese lore, said to shed their seal-skins to shapeshift between human form and a seal's guise (i.e., the selkie and its counterpart, the kópakona). Another researcher noted that the Irish merrow's device was her cap "covering her entire body", as opposed to the Scottish Maid-of-the-Wave (Note: Scottish Gaelic: maighdean na tuinne.) who had her salmon-skin.

Yeats claimed that merrows come ashore transformed into "little hornless cows". One stymied investigator conjectured this claim to be an extrapolation on Kennedy's statement that sea-cows are attracted to pasture on the meadowland wherever the merrow resided.

Merrow-maidens have also been known to lure young men beneath the waves, where afterwards the men live in an enchanted state. While female merrows were considered to be very beautiful, the mermen were thought to be very ugly. This fact potentially accounted for the merrow's desire to seek out men on the land.

Merrow music is known to be heard coming from the farthest depths of the ocean, yet the sound travels floatingly across the surface. Merrows dance to the music, whether ashore on the strand or upon the wave.

=== Merrow-men ===
While most stories about merrow are about female creatures, a tale about an Irish merman does exist in the form of "The Soul Cages", published in Croker's anthology. In it, a merman captured the souls of drowned sailors and locked them in cages (lobster pot-like objects) under the sea. This tale turned out to be an invented piece of fiction (an adaptation of a German folktale), although Thomas Keightley who acknowledged the fabrication claimed that by sheer coincidence, similar folktales were indeed to be found circulated in areas of counties Cork and Wicklow.

The male merrow in the story, called Coomara (meaning "sea-hound"), has green hair and teeth, pig-like eyes, a red nose, grows a tail between his scaly legs, and has stubby fin-like arms. Commentators, starting with Croker and echoed by O'Hanlon and Yeats after him, stated categorically that this description fitted male merrows in general, and ugliness ran generally across the entire male populace of its kind, the red nose possibly attributable to their love of brandy.

The merrow which signifies "sea maiden" is an awkward term when applied to the male, but has been in use for a lack of a term in Irish dialect for merman. One scholar has insisted the term macamore might be used as the Irish designation for merman, since it means literally "son of the sea", on authority of Patrick Kennedy, though the latter merely glosses macamore as designating local inhabitants of the County Wexford coast. Gaelic (Irish) words for mermen are murúch fir "mermaid-man" or fear mara "man of the sea".

=== Cohuleen druith ===
Merrows wear a special hat called a cohuleen druith, (Note: The spellings vary from cohuleen driuth" (Croker), "cohuleen druith" (O'Hanlon, Kennedy), to "cohullen duith" (Yeats).) which enables them to dive beneath the waves. If they lose this cap, it is said that they will lose their power to return beneath the water.

The normalized spelling in Irish is cochaillín draíochta, literally "little magic hood" (cochall "cowl, hood, hooded cloak" + -ín diminutive suffix + gen. of draíocht). This rendering is echoed by Kennedy who glosses this object as "nice little magic cap".

Arriving at a different reconstruction, Croker believed that it denoted a hat in the a particular shape of a matador's "montera", or in less exotic terms, "a strange looking thing like a cocked hat", to quote from the tale "The Lady of Gollerus". A submersible "cocked hat" also figures in the invented merrow-man tale "The Soul Cages."

The notion that the cohuleen druith is a hat "covered with feathers", stated by O'Hanlon and Yeats arises from taking Croker too literally. Croker did point out that the merrow's hat shared something in common with "feather dresses of the ladies" in two Arabian Nights tales. (Note: The tales of Jahanshah and Hassan of Bassora.) However, he did not mean the merrow's hat had feathers on them. As other commentators have point out, what Croker meant was that both contained the motif of a supernatural woman who is bereft of the article of clothing and is prevented from escaping her captor. This is commonly recognized as the "feather garment" motif in swan maiden-type tales. The cohuleen druith was also considered to be of red color by Yeats, although this is not indicated by his predecessors such as Croker.

An analogue to the "mermaid's cap" is found in an Irish tale of a supernatural wife who emerged from the freshwater Lough Owel in Westmeath, Ireland. She was found to be wearing a salmon-skin cap that glittered in the moonlight. A local farmer captured her and took her to be his bride, bearing him children, but she disappeared after discovering her cap while rummaging in the household. Although this "fairy mistress" is not from the sea, one Celticist identifies her as a muir-óigh (sea-maiden) nevertheless. (Note: The Celticist, Tom Peete Cross adds that the muir-óigh in Patrick Kennedy's example wears the "magic cap", i.e., the cohuleen druith.)

The Scottish counterpart to the merrow's cap was a "removable" skin, "like the skin of a salmon, but brighter and more beautiful, and very large", worn by the Maid-of-the-wave. It was called in Scottish Gaelic cochull, glossed as 'slough' and "meaning apparently a scaly tail which comes off to reveal human legs", though it should be mentioned that a cochull in the first instance denotes a piece of garment over the head, a hood-cape. (Note: The word cochull denoted a piece of garment (hood-cape). The cochull craicion is explained to be a leather or skin cloak over the head and shoulders, such as became the nickname of Muirchertach mac Néill (na gcochull gcraiceann; 'of the Leather Cloaks', d. 943), a would-be high king. It is pointed out that in Scottish-Gaelic folklore the nickname is applied to fantastical figures, such as the Supernatural Smith (usually identified as Lon mac Liomhtha, the forger of Finn's sword Mac an Buin according to the Duan na Ceardaich ("Lay of the Smithy") in Duanaire Finn. Scottish lore speaks of a certain hag or sea-hag (Scottish Gaelic: Muilghertach, Muirghertach, quite similar sounding to the Irish king's name, and she too is applied the "of the leather cloak" ("A Mhuilgheartach nan cochull craicinn")) in derisive manner in a waulking song. Muilghertach bears resemblance to the sea-ogress margýgr in Old Norse texts, in the opinion of Reidar Thoralf Christiansen.)

The "fishtail-skin" mermaid folklore (as well as that of "seal-skin" seal-woman/selkie) are found all over the Irish and Scottish coasts.

== Medieval writings ==
It did not escape the notice of 19th century folklorists that attestations of murdúchann occur in Irish medieval and post-medieval literature, although they have been somewhat imprecise in specifying their textual sources.

Croker's remark that "the romantic historians of Ireland" depicted suire (synonym of merrow) playing round the ships of the Milesians actually leads to the Book of Invasions, which recounts siren-like murdúchann encountered by legendary ancestors of the Irish people while migrating across the Caspian Sea. O'Hanlon's disclosure of "an old tract, contained in the Book of Lecain [sic]" about the king of the Fomorians encountering them in the Ictian Sea is a tale in the Dindsenchas.

The Annals of the Four Masters (17th cent.), an amalgamation of earlier annals, has an entry for the year 887 that reports that a mermaid was cast ashore on the coast of Scotland (Alba). She was 195 feet (59 m) in length and had hair 18 feet (5.5 m) long; her fingers were 7 feet (2.1 m) long as was her nose, while she was as white as a swan.

The Four Masters also records an entry under year 558 for the capture of Lí Ban as a mermaid; the same event (the capture of the "sea lunatic" Muirgheilt, which is Lí Ban's nickname) is recorded in the Annals of Ulster for the year 571.

=== Invasions of Ireland ===
The medieval Lebor Gabála Érenn ("The Book of Invasions") relates how a band of Goidels on a migratory voyage were stalled on the Caspian Sea by murdúchand (translated as "sirens" by Macalister) who lulled them to sleep with their songs. Wax ear-plugs for the shipmates prescribed by Caicher the Druid proved to be an effective prophylactic.

Even though Caicher the Druid is present in either case, different sets of voyagers, generationally-shifted from each other are engaged in actions with the sirens, depending on the variant text groups. In the First Redaction of Lebor Gabála, the Goidels settled in Scythia embarking on an exodus, led by men such as Lámfhind were the ones upon which the sirens wreaked havoc, while in the Second and Third Redactions, their progeny the Milesians led by Míl Espáine met the same fate. (Note: Kuno Meyer illustrated the similarity to the Odyssey using a quote from the Lebor Gabála, except he merely referred to it as a "tale of the [Irish] Mythological Cycle" found on LL. p. 3a.) (Note: As to which of these version is the more reliable account, Geoffrey Keating's History (ca. 1634) adopted the version where the Scythian Goidels had been the ones who encountered the mermaids (murdúchann), whereas Michael O'Clery's recension of the Book of Invasions use the version where the Milesians meet the mermaids.)

These murdúchand resemble sirens defeated by Odysseus to such a degree, "Homeric influence" is plainly evident.

The medieval scribes of Lebor Gabála eschewed physical descriptions. However, Michael O'Clery's 17th century recension of the Book of Invasions interpolated a decidedly half-fish half-female depiction of the murdúchand in his copy of the Lebor Gabála:

In this wise are those seamonsters, with the form of a woman from their navels upwards, excelling every female form in beauty and shapeliness, with light yellow hair down over their shoulders; but fishes are they from their navels downwards. They sing a musical ever-tuneful song to the crews of the ships that sail near them, so that they fall into the stupor of sleep in listening to them; they afterwards drag the crews of the ships towards them when they find them thus asleep, and so devour them...

— tr. Macalister & MacNeil (1916), p. 205.

=== Dindsenchas ===
There are tales featuring Irish mermaids in the Dindsenchas, collections of onomastic tales explaining the origins of place names. One tale explains how the demise of Roth son of Cithang (Note: Roth was prince of Fomorians according to an alternate text ("Recension B text" published by Thurneysen (1892), Folklore III, p. 489).) by mermaids (murduchann) in the Ictian sea (English Channel) gave birth to the name Port Láirge (now County Waterford). "Port of the Thigh" it came to be called where his thigh washed ashore. The mermaids here are described as beautiful maidens except for their hill-sized "hairy-clawed bestial lower part" below water. (Note: This is the incident in the Ictian sea mentioned by O'Hanlon. Roth originated voyage from the land of Fomorians, and was accompanied by a chieftain. O'Hanlon calls his source the Book of Lecan, and this is one of the manuscripts for the "Prose Tales from the Rennes Dinsenchas #42", considered here.) While one text group only goes as far as to say the mermaids dismembered Roth, (Note: The Rennes Dindsenchas) alternate texts (Note: The Bodleian Dinsenchas; the metrical Dindsenchas.) says that they devoured him, so that only the thigh bone drifted ashore.

Thus, like the mermaids in O'Clery's version, the half-beautiful mermaids here sang sleep-inducing "burdens" or musical refrains, tore their victims apart, and ate them. Whitley Stokes noted that the description of mermaids here coincides with the description of sirens in the Physiologus, or rather the medieval European bestiaries, particularly that of Bartholomaeus Anglicus. (Note: Stokes says the Dindsenchas of Port Láirge matches the description of mermaids in the Physiologus, but he specifically cites Medieval Lore, p. 136, which is acutually the "siren" section in the epitome to the bestiary of Bartholomaeus.)

There are several onomastic tales which attempts to explain the name origin of Ess Ruaid (Assaroe Falls), one of which involves mermaid music (samguba). It purports a woman named Ruad who rowed out to the estuary was lulled to sleep by the "mermaid's melody" and drowned in the spot, which received its name after her.

The Dindsenchas of Inber n-Ailbine (estuary of Delvin River, County Dublin) is counted as a mermaid tale, though no "mermaid" term specifically occurs. Nine women dwelling in the sea held immobilized the fleet of three ships led by Rúad son of Rígdonn, a grandson of the king of the Fir Muirig people. (Note: Rúad mac Rigduind meic rig Fer Muirigh. O'Curry has attempted to localize the Fir Muirig / Fera Muiridh to the seacoast between Howth and the River Shannon, later to be called Ciannachta. The argument is based on identifying these mermaids' island home to be "Inis fianchuire" of Oidhe Chloinne Tuireann equivalent to "Inis Caire Cenn-fhinne" in the Book of Lecan said to lie undersea between Ireland and Alba (Scotland).) Rúad lay with the beautiful women, but he made an empty promise to carry on their tryst. The women arrived by boat to exact vengeance on Rúad, but frustrated, slew two of his sons instead, including the child one of them had borne. The episode is also embedded in the story The Wooing of Emer of the Ulster Cycle.

== Popular culture ==
- Merrow have appeared in the core rules of various classic editions of the Dungeons & Dragons role-playing game. They are essentially just aquatic ogres, and thus only the brutish male merrow of real-world mythology are properly represented therein.
- In the Magic: The Gathering card game, "Merrows" are a type of merfolk, native to the plane of Lorwyn/Shadowmoor. They are friendly, white/blue-aligned freshwater merchants, healers, and guides, dwelling in the clear streams of the "sunny" aspect of the plane (Lorwyn), and mischievous, blue/black-aligned brackish water looters and assassins dwelling in the bogs of the "dusk" aspect of the plane (Shadowmoor).
- In the Puyo Puyo games, "Merrow" (メロウ) is a type of mermaid, part of the Scales Fish People (うろこさかなびと). One of the other Scales Fish People is Seriri, a blue haired mermaid. Unlike Seriri, Merrow has a pink hair and a more haughty look. A pink mermaid is the first mermaid to appear in the Madou Monogatari games, that predate the Puyo Puyo games.
- Jennifer Donnelly's fantasy series the Waterfire Saga has an ancient mermaid ruler in its mythology named Merrow. Merrow was the first regina in the fictional place of Miromara in the series.
- In the Harry Potter tie-in book Fantastic Beasts and Where to Find Them, merrows are said to be one of three subspecies of merpeople, along with Scottish selkies and Greek sirens.
- In Kentaro Miura's manga Berserk, Merrow are the name given to a race of mer-folk.
- In Jess Kidd's "Things in Jars", the merrow is a pale girl with eyes that change color between white and black. She has sharp, fish like teeth, and frequently bites. Her bite is fatally poisonous to men, but not women. She also has some control over water, and causes the river in London to rise, threatening a flood. She attracts snails and newts, which she eats.
- In Bayonetta Origins: Cereza and the Lost Demon, a Múruch is a rare faerie creature who has the reputation of having a power of a one-faerie army. Faerie kings often allied themselves to this kind of creature, and this was an easy way of becoming the next faerie king.
- In Nioh and Nioh 2 there is a guardian spirit that resembles the Merrow called Saoirse that follows William.
- The Sirens (2025), a novel by Emilia Hart, a historical novel with elements of magical realism that features Irish merrows, and includes elements of selkie myths.
- In Waking The Merrow (Merrow Trilogy #1) by Heather Rigney, homocidal beings called Merrows stalk a village.
- In Hidden Scales (Merrows #1) by A.M. Robin, an eleven-year-old girl named Mira discovers silver scales creeping up her foot, triggering a curse that reveals her merrow heritage.

== See also ==
- Mermaid
- Merman
- Selkie

== Bibliography ==
=== General ===
- Croker, Thomas Crofton (1828). "The Merrow". Fairy Legends and Traditions of the South of Ireland. Vol. Part II. John Murray. pp. 3–84.
- Keightley, Thomas (1850) [1828]. The Fairy Mythology: Illustrative of the Romance and Superstition of various Countries (new revised ed.). H. G. Bohn. pp. 370, 527ff.
- Kickingereder, Stephanie (2008). The Motif of the Mermaid in English, Irish, and Scottish Fairy- and Folk Tales (PDF) (Mag. Phil.). Universität Wien. pp. 48–.
- Meyer, Kuno, ed. (1885), Cath Finntraga, Clarendon Press, pp. 77–78, 106, ISBN 9780404639549
- O'Hanlon, John (1870), "VII: The Merrow-maiden and the Merrow-man", Irish folk lore: traditions and superstitions of the country, pp. 56–59
- O'Donovan, John, ed. (1856), Annals of the Kingdom of Ireland, vol. 1 (2 ed.), Hodges, Smith, and Co., p. 201
- Yeats, William Butler (1888), Fairy and Folk Tales of the Irish Peasantry, W. Scott

=== Dindsenchas ===
- Gwynn, Edward, ed. (1913). The Metrical Dindsenchas: Part III. Todd Lecture Series. Vol. X. pp. 190–193.
- O'Reilly, Edward; O'Donovan, John, eds. (1864), An Irish-English Dictionary (new revised ed.), Duffy
- Stokes, Whitley, ed. (1892), "The Bodleian Dindsenchas", Folk-lore, 3: 489–490 (#23)
- ——, ed. (1894), "The Rennes Dindsenchas", Revue Celtique, 15: 294–295 (#5), 432–434 (#42)
- ——, ed. (1895), "The Rennes Dindsenchas", Revue Celtique, 16: 31–33 (#81)
- O'Curry, Eugene, ed. (1863), "The Fate of the Children of Tuieann", Atlantis, 4: 190, note3, 235– (III. Note on the River Ailbhiné gives text and translation of Book of Ballymote version, followed by notes).
