= Doonbeg =

Village in County Clare, Ireland

Doonbeg An Dún Beag
- Village
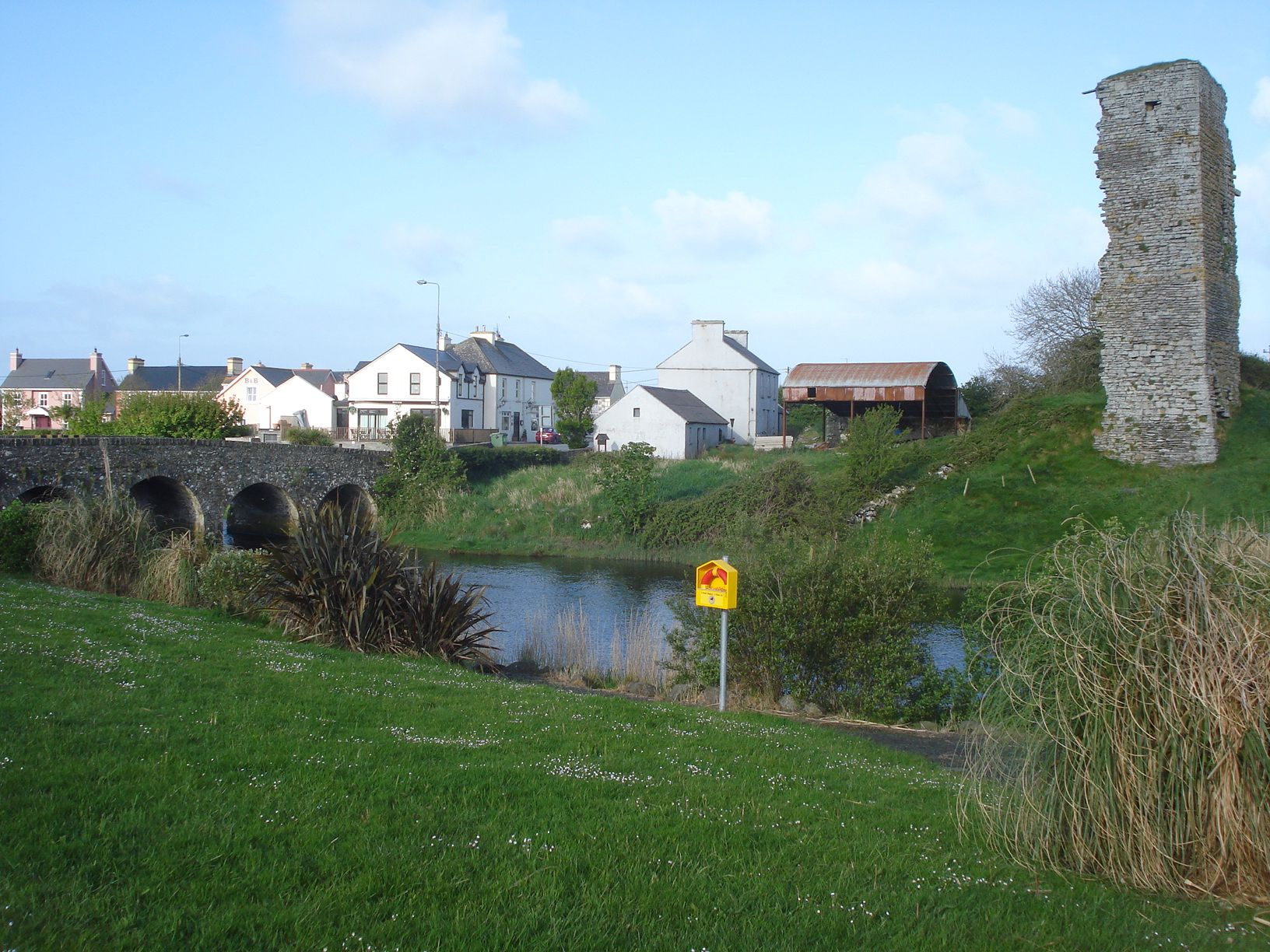
- Doonbeg River flows through Doonbeg village

- Location in Ireland
- Coordinates: 52°44′N 9°31′W
- Country: Ireland
- Province: Munster
- County: County Clare

Population (2022)
  - Total: 279
- Time zone: UTC+0 (WET)
  - Summer (DST): UTC-1 (IST (WEST))
- Irish Grid Reference: Q971655

Doonbeg (Irish: An Dún Beag, meaning 'small fort') is a village in west County Clare, Ireland on the Atlantic coast. The surrounding natural environment has supported its development as a tourist resort. The area was officially classified as part of the West Clare Gaeltacht, an Irish-speaking community, until 1956.

== Location ==
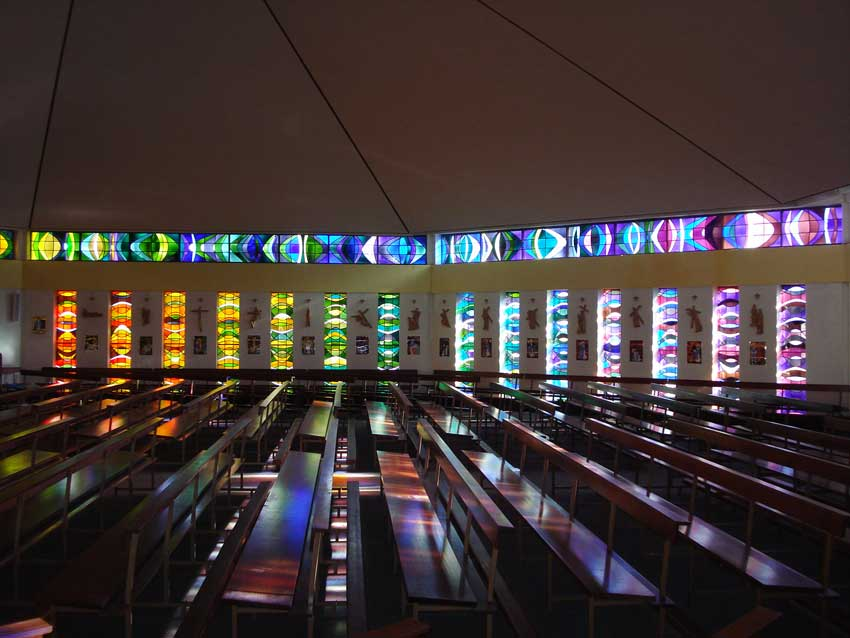
Stained glass on the front side of the Church of Our Lady Assumed into Heaven

Doonbeg is situated on the N67 between the towns of Kilkee and Milltown Malbay. The nearest large towns are Kilrush and Kilkee, which are both approximately 10 kilometres (6 mi) away.

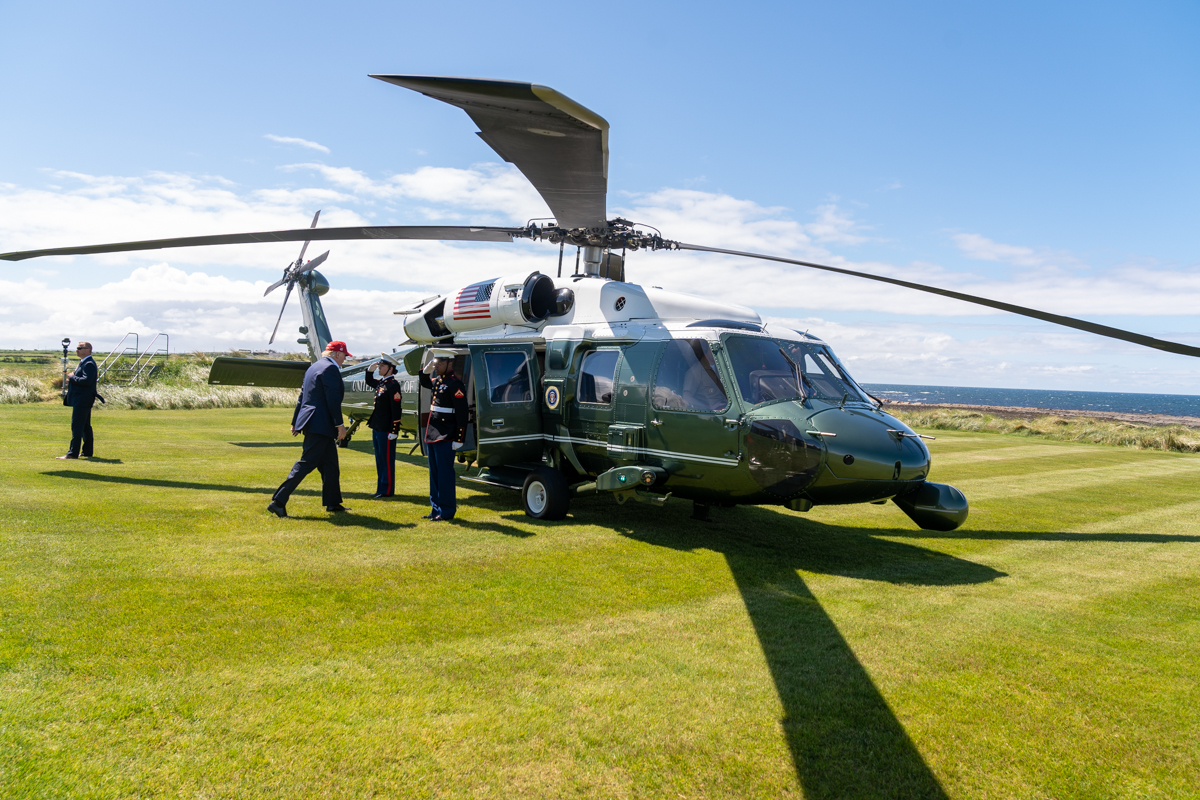
US President Donald Trump boarding a helicopter at his resort in Doonbeg in June 2019

The village is located in civil parish of Killard. It is part of the parish of Doonbeg (Killard) in the Roman Catholic Diocese of Killaloe.

Doonbeg is surrounded by farmland, some of which is used for dairy farming. There is also an area of bogland near the village. The Doonbeg River flows through the village and enters the Atlantic Ocean at the nearby Doonbeg Bay.

== History ==
Evidence of ancient settlement in the area include a number of ringfort sites in the surrounding townlands of Doonbeg, Doonmore and Mountrivers.

A settlement has existed at the site of the current village, at the river crossing in Doonbeg townland, since medieval times. The village name Dun Beag, or small fort, may refer to Doonbeg Castle or an earlier fortification located at the river crossing. Now in ruin, Doonbeg Castle was built in the 16th century, and has been historically associated with the MacMahon and O'Brien clans.

In A Topographical Dictionary of Ireland, published by Samuel Lewis in 1837, Doonbed is described as a village of 213 inhabitants. The entry notes that the "river Dunbeg flows into the harbour and is here crossed by a good bridge, near which stand the ruins of a lofty castle, formerly a defence to the harbour, and one of the ancient strong holds of the O'Briens". Lewis describes Doonbeg's harbour as a "place of refuge for small craft in bad weather" with a "station of the coast-guard". Fairs held at the time were "for general farming stock, and for flannel and frieze of home manufacture". The entry, which gives a picture of the village before the Great Famine, states that village contains an "R. C. [Roman Catholic] chapel, and about a quarter of a mile from it is the newly erected parochial church". The pier described by Lewis is not the current pier, but was on the eastern side of Doonbeg bay, and was washed away in a storm. Similarly, the Catholic chapel was demolished when the new church was built.

== Amenities ==
The village holds the church of Our Lady Assumed into Heaven. It is a modern church, noteworthy for the stained-glass windows that are uniquely designed so that the various colours illuminate the altar throughout the day. The church was built in 1976 and has an uncommon octagonal shape. It replaced the older cross-shaped church that was built in 1813.

Doonbeg also has several pubs, Doonbeg National School, two shops, a post office and a village hall and a tourist office. The central point of the village is an early 19th-century seven-arched stone bridge which crosses the Doonbeg River and divides the village. The crossing is overlooked by the remaining fortifications of Doonbeg castle.

== Transport ==
Doonbeg was on the West Clare Railway line that connected Ennis to Kilrush and Kilkee, which closed in 1961. The old train station, approximately 2km east of the village, is marked by a plaque and is now a private house. There is also an old railway bridge over the Creegh river here.

Bus Éireann route number 333 runs from Ennis to Kilkee along the route of the West Clare Railway, connecting the village to Kilkee to the south and Ennis via Lahinch and Kilfenora with multiple services each way daily. Bus Éireann route number also 336 runs from Ennis to Doonbeg via Kilkee via the N68 with multiple services each way daily. There are also TFI Local Link buses to Kilkee and Kilrush.

== Sport ==
Gaelic football is popular in Doonbeg. The main playing area is the Shanahan McNamara Memorial grounds which are located outside the village. Doonbeg GAA is among the most successful Gaelic football clubs in the Clare Senior Football Championship, having won 18 county titles. Doonbeg's football team is known as "The Magpies" because of the black and white shirts which are traditionally worn.

Trump International Golf Links and Hotel Ireland, formerly Doonbeg Golf Club, is situated outside the village.

Doonbeg is home to one of Clare's best-known surf beaches, known locally as "Doughmore". The beach includes hazards such as strong rip currents and has been signposted as "dangerous for bathing" by Clare County Council. The beach runs parallel to Doonbeg Golf Course which must be crossed in order to get onto the beach.

== Tourism ==
Cultural events in the village and area include the Willie Keane Memorial Weekend (in October), a jazz festival (in June), and the West Clare Drama Festival (which was established in 1962).

In the outlying parish, scenic areas include the cliffs of Ballard and Killard and the White Strand beach which is located in the townland of Killard. Surfing has become common in recent times along the northern coastline of the parish.

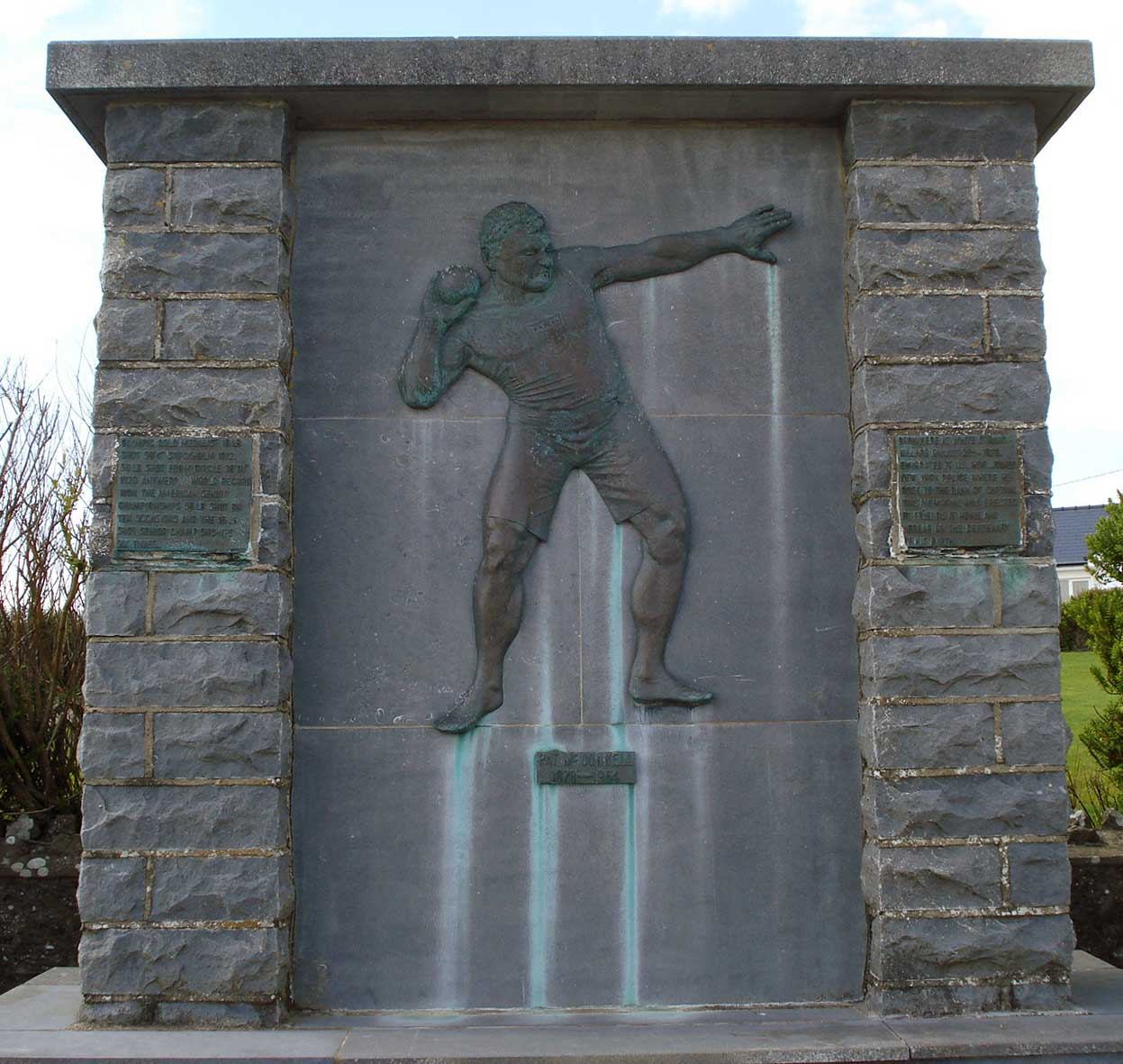
Pat McDonald Memorial at White Strand, Doonbeg

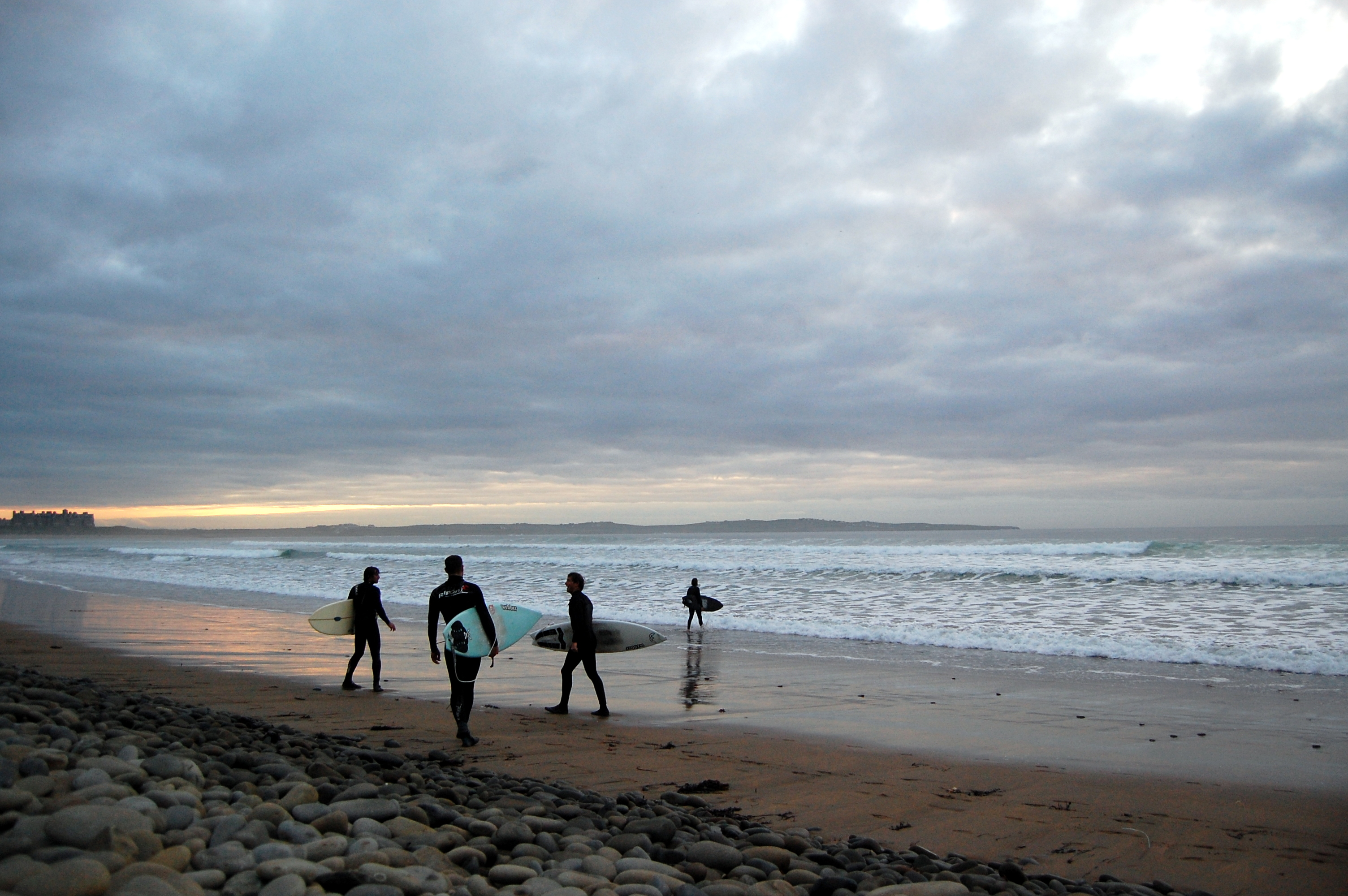
Surfers survey the waves at Doonbeg (Doughmore) beach.

The White Strand beach in Killard attracts visitors during the summer. Nearby there is a monument to Pat McDonald who was born in Killard and won an Olympic Gold Medal representing the US in Men's Shot Put. When he won his Olympic gold medal in 1920, he was aged 42, making him the oldest Olympic track & field champion ever.

There are picnic areas on the banks of the river near the bridge. Fishing is also possible in the river and around the coastal area of Doonbeg, with shore fishing from the Blue Pool in Ballard.

== Notable people ==
- David Tubridy – Clare footballer who became top scorer in National Football League history against Cork in May 2021 his total score in the competition after this game (22–412, i.e. 478 points) causing him to overtake Mickey Kearins
- Tommy Tubridy – Clare footballer and father of David
- Barney McMahon – Brigadier General, Irish Air Corps

== See also ==
- List of towns and villages in Ireland
