= Hildebrand Alington, 5th Baron Alington =

Irish peer and army officer

Hildebrand Alington
- Baron Alington of Killard
- Tenure: 1691–1723
- Predecessor: Giles Alington, 4th Baron Alington
- Successor: Title Extinct
- Born: 3 August 1641
- Died: 11 February 1723 (aged 81)
- Parents: William Alington, 1st Baron Alington; Elizabeth Tollemache

Captain Hildebrand Alington, 5th Baron Alington of Killard (3 August 1641 – 11 February 1722/23) was an Irish peer, the son of William Alington, 1st Baron Alington of Killard, and Lady Alington, the former Elizabeth Tollemache. He was one of the couple's youngest children, and his forename was a family name that honoured their Norman ancestor, Sir Hildebrand de Alington. He became an army officer, receiving a captain's commission from King James II of England in 1685.

Hildebrand succeeded to the Irish title of 5th Baron Alington on 18 September 1691, on the death of his nephew, the 4th Baron, who had died without male issue; the English peerage became extinct.

In 1700, he sold part of his estate, possibly anticipating the extinction of the title. He never married, though his elder brother William had urged him to, and on his death the Irish Barony, Alington of Killard, also became extinct.

Peerage of Ireland
Preceded by Giles Alington	Baron Alington of Killard; 1691–1722/23	Extinct
