= Giles Alington =

Giles Alington may refer to:

- Giles Alington (MP) (1500–1586)
- Giles Alington, 2nd Baron Alington (c. 1641–1659)
- Giles Alington, 4th Baron Alington (1680–1691), Irish peer
- Giles Allington, the Ancient Planter
- Giles Alington (academic) (1914–1956), Fellow of University College, Oxford

== See also ==
- Giles Green of Allington, Dorset, 17th Century MP
