= Barney McMahon =

Irish Defence Forces officer (1928–2010)

Barney McMahon DSM
- Born: 1 December 1928; Doonbeg, County Clare
- Died: 25 October 2010 (aged 81); Templeogue, Dublin
- Spouse: Cecelia
- Children: 2 sons, 2 daughters
- Military career
- Allegiance: Ireland
- Branch: Irish Air Corps
- Service years: 1949-1989
- Rank: Brigadier general
- Commands: GOC, Irish Air Corps (1984-1989); Director of Military Aviation (1984-1989)
- Awards: DSM with Merit; Ordre national du Mérite

Brigadier General Brian "Barney" McMahon DSM (1 December 1928 – 25 October 2010) was an Irish Defence Forces officer and former General Officer Commanding the Air Corps. He joined the Irish Air Corps in 1949 as a cadet and qualified as a pilot in 1952. In 1962 he was one of two pilots sent to collect from France the Corps' first helicopters, two Aérospatiale Alouette III aircraft. McMahon flew these for the Corps' Air Sea Rescue Unit including a cliff rescue mission for which he was awarded the Distinguished Service Medal with Merit. He was also awarded the Ordre national du Mérite for his work in promoting Franco-Irish co-operation in military aviation.

== Early life and career ==
McMahon was born on 1 December 1928 and grew up in Doonbeg, County Clare. He was educated at St Flannan's College in Ennis and joined the Irish Air Corps in 1949 as a cadet. McMahon's instructor recommended him for a commission, as "his energetic and enthusiastic approach to his work is bound to influence others", and he qualified as a pilot in 1952.

== Air Sea Rescue ==
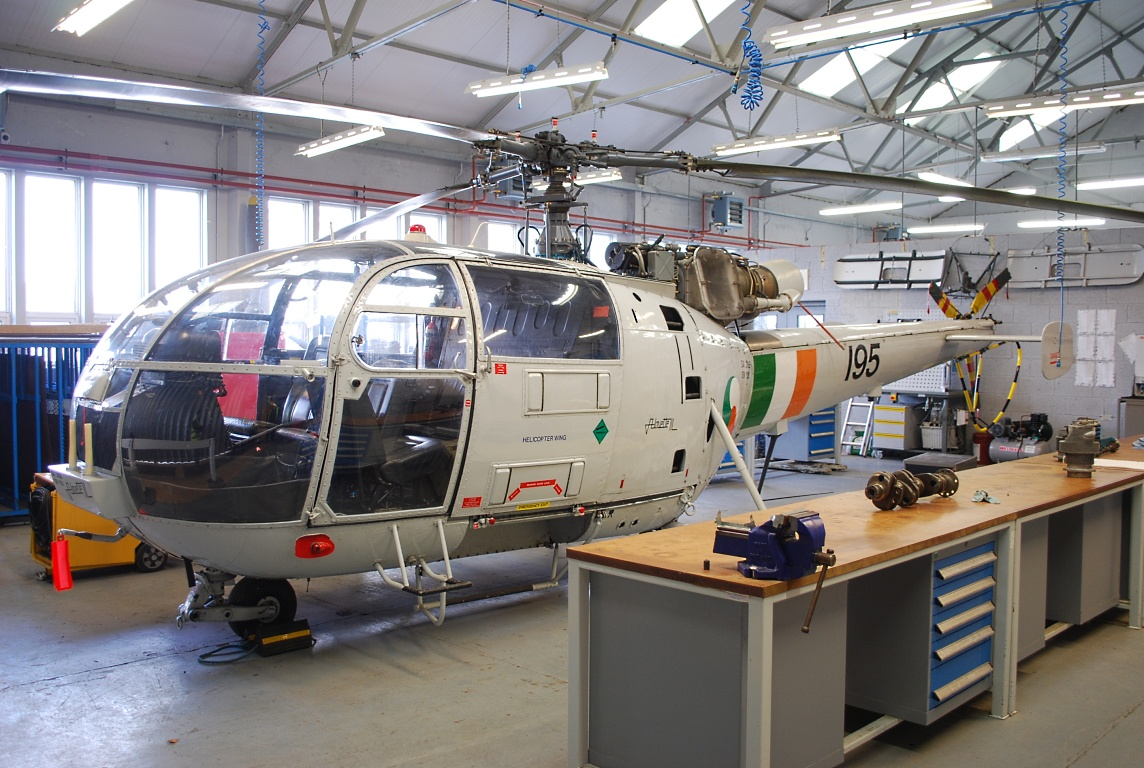
Aircraft A195 in 2011

In 1962 McMahon was appointed chief flying instructor for the Air Corps, based at Gormanston Camp, County Meath. Around the same time he became flight commander of the corps' Air Sea Rescue Unit, with the rank of commandant. Towards the end of November 1962 he travelled to Marseille, France, with Lieutenant John Kelly, to collect a pair of Aérospatiale Alouette III helicopters (tail numbers A195 and A196). These were the first helicopters in Irish Air Corps service and were flown to Ireland by the two officers.

Whilst still training on the new aircraft at Baldonnel Aerodrome, McMahon was, on 23 December 1962, called out to a search and rescue mission off the Connemara coast. A French fishing vessel, the Emerance, had lost power and was drifting towards rocks in heavy seas. Her 16-man crew had abandoned ship into inflatable life boats but their position was not known. McMahon, who flew the mission with Lieutenant O'Connor, later said that "we were a bit bloody mad to be taking the mission on ... We had very limited communications and an atrocious radio which took the heads off us as we had no helmets. We had no life raft and 1916 life jackets". The mission was McMahon's first with the Air Sea Rescue unit and he and his crews had not yet flown regularly over the Irish Sea, let alone the wilder Atlantic.

McMahon conducted an unsuccessful search and returned to land when he ran low on fuel. A supply of aviation fuel had been sent to Renmore Barracks but McMahon found he had too little left to make it there. He landed at a Gaelic handball court in Clifden. Knowing it would take six hours for aviation fuel to be sent there from Baldonnel, McMahon sought out a local garage and purchased 120 imperial gallons (550 L; 140 US gal) of petrol for his aircraft. He mixed this with a quantity of paraffin procured from the town's priest and filtered the mixture through a pair of tights, possibly supplied by the garage owner's wife. The improvised fuel allowed McMahon to take-off and resume the search. The missing life rafts were eventually found by another French fishing boat and their crew rescued. The handball alley afterwards became an unofficial landing spot for the Air Sea Rescue Unit and later became a fuel depot for the company Irish Helicopters.

McMahon was awarded the Distinguished Service Medal with Merit for rescuing a man with a broken leg from a cliff at Glendalough. He was commended for exhibiting "a high degree of courage, exceptional flying skills and a disregard for personal safety" during the operation in which he flew his helicopter within 2 feet (0.61 m) of the cliff face. He was also awarded the French Ordre national du Mérite for his work in promoting Franco-Irish co-operation in military aviation.

McMahon was responsible for introducing an air ambulance service to Ireland, the first in Europe, for transporting patients with spinal injuries to the National Rehabilitation Hospital in Dublin. As part of this work he devised, with doctors, a stretcher to be used by the air ambulance and arranged for helipads to be installed at or near all Irish hospitals.

== Later career and life ==
McMahon retired from operational flying in 1970, afterwards serving in administrative roles. In 1984, he was appointed General Officer Commanding the Air Corps and Director of Military Aviation, and promoted to brigadier general. McMahon retired in 1989. He returned to Baldonnel (by then named Casement Aerodrome) on 21 September 2007 for a ceremony to mark the retirement of the Alouette III from Irish Defence Force service.

McMahon died on 25 October 2010. He was by this time a widower, his wife Cecelia having predeceased him. He was a father of two sons and two daughters; one of McMahon's sons died of a heart attack two days after him. McMahon was buried in Bohernabreena Cemetery, Dublin, following a funeral service at St Pius X Church, Templeogue.
