= Alington House =

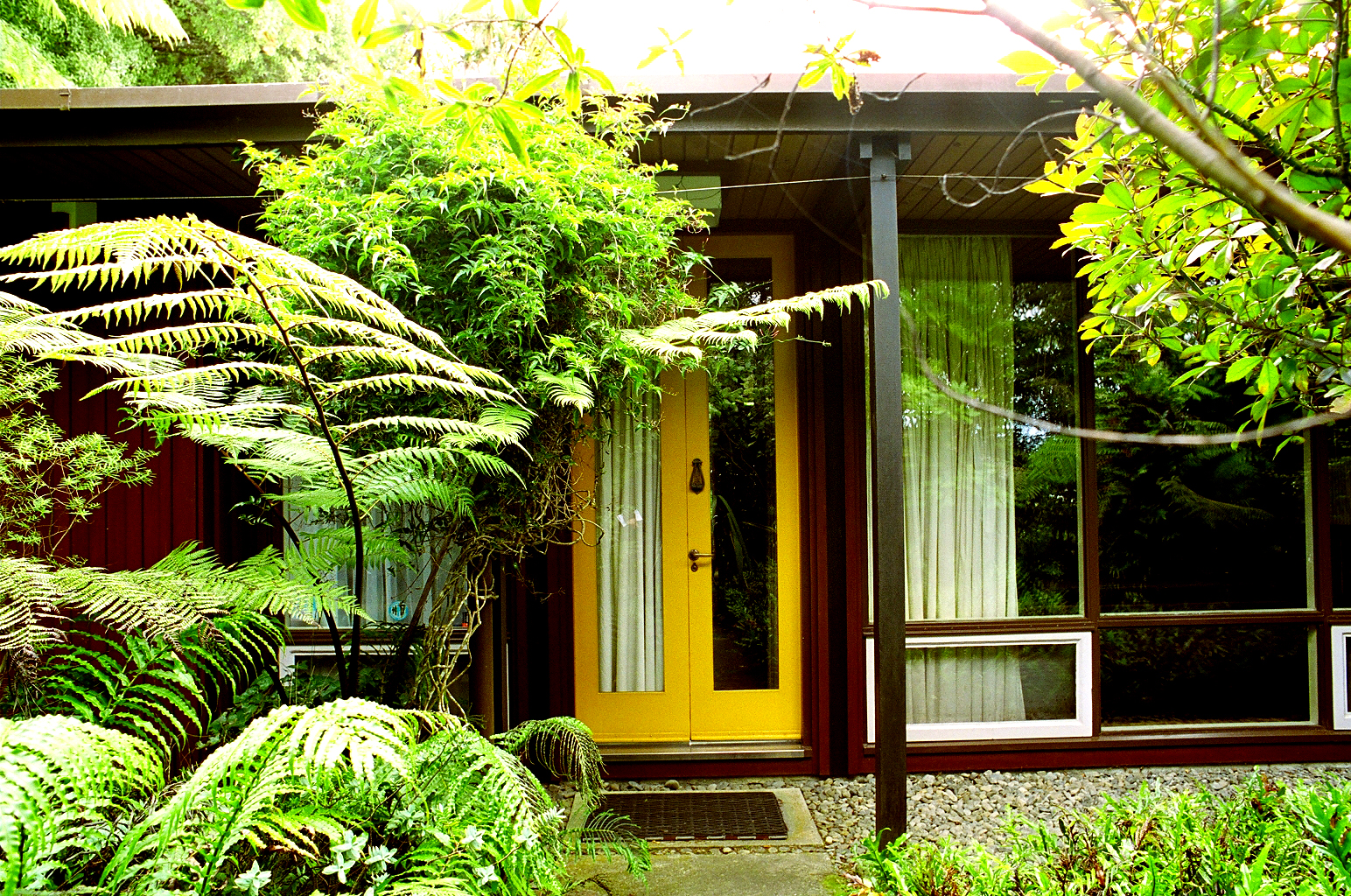
- Interactive map of the Alington House area

General information
- Architectural style: Modernist
- Location: 60-62 Homewood Crescent, Karori, Wellington, New Zealand
- Coordinates: 41.277472°S 174.744501°E
- Completed: 1962

Design and construction
- Architect: Bill Alington

Heritage New Zealand – Category 1
- Designated: 22 June 2007
- Reference no.: 7698

Alington House is a private house in Karori, Wellington, New Zealand. It is "an important New Zealand example of Modern Movement architecture."

The house was designed by Bill Alington for his family while working for the New Zealand Government's Ministry of Works immediately after returning from his overseas experience.

The Alington house was awarded an NZIA Wellington Branch Enduring Architecture award in 2002, and an NZIA (National) Enduring Architecture award in 2007.

The building, is classified as a "Category I" ("places of 'special or outstanding historical or cultural heritage significance or value'") historic place by the New Zealand Historic Places Trust.
