= Ballard, County Clare =

Townland in County Clare, Ireland

Ballard Baile Ard
- Townland
- Location in Ireland
- Coordinates: 52°44′N 9°31′W
- Country: Ireland
- Province: Munster
- County: County Clare

Ballard (Irish: Baile Ard, meaning 'high settlement or place of importance'), also known as Baltard, is a townland in west County Clare, Ireland. It is on the N67 national secondary road between the urban areas of Doonbeg and Kilkee. The nearest large towns are Kilrush and Kilkee, which are approximately 10 and 5 miles away, respectively.

The townland is within the parish of Killard and the diocese of Killaloe.

== Education ==
The current Ballard National School opened in 1911. The old school, set in the lower storey of Flynns' or Cremins' two storey house, still remains.

== Religion ==
There is a legend that St. Senan was brought to Ballard Hill to see the location of Scattery Island, where he went on to establish his main monastery. According to one version of the legend, St. Senan was mysteriously transported on a rock from the hill to the island. During Penal times, secret Catholic masses were held at the western gable end of Ballard House. The now demolished Ballard House (known locally as Father Mc's house) was the location of the parochial House or presbytery for Killard parish (and for a while the joint Killard and Kilkee parishes) until a new parochial house was built in the 1970s in the nearby village of Bealaha.

== History ==
According to the Annals of the Four Masters, there was an earthquake in West Clare almost 1,000 years ago, which split the land between the Cliffs of Moher in the north and Cliffs of Ballard in the south. The subsequent tidal wave engulfed the whole district between these two headlands, and the Atlantic Ocean now rolls over what was once dry land. The earliest evidence of habitation are the various forts located in the townland. The most spectacular of these was a promontory fort located at Donegal Point.

== Historic architecture ==
Ballard Castle was a Napeolonic signal tower built in the 18th century as part of a ring of towers around Ireland. Other towers in Clare were located at Carheenaveelane, Carn Crohane, Mutton Island and Hags Head. Unfortunately, the castle was demolished in the 1960s, and the stones were reused in local farm buildings.

Ballard House was built in the early 19th century as a summer residence for the Singleton family of Quinville Abbey Estate in Quin. The other main landlords were the Blackhall family who lived in the nearby Killard House (also now demolished).

== Geography ==
Ballard is surrounded by the Atlantic Ocean and has some of the most dramatic cliffs on the west coast of Ireland at Donegal Point, the Hubawns and Ballard Bay or Bealnalicka. Donegal Point is a peninsula that is reached by crossing over one of two naturally formed bridges. The shore front at Bealnalicka is noted for its blow hole, which is known locally as the "Puffing Hole". The highest point in Killard Parish is Ballard Hill, where a castle once stood. On a clear day from this point it is possible to see four counties: Clare, Kerry, Limerick, and Galway.

== Tourism ==
The cliffs and coastline of Ballard have been receiving visitors since the Victorian Era, when it was a popular day trip for visitors to make from Kilkee on jaunting cars. The Cliffs of Ballard are recommended in the latest Lonely Planet guide to Ireland.
