= Thomas Keightley =

Irish writer on mythology and folklore (1789–1872)

- Born: Thomas Keightley; 17 October 1789; Dublin, Ireland
- Died: 4 November 1872 (aged 83); Belvedere, London (Lesness Heath, Kent), England
- Resting place: Erith Churchyard
- Occupations: writer, folklorist, mythographer, historian
- Writing career
- Notable work: Fairy Mythology

Thomas Keightley (17 October 1789 – 4 November 1872) was an Irish writer known for his works on mythology and folklore, particularly Fairy Mythology (1828), later reprinted as The World Guide to Gnomes, Fairies, Elves, and Other Little People (1978, 2000, etc.).

Keightley was as an important pioneer in the study of folklore by modern scholars in the field. He was a "comparativist" folklore collector, drawing parallels between tales and traditions across cultures. A circumspect scholar, he did not automatically assume similar tales indicated transmission, allowing for the possibility that similar tales arose independently.

At the request of the educator Thomas Arnold, he authored a series of textbooks on English, Greek, and other histories, which were adopted at Arnold's Rugby School as well as other public schools.

== Life and travels ==
Keightley, born in October 1789, was the son of Thomas Keightley of Newtown, County Kildare, and claimed to be related to Thomas Keightley (1650?–1719). He entered Trinity College Dublin, on 4 July 1803, but left without a degree, and due to poor health he was forced to abandon the pursuit of the legal profession and admission to the Irish Bar.

In 1824 he settled in London, and engaged in literary and journalistic work. Keightley is known to have contributed tales to Thomas Crofton Croker's Fairy Legends of South Ireland (1825), though not properly acknowledged. (Note: Bates, William (1898). The Maclise portrait-gallery of illustrious literary characters. Chatto & Windus. pp. 51 (and 42)., cited in DNB) It turned out that he submitted at least one tale ("The Soul Cages") almost entirely of his own fabrication unbeknown to Croker and others.

Having spent time in Italy, he was capable of producing translations of tales from Pentamerone or The Nights of Straparola in Fairy Mythology, and he struck up a friendship with the patriarch of the Rossetti household. Thomas claimed to be literate in twenty-odd languages and dialects in all, and published a number of translations and digests of medieval and foreign works and passages, often sparsely treated elsewhere in the English language, including the expanded prose versions of Ogier the Dane which conveys the hero to Morgan le Fay's Fairyland, or Swedish ballads on nixes and elves, such as Harpans kraft ("Power of the Harp") and Herr Olof och älvorna ("Sir Olof in Elve-Dance").

== Folklore and mythology ==
Keightley was one of "early and important comparativist collectors" of folklore, and "For an early book of folklore The Fairy Mythology sets high standards".

=== Fairy Mythology ===
In 1828 Keightley published Fairy Mythology, 2 vols., illustrated by W. H. Brooke. A German translation by Wolff Mythologie der feen und elfen (1828) quickly appeared. Jacob Grimm is said to have praised the work. It was popular among Victorian folklore researchers and literary figures in its day; an expanded edition appeared in 1850, and a newly prefaced one in 1860. It has subsequently been reissued intermittently up to modern times, vindicating Keightley's own "high hopes of immortality for his work" in his preface, despite an early biographer calling this "pretentious". (Note: "pretentious preface," Lee in DNB)

Keightley is regarded as an early practitioner in England of the Brothers Grimm's approach to the study of myth and folklore, exploring the parallels between the myth of a nation to the religions and mythology of other regions. Thus Keightley began by attempting to trace fairy myth to Gothic and Teutonic roots, as the Grimms had done for elves. Keightley, like the Grimms, eventually reached the conclusion that it was implausible to trace a myth to an ultimate single source, and that parallel myths can be explained by the "Enlightenment idea that human nature [that] is uniform," and similar experiences and responses are shared across mankind.

==== Conflict over credit ====
Keightley had contributed to T. Crofton Croker's Fairy Legend (1825–1828), and Keightley being stimulated to write his own book was perhaps the most important consequence of Croker's publication. But it was an uneasy situation, as Keightley was clearly peeved at Croker for not properly acknowledging Keightley's aid, even though in the preface to the 1850 edition, Keightley explains the circumstances more cordially, addresses Croker as "one of my earliest literary friends in London".

A selection in Fairy Mythology was an Irish mermaid story entitled "The Soul Cages," which turned out to be a hoax of sorts. The male merrow story was first printed in Croker's anthology, but Keightley came out with a later edition of the Fairy Mythology he added a footnote to this tale, proclaiming he "must here make an honest confession," and informed the reader that except for the kernel of the story adapted from the German story of "The Peasant and the Waterman", this Irish tale was entirely his invention. (Note: Keightley (1850), Fairy Mythology p. 536, continues that, as it turned out, Irishmen in Counties Wicklow and Cork were familiar with such a soul-trapping story, except that "It was things like flower-pots he kept them in.")

==== Publication history ====
The Fairy Mythology underwent several printings (1833, 1850, 1878, etc.) in the 19th century. (Note: It was issued in 1833 with a more long-winded title: The Fairy Mythology: Illustrative of the Romance and Superstition of various Countries.) The 1878 edition was reprinted a century later retitled as The World Guide to Gnomes, Fairies, Elves and Other Little People (New York: Avenel Books, 1978).

=== Mythology of Ancient Greece ===
Keightley's bowdlerized The Mythology of Ancient Greece and Italy for the Use of School (1831) was applauded by Thirlwall for making the subject "fit for ladies." In it, Cronus's use of the adamant sickle (harpē) to emasculate his father has been euphemized as an act of Uranus being "mutilated". (Note: As another example, Keightley's translation of the Italian tale "The Dragon" skips over a sexually charged passage, given in p. 134: "it wasn't necessary to bathe the instrument of death with the same blood with which he had bathed the instrument of life," i.e., the king decided against spilling the maiden's blood with dagger when he has just bloodied his "instrument" by deflowering her.) It has been noted that Keightley took a more historico-scientific, as opposed to theological approach to Greek mythology. (Note: The "scientific" approach espoused by K. O. Müller and C. A. Lobeck, as observed by Robert D. Richardson)

=== Tales and Popular Fictions ===
Keightley's Tales and Popular Fictions; their Resemblances and Transmissions from Country to Country, appeared in 1834. He divided the book into three parts, tales which he believed were transmitted to Europe from the Middle East, tale groups demonstrating striking similarity but which he thought were independently conceived, and those which confounded him.

== Historical works ==
Keightley was long occupied in compiling historical manuals for instructional use and popular enlightenment. His Outlines of History was one of the early volumes of Lardner's Cabinet Cyclopædia (1829). His History of the War of Greek Independence (1830) forms volumes lx. and lxi. of Constable's Miscellany.

After the Outlines, Keightley was urged by the educator Thomas Arnold of Rugby School to undertake work on a series of mid-sized histories to be used in schools. History of England (1837–39), 2 vols., although based on John Lingard, was intended to counteract that writer's Catholic tendencies. Other textbooks followed: History of Greece (1835); Rome (1836); Roman Empire (1840); India in (1846–7). His History of Greece was translated into modern Greek. Keightley also compiled as a study tool Questions on Keightley's History of Greece and Rome (1836), and one on English history (1840) consisted of a long list of history quizzes organized by chapter, for young students of his Roman, Greek, and histories.

Keightley stated he sought to create history material for the schoolroom which were an improvement on Oliver Goldsmith's History, thought himself equal to the task, and found his proof when his titles were "adopt(ed).. immediately on their appearance" by "Eton, Harrow, Rugby, Winchester, and most of the other great public schools, besides a number of private ones." In 1850, Keightley wrote immodestly of his historical output as "yet unrivalled, and may long be unsurpassed." Keightley's History of Rome was derivative of the labors of the German classical historian Barthold Georg Niebuhr, and Keightley's patron or mentor Arnold was a subscriber of Niebuhr's approach.

Samuel Warren, in his Legal Studies, 3rd ed. 1854 (i. 235–6, 349), highly praises his historical work. But he ludicrously overestimated all his performances, and his claim to have written the best history of Rome in any language, or to be the first to justly value Virgil and Sallust, could not be admitted by his friends. During the last years of his life he received a pension from the civil list. He died at Erith, Kent, on 4 Nov 1872.

Besides the works already mentioned Keightley was author of The Crusaders, or Scenes, Events, and Characters from the times of the Crusaders (1834). His Secret Societies of the Middle Ages (Library of Entertaining Knowledge 1837) was initially published anonymously, and against his wish, and later reprinted in 1848.

== Literary criticisms ==
Keightley edited Virgil's Bucolics and Georgics (1847), which was prefigured by his Notes on the Bucolics and Georgics of Virgil with Excursus, terms of Husbandry, and a Flora Virgiliana, (1846). Other Latin classics he edited were Horace, Satires and Epistles (1848), Ovid, Fasti (1848), and Sallust, Catilina and Jugurtha (1849).

=== Milton studies ===
Keightley produced an annotated edition of Milton (2 vols. 1859) as well as his critical biography Account of the Life, Opinions, and Writings of John Milton, with an Introduction to Paradise Lost (1855). His nuggets of insight have been occasionally invoked, compared, and contradicted in studies into the 20th century and beyond. He is listed among the "distinguished file" in one survey of past commentaries on Milton, going back three centuries (Miner, Moeck & Jablonski (2004)). (Note: Miner, Earl Roy; Moeck, William; Jablonski, Steven Edward (2004), Paradise Lost, 1668-1968: Three Centuries of Commentary, Associated University Press, ISBN 0838755771. Keightley is given among the "distinguished" alongside David Masson's edition of 1890, A. W. Verity's editions (1921-29), Merritt Y. Hughes's edition (1957, etc.), and Alastair Fowler, though "[t]hese names do not exhaust the commentators used" in this survey.)

Appreciation of allusions in Milton's poems require familiarity with classical Greco-Roman mythology and epics; to borrow the words of an American contemporary Thomas Bulfinch: "Milton abounds in .. allusions" to classical mythology, and especially "scattered profusely" throughout Milton's Paradise Lost. Keightley was one annotator who meticulously tracked Milton's mythological sources. Some of Keightley's flawed commentary have been pointed out. He argued that Milton erred when he spoke of "Titan, Heaven's first-born," there being no single divine being named Titan, only a race of titans. Though that may be so according to the genealogy laid out by Hesiod's Theogony, it has been pointed out that Milton could well have used alternate sources, such as Lactantius's Divinae Institutiones ("Divine Institutes"), which quotes Ennius to the effect that Uranus had two sons, Titan and Saturn.

Likewise regarding Milton's angelology, Keightley had made some correct observations, but he had constrained the source mostly to the Bible, and made mistakes, such as to identify the angel Ithuriel as a coinage.

=== Other commentary ===
Keightley also published an unannotated edition of Shakespeare (6 vols. 1864), followed by a study guide entitled Shakespeare Expositor: an aid to the perfect understanding of Shakespeare's plays (1867).

Keightley is credited with first noticing that Chaucer's Squire's Tale is paralleled by, and hence may have drawn from, the Old French romance, Adenes Le Roi's Cléomadès.

He also wrote of Henry Fielding's peculiarism of using the antiquated "hath" and "doth" ( Fraser's Magazine, 1858), without acknowledging a commentator who made the same observation before him.

== Friends and family ==
Keightley, a friend to Gabriele Rossetti and firm supporter of the latter's views on Dante, became one of a handful of non-Italians who socialized with the family in the childhood days of Dante Gabriel Rossetti and his siblings. Keightley's Fairy Mythology was one of the books Dante Gabriel pored over until the age of ten.

William Michael Rossetti's Memoir notes that Keightley had as "his nephew and adopted son, Mr. Alfred Chaworth Lyster" who became a dear friend. A pen and ink likeness of this nephew by Dante Gabriel Rossetti exists, dated 1855. (Note: Alfred Chaworth Lyster was the father of Dr. Cecil R. C. Lyster.) Writings from the Rossetti family provide some other loose information on Keightley's related kin or on his later private life. A record by William Rossetti of a spiritual séance at Keightley's home at Belvedere on 4 January 1866, amusing in its own right, identifies "two Misses Keightley" in attendance, a kinsman named "William Samuel Keightley" who died in 1856 supposed to have made his spiritual presence in the session. It has also been remarked that by this period, Keightley had become as "stone-deaf" as Seymour Kirkup, a person who was corresponding with Keightley on matters of spiritualism and visions.

== Selected publications ==
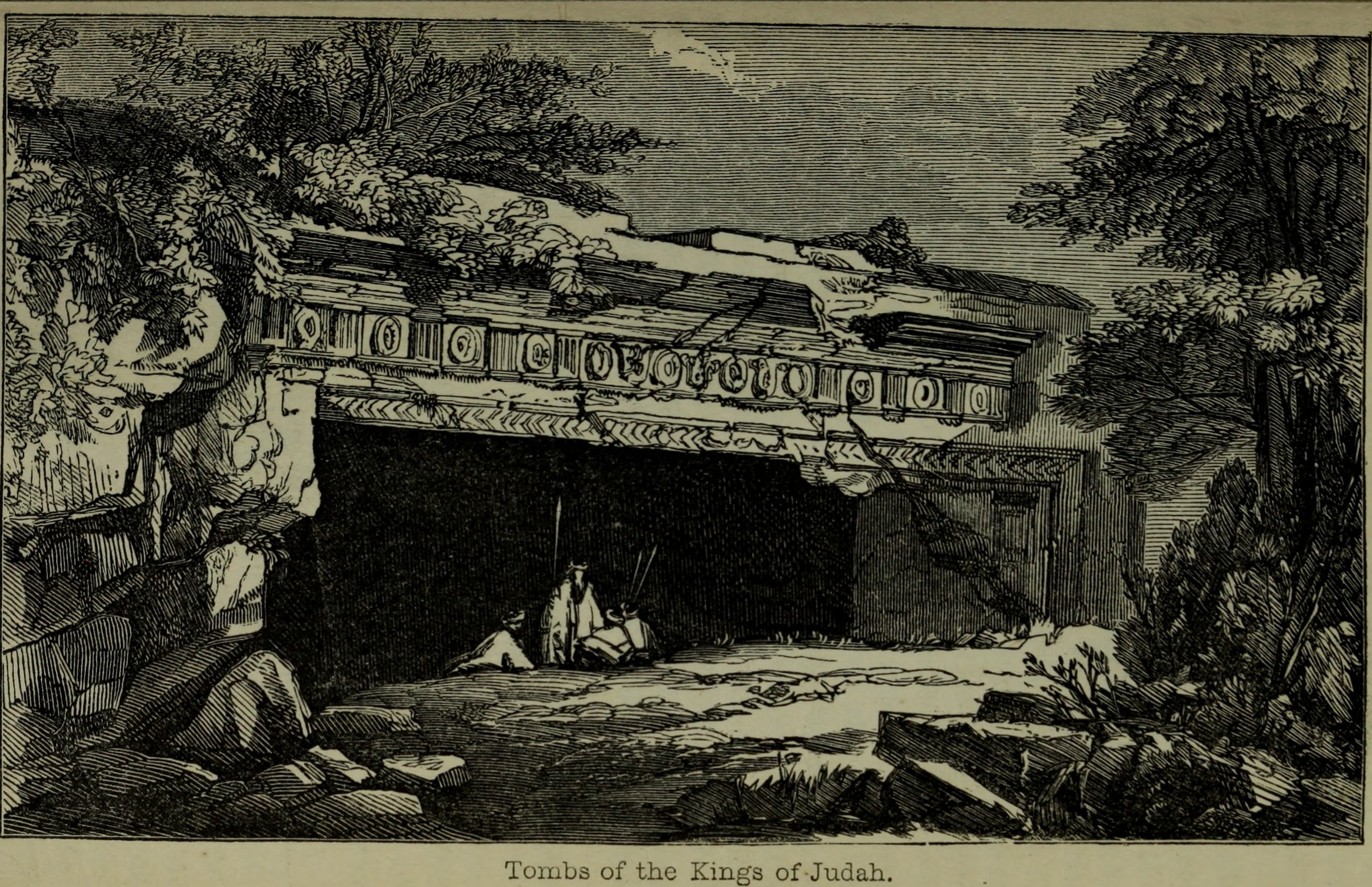
"Tombs of the Kings of Juda", from The Crusaders, or Scenes, Events, and Characters from the times of the Crusaders, 1834

- Keightley, Thomas (1828). The Fairy Mythology. Vol. 1. W. H. Brooke (illustr.). William Harrison Ainsworth. ISBN 9780384290105. & Vol. 2
  - —— (1833) [1828]. The Fairy Mythology: Illustrative of the Romance and Superstition of various Countries. Vol. 1. W. H. Brooke (illustr.). Whittaker, Treacher, and Co. & Vol. 2
  - —— (1850) [1828], The Fairy Mythology: Illustrative of the Romance and Superstition of various Countries (new revised ed.), H. G. Bohn
  - —— (1878) [1828], The Fairy Mythology: Illustrative of the Romance and Superstition of various Countries (New ed., revised and greatly enlarged ed.), George Bell
  - —— (1978) [1878], The Fairy Mythology: Illustrative of the Romance and Superstition of various Countries, New York: Avenel Books, ISBN 9780517263136 (Reprint of 1878 ed.)
- —— (1834), Tales and Popular Fictions: Their Resemblance, and Transmission from Country to Country, Whittaker and Co.
- Anon. (Keightley) (1837), Secret Societies of the Middle Ages, Charles Knight
  - —— (1848).Secret Societies of the Middle Ages: With Illustrations, New edition, C. Cox.
- —— (1834). The Crusaders, or Scenes, Events, and Characters from the times of the Crusaders. 1834.
- —— (1838). The Mythology of Ancient Greece and Italy.
- —— (1845). The History of Greece. Whittaker and Company, London.
- —— (1860). The Manse of Mastland. A translation of Schetsen uit de pastorij te Mastland, the Dutch novel by C. E. Van Koetsveld.

== Explanatory notes ==
=== References ===
Citations

Bibliography

- Dorson, Richard M. (January–March 1955). "Thomas Keightley 1789-1872". The First Group of British Folklorists. Vol. 68. pp. 1–8. doi:10.2307/537105. JSTOR 537105. (originally published paper)
- —— (1999). History of British Folklore. Vol. 1. Taylor & Francis. pp. 52–57. ISBN 0415204763. (reprint)
- Feldman, Burton; Richardson, Robert D. (1972), "Thomas Keightley 1789-1872", The Rise of Modern Mythology, 1680-1860, Indiana University Press, pp. 443–, ISBN 0253201888
- MacCarthy, B. G. (December 1943), "Thomas Crofton Croker 1798-1854", Studies: An Irish Quarterly Review, 32 (128): 539–556, JSTOR 30099490
- Markey, Anne (Winter 2006). "The Discovery of Irish Folklore". New Hibernia Review. 10 (4): 21–43. doi:10.1353/nhr.2006.0069. JSTOR 20558106. S2CID 143629147.
- Silver, Carole G. (1998), "Thomas Keightley 1789-1872", Strange and Secret Peoples : Fairies and Victorian Consciousness, Oxford University Press, pp. 10, 29, 33, 43, 90, ISBN 0198028466
- Lee, Sidney (1892). "Keightley, Thomas (1789-1872)" . In Lee, Sidney (ed.). Dictionary of National Biography. Vol. 30. London: Smith, Elder & Co. "[Extract from Register of Trin. Coll. Dublin, kindly supplied by the Rev. J. W. Stubbs, D.D.; Times, 7 Nov. 1872; Keightley's Fairy Mythology in Bohn's Antiquarian Library, 1850, Preface; Webb's Compendium of Irish Biog. p. 585.]"
- Cousin, John William (1910), "Keightley, Thomas", A Short Biographical Dictionary of English Literature, London: J. M. Dent & Sons – via Wikisource
