= William Alington, 1st Baron Alington =

Irish peer

William Alington
- Baron Alington of Killard
- Tenure: 1642 – 1648
- Born: baptised 14 March 1610 or 14 March 1611
- Died: October 25, 1658 (aged 46–47 or 47–48)
- Spouse: Elizabeth Tollemache
- Issue: Elizabeth Alington; Giles Alington; William Alington; Hildebrand Alington; Catherine Alington; Diana Alington
- Heir: Giles Alington
- Parents: Giles Alington

William Alington, 1st Baron Alington of Killard (baptised 14 March 1610/1611 – buried 25 October 1648) was an Irish peer, the son of Sir Giles Alington. He was created 1st Baron Alington of Killard, on 28 July 1642.

== Biography ==
He married Elizabeth Tollemache, daughter of Sir Lionel Tollemache, 2nd Baronet and Elizabeth Stanhope, before 1 October 1631. They had at least 6 children:

- Elizabeth Alington (1632-1691), who married firstly Charles Seymour, 2nd Baron Seymour of Trowbridge, and secondly Sir John Ernle, a Chancellor of the Exchequer; there were children from her first marriage
- Giles Alington, 2nd Baron Alington of Killard (1640s-1660), who died before coming of age
- William Alington, 3rd Baron Alington of Killard (bef. 1641–1685), who married, firstly, Lady Catherine Stanhope; secondly, Hon. Juliana Noel, by whom he had children; and thirdly, Lady Diana Russel, by whom he had children
- Hildebrand Alington, 5th Baron Alington of Killard (1641–1722/23), who died unmarried
- Catherine Alington, who married Sir John Jacob, 2nd Baronet, and had one child
- Diana Alington, who died unmarried.

After his death, his widow, Lady Alington, remarried Sir William Compton, who died in 1663. She died in 1671.

Peerage of Ireland
New creation	Baron Alington of Killard; 1642–1648	Succeeded by Giles Alington
