= Argentine Alington =

British Vice-Admiral

Vice-Admiral Argentine Hugh Alington (10 July 1876 – 25 March 1945) was an officer of the Royal Navy.

== Personal life ==
Alington married Janet, who died 28 September 1935. A memorial to her and their daughter, Nancy, can be found in Bainton parish church. Alington died on the 25 of March, 1945 at the age of 68 in Stamford, Lincolnshire.

He has also witnessed the Scuttling of the German fleet at Scapa Flow.
