= Bill Alington =

New Zealand architect (1929–2024)

- Born: William Hildebrand Alington; 18 November 1929; Lower Hutt, New Zealand
- Died: 24 February 2024 (aged 94); Wellington, New Zealand
- Education: Auckland University College; University of Illinois
- Occupation: Architect
- Spouse: Margaret Hilda Broadhead (m. 1955; died 2012)
- Buildings: Alington House; Wellington Meteorological Office; Upper Hutt Civic Centre; Wellington High School

William Hildebrand Alington (18 November 1929 – 24 February 2024) was a New Zealand modernist architect, whose work was awarded nationally, and recognised internationally. He was the husband of New Zealand historian Margaret Alington.

== Biographic details and major works ==
=== Education and early years ===
William Hildebrand Alington was born in Lower Hutt on 18 November 1929. He attended Waiwhetu School, and later Hutt Valley High School, where he was taught by James Coe.

Alington began his career as an architectural cadet in the New Zealand Ministry of Works (MoW) in 1949, before studying architecture at the Auckland University College School of Architecture (Auckland, New Zealand) from 1951 to 1955. Early influences of this time include Gordon Wilson, who was the Government Architect at the time, MoW cadet supervisor James (Jim) Beard, who was to become something of a mentor to Alington during the early part of his career, and Professor Richard Toy of Auckland University College School of Architecture. Upon returning to the MoW after his graduation, Alington was assigned to the Hydro-Electricity department where he worked for a short, but influential, time under Chris Valenduuk. Here Alington was responsible for designing the Bulls Water Tower (1956), and the Power House and Control Building for the Waipapa Dam (1956).

In 1955, Alington married Margaret Hilda Broadhead, and they went on to have three children.

In 1956 Alington left New Zealand, travelling to London, Europe; and on a Fulbright Travelling Scholarship, to Illinois in the United States. During 1956-1957 he worked in the London office of Robert Matthew and Johnson-Marshall on, among other projects, New Zealand House (London, England), and Ruddington Secondary Modern School (Nottingham, England). During this time he and his wife Margaret embarked on a tour of western Europe, fulfilling his desire to see firsthand the large medieval cathedrals, as well as key works of Modernist architecture including Le Corbusier's Ronchamp Chapel and Unité d'Habitation in Marseille.

From 1957 to 1959, Alington completed a MArch degree at the University of Illinois' School of Architecture at Urbana, in the United States, during which time he had occasion to meet with Mies van der Rohe. While in the United States Alington took the opportunity to visit buildings by Frank Lloyd Wright and Mies van der Rohe.

=== The Ministry of Works years ===
On his return to New Zealand Alington resumed work as an architect with the MoW, with notable buildings of this time including the Gisborne Courthouse (Gisborne, 1962), and the Meteorological Office (Wellington, 1965).

Alington also designed his own house (Alington House, Wellington, 1962); an important building in his oeuvre, revealing the strong influences of both Mies van der Rohe, and Alington's former cadet supervisor at the MoW, James Albert Beard. The Alington house was awarded an NZIA Wellington Branch Enduring Architecture award in 2002, and an NZIA (National) Enduring Architecture award in 2007. It was also listed as a Category 1 Protected Building on the New Zealand Historic Places Trust register in 2007.

=== Private practice(s) ===
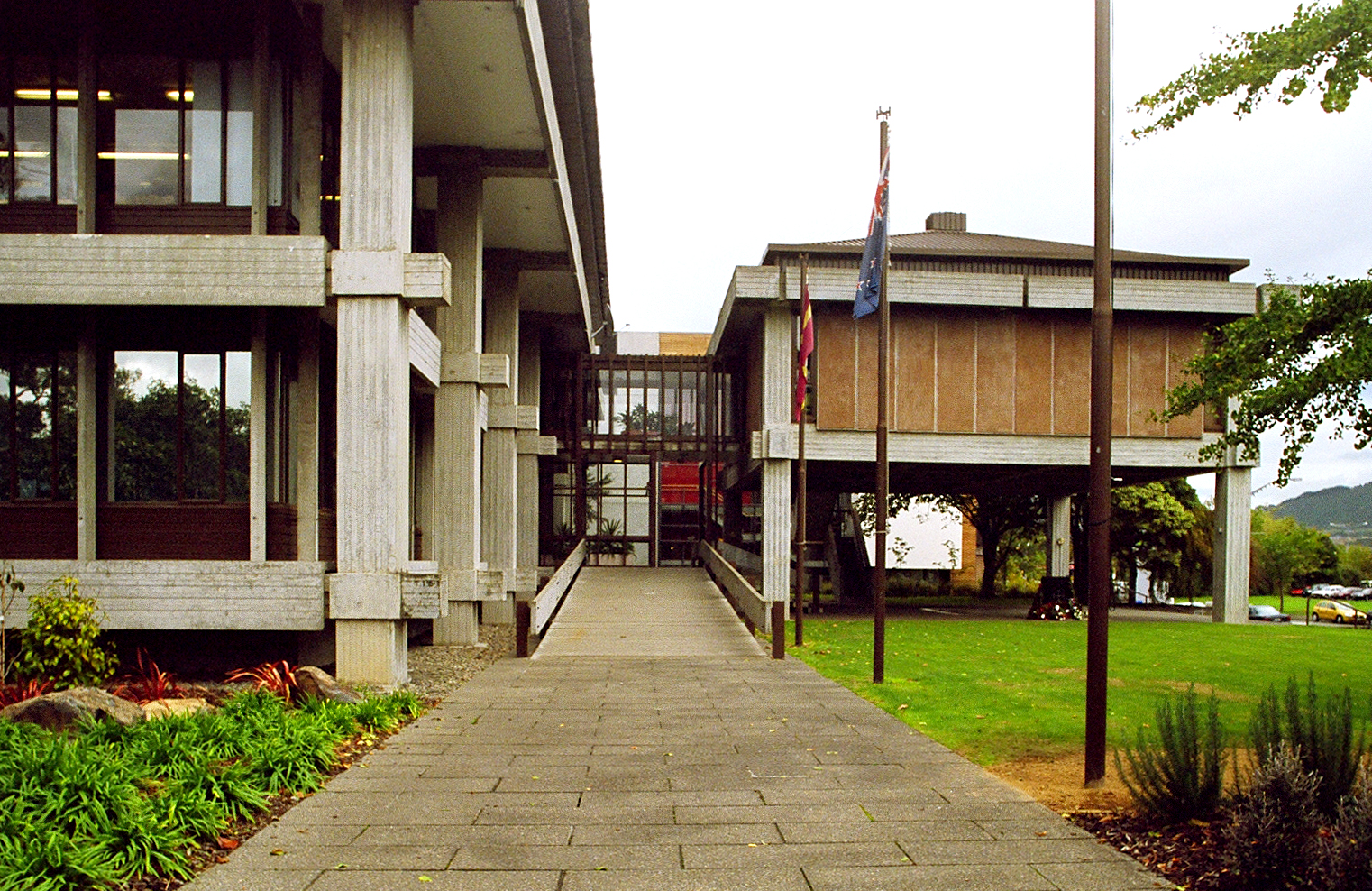
Upper Hutt Civic Centre; Administration building (left) and Council Chambers (right). (photograph by Michael Dudding)

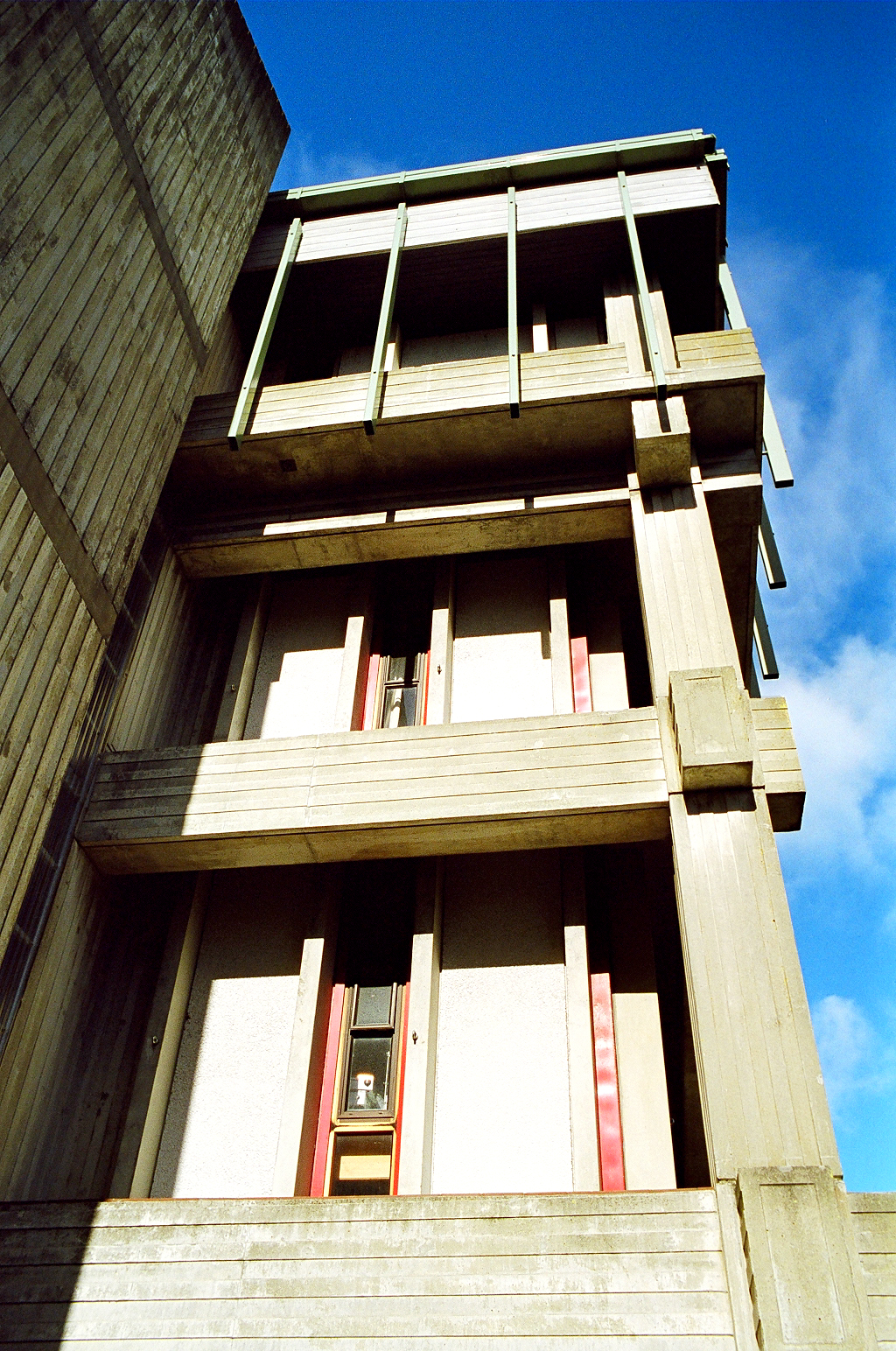
Wellington High School (photograph by Michael Dudding)

In 1965, Alington moved into private practice, accepting a partnership offered by Allot Gabites and James Beard in their architectural practice of Gabites and Beard. This partnership merged with Toomath and Wilson in 1971, becoming Gabites Toomath Beard Wilson and Partners. Although this 'super-practice' was to win the only two NZIA national medals awarded in 1972 (Alington for the Upper Hutt Civic Centre, and Toomath for the Karori Teachers' College), the firm proved to be short-lived, and in that same year splintered under the weight of too many personalities. William Toomath and Derek Wilson took on new partners, becoming Toomath Wilson Irvine Anderson (TWIA), while Beard formed his own practice under the name of James Beard & Co. Alington remained with Al Gabites, and together with Derrick Edmondson formed Gabites Alington Edmonson. In 1978, George Porter joined the practice as a partner, prompting yet another name change to Gabites Porter and Partners. In 1983, Alington set up his own architectural practice: Alington Group Architects. He retired from professional practice in 2000.

Much of Alington's work during the 1970s took the form of institutional projects including work for civic councils, and educational institutions such as schools and universities. Some examples of these are:

- VUW School of Music Kelburn, Wellington 1984
- NZ Chancery New Delhi (unbuilt project) 1984
- Boulevard Hotel (unrealised project) 1984
- Dunedin City Council Administration Building (competition entry) 1979
- Waipa County Offices Te Awamutu 1977
- Wellington High School Wellington, 1973
- NZ Chancery New Delhi (unbuilt project) 1973
- Upper Hutt Civic Centre Upper Hutt 1972
- Helen Lowry Halls of Residence Karori, Wellington, 1972
- Massey University Halls of Residence Palmerston North, 1970

Alington also carried out a large number of church projects, including: Stokes Valley Methodist Church (Stokes Valley, 1966), St Michael's Anglican Church Extension (Wellington, 1971), St Peter's Anglican Church Alterations (Wellington, 1978), St Mary's Anglican Church Extension 1988 (New Plymouth), Karori Baptist Church (Wellington, 1990), St Mary's Anglican Church Extension (Wellington, 1993). He was a Wellington Anglican Diocesan Synods Person 1972–1990.

In 1972, Alington was appointed honorary lecturer and tutor at Victoria University of Wellington's School of Architecture & Design, lecturing in architectural history. He also taught at the University of Auckland as a visiting lecturer in 1982.

Other professional posts held included: NZIA branch committee executive member (1961–1969), NZIA journal assistant editor (1964–1969), NZIA councillor, vice president, branch chairman (1977–1979), and Architectural Centre president (1970–1972).

Alington died in Wellington on 24 February 2024, at the age of 94.

== Honours and awards ==
- NZIA (New Zealand Institute of Architects) - Resene Enduring Award for Architecture, 2007 (for Alington House, Wellington)
- NZIA Resene Local Award for Architecture, 2001 (for Alington House, Wellington)
- NZIA National Award – 1972 National Design Award, 11 May 1977 (for the Waipa County Council Administration building and Council Chamber at Te Awamutu)
- NZIA Branch Award, 22 February 1977 (for the Waipa County Council Office at Te Awamutu)
- NZIA Branch Award – 1975 Design Award, February 1976 (for Ministry of Transport Bulk Store, Kilbirnie, Wellington)
- NZIA Branch Award – 1974 Design Award, February 1975 (for the Massey University Halls of Residence, B C & D, Palmerston North)
- NZIA National Design Award Silver Medal, May 1972 (for Upper Hutt Civic Centre Council Chambers and Civic Hall, Upper Hutt)
- NZIA Branch Award – 1971 Design Award, February 1972 (for the Upper Hutt Civic Centre Council Chambers and Civic Hall, Upper Hutt)
- NZIA Wellington Branch Award, 1972 (for Helen Lowry Halls of Residence, Wellington)

In 2020, Alington was named as a Distinguished Fellow of the New Zealand Institute of Architects. His citation said that his career "is marked by a deep and abiding commitment to the social role of architecture", that his projects were "invested with a sensitive humanism", that his teaching of architectural history and in the design studio at Victoria University of Wellington has "inspired generations of students", and that he "has given exemplary service to his profession and to New Zealand architecture".
