= Baron Alington =

Extinct barony in the Peerage of England

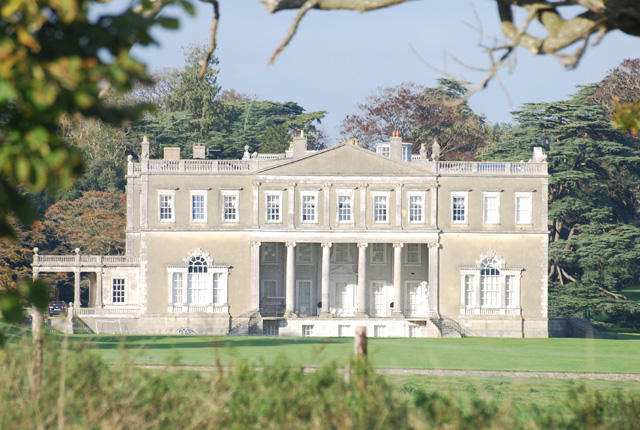
Crichel House, the seat of the Sturt family.

Baron Alington was a title that was created three times in British history. The first creation came in the Peerage of Ireland on 28 July 1642 when William Alington was made Baron Alington, of Killard in the County of Cork. His second son, the third Baron (who succeeded in the title on the early death of his elder brother), was a Major-General in the English Army. On 5 December 1682 he was created Baron Alington, of Wymondley in the County of Hertford, in the Peerage of England. The English barony became extinct on the death of his young son Giles, the fourth baron, in 1691. The late Baron was succeeded in the Irish barony by his uncle, the fifth baron. He was a captain in the army. On his death, in February 1723, the Irish barony became extinct as well.

The title was revived on 15 January 1876 when the peer and Conservative politician Henry Sturt was made Baron Alington, of Crichel in the County of Dorset, in the Peerage of the United Kingdom. He was the son of Henry Sturt, great-grandson of Humphrey Sturt by his wife Diana (through which marriage Crichel House in Dorset came into the Sturt family), daughter of Sir Nathaniel Napier, 3rd Baronet, and Catherine, daughter of the third Baron of the 1642 creation. Lord Alington was succeeded by his son, the second Baron. He represented Dorset East in Parliament. His eldest son, Captain Gerard Philip Montagu Napier Sturt (1893–1918), died on Armistice Day 1918, from wounds received in action, unmarried. Lord Alington was therefore succeeded by his second son, the third Baron. He was a Group Captain in the Royal Air Force. He had no sons and on his death on active service in 1940, the title became extinct. The family seat of Crichel House passed to the late Baron's daughter, Mary Anna Sibell Elizabeth Sturt (1929–2010).

== Barons Alington; First and second creations (1642/1682) ==
- William Alington, 1st Baron Alington (died 1648)
- Giles Alington, 2nd Baron Alington (died 1659)
- William Alington, 3rd Baron Alington, 1st Baron Alington (died 1685) (created Baron Alington in the Peerage of England in 1682)
- Giles Alington, 4th Baron Alington, 2nd Baron Alington (1680–1691)
- Hildebrand Alington, 5th Baron Alington of Killard (1641–1723)

== Barons Alington; Third creation (1876) ==
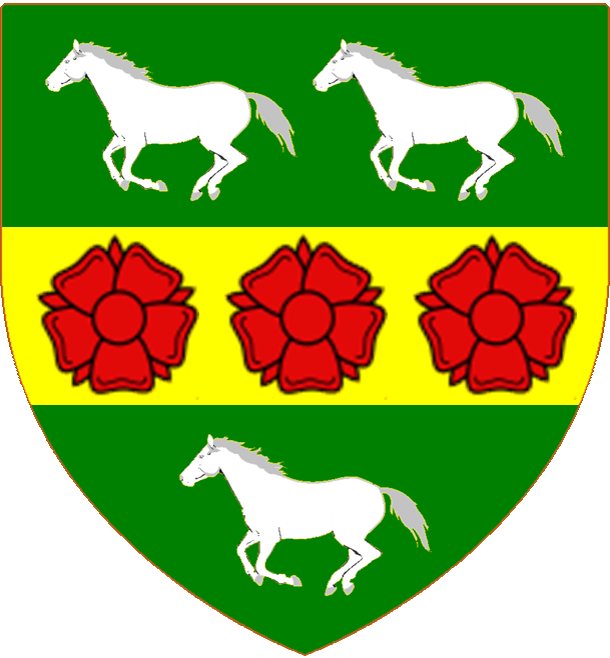
Arms used by barons of the third creation

- Henry Gerard Sturt, 1st Baron Alington (1825–1904)
- Humphrey Napier Sturt, 2nd Baron Alington (1859–1919)
- Napier George Henry Sturt, 3rd Baron Alington (1896–1940)
