= William Alington, 3rd Baron Alington =

Irish peer

William Alington
- Baron Alington of Killard
- Tenure: 1659–1685
- Predecessor: Giles Alington, 2nd Baron Alington
- Successor: Giles Alington, 4th Baron Alington
- Other titles: Constable of the Tower; Lord Lieutenant of the Tower Hamlets; Baron Alington of Wymondley
- Born: before 1641
- Died: 1 February 1685
- Spouses: Catherine Stanhope; Diana Russell
- Issue: Catherine Alington; Giles Alington, 4th Baron Alington
- Parents: William Alington, 1st Baron Alington; Elizabeth Tollemache

Major General William Alington, 3rd Baron Alington LL (bef. 1641 – 1 February 1685) was an Irish peer.

Alington was the son of William Alington, 1st Baron Alington and Elizabeth Tollemache. He succeeded to the title of 3rd Baron Alington of Killard, County Cork circa March 1660, on the death of his brother the 2nd Baron who died without male issue.

In 1664, he was elected Member of Parliament for Cambridge in a by-election to the Cavalier Parliament and was re-elected for the same constituency in 1679 and 1681. He was created 1st Baron Alington of Wymondley, Hertfordshire on 5 December 1682.

He served as Constable of the Tower from 1679 to his death and as Lord-Lieutenant of Cambridgeshire from 1681 to his death.

== Private life ==
He died in 1685, having married three times.

Alington married (1) Catherine Stanhope, daughter of Henry Stanhope, Lord Stanhope, and his wife, Katherine, before 1662.

He married (2) Hon. Juliana Noel, daughter of Baptist Noel, 3rd Viscount Campden, on 30 July 1664.

He married (3) Lady Diana Russell, daughter of William Russell, 1st Duke of Bedford, on 15 July 1675. They had two children.

- Hon. Catherine Alington, who married, in 1694, Sir Nathaniel Napier, 3rd Baronet
- Giles Alington, 4th Baron Alington

Honorary titles
Preceded by The Earl of Northampton	Constable of the Tower; Lord Lieutenant of the Tower Hamlets; 1681–1685	Succeeded by The Lord Dartmouth
Preceded by The Earl of Suffolk	Lord Lieutenant of Cambridgeshire; 1681–1685	Succeeded by The Earl of Ailesbury
Peerage of England
New title	Baron Alington of Wymondley; 1682–1684/85	Succeeded by Giles Alington
Peerage of Ireland
Preceded by Giles Alington	Baron Alington of Killard; 1659/60–1684/85	Succeeded by Giles Alington
