= Doonbeg (Killard) =

Parish in County Clare, Ireland

- Parish
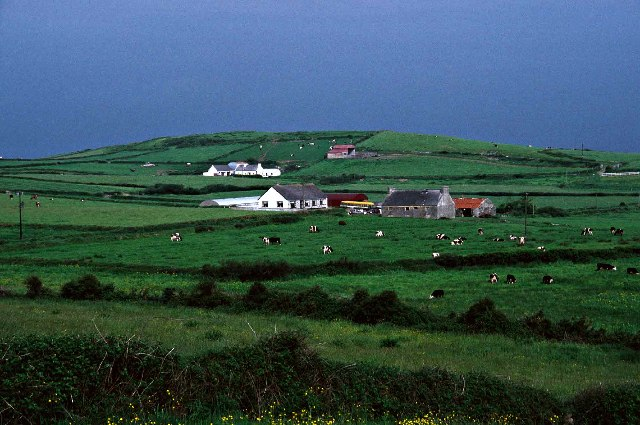
- Hillside in the parish

- Location in Ireland
- Coordinates: 52.731302°N 9.523437°W
- Country: Ireland
- Province: Munster
- County: County Clare
- Website: www.doonbeginfo.com/index.html

Doonbeg (Killard) (Irish: Cill Ard) is a civil parish on the Atlantic coast of County Clare in Ireland. It is also an ecclesiastical parish in the Roman Catholic Diocese of Killaloe. The largest population centre in the parish is the village of Doonbeg.

== Location ==
The parish is part of the historic barony of Ibrickane. The name "Killard" means "church on the hill". The parish is 5 miles (8.0 km) northeast of Kilkee on the coast of Ibrickane. It contains the village of Doonbeg, and is crossed by the road from Kilkee to Ennistymon. The parish of Kilmacduane lies to the east.

== Antiquities ==
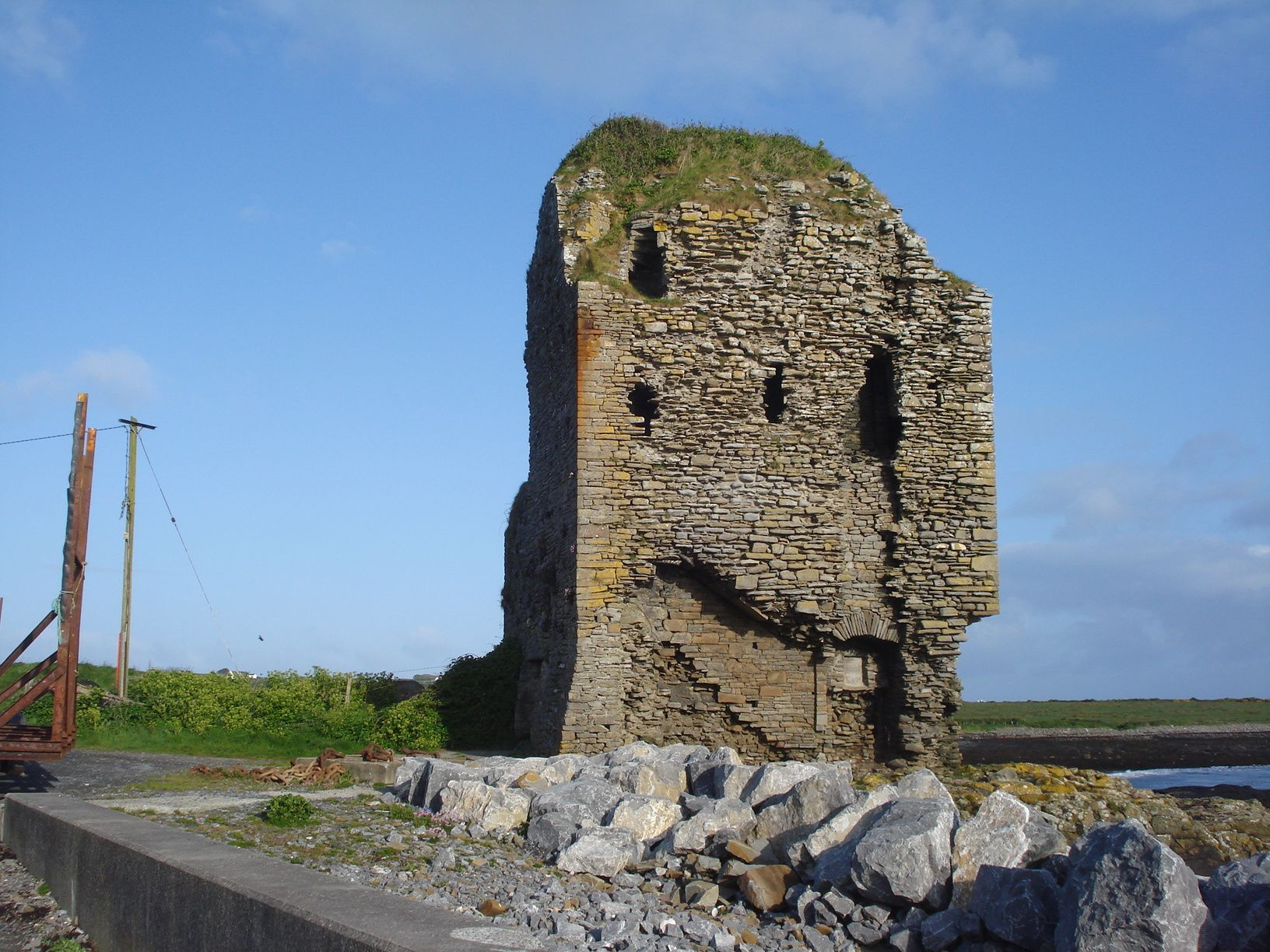
Doonmore Castle

In 1837 there were the ruins of a signal tower on the summit of Baltard cliff, and the ruins of Dunmore castle on the south-western side of Dunbeg bay. The castles of Doonmore and Doonbeg are within 1 mile (1.6 km) of each other. In 1580 they belonged to Sir Daniel O’Brien of Dough. The old church was in ruins but the old church graveyard was still being used in 1897. There is a holy well beside it called Tobar-Cruithnoir-an-domhain (the well of the Creator of the world). There was another graveyard of Saint Senán, called Kiltenain, in the parish. There is a small place of sepulture called Cill-na-clochán in the townland of Cloonmore, and a holy well dedicated to Saint Brendan in the townland of Cloonagarnaun.

== Geography ==
It is 8 by 2 miles (12.9 by 3.2 km) and covers 17,022 acres (6,889 ha). The coast extends from Lough Donnel in the north to Farrihy bay in the south, and includes Doonbeg bay, Carronmore Point, Donegal Point, and Baltard or Ballard Point.

Beaches include the White Strand, Doughbheg Beach, Doughmore Beach and Clogher Strand. The White Strand, sheltered from the prevailing winds, is safe for swimming and monitored by lifeguards in the summer. Doughbheg Beach is also safe for swimming, but Doughmore is not, although the 2.5 kilometres (1.6 mi) sandy beach is used for surfing. Clogher Strand, with sand and stones, separates Lough Donnell from the sea. The Hubáns, Baltard Cliffs, the Horseshoe and Donegal Point are nearby cliffs. Baltard Cliffs has views, on a clear day, of counties Clare, Galway, North Kerry and West Limerick.

== Townlands ==
Townlands are: Ballard, Caherlean, Carrowblough Beg, Carrowblough More, Carrowmore, Carrowmore North, Carrowmore South, Cloonmore, Cloonnagarnaun, Doonbeg, Doonmore, Einagh, Glascloon, Killard, Lisgurreen, Lismuse, Mountrivers, Sragh and Tullaher.

== Facilities ==
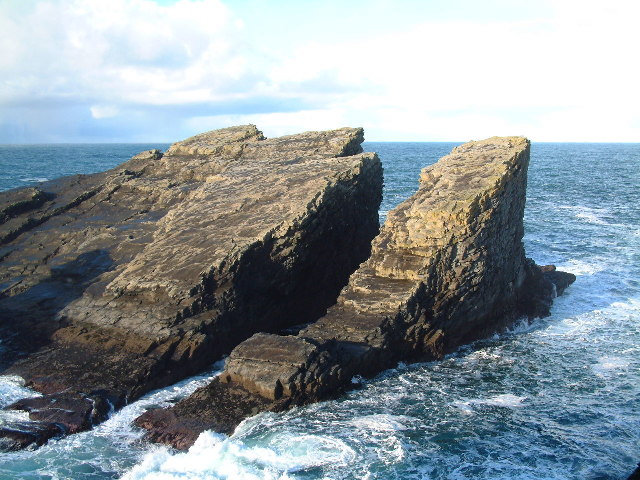
Rocks at Pulley Bay, north of Baltard

There are several golf courses in the vicinity. The 18-hole Doonbeg Golf Club, now rebranded and owned by Donald Trump, was designed by Greg Norman, twice winner of the British Open, and extends along 1.5 miles (2.4 km) of beach and dunes. Kilkee is an 18-hole course. Other courses are Lahinch, Kilrush and the 9-hole Spanish Point. Other visitor attractions include walking trails, surfing, scuba diving, sailing, fishing and dolphin watching.

== Catholic parish ==
The civil parishes of Kilferagh and Killard were combined into one Catholic parish by the late 17th century. In 1841 the population of the civil parish of Killard was 6,941 in 1,094 houses. Of these, 316 lived in 52 houses in the village. In 1854 the Catholic parish was again separated into roughly the same two areas as the medieval parishes, forming the modern Kilkee (Kilfearagh) and Doonbeg (Killard) parishes.

There are two churches in the parish: "Our Lady Assumed into Heaven" (Doonbeg) and "St Senan's" (Bealaha). "Our Lady Assumed into Heaven" is a modern building, noteworthy for the stained-glass windows that are uniquely designed so that the various colours illuminate the altar throughout the day. The church was built in 1976 and has an uncommon octagonal shape. It replaced the older crucifix-shaped church that was built in 1813. The bell from the old church was transferred to the new building. It bears the inscription Me Vocante, Deum Laudate ("At my call, praise God").
