= Weldon (surname) =

Weldon is a surname, and may refer to:

== A ==
- Alex Weldon (1914–2004) was an American visual effects artist
- Andrew Weldon, Australian cartoonist
- Anthony Weldon (1583–1648), English courtier and politician

== B ==
- Bodie Weldon (1895–1928), American football player

== C ==
- Charles Wesley Weldon (1830–1896), Canadian lawyer and politician
- Caroline Weldon (1844–1921), Swiss-American artist and activist
- Casey Weldon (born 1969), American football player
- Casey Weldon (artist), American artist
- Casey Bill Weldon (1901/1909–1972), American blues musician
- Charles Weldon (1940–2018), American actor and director
- Christopher Joseph Weldon (1905–1982), American Roman Catholic bishop
- Constance Weldon (1932–2020), American tuba player
- Curt Weldon (born 1947), American Congressman

== D ==
- Dave Weldon (born 1953), American Congressman
- Duncan Weldon (journalist) (born 1982), British journalist
- Duncan Weldon (producer) (1941–2019), British theatre producer

== E ==
- Edward Weldon (1936–2022), American archivist and government administrator

== F ==
- Fay Weldon (1931–2023), British writer
- Felix de Weldon (1907–2003), American sculptor
- Florence Weldon (1858–1936), English mathematician
- Francis Weldon (1913–1993), British equestrian and Olympic champion
- Frank Weldon (c. 1900–1970), American songwriter

== G ==
- George Weldon (1908–1963), English conductor
- George Weldon (Deputy Governor of Bombay) (died 1697), English merchant and Deputy Governor of Bombay
- George and Thomas Weldon, duo, builders in Mississippi
- Georgina Weldon (1837–1914), British campaigner against the lunacy laws
- Glen Weldon, American writer and podcaster

== H ==
- Harry Weldon (comedian) (1881–1930), English comedian and music hall performer

== J ==
- Jerry Weldon (born 1957), American tenor saxophonist
- Jimmy Weldon (1923–2023), American voice actor and television host
- Jo Weldon (born 1962), American performer
- Joe Weldon (1922–2007), Australian rules footballer
- Joan Weldon (1930–2021), American actress and singer
- John Weldon (animator) (born 1945), Canadian animator
- John Weldon (musician) (1676–1736), British musician
- John Wesley Weldon (died 1885), lawyer, judge and political figure in the province of New Brunswick, Canada

== K ==
- Kevin Weldon (1933–2023), Australian book publisher and philanthropist

== L ==
- Larry Weldon (1915–1990), American football quarterback
- Lawrence Weldon (1829–1905), American politician and judge
- Liam Weldon (1933–1995), Irish folk singer and songwriter
- L. D. Weldon (1908–1989), American track and field coach

== M ==
- Marcus Weldon (born 1968), President of Bell Labs
- Mark Weldon (born 1967), New Zealand CEO and swimmer
- Maxine Weldon, American soul and jazz singer
- Michael Weldon (born 1945), Australian politician
- Michael Weldon (cricketer) (born 1997), South African cricketer
- Michele Weldon (born 1958), American journalism academic

== O ==
- Othmar Weldon (1920–2008), Australian Marist brother

== P ==
- Paul Weldon, Canadian graphic designer and architect

== R ==
- Ralph Weldon (died 1676), English politician
- Ralph Weldon (Benedictine) (1674–1713), English Benedictine monk and chronicler
- Raphael Weldon (1860–1906), British statistician
- Richard B. Weldon Jr. (born 1958), American politician
- Richard Chapman Weldon (1849–1925), Canadian law professor
- Richard L. Weldon (1932–2020), Canadian politician
- Robbi Weldon (born 1975), Canadian paralympic Nordic skier and para-cyclist
- Ryan Weldon, American politician

== S ==
- S. Laurel Weldon, Canadian and American political scientist
- Stewart Weldon (born 1977), American serial killer
- Susanna Haliburton Weldon (1817–1899), Canadian artist and ceramics collector

== T ==
- Thomas Weldon (politician) (died 1567), English politician and courtier
- Thomas Dewar Weldon (1896–1958), British philosopher
- Thomas King Weldon (1826–1894), New Zealand police officer
- Tony Weldon (1900–1953), Scottish footballer
- Tracey Weldon, American linguist

== V ==
- Vince Weldon, American aerospace engineer
- Virginia V. Weldon (1935–2024), Canadian-American endocrinologist

== W ==
- Walter Weldon (1832–1885), British chemist, developer of the Weldon process in chlorine manufacture
- William Weldon (officer of arms) (1837–1919), British officer at arms
- William C. Weldon (born 1948), American businessman, CEO of Johnson & Johnson

== Y ==
- Yvonne Weldon, Australian local government politician

== See also ==
- Welldon
- Wheldon
- Welton (surname)
