= Weldon =

Weldon may refer to:

== Places ==
In Canada:

- Weldon, Saskatchewan

In England:

- Weldon, Northamptonshire

In the United States:

- Weldon, Arkansas
- Weldon, California
- Weldon, Illinois
- Weldon, Iowa
- Weldon, Michigan
- Weldon, North Carolina
- Weldon Township, Michigan
- Weldon, Texas
- Weldon Spring, a city in Missouri

== People ==
People named Weldon, Welldon or Wheldon

- Weldon (surname)
- Welldon
- Wheldon
- Weldon (footballer) (born 1980), Brazilian football player
- Weldon L. Kennedy (1938–2020), American special agent, Deputy Director of the FBI
- J. Weldon Jones (1896–1982), American administrator and acting High Commissioner to the Philippines

== Fictional characters ==
- Caroline Weldon, a character in the American sitcom Living Dolls

== Other uses ==
- Weldon’s bark-grinding mill, a type of bark mill
- D. B. Weldon Library at Western University, London, Ontario, Canada
- Weldon Park Academy, also in London

== See also ==
- Welden (surname)
- Welton (disambiguation)
