= Wheldon =

Wheldon is a surname, and may refer to:

- Dan Wheldon (1978–2011), British racing driver who won two Indianapolis 500 races
- David Wheldon (1950–2021), English writer and medical doctor
- Fred Wheldon (1869–1924), English sportsman
- Huw Wheldon (1916–1986), British television presenter and executive
- Jacqueline Wheldon (1924–1993), English author
- Juliet Wheldon (1950–2013), British civil servant
- R. W. Wheldon (1893–1954), British agriculturalist and cattle-breeder
- Rupert H. Wheldon (1883–1960), American photographer and veganism activist
- Sebastian Wheldon (born 2009), American racing driver
- Tim Wheldon (1959–2023), English solicitor
- Wynn Wheldon (1879–1961), Welsh civil servant

== See also ==
- Weldon (surname)
