= Maurice Dean =

English civil servant

Sir Maurice Joseph Dean, KCB, KCMG (16 September 1906 – 7 April 1978) was an English civil servant. Educated at Trinity College, Cambridge, he entered the civil service in 1929 as an official in the Air Ministry, where he remained until 1946 when he moved to the Control Commission for Germany and Austria and the German Section of the Foreign Office; two years later, he moved to the Ministry of Defence; he subsequently moved to HM Treasury (1952) and then worked as a Second Secretary in the Board of Trade (1952–55). Dean was the Permanent Secretary of the Air Ministry from 1955 to 1963; after serving from 1963 to 1964 as a Second Secretary at HM Treasury, was the Joint Permanent Secretary of the Department of Education and Science in 1964 and then Permanent Secretary of the Ministry of Technology from 1964 to 1966. He was a director of the British Printing Corporation from 1966 to 1971. His brother was the mathematician W. R. Dean.

Government offices
Preceded by Sir James Barnes	Permanent Secretary of the Air Ministry; 1955–1963	Succeeded by Sir Martin Flett
Preceded by Sir Herbert Andrew as Permanent Secretary, Ministry of Education	Permanent Secretary of the Department for Education and Science; 1964; With: Sir Herbert Andrew	Succeeded by Sir Herbert Andrew and Sir Bruce Fraser
