= Ben Bowen Thomas =

Welsh civil servant (1899–1977)

Ben Bowen Thomas in 1959

Sir Ben Bowen Thomas (18 May 1899 – 26 July 1977) was a Welsh civil servant and university President. He served as Permanent Secretary to the Welsh Department of the Ministry of Education from 1945 to 1963, and was President of the University of Wales, Aberystwyth from 1964 to 1975. In June 1977 Thomas was awarded an Honorary Degree from the Open University as Doctor of the University.

Thomas was born in 1899 in Ystrad Rhondda, and was educated at Rhondda Grammar School, the University College of Wales, Aberystwyth and Jesus College, Oxford. Influenced by the adult education movement, he spent five years as a university tutorial class lecturer before becoming the first warden of Coleg Harlech when it was founded by Dr Thomas Jones in 1927. He remained there until 1940, when he moved to the Ministry of Labour and then the Ministry of Education. Thomas was President of the London Welsh Trust, which runs the London Welsh Centre, Gray's Inn Road, from 1953 until 1955. He was also involved with the work of Unesco, becoming a member of its executive board and later chairman (1958–1960). During his time at the Ministry of Education, he worked for improved standards in Welsh schools and for Welsh language tuition (he was a fluent Welsh speaker). He retired from the civil service in 1963, becoming president of the University of Wales, Aberystwyth in 1964 and serving until 1975 and President of the Aberystwyth Old Students' Association in 1968–69. He was also chairman of the Baptist Union of Wales (1966–1967). Apart from his knighthood awarded in the 1950 King's Birthday Honours List, he was also awarded an honorary doctorate by the University of Wales and an Honorary Fellowship by Jesus College. He died on 26 July 1977 in Bangor, Gwynedd.

Government offices
Preceded by Sir Wynn Wheldon	Permanent Secretary of the Welsh Department, Ministry of Education; 1945–1963	Succeeded by Elwyn Davies
Academic offices
Preceded by Sir David Hughes Parry	President of the University College of Wales Aberystwyth; 1964–1976	Succeeded by Cledwyn Hughes, Baron Cledwyn of Penrhos
Professional and academic associations
Preceded by Dr William Thomas	President of the Aberystwyth Old Students' Association; 1968–1969	Succeeded by R. M. Cohen
