= David Urie =

Prior to June 2007, David Urie was Vice-President and Program Manager of Rocketplane Limited, Inc., where he managed the design of the Rocketplane XP.

Prior to joining the Rocketplane team, Urie served as president of Concept Fusion, Inc., providing technical development services to established companies and start-up organizations. During his 30-year career with the Lockheed Martin Corporation, Urie led teams on Lockheed’s X-30 National Aerospace Plane and the HL-20 Personnel Launch System. He was Chief Engineer and then Program Manager of the SR-71 Blackbird reconnaissance system before initiating and heading the Single Stage to Orbit (SSTO) and X-33 Reusable Launch Vehicle (RLV) Programs at Lockheed. Urie's work as the program manager for the previously classified Have Region project demonstrated that rocket-powered single-stage-to-orbit vehicles were technically feasible, which led to the Lockheed Martin SSTO design approach.

As a Director of the Lockheed-Martin Skunk Works SSTO/RLV Advanced Technology Demonstration Program, Urie conceived and developed the aerospike rocket propelled lifting body that was selected by NASA as winner of the X-33 competition. He holds the patent on the design(U.S. patent D362234), and he formed and headed a multi-company team encompassing all aspects of SSTO/RLV.

Urie was also Program Manager for the Trans-Atmospheric Vehicle (TAV) at Lockheed. His team built and successfully tested a large-scale cross section Mach 25 structure. He served on several advanced development projects in Flight Sciences and Operations Analysis.

Throughout his distinguished career, Urie has received numerous honors and awards, including the prestigious Engineer of the Year award from the American Institute of Aeronautics and Astronautics. He has published many articles, prepared and taught several short courses, given various lectures and presentations, and served as aerospace engineering curricula advisor to two universities.

== See also ==
- Gene Salvay - colleague of Urie on the TAV at Lockheed
- Vince Weldon - also assisted on the TAV and X-33
