= Wilsons of Epsom =

Automobile supermarket in England

Wilsons Automobiles & Coachworks
- Type: Private company
- Industry: Automotive industry
- Founded: 1904; 122 years ago
- Founder: Howard Wilson
- Headquarters: Epsom, United Kingdom
- Key people: Ian Wilson (Chairman); Theresa Wilson (Director); John Butler (Finance Director)
- Products: New Cars; Used Cars; Car Finance; New Vans; Used Vans; Car Servicing
- Number of employees: 200 (2020)
- Website: www.wilsons.co.uk

Wilsons Epsom is a British car and van franchise dealership and supermarket based in Epsom, Surrey. The company was established in 1904 by Howard Wilson. It is the biggest car supermarket in Surrey, selling new and used cars from brands including Abarth, Alfa Romeo, Dacia, Fiat, Hyundai, Jeep, Nissan, Nismo, MG, Peugeot and Renault.

== History ==
The company started as a driving school in 1904. Originally known as the Wilsons Group, the idea for a driving school came about when Howard Wilson and his wife Florence Wilson purchased a car and taught themselves how to drive. Friends and neighbours grew envious of their new "horseless carriage" that they were driving and asked the Wilsons to teach them. As a result, Howard and Florence started the driving school.

During World War I, the driving school was used to teach Australian and New Zealand troops how to drive army trucks in London. After the war, in the 1920s and 30s there was a growth in demand for cars as the number of car owners increased and the Wilsons decided to sell vehicles by opening their first dealership in Epsom, Surrey at the end of the Second World War.

In 1946, Wilsons had the largest self drive car fleet in the United Kingdom, with most of the Wilsons own children taught to drive as young as five. In the 1950s, Tony Wilson taught children to drive at school as part of a road safety campaign. Wilsons became an authorised dealer of Renault in 1953, one of the first in the United Kingdom.

Over the years, dealerships for Abarth, Alfa Romeo, Dacia, Fiat, Hyundai, Jeep, Nissan, Nismo, Peugeot, MG and Renault have been added and grown successfully. Wilsons started the first global motorhome sales centre in 1958, and became the largest global motorhome dealership throughout the 1960s and 70s trading as Wilsons Caravan Centre.

Over 2,000 motorhomes were sold each year from Brixton and Clapham in London, Epsom in Surrey, Bradford in Yorkshire and Castle Donington in Leicester. Clientele even included celebrities such as Steve McQueen, Graham Hill and Jackie Stewart.

== Products ==
Wilsons sells new and approved used and used cars from other car brands with over 1,000 new and used cars on their Epsom site. The company operates a scheme on Motability, for those that are eligible for the "Higher Rate Component" of the Disability Living Allowance or the War Pensioners Motability Supplement.

Wilsons operates others brands, including Loads of Vans based in Cheam and Bargain Buys, also situated in Epsom. Other automotive services including MOT, renting, servicing and bodyshop repairs are provided by the company. Wilsons employs more than two hundred people, and sells around 9,500 cars a year. The company is still managed by the fourth generation of the Wilson family.
