= Welden (surname) =

Welden is an English language surname, a variant of Weldon. Notable people with the name include:

- Ben Welden (1901–1997), American character actor
- Louis Welden Hawkins (1849–1910), English symbolist painter
- Oliver Welden (1946–2021), Chilean poet
- Paula Jean Welden (1928–1946), American college student who disappeared while walking on Vermont's Long Trail hiking route
- Thomas King Weldon (1826–1894), New Zealand police officer
