= Elwyn Davies =

Welsh author (1908–1986)

Elwyn Davies (20 September 1908 – 18 September 1986) was a Welsh university and cultural administrator, civil servant, writer and academic.

Born on 20 September 1908, Davies was the son of Congregationalist minister, Ben Davies (1878–1956). His brother, Alun Davies, became a professor of history at Swansea University. Elwyn attended the University College of Wales, Aberystwyth, and the University of Manchester, completing a PhD at the latter in 1937.

Davies was appointed a lecturer at Manchester in 1934, serving under H. J. Fleure. He worked in naval intelligence for four years during the Second World War, after which, in 1945, he was appointed secretary to the council of the University of Wales, serving until 1963. He was also secretary to the board of the University of Wales Press. In 1963, he was appointed Permanent Secretary of the Welsh Department of the Ministry of Education; the next year, he took on the equivalent role in the newly formed Department of Education and Science. After retiring in 1969, he was chairman of the Welsh Library Council and president of the National Library of Wales, from 1977 to 1986. He died on 18 September 1986. An obituary in The Times noted that he had, "unaccountably", not received any state honours for his work, but he received an honorary doctorate from Manchester. He was also a writer, producing works on transhumance and Welsh place names and rural communities.

Government offices
Preceded by Sir Ben Bowen Thomas	Permanent Secretary of the Welsh Department, Ministry of Education; 1963–1964	Succeeded by himself as Permanent Secretary, Welsh Department, Department of Education and Science
Preceded by himself as Permanent Secretary, Welsh Department, Board of Education	Secretary for Welsh Education, Department of Education and Science; 1964–1969	Succeeded by Leslie Jones as Secretary for Welsh Education, Welsh Office and Department of Education and Science
