= Thomas Weldon =

Thomas Weldon may refer to:

- Thomas Weldon (politician) (died 1567), English politician and courtier
- Thomas Dewar Weldon (1896–1958), British philosopher
- Thomas King Weldon (1826–1894), New Zealand police officer
- George and Thomas Weldon, builders in Mississippi
