= Percy Watkins =

Welsh civil servant (1871–1946)

Sir Percy Emerson Watkins (3 December 1871 – 5 May 1946) was a Welsh civil servant and public administrator.

Born on 3 December 1871 at Llanfyllin, he attended the high school in Oswestry before he was appointed clerk of the Central Welsh Board in 1896. He was Chief Clerk to the Education Department of the West Riding of Yorkshire from 1904 to 1911, and was then registrar of the University College, Cardiff, from 1911 to 1913 and Assistant Secretary to the Welsh Insurance Commission from 1913 to 1925. In the latter year, he became Permanent Secretary of the Welsh Department of the Board of Education, serving until 1933.

At the Welsh Department, he improved the relations between the department and the Central Welsh Board, prompted surveys on Welsh language teaching, and was an advocate of adult education. From 1933, he led the Council of Social Services in Wales. In the view of the historian R. Lewis, Watkins belonged to a "social radical coterie"; for him, unemployment in the Welsh valleys in the 1920s and 1930s was "a barrier to the emergence of an educated democracy in Wales" to which the implementation of social services offered a chance "to foster the old Welsh ideal of a democratic popular culture". He was knighted in 1930 and died on 5 May 1946, having published an autobiography two years earlier.

Government offices
| Preceded by Sir Alfred Davies | Permanent Secretary of the Welsh Department, Board of Education; 1925–1933 | Succeeded by Sir Wynn Wheldon |
