= Alfred Thomas Davies =

Alfred Thomas Davies could refer to:

- Sir Alfred Davies (civil servant) (1861–1949), education official
- Sir Alfred Davies (Lincoln MP) (1881–1941), politician
