= Wynn Wheldon =

Welsh civil servant

Sir Wynn Powell Wheldon, KBE, DSO (22 December 1879 – 10 November 1961) was a Welsh civil servant.

Born on 22 December 1879, he was the son of the Rev. Thomas Jones Wheldon. He attended the high school at Oswestry before studying at the University College of North Wales and St John's College, Cambridge. He practised as a lawyer in London before serving in the First World War as an officer. He was wounded and received the Distinguished Service Order (DSO) in 1917.

Following the war, Wheldon was appointed secretary and registrar of Bangor College in 1919, serving until 1933. In the latter year, he was appointed Permanent Secretary of the Welsh Department at the Board of Education, retiring in 1945. He was subsequently chairman of the Welsh committee for the Festival of Britain and of the Council for School Broadcasting for Wales; he served on the council of the University of Wales and was president of the Cymmrodorion Society. He was knighted in 1939 and appointed a Knight Commander of the Order of the British Empire (KBE) in the 1952 New Year Honours. He died on 10 November 1961 aged 81.

Government offices
Preceded by Sir Percy Watkins	Permanent Secretary of the Welsh Department, Board of Education; 1933–1945	Succeeded by Sir Ben Bowen Thomas
