= Herbert Andrew =

English civil servant (1910–1985)

Sir George Herbert Andrew, KCMG, CB (19 March 1910 – 18 August 1985) was an English civil servant. Educated at Corpus Christi College, Oxford, he entered the Patent Office in 1931, moving to the Board of Trade in 1938, where he became second secretary in 1955 and was heavily involved in negotiations to enter the Common Market in 1961–63. He moved to the Ministry of Education in 1963 as a deputy secretary; later that year, he was appointed Permanent Secretary. In 1964, the Ministry became the Department for Education and Science and he remained Permanent Secretary, jointly initially and then alone until he retired in 1970. In retirement, was ordained a priest in the Church of England and served in several curacies in Yorkshire.

Government offices
Preceded by Dame Mary Smieton	Permanent Secretary of the Ministry of Education; 1963–1964	Succeeded by himself and Sir Maurice Dean as Permanent Secretaries of the Department for Education and Science
Preceded by himself as Permanent Secretary of the Ministry of Education	Permanent Secretary of the Department for Education and Science; 1964–1970; With: Sir Maurice Dean (1964); Sir Bruce Fraser (1964–1965)	Succeeded by Sir William Pile
