= James Barnes (civil servant) =

English civil servant

Barnes in 1948.

Sir James Horace Barnes, KCB KBE (14 December 1891 – 4 February 1969) was an English civil servant. Educated at Manchester Grammar School and Merton College, Oxford, he entered the civil service in 1919 as an official in the Air Ministry. He was Deputy Director of Civil Aviation from 1940 to 1941 and the Joint Deputy Under Secretary of State from 1943 to 1945, when he became the sole Deputy Under Secretary. He was subsequently Permanent Secretary of the Air Ministry from 1947 from 1955. At the time of his retirement, he was the only official to have worked closely with every Chief of the Air Staff to date.

Government offices
Preceded by Sir William Brown	Permanent Secretary of the Air Ministry; 1947–1955	Succeeded by Sir Maurice Dean
