= Gilbert Flemming =

Permanent Secretary to the Ministry of Education

Sir Gilbert Nicolson Flemming, KCB (13 October 1897 – 24 October 1981) was an English civil servant.

The son of Percy Flemming, a ophthalmologist, he was educated at Rugby School before service in the Rifle Brigade during the First World War. He then attended Trinity College, Oxford. He did not graduate and entered the civil service in 1921 as an official in the Board of Education. He served in the Cabinet Office and then the Office of the Minister of Production from 1939 to 1943. Returning to the Ministry of Education in 1943, he implemented the Emergency Training Scheme for returning service members to become teachers, allowing the school leaving age to be raised. Subsequently, he was responsible for teacher training generally, including the implementation of the McNair Committee's recommendations. Promoted to Deputy Secretary in 1950, he was Permanent Secretary of the Ministry of Education from 1952 to 1959. After retiring, he chaired the governing body of the National College of Agricultural Engineering from 1960, chaired a commission into civil service salaries in East Africa in 1960 and led an inquiry into the grading of the Clerk of the House of Commons's department in 1961.

Government offices
Preceded by Sir John Redcliffe-Maud	Permanent Secretary of the Ministry of Education; 1952–1959	Succeeded by Dame Mary Smieton
