= John Redcliffe-Maud, Baron Redcliffe-Maud =

British civil servant and diplomat (1906–1982)

The Right Honourable The Lord Redcliffe-Maud GCB CBE
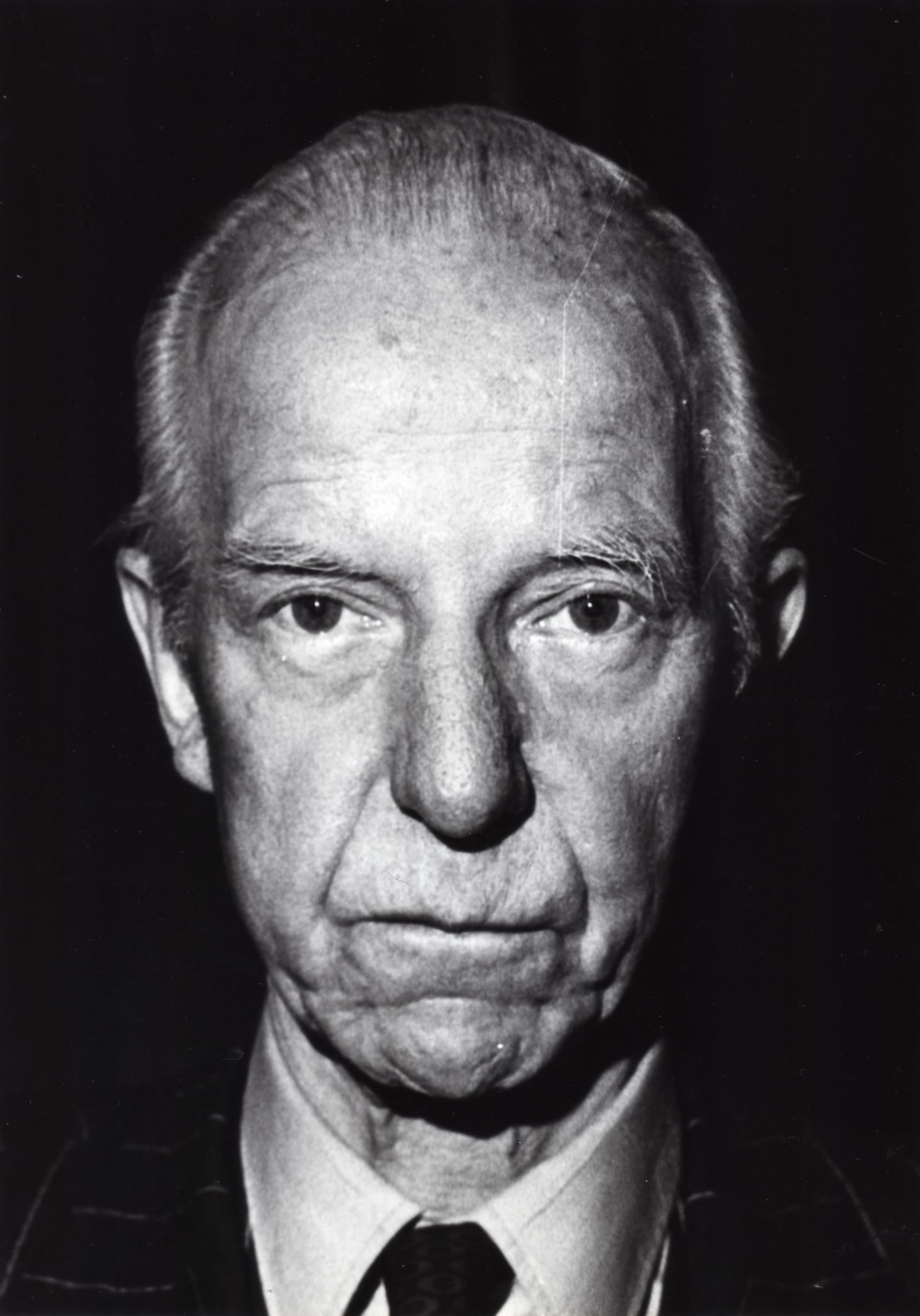
- Portrait of Redcliffe-Maud

Personal details
- Born: John Primatt Redcliffe Maud; 3 February 1906 Bristol, England
- Died: 20 November 1982 (aged 76) Oxford, England
- Resting place: Holywell Cemetery, Oxford, England
- Spouse: Jean Hamilton
- Children: 4, including Humphrey
- Occupation: Civil servant

John Primatt Redcliffe Redcliffe-Maud, Baron Redcliffe-Maud, GCB, CBE (3 February 1906 – 20 November 1982) was a British civil servant and diplomat. He headed the Royal Commission on Local Government in England, which published the Redcliffe-Maud Report, a proposal on local government reorganization, in 1969. He was High Commissioner to the Union of South Africa from 1959 to 1961 and Master of University College, Oxford from 1963 to 1976.

== Early life ==
Born in Bristol, Maud was educated at Eton College and New College, Oxford. He gained a Second in Classical Moderations in 1928 and a First in Literae Humaniores ('Greats') in 1928. At Oxford he was a member of the Oxford University Dramatic Society (OUDS). In 1928, he gained the one-year Henry P. Davison scholarship to Harvard University where he was awarded an A.B. in 1929. From 1929 to 1932 he was a junior research fellow of University College, Oxford and from 1932 to 1939 fellow (Praelector in Politics) and dean of the college. He was awarded a Rhodes Travelling Scholarship to Africa in 1932 and held a university lectureship in Politics at Oxford University, 1938–1939.

== Civil service ==
During World War II, he was Master of Birkbeck College, London (1939–1943) and was also based at Reading Gaol, working for the Ministry of Food. He was appointed a Commander of the Order of the British Empire in 1942, and after the war he worked at the Ministry of Education (1945–1952), rising to permanent secretary there, and then at the Ministry of Fuel and Power until 1958. He was made a Knight Commander of the Order of the Bath in 1946, and was raised to a Knight Grand Cross in 1955. Inter alia, Maud appeared on the BBC programme The Brains Trust in 1958. He was High Commissioner to the Union of South Africa from 1959 to 1961, and Ambassador from 1961, when the country became a republic and left the Commonwealth. In 1963, he became Master of University College, Oxford, where he had been a fellow before the war.

== The Maud Committee ==
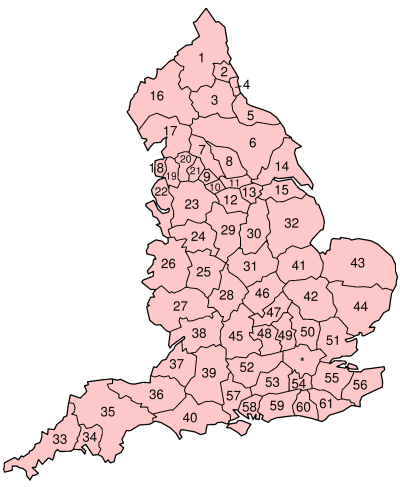
Local government in England as proposed by the 1969 Redcliffe-Maud Report

In March 1964, Maud was appointed by Minister for Housing and Local Government Sir Keith Joseph, at the request of local council associations, to head a departmental committee looking into the management of local government. The Maud Committee reported three years later. During the course of the inquiry, Maud was chosen to head a royal commission on the reform of all local government in England. He was awarded a life peerage, hyphenating his surname to become Baron Redcliffe-Maud, of the City and County of Bristol in 1967.

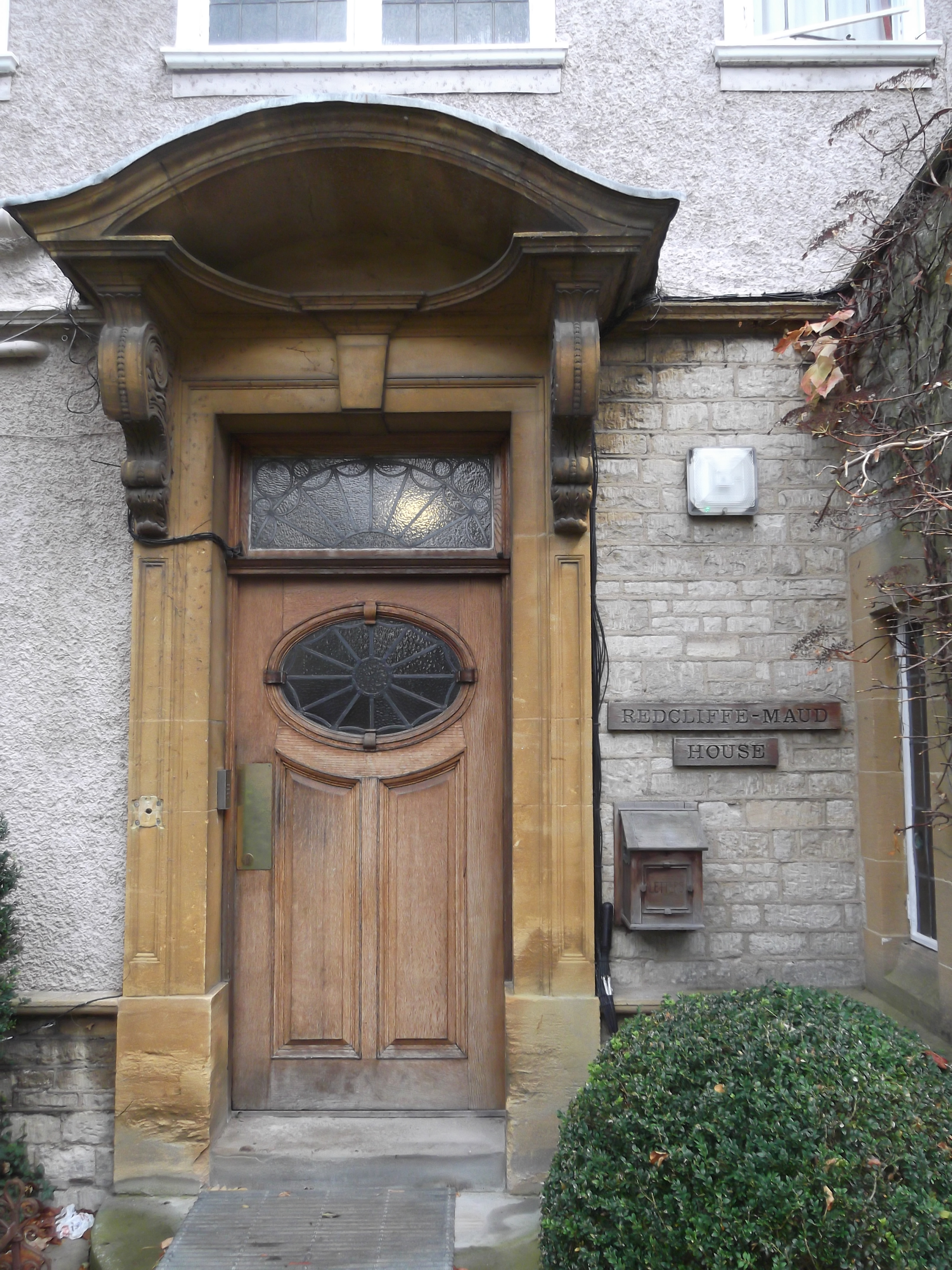
Main entrance of the Redcliffe-Maud House at the University College Annexe "Stavertonia" in North Oxford

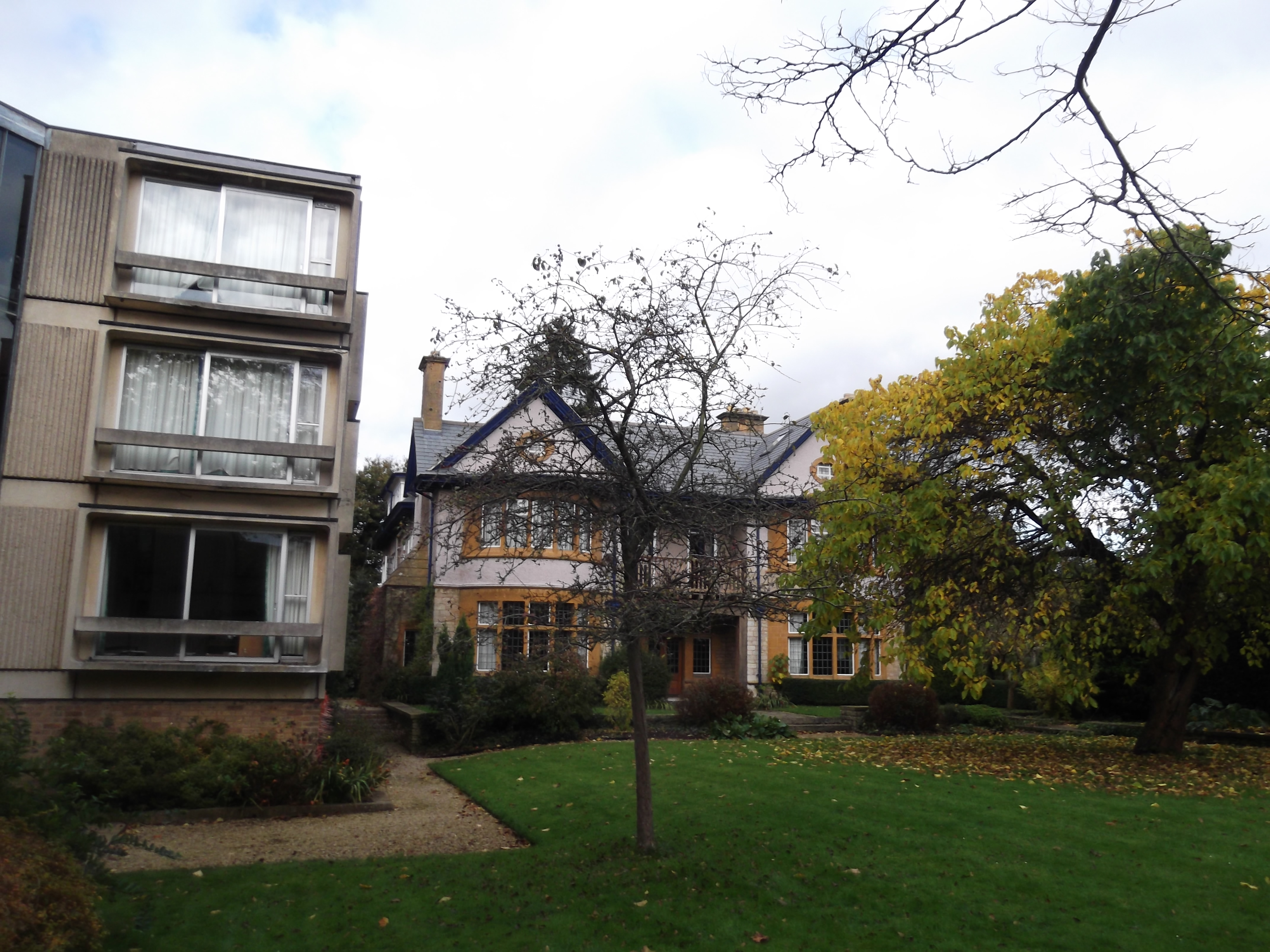
Redcliffe-Maud House in North Oxford, named in his honour

The Report of the Royal Commission on Local Government in England, popularly known as the Redcliffe-Maud Report, was published in 1969. It advocated the wholesale reform of local council boundaries and the institution of large unitary councils based on the principle of mixing rural and urban areas. Accepted by the Labour government of Harold Wilson with minor changes, the opposition from rural areas convinced the Conservative opposition to oppose it and no further action was taken after the Conservatives won the 1970 general election.

== Retirement ==
He retired as Master of University College in 1976, to be succeeded by Lord Goodman. His 1973 portrait by Ruskin Spear can be seen in the National Portrait Gallery, London. Another portrait hangs in the Hall at University College in Oxford.

== Family ==
Redcliffe-Maud was married to Jean Hamilton, who was educated at Somerville College, Oxford. His son, Humphrey Maud, was one of Benjamin Britten's favourite boys while he was at Eton. Sir John intervened to curtail Humphrey's frequent visits to stay with Britten on his own. The incident is described in John Bridcut's Britten's Children.

== Death and legacy ==
John Redcliffe-Maud is buried in Holywell Cemetery, Oxford. His archive is held by the London School of Economics Library. Redcliffe-Maud House at the University College Annexe known as "Stavertonia" in North Oxford is named in honour of him.

== Books ==
- Redcliffe-Maud, John, Experiences of an Optimist: The Memoirs of John Redcliffe-Maud. London: Hamish Hamilton, 1981. (ISBN 0-241-10569-2.)
- Redcliffe-Maud, Lord, & Wood, Bruce, English Local Government Reformed. Oxford University Press, 1974. ISBN 0-198-88091-X.

Government offices
Preceded by Sir Maurice Holmes as Permanent Secretary of the Board of Education	Permanent Secretary of the Ministry of Education; 1945–1952	Succeeded by Sir Gilbert Flemming
Preceded by Sir Donald Fergusson	Permanent Secretary of the Ministry of Fuel and Power (Ministry of Power from 1957); 1952–1958	Succeeded by Dennis Proctor
Diplomatic posts
Preceded by Percivale Liesching	British High Commissioner to South Africa; 1959–1961	Succeeded by Himself as British Ambassador to South Africa
Preceded by Himself as British High Commissioner to South Africa	British Ambassador to South Africa; 1961–1963	Succeeded by Sir Hugh Stephenson
Academic offices
Preceded by Arthur Goodhart	Master of University College, Oxford; 1963–1976	Succeeded by Arnold Goodman
