= Staverton Road =

Street in North Oxford, England

Coordinates: 51.7715°N 1.2649°W

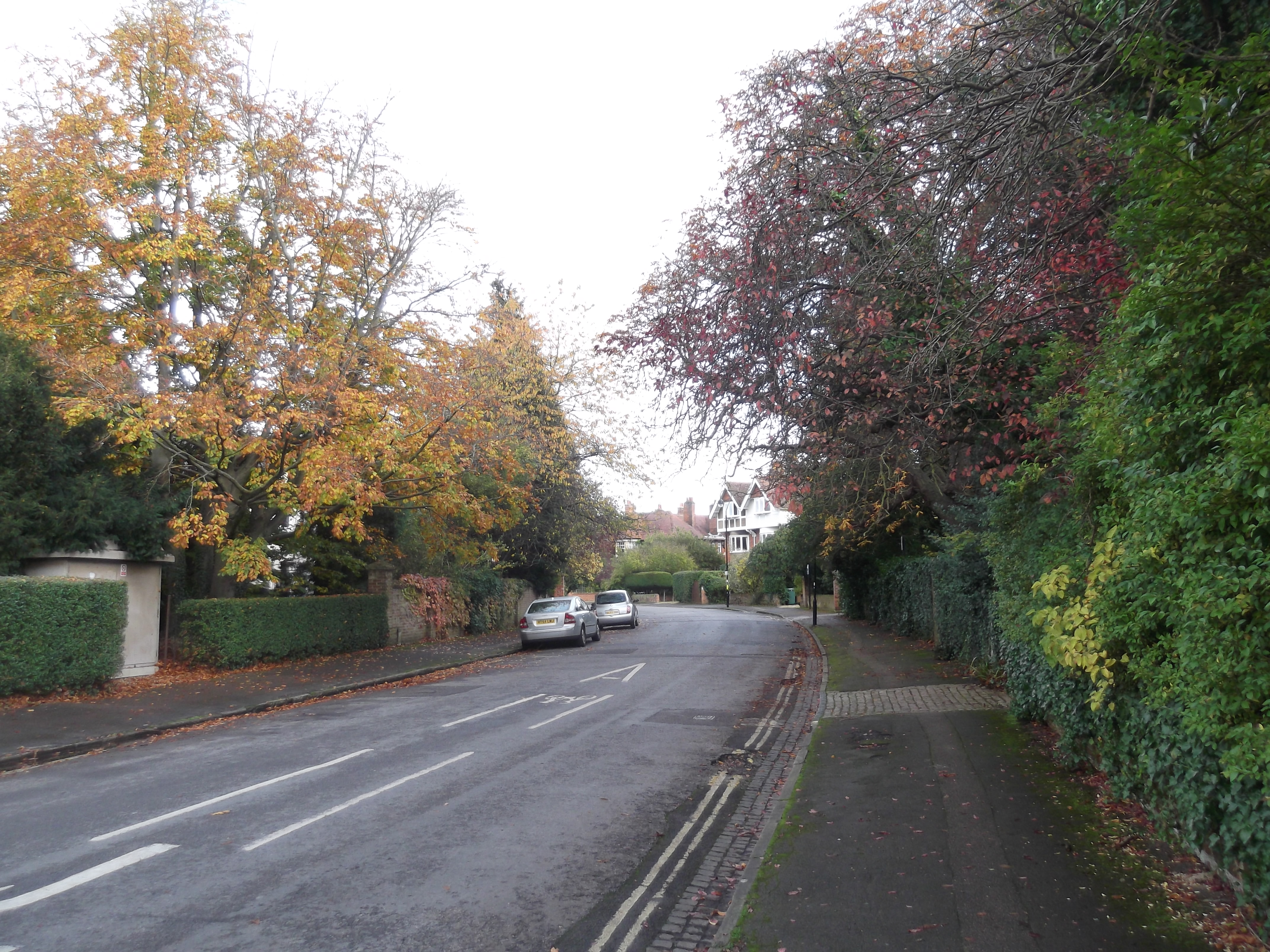
View east along Staverton Road from the junction with Woodstock Road

Staverton Road is a residential road in North Oxford, England.

== Location ==
The road runs east–west with a gentle curve halfway along. At the western end of the road is a junction with Woodstock Road (A4144) and at the eastern end is a junction with Banbury Road (A4165), the two major arterial roads out of Oxford to the north. Opposite slightly to the north at the western end is Frenchay Road. Opposite slightly to the south at the eastern end is Belbroughton Road. Parallel to the south is Rawlinson Road and to the north is Lathbury Road. It forms the approximate northern boundary of the original North Oxford development by St John's College, Oxford, along with Frenchay Road to the west and Marston Ferry Road to the east.

== Stavertonia ==
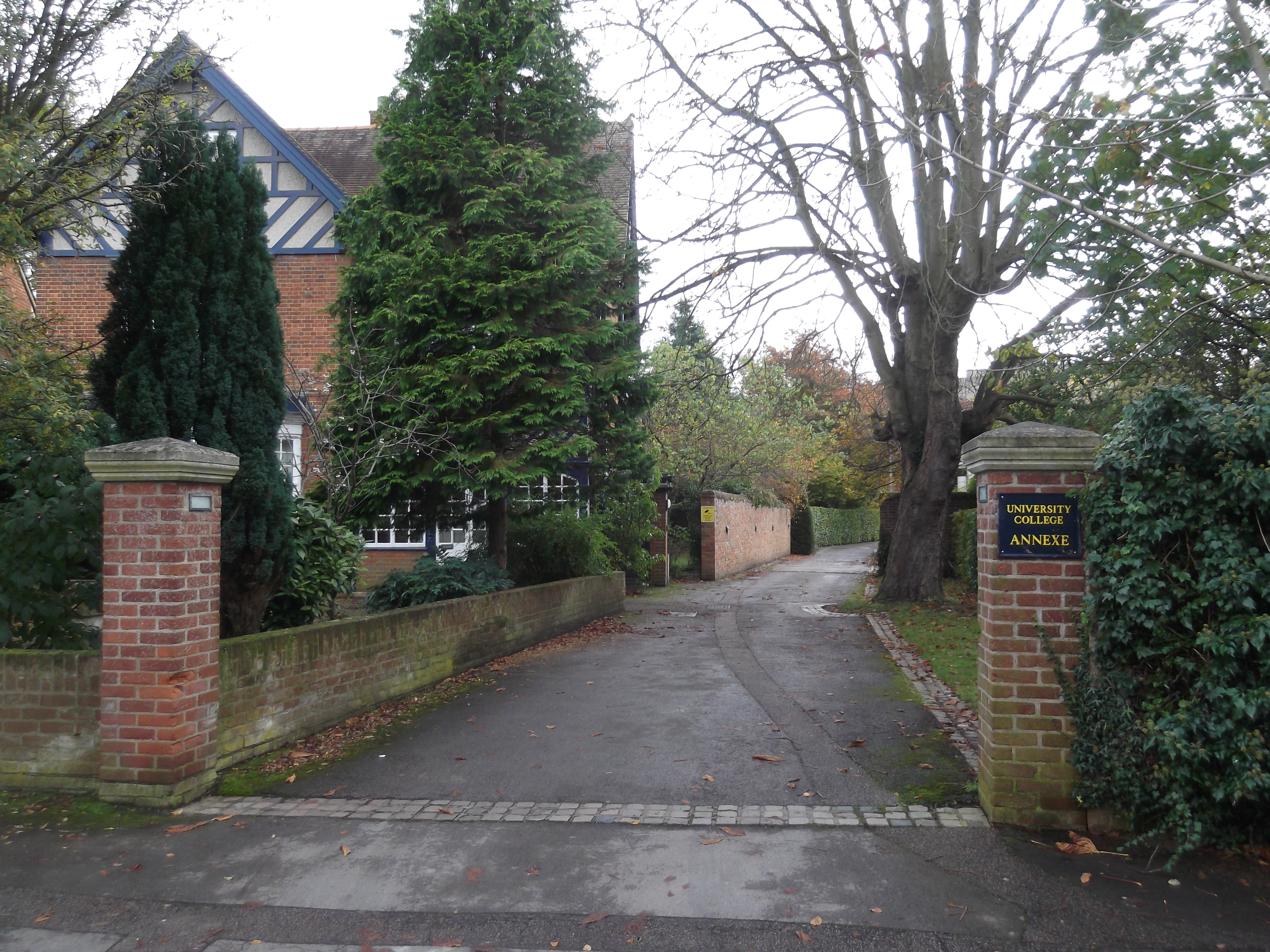
Entrance to the University College Annexe known as Stavertonia, south of Staverton Road

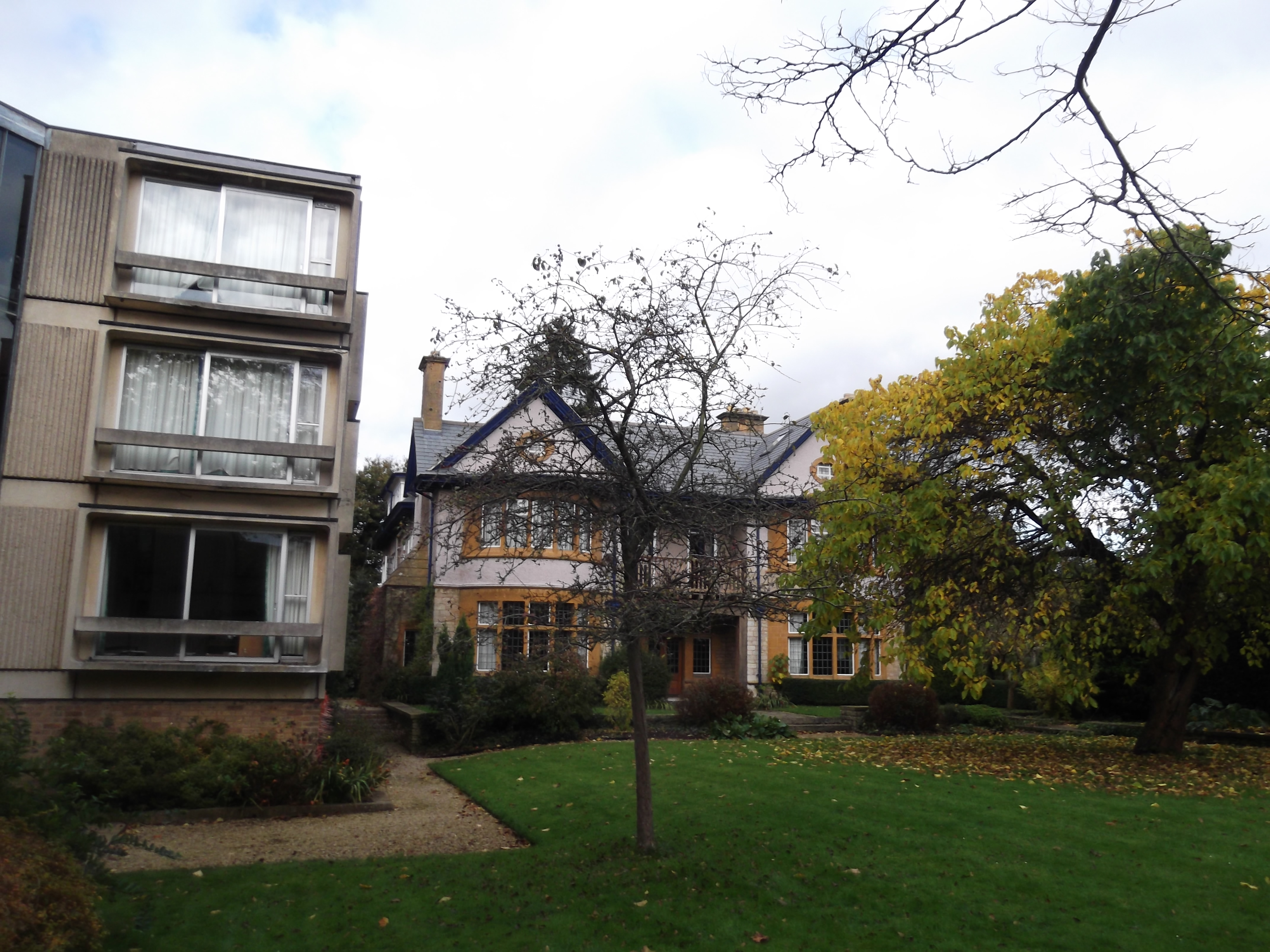
Redcliffe-Maud House on the Stavertonia site

"Stavertonia" (a.k.a. Stavs and formerly Stavers), or the University College Annexe, a student accommodation complex of buildings for University College, Oxford, is located south of the road, largely built from 1967. The new buildings were designed by the University College alumnus Sir Philip Dowson of Arup Associates. Staverton House, at 104 Woodstock Road close to Staverton Road, was bought by University College in 1953 and converted into flats. Lord Beveridge (1878–1963), Master of University College from 1937–45, rented one of the flats for a while. The site includes Redcliffe-Maud House (formerly 100A Woodstock Road, built in the garden of 100 Woodstock Road), named after a former Master of University College at the time of the development of Stavertonia, Lord Redcliffe-Maud.

As of 2022, the Stavertonia site is being further extended and developed to become Univ North (formally University College, North Oxford), stretching all the way to Banbury Road, expanding the existing 12,000 m^{2} site by 8,000 m^{2}.

Trinity College, Oxford has an annexe on the north corner of Staverton Road with Woodstock Road, providing accommodation for over 70 members of the college. It was built in 1979 to a design by the architect Simon Shew of Grey and Baynes.

== Residents ==
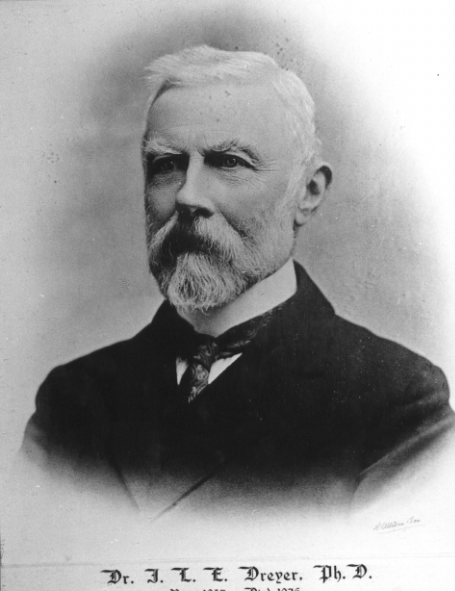
The astronomer John Louis Emil Dreyer, who lived and died at 14 Staverton Road

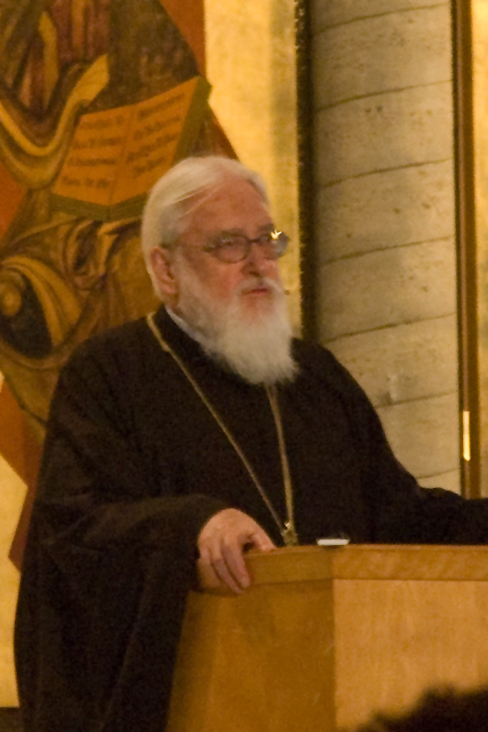
The bishop and theologian Timothy Ware, who lived in Staverton Road

The Danish-Irish astronomer John Louis Emil Dreyer (1852–1926) lived at 14 Staverton Road from 30 September 1916 onwards with his wife Kate. While in Oxford, he worked on his 15-volume edited collection of the works of the Danish astronomer Tycho Brahe. On 14 September 1926, Dreyer died at his home in Staverton Road.

England's first woman barrister and tutor at St Anne's College, Ivy Williams, lived at 30 Staverton Road until her death in 1966.

The theologian and bishop within the Eastern Orthodox Church, Kallistos Ware (born Timothy Ware, 1934), lived with his parents at 15 Staverton Road.

Other residents include the ecological economist Stanislav Edward Shmelev, Sir William D. M. Paton FRS (1917–1993), winner of the Gairdner Foundation International Award in 1959 and Professor of Pharmacology at the University of Oxford, and the solid-state physicist H. M. Rosenberg.

The fictional character George Papadimitriou called a meeting of the Oakley Street resistance group at 28 Staverton Road in Philip Pullman’s The Book of Dust, Volume One, "La Belle Sauvage", chapter 13.
