= Mary Smieton =

British civil servant (1902–2005)

Dame Mary Guillan Smieton, DBE (5 December 1902 – 23 January 2005) was a British civil servant. She served as Permanent Secretary in the Ministry of Education between 1959 and 1963, only the second woman to achieve the rank of Permanent Secretary. Prior to this, she was Permanent Under-Secretary at the Ministry of Education, having joined the civil service in 1925. She studied at Bedford College, London (now Royal Holloway, University of London) and Lady Margaret Hall, Oxford.

Brian Harrison recorded an oral history interview with Smieton, in May 1977, as part of the Suffrage Interviews project, titled Oral evidence on the suffragette and suffragist movements: the Brian Harrison interviews. Smieton talks about her experiences as a woman civil servant, how she benefitted from the National Society for Women's Suffrage and her extensive involvement with the Women's Voluntary Service, now known as the Royal Voluntary Service.

Smieton was a benefactor of The Wildlife Trusts who make an annual award in her name.

Government offices
Preceded by Sir Gilbert Flemming	Permanent Secretary of the Ministry of Education; 1959–1963	Succeeded by Sir Herbert Andrew
