= Jean Redcliffe-Maud =

British pianist (1904–1993)

Margaret Jean Redcliffe-Maud, Baroness Redcliffe-Maud (née Hamilton; 1904 – 6 November 1993), was a British pianist.

== Biography ==
Jean Hamilton was educated at Somerville College, Oxford. She married John Maud, later to become Lord Redcliffe-Maud, on 20 June 1932 in Oxford. On 1 July of that year, they sailed for South Africa and she kept a diary of her experiences in Africa that was later published in book form.

Hamilton was a professional pianist. There is now a "John and Jean Redcliffe Maud prize" in the Contemporary Piano Competition at the Royal College of Music in London.

Hamilton co-founded the University College Musical Society with her then fiancé, John Maud. The first concert organised by the society was held in a lecture room at 90 High Street, one of the college-owned houses, on 1 June 1930. Hamilton accompanied the tenor singer Steuart Wilson.

The Young Person's Guide to the Orchestra, opus 34, is a 1946 musical composition by Benjamin Britten that in the composer's words "is affectionately inscribed to the children of John and Jean Maud: Humphrey, Pamela, Caroline and Virginia, for their edification and entertainment."

She was the master's wife at University College, Oxford, from 1963 to 1976. She performed piano recitals and appeared in the Univ Revue there. She retired to live on the Woodstock Road in North Oxford with her husband and died on 6 November 1993.

Jean Redcliffe-Maud is buried in Holywell Cemetery, Oxford, with her husband.

== Books ==
- Redcliffe-Maud, Jean (1989). From the Cape to Cairo 1932.
