= Arthur Street =

English civil servant

Sir Arthur William Street, GCB, KBE, CMG, CIE, MC (16 May 1892 – 24 February 1951) was a British civil servant. He joined the civil service as a boy clerk at the age of 14 and studied at King's College London while working. His career was interrupted by service in the First World War; after demobilisation in 1919 he worked in the Ministry of Agriculture and Fisheries (with the exception of the period 1921–22 when was in the Admiralty); he was second secretary from 1936 to 1938. In 1938, he moved to the Air Ministry; from 1939 to 1945, he was its Permanent Secretary, serving throughout the Second World War. He was then the Permanent Secretary of the Control Office for Germany and Austria from 1945 to 1946, before serving as deputy chairman of the National Coal Board until his death.

Government offices
Preceded by Sir Donald Banks	Permanent Secretary of the Air Ministry; 1939–1945	Succeeded by Sir William Brown
Preceded by none	Secretary to the Control Office for Austria and Germany; 1945–1946	Succeeded by Sir Gilmour Jenkins
