= Weldon mud =

Type of chlorine

Weldon mud is a precipitation of manganese used in the production of chlorine.

Walter Weldon developed a process in the chlorine production process for reuse of manganese by treating the manganese chloride with milk of lime and blowing air through the mixture to form a precipitation of manganese known as Weldon mud, which was used to generate more chlorine.
