= Bruce Fraser (civil servant) =

- Born: 18 November 1910
- Died: 22 August 1993 (aged 82)
- Education: Bedford School & Trinity College, Cambridge
- Occupation: civil servant

Sir Bruce Donald Fraser KCB (18 November 1910 – 22 August 1993) was a Scottish civil servant in the United Kingdom.

== Biography ==
Born on 18 November 1910, Bruce Fraser was educated at Bedford School and at Trinity College, Cambridge. He served in the Scottish Office (1933), HM Treasury (1936–1960), the Ministry of Aviation (1960), the Ministry of Health (1960–1964), the Department of Education and Science (1964–1965), the Ministry of Land and Natural Resources (1965–1966). He finished his civil service career as Comptroller and Auditor General, the head of the Exchequer and Audit Department (now the National Audit Office) from 1966–1971.

In the period from 1966–1968, Fraser served as External Auditor of the International Maritime Organization (IMO), which was formerly known as the Inter-Governmental Maritime Consultative Organization (IMCO).

He is probably best known now for revising Sir Ernest Gowers’ classic book The Complete Plain Words, written to teach officials and others how to write clearly. By the early 1970s the language had moved on from the post-war era when Gowers had written the first edition. The publisher, HMSO, felt the need to publish an updated version, despite some resistance to tampering with a classic.

Fraser was widely judged to have succeeded. His style is more robust than the elegant Gowers, though he is just as masterly in his use of the language. Stylistically they have been compared to George Lyttelton (Gowers) and Rupert Hart-Davis (Fraser) of the Lyttelton/Hart-Davis Letters. Both editions can be read for pleasure as well as instruction. Fraser enlivens the text with such howlers as:

- I have discussed the question of stocking the proposed poultry plant with my colleagues.
- Bulletin No. 160 on Housing of Pigs from Her Majesty’s Stationery Office.
- Authority is given for you to proceed and gas, preferably yourself
- It was here that the Emperor liked to put on his grand alfresco spectacles.
- Nothing is less likely to appeal to a young woman than the opinions of old men on the pill.
- People in the South East keep their teeth longer than people in the North.
- Prices of different models vary and you should take the advice of an expert on the make.
- Ladies who have kindly undertaken to act as school crossing wardens are reminded again that if they attempt to carry out their duties without their clothing on motorists are unlikely to take notice of them.

Fraser adds, ‘Let us not be too censorious about passages like these. They are careless, of course, but they add to the gaiety of life. Let him who is quite sure he has never committed one cast the first stone.’ (Note how in 1973 an official style guide did not feel the need to use gender-neutral language. By the time of the next edition (see next paragraph) there were many pages devoted to that subject. 'Tempora mutantur', Fraser might have remarked, had he not been averse to gratuitous insertion of Latin tags into plain English prose.)

In its turn the Fraser edition of Plain Words grew out of date and was superseded in 1986 by a complete revision by two academics, which remains instructive but is perhaps less likely to be read for pleasure.

== Honours ==
- Companion of the Order of the Bath (CB), 1956.
- Knight Commander of the Order of the Bath (KCB), 1961.

== Notes ==
Government offices
Preceded by Sir Herbert Andrew and Sir Maurice Dean	Permanent Secretary of the Department for Education and Science; 1964–1965; With: Sir Herbert Andrew	Succeeded by Sir Herbert Andrew
