= William Brown (civil servant) =

English civil servant

Sir William Barrowclough Brown, KCB, KCMG, CBE (1893 – 11 February 1947) was an English civil servant. (Note: His middle name was spelt Barrowclough in The London Gazette, The Times and various legal documents, but Who's Who have it as the hyphenated "Barrow-clough" and the published register of King's College, Cambridge records it as "Barraclough".) Educated at the Royal Grammar School, Newcastle upon Tyne and King's College, Cambridge, he served in the Northumberland Fusiliers during the First World War and was wounded. He entered the civil service in 1918 as a temporary official in the Board of Trade, before being appointed to a substantive position in 1919. He was Second Secretary at the Board of Trade from 1934 to 1935 and was the Chief Industrial Adviser to the Government until 1937. From 1937 to 1940 he was Permanent Secretary of the Board of Trade; he was then successively Permanent Secretary to the Ministry of Supply (1940 to 1942), the Ministry of Home Security (1943 to 1945) and the Air Ministry (from 1945). He carried out a special mission to the United States in 1944, but ill health and stress contributed to several periods of leave over the course of his career. He died still in office at the Air Ministry aged 53.

Government offices
Preceded by Sir Arthur Street	Permanent Secretary of the Air Ministry; 1945–1947	Succeeded by Sir James Barnes
