= Gilmour Jenkins =

British civil servant

Sir Thomas Gilmour Jenkins, KCB, KBE, MC (18 July 1894 – 9 September 1981), commonly known as Gilmour Jenkins, was a British civil servant.

Jenkins was educated at Rutlish School and later took an external degree course of the University of London, gaining a B.Sc. in 1916. He served in the Royal Garrison Artillery during World War I, and was awarded the Military Cross and bar in 1918. He returned to the civil service, which he had joined in 1913, in 1919 as an official in the Board of Trade. He was appointed Second Secretary of the Ministry of Shipping in 1939, and was then Deputy Director-General of the Ministry of War Transport from 1941, with responsibility for shipping.

Jenkins was then Permanent Secretary of the Control Commission for Germany and Austria from 1946 to 1947 and, after the commission was taken over the Foreign Office, he was briefly Joint Permanent Secretary of the Foreign Office in 1947. He was successively Permanent Secretary of the Ministry of Transport from 1947 to 1953 and the Ministry of Transport and Civil Aviation from 1953 to 1959. He then sat on the board of several shipping companies and served as president of the Institute of Marine Engineers (1953–54) and the Institute of Transport (1954–55). He was appointed chairman of the Royal Academy of Music in 1967 and became its vice-president in 1974.

Government offices
Preceded by Sir Arthur Street	Secretary to the Control Commission for Austria and Germany; 1946–1947	Succeeded by none
