= Alfred Davies (civil servant) =

British civil servant (1861–1949)

Sir Alfred Thomas Davies, KBE, CB, DL, JP (11 March 1861 – 21 April 1949) was a British civil servant, solicitor and local politician.

Born on 11 March 1861 at Liverpool, he attended the University College of Wales, Aberystwyth, before practising as a solicitor in Liverpool from 1883 to 1907. In the meantime, he was involved in the temperance movement and sat on local government committees. From 1904 to 1907, he was a councillor on the Denbighshire County Council. Having been a member of that council's education committee, he was appointed the Permanent Secretary of the newly established Welsh Department in the national Board of Education. He retired in 1925, having been appointed a Companion of the Order of the Bath (CB) in 1917 and a Knight Commander of the Order of the British Empire (KBE) in 1918. He was a deputy lieutenant and magistrate for both Denbighshire and Buckinghamshire. He died on 21 April 1949.

Government offices
Preceded by none	Permanent Secretary of the Welsh Department, Board of Education; 1907–1925	Succeeded by Sir Percy Watkins
