= Rawlinson Road =

Road in North Oxford, England

Coordinates: 51.7687°N 1.2641°W

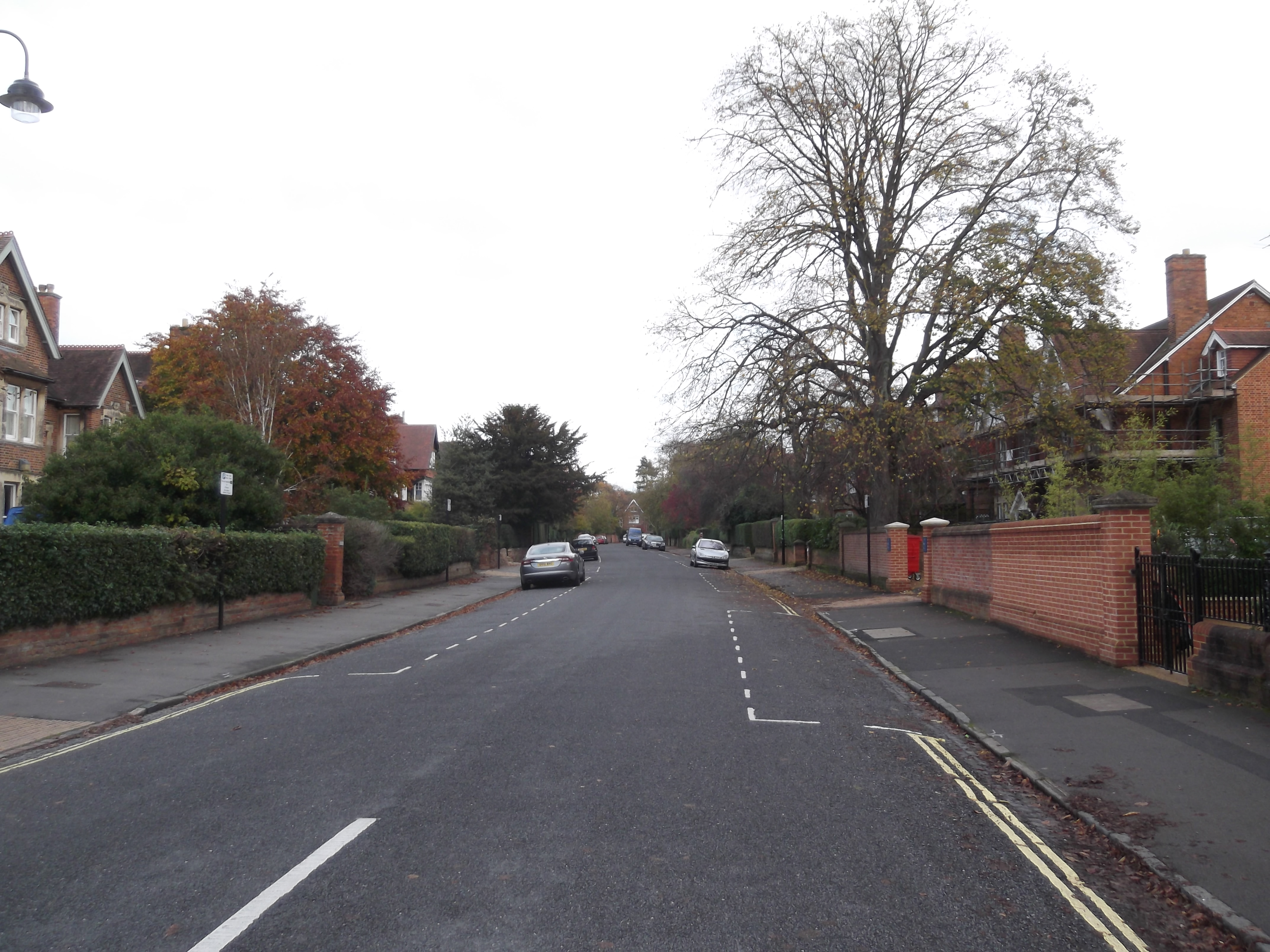
View east along Rawlinson Road from the junction with Woodstock Road.

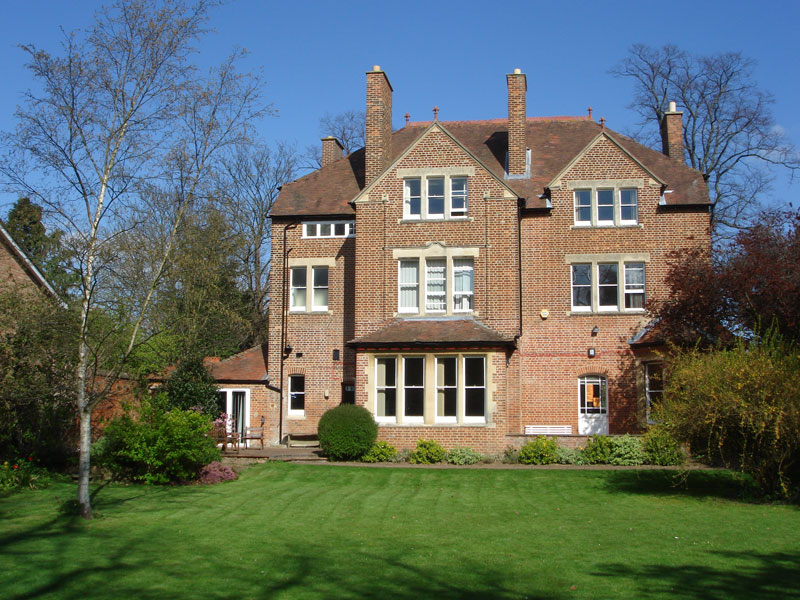
The Swan Building of d'Overbroeck's College, just to the north of the eastern end of Rawlinson Road at 111 Banbury Road.

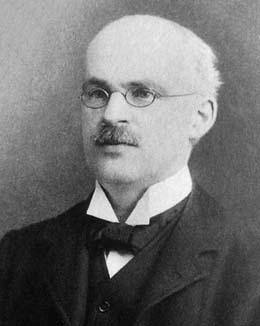
The mathematician John Edward Campbell FRS (1862–1924), who lived at 14 Rawlinson Road.

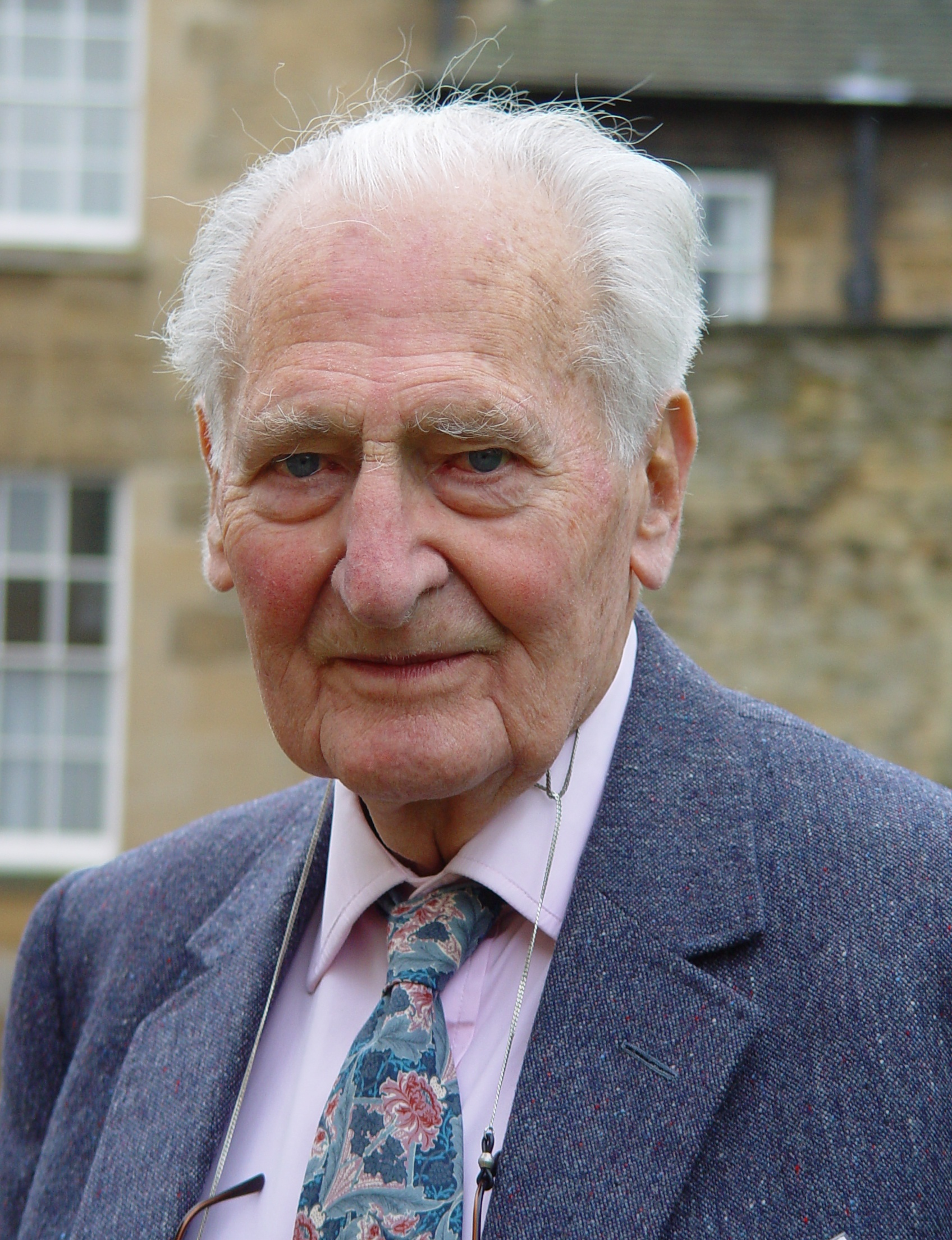
The epidemiologist Sir Richard Doll CH OBE FRS (1912–2005), who lived at 12 Rawlinson Road.

Rawlinson Road is a residential road in North Oxford, England.

== Location ==
At the western end of the road is a junction with Woodstock Road (A4144) and at the eastern end is a junction with Banbury Road (A4165), the two major arterial roads out of Oxford to the north. Opposite slightly to the south at the western end is Polstead Road. Opposite slightly to the north at the eastern end is Linton Road. Parallel to the south is St Margaret's Road and to the north is Staverton Road.

Just to the south at 90 Woodstock Road is the Junior School (nursery to year 1) of the Oxford High School (formerly the Squirrel School). Just to the north at 111 Banbury Road is the Swan Building, the main teaching centre for the Sixth Form of d'Overbroeck's College. Balliol College, one of the colleges of Oxford University, operates a day nursery located in Rawlinson Road.

== History and residents ==
The area where Rawlinson Road is located was originally owned by St John's College, Oxford. The road was named after Dr Richard Rawlinson FRS (1690–1755), an antiquarian and divine. Houses in the road were first leased by the college between 1888 and 1893. They were designed by the architects Harry Wilkinson Moore and Herbert Quinton. The houses are in a late Victorian style and of brick construction.

The Irish-born mathematician John Edward Campbell (1862–1924) lived at 14 Rawlinson Road. Harriet Shaw Weaver (1876–1961), political activist and magazine editor, lived at 4 Rawlinson Road. The Hungarian-born member of the House of Lords and economist Thomas Balogh, Baron Balogh (1905–1985) lived in Rawlinson Road with his family.

Derbyshire House Hotel was located at 18 Rawlinson Road.

The poet John Betjeman (1906–1984) wrote of Rawlinson Road:

Too much, too many! so fetch the doctor,
This dress has grown such a heavier load
Since Jack was only a Junior Proctor,
And rents were lower in Rawlinson Road.

Sir Richard Doll (1912–2005), the epidemiologist and cancer pioneer, lived at 12 Rawlinson Road and a blue plaque was installed on his house in 2015. He lived here with his wife Joan Faulkner after his retirement in 1983.
