= Humphrey Maud =

British diplomat (1934–2013)

Sir Humphrey John Hamilton Maud

British Ambassador to Luxembourg
- In office 1982–1985

British Ambassador to Argentina
- In office 1990–1993

Commonwealth Deputy Secretary-General for Economic and Social Affairs
- In office 1993–1999

Personal details
- Born: 17 April 1934 United Kingdom
- Died: 10 November 2013 (aged 79)
- Education: King's College, Cambridge
- Occupation: Diplomat
- Awards: Knights Commander of the Order of St Michael and St George

Sir Humphrey John Hamilton Maud KCMG (17 April 1934 – 10 November 2013) was a British diplomat.

== Life ==
Humphrey Maud was the son of the civil servant and diplomat John Redcliffe-Maud, Baron Redcliffe-Maud and his wife, the pianist Jean Hamilton. He attended Eton College, where he was a favourite of Benjamin Britten - Britten dedicated The Young Person's Guide to the Orchestra to Humphrey and his siblings - though Humphrey's father eventually intervened to stop him spending so much time with Britten during the holidays.

Maud studied classics and history at King's College, Cambridge. After a year teaching classics at the University of Minnesota, he entered the Foreign Service in 1959.

Maud was the British Ambassador to Luxembourg from 1982 to 1985, and the British Ambassador to Argentina from 1990 to 1993. In 1993 he became Commonwealth Deputy Secretary-General with responsibility for economic and social affairs, holding the post until he retired in 1999.
