= Virginia V. Weldon =

Canadian-American endocrinologist

- Virginia Verral (later Weldon), from a 1953 newspaper
- Born: Virginia Ann Verral; September 8, 1935; Toronto, Canada
- Died: May 23, 2024 (age 88); St. Louis, Missouri, U.S.
- Occupation: Endocrinologist

Virginia Ann Verral Weldon (September 8, 1935 – May 23, 2024) was a Canadian-born American pediatric endocrinologist, medical school professor, and hospital administrator, based for most of her career at Washington University School of Medicine. She was also a vice president at Monsanto, from 1989 to 1998.

== Early life and education ==
Virginia Verral was born in Toronto, and raised in Elmira, New York, the daughter of John Edward Verral and Carolyn Edith Swift Verral. She graduated from Smith College in 1957, and earned her medical degree from the University of Buffalo School of Medicine in 1962. She pursued further studies in pediatric endocrinology at Johns Hopkins School of Medicine.

== Career ==
Weldon served an internship and residency at Johns Hopkins Hospital. In 1968, she joined the faculty of Washington University School of Medicine, and became a professor of pediatrics. She rose to full professor status in 1979, and was co-director of the school's Division of Pediatric Endocrinology and Metabolism. From 1980 to 1989, she was vice president of the Washington University Medical Campus. She returned to Washington University, in 1998, as director of the school's Center for the Study of American Business.

Weldon turned down an offer to head the United States Food and Drug Administration in 1984. She was chair of the Association of American Medical Colleges from 1985 to 1986. She was appointed to the President's Committee of Advisors on Science and Technology in 1994. She served on an advisory board at the National Institutes of Health. From 1989 to 1998, Weldon worked for Monsanto as an advisor, and as senior vice-president for public policy. From 1996, she was a member of the Caltech board of trustees. In 2000, she was appointed to a national advisory committee on agricultural biotechnology, in the United States Department of Agriculture. She was chair of the board of trustees of the St. Louis Symphony Orchestra, from 2000 to 2005.

Weldon was named a Woman of Achievement by the St. Louis Globe-Democrat in 1978. She received the Smith College Medal in 1984. In 1987, she was elected to the Institute of Medicine. She was a fellow of the American Association for the Advancement of Science (AAAS). She received an honorary Doctor of Science degree from Washington University in St. Louis in 2017.

== Publications ==
Weldon's research appeared in scholarly journals including The New England Journal of Medicine, Pediatrics, The Journal of Pediatrics, Journal of Clinical Investigation, Journal of Clinical Endocrinology and Metabolism, American Journal of Diseases of Children, American Journal of Medical Genetics, American Journal of the Medical Sciences, Academic Medicine, and Diabetes.

- "Newborn girls misdiagnosed as bilaterally cryptorchid males" (1966, with Robert M. Blizzard and Claude J. Migeon)
- "Comparative effect of animal prolactins and Human Growth Hormone (HGH) in hypopituitary children" (1966, with Robert M. Blizzard, Allan L. Drash, Melvin E. Jenkins, John S. Spaulding, Aaron Glick, Gerald F. Powell, and Salvatore Raiti)
- "Aldosterone secretion rates in normal subjects from infancy to adulthood" (1967, with Avinoam Kowarski and Claude J. Migeon)
- "Mortality risk of exchange transfusion" (1968, with Gerald B. Odell)
- "Transplacental passage and fetal secretion of aldosterone" (1970, with Francis Bayard, Isadore G. Ances, Alan J. Tapper, Avinoam Kowarski, and Claude J. Migeon)
- "The use of L-dopa in the diagnosis of hyposomatotropism in children" (1973, with Santosh K. Gupta, Morey W. Haymond, Anthony S. Pagliara, Laurence S. Jacobs, and William H. Daughaday)
- "Female pseudohermaphroditism secondary to a maternal virilizing tumor: Case report and review of the literature" (1973, with Morey W. Haymond)
- "Radioreceptor-inactive growth hormone associated with stimulated secretion in normal subjects" (1975, with David S. Sneid, Laurence S. Jacobs, Bakula L. Trivedi, and William H. Daughaday)
- "Evaluation of growth hormone release in children using arginine and l-dopa in combination" (1975, with Santosh K. Gupta, Georgeanna Klingensmith, William L. Clarke, Stephen C. Duck, Morey W. Haymond, and Anthony S. Pagliara)
- "The role of growth hormone and cortisone on glucose and gluconeogenic substrate regulation in fasted hypopituitary children" (1976, with Morey W. Haymond, Irene Karl, and Anthony S. Pagliara)
- "Cerebral edema complicating therapy for diabetic ketoacidosis" (1976, with Stephen C. Duck, Anthony S. Pagliara, and Morey W. Haymond)
- "Topically applied testosterone and phallic growth: Its effect in male children with hypopituitarism and microphallus" (1980, with Ehud Ben-Galim and Richard E. Hillman)
- "Fetal and maternal virilization associated with pregnancy" (1982, with Debra A. Cohen and William H. Daughaday)
- "Growth hormone-dependent growth failure" (1982, with Teresa Frazer, James R. Gavin, William H. Daughaday, and Richard E. Hillman)
- "Hypopituitarism and septooptic 'dysplasia' in first cousins" (1985, with Sandra L. Blethen, John M. Opitz, and James F. Reynolds)
- "Outcome in children with normal growth following removal of a craniopharyngioma" (1986, with Sandra L. Blethen)
- "Why the dinosaurs died: extinction or evolution?" (1987)

== Personal life ==
Weldon married twice. Her first husband, Clarence S. Weldon, was a cardiothoracic surgeon; they married in 1963 and had two daughters. Her second husband was Francis Austin Jr. She died in 2024, at the age of 88.
