= David Wheldon =

English writer and doctor

David Wheldon (1950 – 7 January 2021) was an English writer and medical doctor.

== Biography ==
David Wheldon was born in 1950 in the mining village of Moira, Leicestershire. He went to the Quaker school at Sidcot, Somerset, and graduated in medicine from Bristol University. He was the author of four novels, a short story collection, and several collections of poetry. He was married to the artist Sarah Longlands. He died unexpectedly at his Bedford home in January 2021 at the age of seventy.

== Writing ==
Wheldon's first novel The Viaduct won the Triple First Award in 1983. The judges were Graham Greene and William Trevor. It was a runner-up in The Whitbread Award. It was republished in the USA and widely reviewed.

His first three novels are often described as allegorical and Kafkaesque. Wheldon has written that he first read Kafka after completing The Viaduct and an early version of A Vocation.

He published several volumes of poetry with The Berkeleyan Eye, a publishing house set up with his wife the artist Sarah Longlands. The books are illustrated with her drawings, with poems individually illustrated in the volumes Uncompliant Stranger and Days and Orders.

After a couple of decades with no published fiction, from 2017 his short fiction began to appear in The Woven Tale Press, Confingo, and Nightjar Press. His short story collection The Guiltless Bystander was published by Confingo Publishing in July 2022.

His personal website contains several uncollected short stories, essays, and poems.

His first two novels The Viaduct and The Course of Instruction were reissued by Valancourt in November 2024.

== Medical career ==
At Bristol he had made a special study of the disease Multiple Sclerosis. In 2002 his wife, the artist Sarah Longlands, suddenly had difficulty walking and was diagnosed with MS. Wheldon published research on an antibiotic treatment of the disease, and claims to have successfully treated his wife. He began to treat others with what became known as "The Wheldon Protocol".

== Bibliography ==
=== Novels ===
- The Viaduct (1983)
- The Course of Instruction (1984)
- A Vocation (1986)
- At The Quay (1990)

=== Poetry ===
- The Uncompliant Stranger (1997)
- Onesimus (1997)
- Night Altitude (1999)
- Days and Orders (1998)
- Language in a Narrow Place (1998)
- Changes, Days, Lives (2000)
- A Lens to the Sun (2000)

=== Short stories ===
- The Guiltless Bystander (2022)
