= Walter Weldon =

English chemist, journalist, and publisher of needlework patterns (1832–1885)

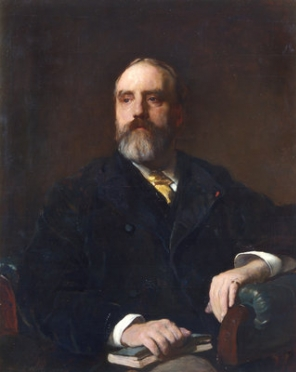
- Born: 31 October 1832; Loughborough, England
- Died: 20 September 1885 (aged 52); Burstow England

Walter Weldon FRS FRSE (31 October 1832 – 20 September 1885) was a 19th-century English industrial chemist and journalist. He was President of the Society of Chemical Industry from 1883-84.

== Life ==
He was born in Loughborough on 31 October 1832, the son of Reuben Weldon and his wife, Esther Fowke.

Weldon was brother to Ernest James Weldon, founder of Weldon & Wilkinson Ltd.

In 1854 he began work as a journalist in London with The Dial (which was afterwards incorporated in The Morning Star), and in 1860 he started a monthly magazine, Weldon's Register of Facts and Occurrences relating to Literature, the Sciences and the Arts, which was later discontinued. In the 1860s he turned to industrial chemistry, described below. However, he is remembered for his pattern work.

His publications in the late 1800s were through Weldon & Company, a pattern company who produced hundreds of patterns and projects for numerous types of Victorian needlework. In about 1885, Weldon & Company started to publish monthly 14-page needlework newsletters, each covering one needlework technique. These were affordable, at 2 pence each. In 1888, the company began to collect these newsletters in groups of 12, publishing them a series of books entitled Weldon's Practical Needlework, each volume consisting of the various newsletters (one year of publications) bound together with a cloth cover and costing 2s. 6d.

Weldon's Ladies' Journal (1875–1954) supplied dressmaking patterns, and was a blueprint for subsequent 'home weeklies'.

In 1877 he was elected a Fellow of the Royal Society of Edinburgh. His proposers were Alexander Crum Brown, Sir James Dewar, John Hutton Balfour and Sir Andrew Douglas Maclagan. In 1882 he was further elected a Fellow of the Royal Society of London.

Weldon was interested in parapsychology, and was a spiritualist and a member of the Society for Psychical Research.

== Family ==
Weldon married Anne Cotton in 1854. Their second son was Walter Frank Raphael Weldon, an English evolutionary zoologist and biometrician.

== Chemistry ==
Weldon was a successful chemist and developed the Weldon process to produce chlorine by boiling hydrochloric acid with manganese dioxide. MnO_{2} was expensive, and Weldon created a process for its recycling by treating the manganese chloride produced with milk of lime and blowing air through the mixture to form a precipitate known as Weldon mud which was used to generate more chlorine. Manganese dioxide reacts with hydrochloric acid to form chlorine and Manganese chloride:

$$\mathrm{MnO_2 + 4 \ HCl \longrightarrow MnCl_2 + Cl_2 + 2 \ H_2O}$$

This was put into operation about 1869, and by 1875 it was being used by almost every chlorine manufacturer throughout Europe. He continued to work at the production of chlorine in connection with the processes of creating various sodium salts and became a leading authority on the subject. None of his later proposals met with equal success.

== Bibliography ==
- Weldon's Practical Needlework
  - Volume 1 - practical knitting, patchwork & crochet, stitches explained.
  - Volume 2 - stocking knitter, cross-stitch embroidery, crewel work, bazaar articles, knitting, crochet, smocking, appliqué work, netting, lace, crochet edgings, knitting edgings.
  - Volume 3 - lace shawls, crocheted evening bags using macramé cord (corday).
  - Volume 4 - knitting, crochet, Mountmellick embroidery, smocking, tatting, decorative needlework, beadwork, macramé lace.
  - Volume 5- knitting, Mountmellick, crochet, drawn thread work, netting.
  - Volume 6 - crochet, knitting, ivory embroidery, canvas embroidery, jewelled embroidery, patchwork, linen embroidery, Mountmellick embroidery, macramé lace
  - Volume 7 - crinkled paper work, knick-knacks, ivory embroidery, knitting, crochet, church embroidery, Mountmellick embroidery, Japanese curtain work.
  - Volume 8 - crochet, Hungarian embroidery, church decorations, crinkled paper work, Mountmellick embroidery, knitting, Bulgarian embroidery.
  - Volume 9 - plain needlework, stock knitting, Mountmellick embroidery, crinkled and crepe tissue paper work, knitting, monograms & initials.
  - Volume 10 - appliqué embroidery, crochet, knitting, leather work, pincushions, point lace, ribbon plaiting.
  - Volume 11 - bent iron work, crochet, knitting, macramé & bead work, point lace, stocking knitter, torchon lace.
  - Volume 12 - crochet & knitted waistcoats, drawn thread work, knitting, Mountmellick embroidery, smocking, stocking knitter.
