= Weldon Park Academy =

Defunct school in Ontario, Canada

Coordinates: 42.98378°N 81.25507°W

Information
- Established: 1995
- Closed: 2004

Weldon Park Academy was a private school located at 451 Ridout Street North in London, Ontario that closed down in 2004. The school offered students a contiguous education from Montessori Casa up to OAC and was a member of the Conference of Independent Schools.

Students were required to wear uniforms while at school. In Lower School, males wore grey pants, a dress shirt, and a red vest emblazoned with the school crest, while females wore a blouse and tunic. In Middle School, males added a school tie to their uniform, while females adopted a kilt with white shirt, red vest, and tie. In Upper School, males and females dropped the vest in favor of a blazer.

== History ==
The school was founded in April 1995 by a group of parents and business leaders from London, Ontario. The school was originally intended to be located at a library building at Weldon Park in Arva, Ontario, but on the day the school was to be first presented to the public, the school administration and the parents were informed that zoning bylaws would not permit a private school at that location.

The school was opened the next year in Spencer Lodge, a small building that was shared with the Scout Shop, but the school's original name of Weldon Park Academy was kept. With an initial enrollment of less than fifty students, the school was soon hailed as the fastest growing private school in Canada. The school was not without its problems: notable events that year included a structural fire and a flood that destroyed numerous books in basement-located class rooms.

In 1997, the school was no longer small enough to fit in Spencer Lodge, and it moved to the previous Graphics Building at the University of Western Ontario. After another three years, the school had outgrown that building as well, and the school moved into its final home of the renovated Labbatt Building, also the site of the first private school in London. This was a six-storey building that could more than hold the approximately 400 enrolled students; it also featured state-of-the-art science laboratories. The school benefitted from its close proximity to the London Regional Art and Historical Museum, where students took art lessons, and Harris Park, used for sports activities. In 2000, the school achieved its goal by finally became accredited with the International Baccalaureate Organization.

By 2001 a struggle between the Board of Governors and the Senior Administration of the school had fully developed. The Volunteer Board was pressing for an increased operational presence in the school. This push was in violation of established policies and was greatly opposed by the school administration.

The dispute between the Board and the Headmaster was further elevated when the Board of Governors insisted that, because of their volunteer positions, they should qualify for bursaries and scholarships in recognition of their service. One Board member insisted that as he was an original school founder, that his three children be given free tuition in perpetuity. This Board member's conflict of interest, coupled with the Headmaster's expulsion of a child of another Board member for a gross violation of the school code of conduct resulted in a governance battle between the Board and the Headmaster.

This was as a major turning point in the school's history and brought about a general lack of confidence as many of the students and teachers had known the Headmaster personally. The new Headmaster, Terry Clifford, was seen as cold to parents' and students' concerns, seeking mainly to employ his family members and his personal lawyers to senior administrative positions within the school. At the end of the academic year, the school refused to renew the contracts of many of the teachers, while others left voluntarily. In June 2003, the school shut down after a steady decline in enrolment from 574 students in 2000 to 140 in 2003.Enrollment plummeted as students lost teachers with whom they had grown up. The school went through a number of headmasters in the next couple of years, before closing in 2004 and transferring ownership of the building to Nancy Campbell Collegiate Institute, where a few of the teachers and students chose to continue.

Few, if any, of the founding students and teachers remained at the school; some of the students transferred to London Central Secondary School or other local schools, while others are now in university. Most of the teachers are teaching elsewhere or have retired.
