= Biological variation =

Biological variation may refer to:

- Genetic variation
- Phenotypic variation
- Population variance
- Human variability
- Biodiversity
- Variability in samples in laboratory medicine
