= R. W. Wheldon =

Prof Robert William Wheldon FRSE (1893–1954) was a 20th-century British agriculturalist and cattle-breeder. He was President of the English Jersey Cattle Society in the 1940s who named the Wheldon Memorial Trophy in his honour.

== Life ==
He was born on 17 January 1893 in or near Newcastle-upon-Tyne. He was educated there at the Rutherford College of Technology then studied at Newcastle University, graduating BSc in 1917. He began lecturing in Agriculture at King's College, Newcastle after graduation.

During the Second World War he advised on beef production.

In 1943 he was elected a Fellow of the Royal Society of Edinburgh. His proposers were John William Heslop-Harrison, Alfred Hobson, Sir Godfrey Thomson, and Max Born.

In 1947 he became Professor of Agriculture at Newcastle University which role he continued until death.

He died in Newcastle-upon-Tyne on 15 January 1954 aged 60, and was buried in Newbottle churchyard.

== Family ==
In 1920 he married Edith Majorie Tulloh.

They were parents to John Tulloh Wheldon, an anaesthetist, Peter Tulloh Wheldon and David Tulloh Wheldon.

== Publications ==
- Cross-Breeding of Cattle in Relation to Beef Production
