= Tim Wheldon =

English solicitor

Timothy John Wheldon (1959–2023) was an English solicitor.

== Biography ==
Born into a family with a history of whaling, Wheldon pursued a career in law, transitioning from a traditional family occupation to the legal profession. Educated at Woodleigh School and Hymers College, he qualified as a solicitor and joined the family law firm, Gosschalk Wheldon, which eventually became part of the international law firm Addleshaw Goddard.

Wheldon's legal career included significant work in private financing, particularly his involvement in the Royal Armouries project in Leeds. In 2002, he shifted his career focus to business, working with Malcolm Healey in e-commerce and life sciences investment. He returned to his law firm in Leeds in 2011, but a back injury led to his retirement in 2018. Wheldon then engaged in agriculture, specifically sheep farming.

Known for his jovial personality, Wheldon maintained a strong client base in Yorkshire. His legal work extended to the literary sector, notably in the discovery and preservation of audio recordings of poet Philip Larkin, which he later facilitated for public release.

Wheldon's approach to legal practice was marked by a blend of informality and assertiveness, as evidenced in his interactions with publisher Robert Maxwell. His personal style often deviated from traditional corporate norms, favoring casual attire over formal suits.

== Career ==
His personal life saw two marriages, both ending in divorce. He is survived by four children, who pursued careers outside the legal field.
