= Raphael Weldon =

British evolutionary biologist (1860–1906)

Walter Frank Raphael Weldon
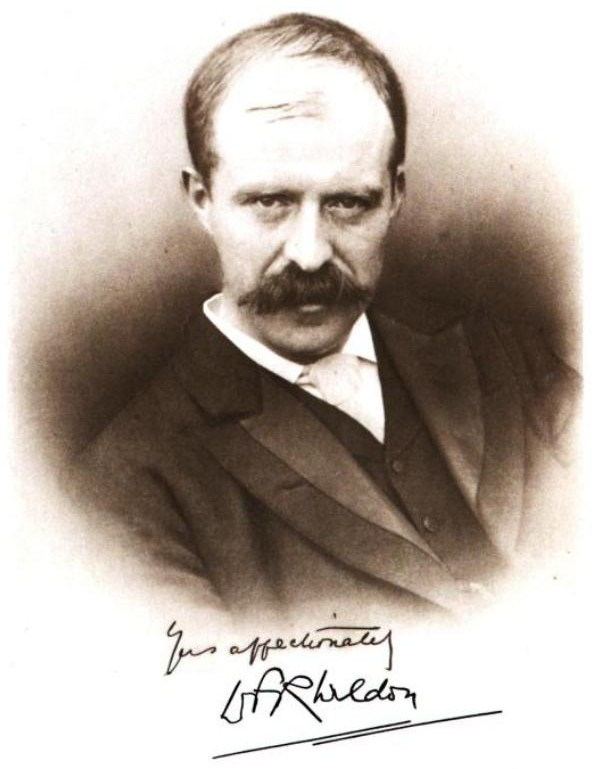
- Raphael Weldon
- Born: 15 March 1860; London, England
- Died: 13 April 1906 (aged 46); Oxford, England
- Education: St John's College, Cambridge
- Awards: Fellow of the Royal Society
- Scientific career
- Fields: Zoology, biometry
- Workplaces: St John's College, Cambridge; University College London; Oxford University
- Academic advisors: Francis Maitland Balfour

Walter Frank Raphael Weldon FRS (15 March 1860 – 13 April 1906), was an English evolutionary biologist and a founder of biometry. He was the joint founding editor of Biometrika, with Francis Galton and Karl Pearson.

== Family ==
Weldon was the second child of the journalist and industrial chemist, Walter Weldon, and his wife Anne Cotton. On 13 March 1883, Weldon married Florence Tebb (1858–1936), daughter of the social reformer William Tebb. Having studied mathematics at Girton College, Cambridge, Florence was to act as the 'computer' for Weldon's research into biological variation.

== Life and education ==
Medicine was his intended career and he spent the academic year 1876-1877 at University College London. Among his teachers were the zoologist E. Ray Lankester and the mathematician Olaus Henrici. In the following year he transferred to King's College London and then to St John's College, Cambridge in 1878.

There Weldon studied with the developmental morphologist Francis Balfour who influenced him greatly; Weldon gave up his plans for a career in medicine. In 1881 he gained a first-class honours degree in the Natural Science Tripos; in the autumn he left for the Naples Zoological Station to begin the first of his studies on marine biological organisms.

On his religious views, he considered himself an agnostic. He died in 1906 of acute pneumonia, and is buried at Holywell Church, Oxford.

== Career ==
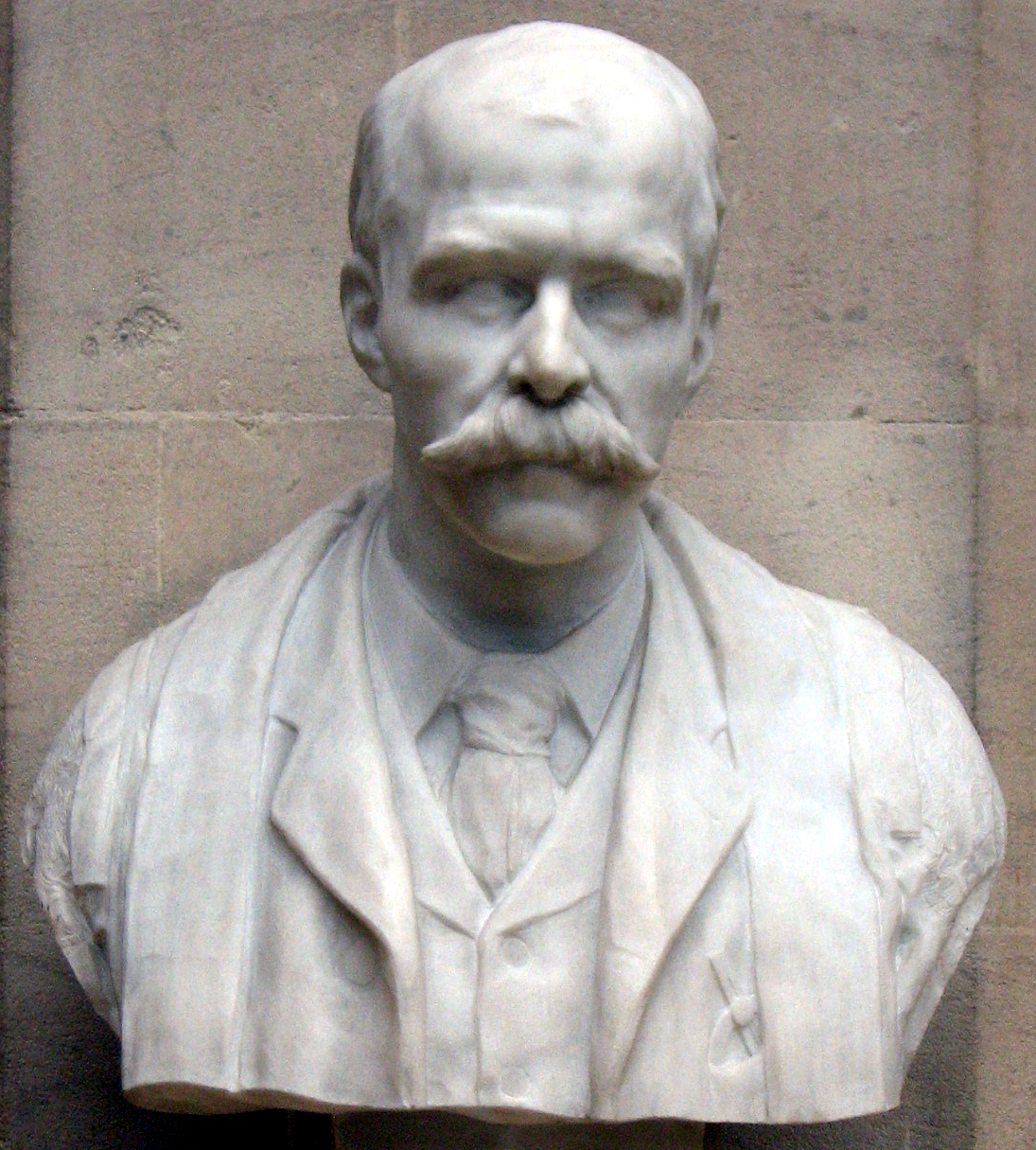
Bust in the Oxford University Museum

Upon returning to Cambridge in 1882, he was appointed university lecturer in Invertebrate Morphology. Weldon's work was centred on the development of a fuller understanding of marine biological phenomena and selective death rates of these organisms.

In 1889 Weldon succeeded Lankester in the Jodrell Chair of Zoology at University College London, and as curator of what is now the Grant Museum of Zoology, and was elected to the Royal Society in 1890. Royal Society records show his election supporters included the great zoologists of the day: Huxley, Lankester, Poulton, Newton, Flower, Romanes and others.

His interests were changing from morphology to problems in variation and organic correlation. He began using the statistical techniques that Francis Galton had developed for he had come to the view that "the problem of animal evolution is essentially a statistical problem." Weldon began working with his University College colleague, the mathematician Karl Pearson. Their partnership was very important to both men and survived Weldon's move to the Linacre Chair of Zoology at Oxford University in 1899. In the years of their collaboration Pearson laid the foundations of modern statistics. Magnello emphasises this side of Weldon's career. In 1900 he took the DSc degree and as Linacre Professor he also held a Fellowship at Merton College, Oxford.

Weldon was one of the first scientists to provide evidence of stabilizing and directional selection in natural populations.

By 1893 a Royal Society Committee included Weldon, Galton and Karl Pearson 'For the Purpose of conducting Statistical Enquiry into the Variability of Organisms'. In an 1894 paper Some remarks on variation in plants and animals arising from the work of the Royal Society Committee, Weldon wrote:

"... the questions raised by the Darwinian hypothesis are purely statistical, and the statistical method is the only one at present obvious by which that hypothesis can be experimentally checked."

In 1900 the work of Gregor Mendel was rediscovered and this precipitated a conflict between Weldon and Pearson on the one side and William Bateson on the other. Bateson, who had been taught by Weldon, took a very strong line against the biometricians. This bitter dispute ranged across substantive issues of the nature of evolution and methodological issues such as the value of the statistical method. Will Provine and Gregory Radick give detailed accounts of the controversy. The debate lost much of its intensity with the death of Weldon in 1906, though the general debate between the biometricians and the Mendelians continued until the creation of the modern evolutionary synthesis in the 1930s.

After his death, the Weldon Memorial Prize was established by the University of Oxford in his honour; it is awarded annually.

== Weldon's dice ==
In 1894, Weldon rolled a set of 12 dice 26,306 times. He collected the data in part, 'to judge whether the differences between a series of group frequencies and a theoretical law, taken as a whole, were or were not more than might be attributed to the chance fluctuations of random sampling.' Weldon's dice data were used by Karl Pearson in his pioneering paper on the chi-squared statistic.
