= Florence Weldon =

English mathematician (1858 – 1936)

Florence Joy Weldon (née Tebb, 1858 – 1936) was an English mathematician who worked as "one of the first college-educated human computers," analysing data about biological variation.

== Early life ==
Florence was the daughter of businessman and activist William Tebb. Her younger sister was physiologist Mary Tebb. In the early 1880s she studied mathematics at Girton College, Cambridge. She married evolutionary biologist Raphael Weldon in March 1883.

== Computation ==
Florence joined with Weldon's work on biological variation in shrimps and crabs. The pair travelled around England, Italy and the Bahamas, collecting about a thousand specimens at a time. Florence worked as Weldon's chief computer in analysing the data collected by measuring the specimens. With no calculating machines available, she used logarithms and Crelle tables. One study involved taking twenty-three measurements each from a thousand shore crab specimens from the Bay of Naples, which demonstrated that twenty-two of the features measured were normally distributed and the other was bimodal. Another study included taking measurements in duplicate from over eight thousand crabs.

Florence's contribution was acknowledged by her long-time friend and correspondent Karl Pearson, who completed her husband's manuscripts after his death.

== Art collection and legacy ==
In 1928, Florence received an honorary degree of Master of Arts from the University of Oxford after making a significant bequest of French paintings there. The Ashmolean Museum also contains a room named in her honour.

Florence died in 1936, leaving the residue of her estate to establish a Chair of Biometry at the University of London.
