= Welldon =

Welldon is a surname, and may refer to:

- Estela V. Welldon, consultant psychiatrist in forensic psychotherapy
- James Welldon (1854–1937), English clergyman, Bishop of Calcutta
- James Welldon (cricketer) (1847–1927), English cricketer

== See also ==
- Weldon (surname)
