= Weldon process =

The Weldon process is a process developed in 1866 by Walter Weldon for recovering manganese dioxide for re-use in chlorine manufacture. Commercial operations started at the Gamble works in St. Helens in 1869. The process is described in considerable detail in the book, The Alkali Industry, by J.R. Partington, D.Sc.

The common method to manufacture chlorine at the time, was to react manganese dioxide (and related oxides) with hydrochloric acid to give chlorine:

MnO_{2} + 4 HCl → MnCl_{2} + Cl_{2} + 2H_{2}O

Weldon's contribution was to develop a process to recycle the manganese. The waste manganese(II) chloride solution is treated with lime, steam and oxygen, producing calcium manganite(IV):

2 MnCl_{2} + 3 Ca(OH)_{2} + O_{2} → CaO·2MnO_{2} + 3 H_{2}O + 2 CaCl_{2}

The resulting calcium manganite can be reacted with HCl as in related processes:

CaO·2MnO_{2} + 10 HCl → CaCl_{2} + 2 MnCl_{2} + 2 Cl_{2} + 5 H_{2}O

The manganese(II) chloride can be recycled, while the calcium chloride is a waste byproduct.

The Weldon process was first replaced by the Deacon process and later by the Chloralkali process.
