= Vince Weldon =

American aerospace engineer

Vincent A. Weldon is an American aerospace engineer who has designed critical components for both the Apollo Moon missions and the Space Shuttle. In 2006 Weldon called the Boeing 787 Dreamliner unsafe, and Boeing fired Weldon under disputed circumstances.

== Aerospace career ==
Weldon joined Boeing in 1960, beginning a 46-year career with the firm. He was first involved with the wing design of the Boeing 727 airliner, a design that incorporated high-lift devices such as triple-slotted flaps, which enabled the 727 to be one of the first jet aircraft capable of operating from relatively short runways.

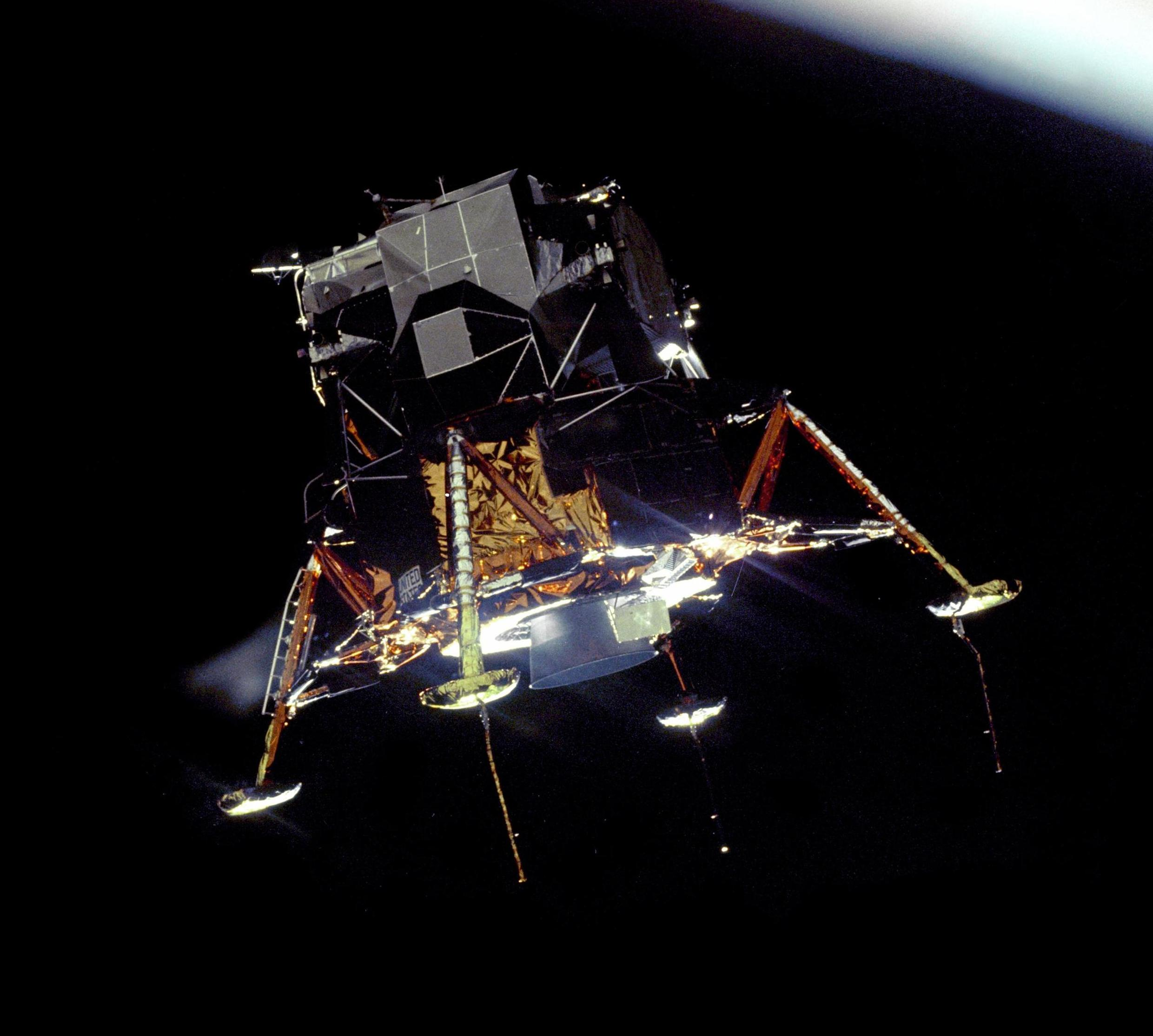
The Apollo 11 Lunar Module Eagle in lunar orbit.

In mid-1962, Weldon was assigned to the Apollo program, where he designed the support and release system for the Lunar Module. He was also tasked to design a new thrust structure for the Apollo Service module's main engine, which would be 100% stiffer, yet not increase the weight of the Service module. Weight was critical, to allow the unit to be carried aboard the Saturn V launch vehicle.

In the 1970s, he led the design team at Boeing's space research facility in Kent, Washington, responsible for creating complex components of the Space Shuttle. Weldon was made Contractor Preliminary Design Review (PDR) Team Leader for the Space Shuttle orbiter Aft Fuselage. He was a pioneer in the use of advanced composite materials in aerospace design, and the Orbiter was one of the first composite (Titanium/ Boron Epoxy) reusable aerospace major primary structure applications.

While working in collaboration with the RAND workshop, it was Weldon's research that showed titanium would be better than Inconel as a honeycomb structural material for building metallic Trans-Atmospheric Vehicles (TAVs) and X-33 spacecraft. Later, Weldon became the Senior Aerospace Engineer at Boeing Phantom Works research center.

== Safety claims ==
Vince Weldon's experience in the use of composite materials led to him being asked by Boeing to research how advanced composites could be used to build its next generation passenger airliner, the 787 Dreamliner. Weldon told Boeing management that the carbon fiber-reinforced plastic material which was being used to construct the Boeing 787 Dreamliner was unsafe, less safe than a conventional aluminium aircraft, and that in the event of a crash the composite fuselage would "shatter too easily and burn with toxic fumes". Boeing fired Weldon in July 2006.

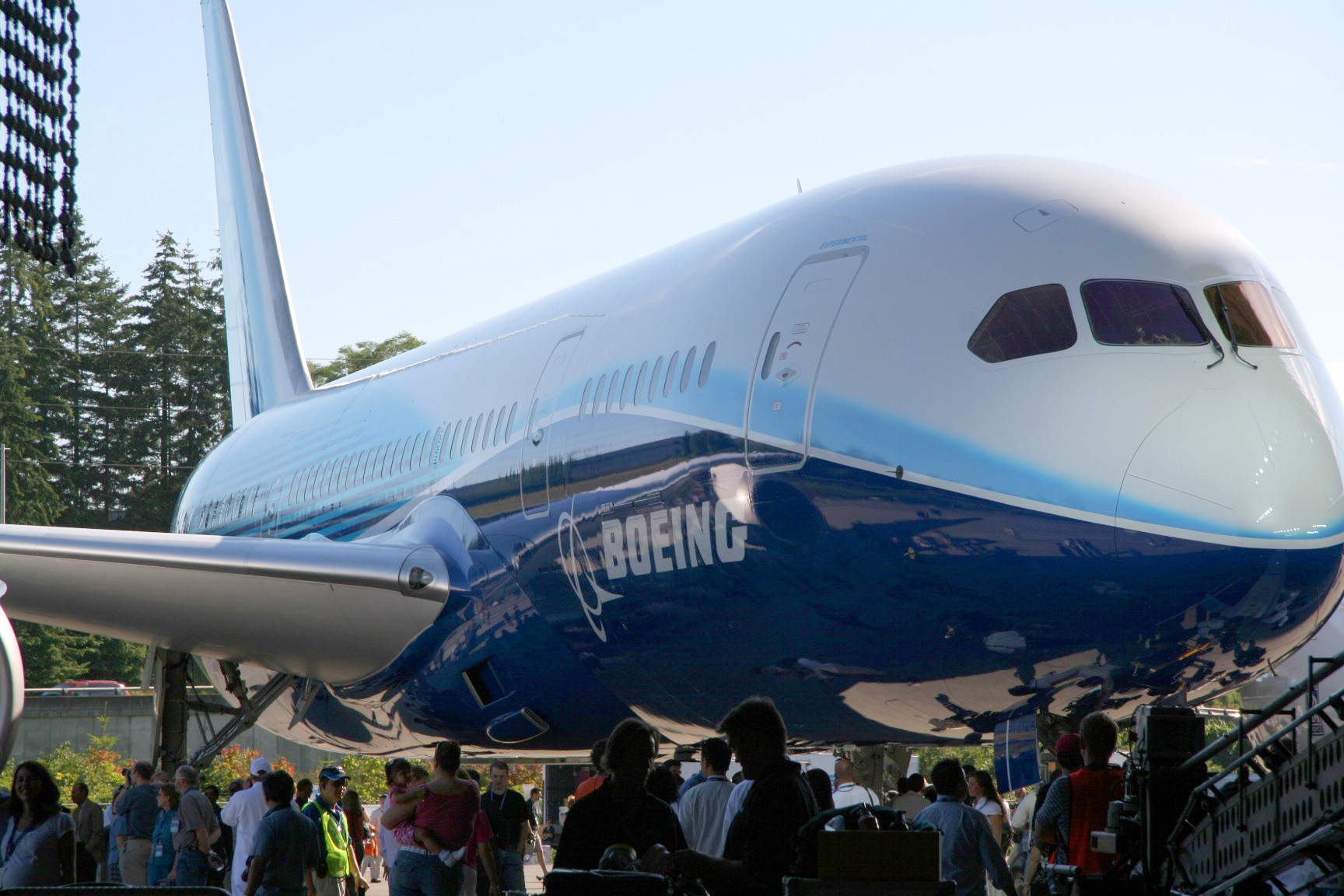
The Boeing 787 Dreamliner, the world's first composite airliner.

Weldon detailed his concerns about the 787 airliner in a letter he wrote to the Federal Aviation Administration (FAA). He also criticised the FAA's guidelines for composite airliners, saying they do not go far enough to guarantee passenger safety on the 787.

He filed a whistleblower complaint with the U.S. Occupational Safety and Health Administration (OSHA), claiming his sacking was in "retaliation for raising concerns throughout the last two years of his employment about the crashworthiness of the 787". Boeing rejected Weldon's claims that the 787 airliner was unsafe, and told the OSHA that Weldon was sacked because he threatened a supervisor. The OSHA denied Weldon whistleblower status under the Whistleblower Protection Act, "largely on the grounds that Boeing's 787 design does not violate any FAA regulations or standards."

In 2007, a HDNet television documentary titled Plastic Planes, hosted by veteran newscaster Dan Rather, was broadcast in the United States, featuring Weldon's claims about safety issues with the Boeing 787.
