= Thomas King Weldon =

New Zealand police officer (1826–1894)

Thomas King Weldon (1826–1894) was a New Zealand police officer. He was born in Cork, County Cork, Ireland or in Carrick-on-Shannon, County Leitrim, Ireland in about 1826.
