= Ministry of Education (United Kingdom) =

British ministry responsible for education

The Ministry of Education (1944–1964) was a central government department governed by the Minister of Education, with responsibility in England and Wales for:

1. Promoting the education of people;
2. Developing educational institutions;
3. Developing policy to provide a comprehensive educational service;
4. Securing the effective execution of the education policy by local education authorities

The Ministry of Education was created by the Education Act 1944.

Scottish education was subject to the Education (Scotland) Act 1945 (8 & 9 Geo. 6. c. 37) whereby the Scottish Office, under the Secretary of State for Scotland, undertook similar responsibilities to the Ministry of Education but for Scotland.

Northern Irish education was subject to the Education Act (Northern Ireland) 1947, passed by the Northern Ireland parliament at Stormont, which provided powers to the Minister of Education to:

- appoint members of the Northern Ireland Advisory Council for Education
- appoint additional members of education committees for Northern Ireland local education authorities

== History ==
The Ministry of Education was created by the Education Act 1944 and was preceded by the Board of Education, which had been created by the Board of Education Act 1899. The Ministry of Education lasted twenty years until 1964, when it was merged with the Ministry of Science to create the Department of Education and Science. This reorganisation followed the recommendations of the Robbins Committee on Higher Education.

== Ministers ==
The Minister of Education was in charge of the Ministry of Education and was in effect a corporation sole. The following members of Parliament or members of the House of Lords have held the office: -

Colour key (for political parties):
Conservative Labour

Name	Portrait	Term of office		Length of term	Party	Prime Minister
R. A. Butler		3 August 1944	25 May 1945	9 months and 22 days	Conservative	Winston Churchill (War Coalition)
Richard Law		25 May 1945	26 July 1945	2 months and 1 day	Conservative	Winston Churchill (Caretaker Min.)
Ellen Wilkinson		3 August 1945	6 February 1947 (died in office)	1 year, 6 months and 3 days	Labour	Clement Attlee
George Tomlinson		10 February 1947	26 October 1951	4 years, 8 months and 16 days	Labour	Clement Attlee
Florence Horsbrugh		2 November 1951	18 October 1954	2 years, 11 months and 16 days	Conservative	Sir Winston Churchill
David Eccles		18 October 1954	13 January 1957	2 years, 2 months and 26 days	Conservative	Sir Winston Churchill
David Eccles		18 October 1954	13 January 1957	2 years, 2 months and 26 days	Conservative	Sir Anthony Eden
The Viscount Hailsham		13 January 1957	17 September 1957	8 months and 4 days	Conservative	Harold Macmillan
Geoffrey Lloyd		17 September 1957	14 October 1959	2 years and 27 days	Conservative	Harold Macmillan
David Eccles		14 October 1959	13 July 1962	2 years, 8 months and 29 days	Conservative	Harold Macmillan
Sir Edward Boyle, Bt		13 July 1962	1 April 1964	1 year, 8 months and 19 days	Conservative	Harold Macmillan
Sir Edward Boyle, Bt		13 July 1962	1 April 1964	1 year, 8 months and 19 days	Conservative	Sir Alec Douglas-Home

== Parliamentary Secretaries ==
The Minister of Education could appoint a Parliamentary Secretary who was the junior minister in the Ministry of Education albeit still a political appointment. The following members of Parliament have held the office: -

Colour key (for political parties):
Conservative Labour

Name	Portrait	Term of office		Length of term	Party	Minister of Education
James Chuter Ede		13 August 1944	23 May 1945	9 months and 10 days	Labour	R. A. Butler
Thelma Cazalet-Keir		26 May 1945	26 July 1945	2 months and 1 day	Conservative	Richard Law
Arthur Jenkins		4 August 1945	30 October 1945	2 months and 27 days	Labour	Ellen Wilkinson
David Hardman		30 October 1945	26 October 1951	5 years, 11 months and 26 days	Labour	Ellen Wilkinson
David Hardman		30 October 1945	26 October 1951	5 years, 11 months and 26 days	Labour	George Tomlinson
Kenneth Pickthorn		5 November 1951	18 October 1954	2 years, 11 months and 13 days	Conservative	Florence Horsbrugh
Dennis Vosper		18 October 1954	13 January 1957	2 years, 2 months and 26 days	Conservative	David Eccles
Sir Edward Boyle		18 January 1957	14 October 1959	8 months and 26 days	Conservative	The Viscount Hailsham
Sir Edward Boyle		18 January 1957	14 October 1959	8 months and 26 days	Conservative	Geoffrey Lloyd
Kenneth Thompson		22 October 1959	13 July 1962	2 years, 8 months and 21 days	Conservative	David Eccles
Christopher Chataway		16 July 1962	1 April 1964	1 year, 8 months and 16 days	Conservative	Sir Edward Boyle, Bt

== Civil Service ==
The administration of the Ministry of Education was undertaken by the civil service under the leadership of the Permanent Secretary of Education.

Name	Term of office	
Sir Maurice G. Holmes, G.B.E., K.C.B.	1944	1945
Lord Redcliffe-Maud, G.C.B., C.B.E.	1945	1952
Sir Gilbert N. Flemming, K.C.B.	1952	1959
Dame Mary Smieton, D.B.E.	1959	1963
Sir G. Herbert Andrew, K.C.M.G., C.B.	1963	1964

== Organisation ==
The Ministry of Education was organised into branches which were constantly re-organised over the twenty years of the ministry, but the following list is of the branches which have existed at one time or another: -

Branch	Responsibility for
Teachers Branch	Teacher recruitment (including qualification criteria & entrance exams) and teacher training through specialist teacher training colleges ensuring an adequate supply of teachers.
Medical Branch	School clinics & nurses for medical treatment of children and provision of school meals and milk for those in nutritional need
Special Services Branch	Special education services for blind, deaf, handicapped (physical & mental), epileptic, maladjusted and delicate children
Information Branch	Distribution of information to educators, institutions and local education authorities through means such as circulars and memorandum
External Relations Branch	Distribution of information to the general public including films, exhibitions at conferences, liaising with the press, publications and ministerial briefings for announcements in parliament & press interviews.
Further Education Branch	Provision of further education including evening institutes, juvenile instruction centres, short courses, books needed at public libraries, residential colleges, polytechnics, vocational courses, agricultural colleges, sports, arts etc. etc. This branch was later sub-divided into the University Branch and Adult Education and Youth services Branches
Finance Branch	Expenditure, accountancy & budget estimates which gave the branch considerable influence over the formulation and execution of policy
Schools Branch	Interpretation of the Education Act 1944 was subject to 'precedents' from a body of knowledge and previous decisions by at least Assistant Secretary or the Legal Branch.
Architects and Building Branch	Building of school & educational institute premises including policy, building regulations, internal fittings, planning requirements, equipment etc.
Awards Branch	For aid and grants to students through state scholarships and local education authority awards. Financial assistance was extended to those in universities, with particular emphasis on scientific scholarships.
Inspectorate	Separate inspectorates existed for England and Wales. The inspectorate carried out compulsory inspections of schools and educational institutes and reported deficiencies requiring remediation. In addition policy was reviewed & revised through panels from reports and surveys from the inspectorate.
Welsh Department	Special considerations for Welsh schools including the Welsh language and low population rural schools
Legal Branch	Decisions on how acts of parliament should be interpreted. This is for uncertain cases, whereas the Schools Branch deflected cases where a precedent already existed. Legal opinions were given by the Law Officers of the Crown ( Attorney General and the Solicitor General) in response to enquiries concerning points of law.
UNESCO Branch	Engagement with United Nations Educational, Scientific and Cultural Organisation (UNESCO)
Salaries Branch	Salary scales for teachers
Establishments Branch	Ministry of Education staff and Inspectorate concerning changes in office procedure or organization, promotions, allowances and formation of new committees. Effectively equivalent to a modern day HR department
Statistics Branch	The collection and presentation of statistics such as the level of supply of teachers, appraising shortages of, for example, science and technology graduates, numbers of immigrant pupils etc.
Research and Intelligence Branch	Keeping ministers informed of educational research and identified areas of promise. It grant-aided and commissioned research from universities using a fund but did not undertake any research itself. Additional funds were set aside for bodies such as the Central Advisory Councils for Education in England and Wales, the National Foundation for Educational Research, the Curriculum Study Group and, initially, the Schools Council.

== Central Advisory Councils for Education ==
The Education Act 1944 set-up two Central Advisory Councils for Education, one for England and one for Wales. The Minister of Education appointed the members of each council which were mainly made-up of: -

- Senior and experienced educators in the public education system (e.g. a senior experienced & highly qualified nursery nurse)
- Scholars in the theories of learning who were often university professors

The Ministry of Education provided secretaries to the councils and funded their time, the Minister appointed the chairmen of the councils.

The councils advised the minister on questions raised by the minister or issues identified by the councils.

The advice was either made public through published reports or kept confidentially within the ministry.

== See also ==
- Education
- Career and technical education
