= Marxist literary criticism =

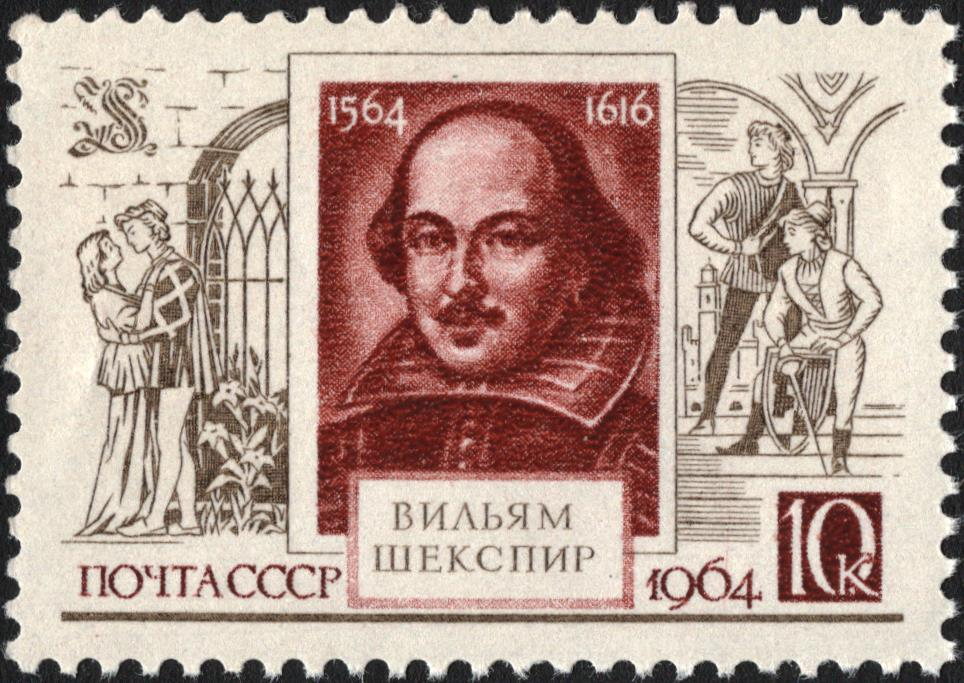
Soviet World Cultural Figures stamp of William Shakespeare, 1964

Marxist literary criticism is a theory of literary criticism based on the historical materialism developed by philosopher and economist Karl Marx. Marxist critics argue that even art and literature themselves form social institutions and have specific ideological functions, based on the background and ideology of their authors. The English literary critic and cultural theorist Terry Eagleton defines Marxist criticism this way "Marxist criticism is not merely a 'sociology of literature', concerned with how novels get published and whether they mention the working class. It aims to explain the literary work more fully; and this means a sensitive attention to its forms, styles, and meanings. But it also means grasping those forms, styles and meanings as the product of a particular history." In Marxist criticism, class struggle and relations of production are the central instruments in analysis.

Most Marxist critics who were writing in what could chronologically be specified as the early period of Marxist literary criticism, subscribed to what has come to be called "vulgar Marxism". In this thinking of the structure of societies, literary texts are one register of the superstructure, which is determined by the economic base of any given society. Therefore, literary texts reflect the economic base rather than "the social institutions from which they originate" for all social institutions, or more precisely human–social relationships, are in the final analysis determined by the economic base.

== History ==
Karl Marx's studies have provided a basis for much in socialist theory and research. Marxism aims to revolutionize the concept of work through creating a classless society built on control and ownership of the means of production. In such a society, the means of production (the base in the architectural metaphor Marx uses to analyze and describe the structure of any given society in written human history) are possessed in common by all people rather than being owned by an elite ruling class. Marx believed that economic determinism, dialectical materialism and class struggle were the three principles that explained his theories. (Though Marx does attribute a teleological function to the economic, he is no determinist. As he and Friedrich Engels write in The Communist Manifesto, the class struggle in its capitalist phase could well end "in the common ruin of the contending classes," and as Terry Eagleton argues in Why Marx Was Right, "Capitalism can be used to build socialism, but there is no sense in which the whole historical process is secretly laboring towards this goal.") The bourgeoisie (dominant class who control and own the means of production) and the proletariat (subordinate class: ones who do not own and control the means of production) were the only two classes who engaged in hostile interaction to achieve class consciousness. (In Marx's thought, it is only the proletariat, the working class, that must achieve class consciousness. The bourgeoisie is already quite well aware of its position and power in the capitalist paradigm. As individuals, workers know that they are being exploited in order to produce surplus value, the value produced by the worker that the capitalists appropriate; however, the working class must realize that they are being exploited not only as individuals but as a class. It is upon this realization that the working class reaches class consciousness). Marx believed that all history is a struggle between hostile and competing economic classes in a state of change. Marx and Engels collaborated to produce a range of publications based on capitalism, class struggles, and socialist movements.

These theories and ideologies can be found within three published works:

- The Communist Manifesto (1848)
- Preface to the Contribution to the Critique of Political Economy (1859)
- Das Kapital or Capital (1867)

The core publication of the movement, the Communist Manifesto (1848), argues that 'the history of all hitherto existing societies is the history of class struggles'. As class struggle is the engine room of history, to understand the course of history, one must analyse the class relations that typify different historical epochs, the antagonisms, and forms of class struggle embodied in such class relations. This involves the development of class consciousness and follows the revolutionary movements that challenge the dominant classes. It extends to rating the success of these revolutions in developing new modes of production and forms of social organization.

In contrast to the Manifesto, Preface to the Contribution to the Critique of Political Economy (1859) and Capital (1867) focus on the unfolding logic of a system, rather than class struggle. These provide an alternative account of historical development and emphasize the self-destructive contradictions and law of motion of specific modes of production. Preface argues that society's economic organization consists of a distinctive pattern of forces and relations of production. From this foundation arises a complex political and ideological superstructure, where economic development impacts societal progress.

Capital was more concerned with the genesis and dynamic of capitalism. As Mclellan (1971) states, "it refers to class struggle mainly in the context of the struggle between capital and labor, within capitalism, rather than over its suppression." Capital was less concerned with forecasting how capitalism would be overthrown, than considering how it had developed and how it functioned. The key to understanding this logic was the 'commodity form of social relations – a form that was most fully developed only in capitalism.

== Ideologies ==
It is through the theories of class struggle, politics, and economics that Marxist literary criticism emerged. The thought behind Marxist criticism is that works of literature are mere products of history that can be analyzed by looking at the social and material conditions in which they were constructed. Marx's Capital states that "the mode of production of material life determines altogether the social, political, and intellectual life process. It is not the consciousness of men that determines their being, but on the contrary their social being, that determines their consciousness." Put simply, the social situation of the author determines the types of characters that will develop, the political ideas displayed and the economical statements developed in the text.

== The development of Marxist criticism ==
Although Marx and Engels detailed theories of socialism in the mid-nineteenth century, it was not until the 1920s that Marxist literary theory was systematized. The greatest impetus for this standardization came after the October Revolution of 1917 in Russia. The event instigated a change in belief around socialist ideals in government and society. While these ideals developed, socialist realism was accepted as the highest form of literature – a theory based on an art movement that depicted and glorified the proletariat's struggle towards societal progress. These ideas guided both literary creation and official literary criticism in the Soviet Union, where works focused on the lives of the different classes. In the years since then, the beliefs of some Marxist schools regarding literary theory have been modified to acknowledge that literary creation is a result of both subjective inspiration and the objective influence of the writer's surroundings. This system of belief relies on the social classes as well as the economic and political development of society. Thus, Marx's theories intertwined with the emerging ideologies of the new Russian movement and spread throughout the world.

== Critiquing literary works through Marxist lens ==
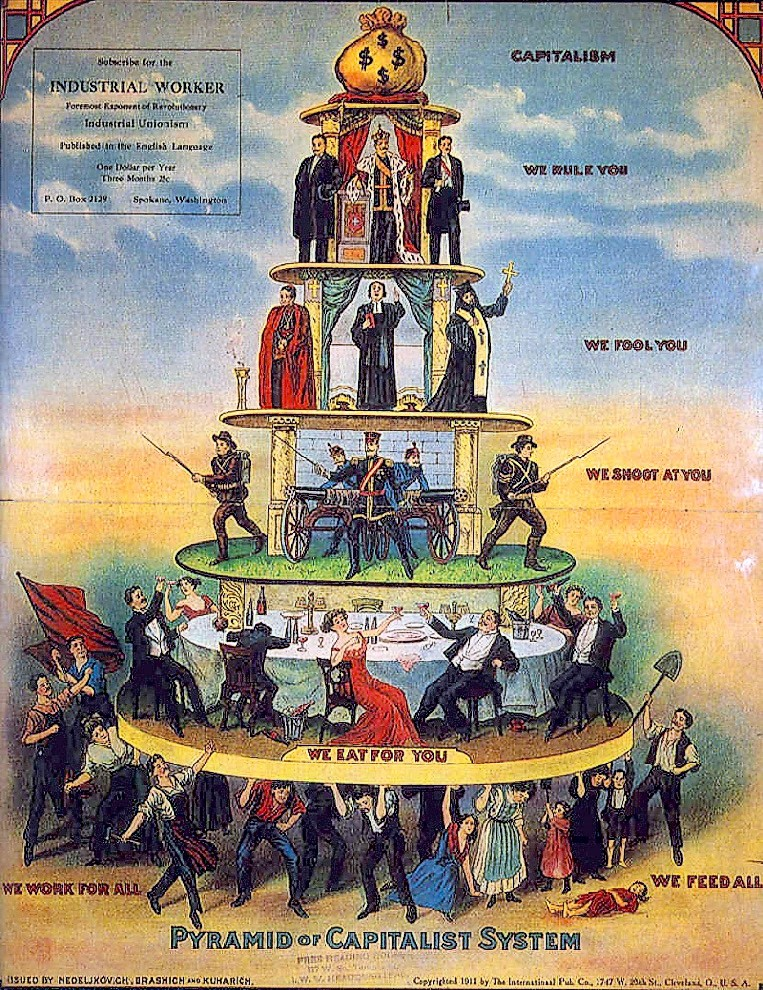
Pyramid of Capitalist System, a 1911 American caricature which originated from a Russian flyer of c. 1901

=== Criteria ===
The viewpoint of Marxists toward literary works is that they are not "works created according to a perpetual artistic standard, but as "consequences" of economic and ideological factors that are specific to that time period". Critiquing literary work in the perspective of a Marxist involves asking these questions:

- What is the role of class in the said literary work?
- How do the protagonists/characters fight against oppression?
- Does the work advocate for Marxist values (whether implicitly or explicitly) or does the work oppose them?
- How is oppression discussed by the work; are impeding issues in society brushed aside or are they condemned elsewhere?
- Are there any proposed idealistic answers to the issues faced in the literary work?

Ultimately, the core foundation of Marxist critique is established on these questions since Marx once said that "the writer may very well serve a movement of history as its mouthpiece, but he cannot of course create it".

=== Application of criteria ===
"Karl Marx's sociological explanation of social conflict is one of the most powerful explanations, he has put forward that the notion of a class struggle between the proletariat and the bourgeoisie, is inevitable within a capitalist system. The brewing social conflict amongst classes is well represented within Lu Xun's An Incident, where Xun describes his "ill tempered" experience within the capital Peking (pinyin Beijing) during the winter of 1917; he begins by talking about how an old woman who is dressed in "ragged clothing" got caught in the shaft due to the strong winds "fluttering" her "unbuttoned and tattered jacket". Xun describes how he felt "disgusted" and in disbelief that the old woman who was lying on the ground was helped by the rickshaw man; he believed that the old woman was "acting injured" to gain sympathy and help from the rickshaw man. Towards the end of the incident, in an attempt to quench his feelings of shame and guilt, he gives the policeman a "handful of coppers" to be given to the rickshaw man as a form of "reward" for his Samaritan behavior. Xun's attitude towards the old woman and the rickshaw man is representative of the classist bourgeois view towards the proletariat who are the "old woman and the rickshaw man" in this case; an apathetic and selfish attitude towards people in distress.

== See also ==
- Literary criticism
- Marxist aesthetics
- Literature and Revolution
