= Sally Ledger =

British academic (1961–2009)

- Born: 14 December 1961; East Grinstead, West Sussex
- Died: 21 January 2009 (aged 47); Letchworth, Hertfordshire
- Political party: Labour Party
- Spouse: Jim Porteous
- Children: Richard Porteous

Academic background
- Education: Queen Mary University of London (BA); Wadham College, Oxford (PhD)
- Doctoral advisor: Terry Eagleton

Academic work
- Discipline: English Literature
- Sub-discipline: Victorian literature
- Institutions: Royal Holloway, University of London; University of Exeter; Cheltenham & Gloucester College of Higher Education; University of the West of England; Birkbeck, University of London
- Notable works: The New Woman: Fiction and Feminism at the Fin de Siècle (1997); Dickens and the Popular Radical Imagination (2007)

Sally Ledger (14 December 1961 – 21 January 2009) was a British academic, who was a Professor of Victorian literature and made major contributions to the fields of nineteenth-century women’s writing, literary feminism, and the study of Charles Dickens.

Ledger took her undergraduate studies at Queen Mary University of London, where she won the George Smith Prize for the best English First in the University of London in 1985. She completed her graduate studies at the University of Oxford, where she worked on the novels of Mark Rutherford under the supervision of Terry Eagleton at Wadham College. While at Oxford she was involved with the student pressure group Oxford English Limited, and wrote for its journal News from Nowhere: Journal of the Oxford English Faculty Opposition; she also contributed to the journal Literature Teaching Politics, where her first published article appeared in 1987.

After her doctorate, Ledger had lectureships at Royal Holloway University of London, the University of Exeter and the University of the West of England, before moving to Birkbeck University of London in 1995 as a Lecturer in English. She was promoted to Reader in 2001 and Professor in 2006. Ledger moved to Royal Holloway University of London in 2008 to take up the Hildred Carlile Chair of English.

Ledger’s major publications are The New Woman: Fiction and Feminism at the Fin de Siècle (Manchester University Press, 1997) and Dickens and the Popular Radical Imagination (Cambridge University Press, 2007). She also wrote a study of Henrik Ibsen for Northcote House's 'Writers and Their Work' series (1999), and co-edited a series of volumes: Political Gender: Texts and Contexts (Routledge, 1994), Cultural Politics at the Fin de Siècle (Cambridge University Press, 1995), The Fin de Siècle: A Reader in Cultural History (Oxford University Press, 2000) and the posthumously published Charles Dickens in Context (Cambridge University Press, 2013). She also edited George Egerton’s Keynotes and Discords (Bloomsbury Academic, 2000). From 2005 to 2009, she was an integral part of the Dickens Project conference at the University of California, Santa Cruz and was planning a book on the origins of Victorian sentimentality at the time of her death. The British Association of Victorian Studies inaugurated the Sally Ledger Memorial Bursary fund for postgraduate students in her honour.

== Obituaries ==
- Tom Healy, The Guardian, 28 January 2009
- Matthew Reisz, Times Higher Education, 5 February 2009
- Roger Luckhurst, The Independent, 7 February 2009
