= OEL =

OEL may refer to:

- Organic Electro-Luminescence
- Original English-language manga
- Oracle Enterprise Linux, former name for Oracle Linux
- Occupational exposure limit
- Oxford English Limited
- Oliver Ekman-Larsson (born 1991), Swedish professional ice hockey player
