= David Hawkes (professor of English) =

David Hawkes (b 1964; Wales) is a professor of English Literature at Arizona State University, Tempe, in the U.S. state of Arizona. He is the author of seven books and the editor of four.

== Education and academia ==
Hawkes attended Stanwell Comprehensive School near Cardiff, Wales. He won a College Scholarship to Oxford University (B.A. 1986), and later the Marjorie Hope Nicolson fellowship to Columbia University (M.A. 1988, M.Phil. 1990, Ph.D. 1992). At Oxford, Hawkes was a student of the left-wing literary critic Terry Eagleton, and an activist in the socialist-feminist group of scholars Oxford English Limited. At Columbia he worked with the Palestinian critic Edward Said, and contributed to various alternative and underground journals on the Lower East Side. Between 1991 and 2007 Hawkes was first assistant professor, then associate professor of English Literature at Lehigh University, and he has been a full professor of English Literature at Arizona State University since 2007. He has held visiting appointments at Jadavpur University, Kolkata (2008), Boğaziçi University, Istanbul (2010) and North China Electric Power University, Beijing (2015, 2016, 2018). He received a year-long fellowship from the National Endowment for the Humanities at the Folger Shakespeare Library (2002–03), and the William Ringler Fellowship at the Huntington Library (2006).

== Published books ==
- Hawkes, David (ed.), Money and Magic in Early Modern Drama (Bloomsbury, 2022) ISBN 9781350247079
- Hawkes, David, The Reign of Anti-logos: Performance in Postmodernity (Palgrave, 2020) ISBN 3030559394
- Hawkes, David, Shakespeare and Economic Criticism (Bloomsbury, 2015) ISBN 1472576977
- Hawkes, David (ed. with Richard Newhauser), The Book of Nature and Humanity (Brepols, 2013) ISBN 9782503549217
- Hawkes, David, The Culture of Usury in Renaissance England (Palgrave, 2010) ISBN 0230616267
- Hawkes, David, John Milton: A Hero of Our Time (Counterpoint, 2009) ISBN 1582434379
- Hawkes, David, The Faust Myth: Religion and the Rise of Representation (Palgrave, 2007) ISBN 1403975590
- Hawkes, David (ed.), John Bunyan's The Pilgrim's Progress (Barnes and Noble, 2005) ISBN 9781593082543
- Hawkes, David (ed.), John Milton's Paradise Lost (Barnes and Noble, 2004) ISBN 1593080956
- Hawkes, David, Idols of the Marketplace: Idolatry and Commodity Fetishism in English Literature (Palgrave, 2001) ISBN 0312240074
- Hawkes, David, Ideology (Routledge, 1996, Revised second edition, 2003; Korean translation, 2001; Vietnamese translation, 2022) ISBN 0415290120
