= News from Nowhere (disambiguation) =

News from Nowhere is an 1890 book by William Morris.

News from Nowhere may also refer to:

- News from Nowhere (Air Supply album), 1995
- News from Nowhere (bookshop) in Liverpool, UK
- News from Nowhere (Darkstar album), 2013
- News from Nowhere: Journal of the Oxford English Faculty Opposition, magazine
- The News from Nowhere, a 2014 album by The Hoosiers
- News from Nowhere. Television and the News, a 1973 book by Edward Jay Epstein
- News from Nowhere, a 1986 novel by David Caute
- News from Nowhere, a 2010 movie directed by Paul Morrissey

== See also ==
- "More News from Nowhere", a 2008 single by Nick Cave and the Bad Seeds
