= Osama Manzlaji =

Syrian translator (born 1948)

Osama Manzlaji is a Syrian translator. He was born in Latakia in 1948. He translated many literary works from the English language. Some of the most known writers whom he's translated for are Henry Miller, Hermann Hesse, and Terry Eagleton.

== Education ==
He got his Licentiate from the English language and literature department in Damascus in 1975.

== Translations ==
- (Black Spring) Novel. Written by: Henry Miller. Published in 1980.
- (Dubliners) Novel. Written by: James Joyce. Published in 1914.
- (Winesburg, Ohio). Written by: Sherwood Anderson. Published in 1985.
- (The colossus of Maroussi). Written by: Henry Miller. Published in 1987.
- (Narcissus and Goldmund) Novel. Written by: Hermann Hesse. First Edition was published in 1996.
- (Tropic of Capricorn) Novel. Written by: Henry Miller. Published in 1996.
- (Topic of Cancer) Novel. Written by: Henry Miller. Published in 1997.
- (Steppenwolf) Novel. Written by: Herman Hesse. Published in 1997.
- (Gertrud) Novel. Written by: Herman Hesse. Published in 1997.
- (Rosshalde) Novel. Written by: Herman Hesse. Published in 1997.
- (Beneath the Wheel). Written by: Herman Hesse. Published in 1998.
- (Peter Camenzind) Novel. Written by: Herman Hesse. Published in 1999.
- (The Last Temptation of Christ) Novel. Written by: Nikos Kazantzakis. Published in 2001.
- (The Honorary Consul) Novel. Written by: Graham Greene. Published in 2002.
- (Sexus: The Rosy Crucifixion 1). Written by: Henry Miller. Published in 2002.
- (Plexus: The Rosy Crucifixion 2) Novel. Written by: Henry Miller. Published in 2002.
- (Disgrace) Novel. Written by: J.M. Coetzee. Published in 2002.
- (Nexus: The Rosy Curcifixion 3) Novel. Written by: Henry Miller. Published in 2004.
- (City and the Pillar) Novel. Written by: Gore Vidal. Published in 2005.
- (The Roman Spring of Mrs. Stone) Novel. Written by: Tennessee Williams. Published in 2005.
- (Wandlungen (Changing)) autobiography. Written by: Liv Ullmann. Published in 2006.
- (Funeral Rites) Novel. Written by: Jean Genet. Published in 2006.
- (Tennessee Williams Notebooks). Written by: Tennessee Williams. Published in 2006.
- (A Handful of Dust). Written by: Evelyn Waugh. Published in 2007.
- (Julian). Written by: Gore Vidal.
- (Amesterdam) Novel. Written by: Ian McEwan. Published in 2007.
- (Mother Ireland). Written by: Edna O’Brien. Published in 2008.
- (Drown) Short Story Collection. Written by: Junot Diaz. Published in 2009.
- (The Books in my Life). Written by: Henry Miller. Published in 2011.
- (The Body Artist). Written by: Don Delillo. Published in 2011.
- (A Woman on the Other Shore) Novel. Written by: Mitsuyo Kakuta. Published in 2012.
- (Camelia, save yourself by telling the truth) A Memoir of Iran. Written by: Camelia Eutekhabifard. Published in 2012.
- (Air-Conditioned Nightmare) Novel. Written by: Henry Miller. Published in 2012.
- (The Brooklyn Follies) Novel. Written by: Paul Auster. Published in 2012.
- (The World of Lawrence: A Passionate Appreciation). Written by: Henry Miller. Published in 2012.
- (The Great Gatsby). Written by: F. Scott Fitzgerald. Published in 2013.
- (The Gatekeeper) Memoir. Written by: Terry Eagleton. Published in 2014.
- (If the War Goes on: Reflections on War and Politics). Written by: Hermann Hesse. Published in 2014.
- (The Lost Girl) Novel. Written by: D. H. Lawrance. Published in 2015.
- (The White Peacock) Novel. Written by: D. H. Lawrance. Published in 2015.
- (There but for the) Novel. Written by: Ali Smith. Published in 2015.
- (Intruder in the Dust) Novel. Written by: William Faulkner. Published in 2015.
- (Steppenworlf) Novel. Written by: Hermann Hesse. Published by: Masciliana Editions. Published in 2015.
- (Reason, Faith, and Revolution: Reflections on the God Debate). Written by: Terry Eagleton. Published in 2016.
- (The Accidental) Novel. Written by: Ali Smith. Published in 2016.
- (How to be Both) Novel. Written by: Ali Smith. Published in 2017.
- (Fear of Flying) Novel. Written by the American Author: Erica Jong. Published in 2017.
- (The Book of Illusions) Novel. Written by: Paul Auster. Published in 2017.
- (Fear of Fifty: A Midlife Memoir). Written by: Erica Jong. Published by: 2018.
- (). Written by: Written by: Phillip Roth. Published in 2018.
- (Roderick Hudson). Written by: Henry James. Published in 2018.
- (Culture and the Death of God). Written by: Terry Eagolton. Published in 2018.
- (Radical Sacrific). Written by: Terry Eagleton. Published in 2019.
- (I Married a Communist). Written by: Philip Roth. Published in 2019.
- (Tender is the Night) Novel. Written by: F. Scott Fitzgerald. Published in 2019.
- (Cosmopolis) Novel. Written by: Don DeLillo. Published in 2019.
- (Lights Out in Wonderland) Novel. Written by: DBC Pierre. Published in 2019.
- (A Literate Passion: Letters of Anais Nin & Henry Miller, 1932 – 1953). Published in 2020.
