= Why Marx Was Right =

2011 non-fiction book by Terry Eagleton

- First edition cover
- Author: Terry Eagleton
- Subject: Marxism and Karl Marx
- Publisher: Yale University Press
- Publication date: 17 June 2011
- Pages: 272
- ISBN: 978-0-300-16943-0

Why Marx Was Right is a 2011 non-fiction book by the British academic Terry Eagleton about the 19th-century philosopher Karl Marx and the schools of thought, collectively known as Marxism, that arose from his work. Written for laypeople, Why Marx Was Right outlines ten objections to Marxism that they may hold and aims to refute each one in turn. These include arguments that Marxism is irrelevant owing to changing social classes in the modern world, that it is deterministic and utopian, and that Marxists oppose all reforms and believe in an authoritarian state.

In his counterarguments, Eagleton explains how class struggle is central to Marxism, and that history is seen as a progression of modes of production, like feudalism and capitalism, involving the materials, technology and social relations required to produce goods and services within the society. Under a capitalist economy, the working class, known as the proletariat, are those lacking significant autonomy over their labour conditions, and have no control over the means of production. Eagleton describes how revolutions could lead to a new mode of production—socialism—in which the working class have control, and an eventual communist society could make the state obsolete. He explores the failures of the Soviet Union and other Marxist–Leninist countries.

As an author of both specialist and general books in the areas of literary theory, Marxism and Catholicism, Eagleton saw the historical moment as appropriate for Why Marx Was Right; critics said that the book was part of a resurgence in Marxist thought after the 2008 financial crisis. It was first published in 2011 and reprinted in 2018 to mark 200 years since Marx's birth. In Canada, it entered Maclean's bestseller list for two weeks in 2011.

Critics disagreed on whether the book succeeds in showing the relevance of Marxism. Its prose style garnered praise as witty and accessible from some reviewers, as well as criticism by others as lacking humour and using assertions rather than arguments. Experts, disagreeing about whether Eagleton's chosen objections were straw-men, suggested that the book would have benefited from coverage of the labour theory of value, the 2008 financial crisis, and modern Marxist thought. However, Eagleton's commentary on historical materialism was praised. Why Marx Was Right was criticised by some reviewers for its defence of the pre-Stalinist Soviet Union and other Marxist states. Some also argued that it contains economic mistakes and misrepresents Marx's views on human nature, reform and other subjects.

== Background ==
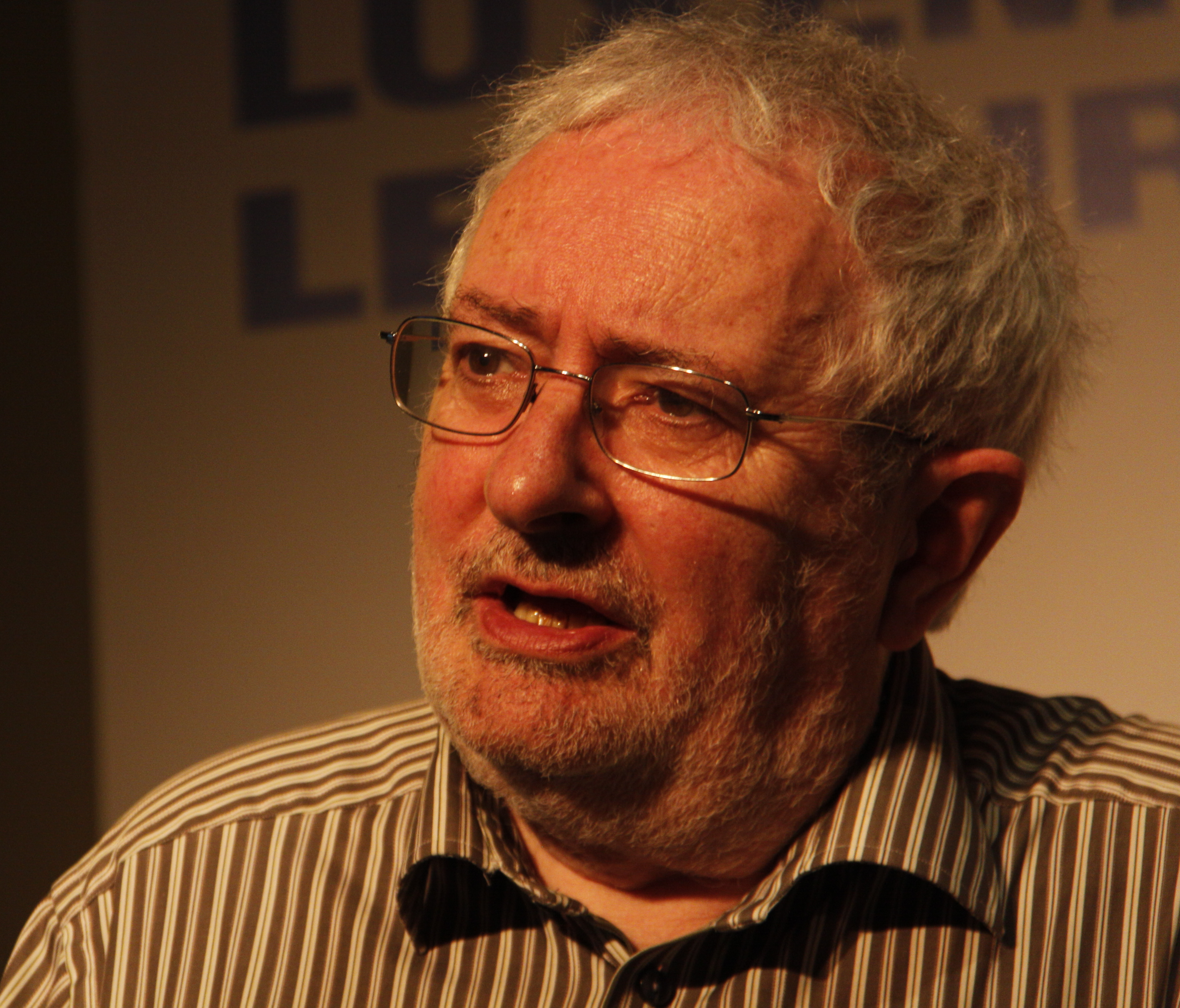
Author Terry Eagleton in 2013

Terry Eagleton is an academic in the fields of literary theory, Marxism and Catholicism. He turned to leftism while an undergraduate at the University of Cambridge in the 1960s, finding himself at the intersection of the New Left and Catholic progressivism in the Second Vatican Council reforms. Eagleton joined the UK branch of the International Socialists and then the Workers' Socialist League. His book Criticism and Ideology (1976) showcased a Marxist approach to literary theory. He rose to prominence with the text Literary Theory: An Introduction (1983), his best-known work. Alan Jacobs of First Things said that his style of writing "wittily and even elegantly" was unusual in literary theory at the time. After professorships in English literature at the University of Oxford (1992–2001) and cultural theory at the University of Manchester (2001–2008), Eagleton took visiting appointments at universities worldwide.

In the book, Eagleton uses a number of terms from Marxist philosophy, which arose from the ideas of the 19th-century German philosopher Karl Marx. In describing a society's use of labour, he employs the phrase means of production to describe the raw materials and tools needed to produce goods and services; the productive forces refer collectively to the means of production, human knowledge, and division of labour within the society. A society also has relations of production: roles like wage labour, where a person sells their labour to a boss in exchange for money. The productive forces and relations of production—together called the mode of production—are seen by Marx as describing the fundamental structure of a society; example modes of production include capitalism and feudalism.

In Marxian class theory, a person belongs to a specific social class (e.g. working class) based on the role they play in the mode of production. In capitalism, for example, the bourgeoisie are a class of property owners who control the means of production. Marx identified a pattern of one social class developing the productive forces until the relations of production are a barrier to further advancement. Class struggle—a proposed fundamental tension between different classes—is central to Marxists's understanding of how a new mode of production is established. Because he viewed societal development as rooted in physical conditions rather than abstract ideas, Marx was a historical materialist, rather than an idealist. Base and superstructure is a materialist model for describing society, wherein the mode of production ("base") is seen to shape the other aspects of the community: art, culture, science, etc. ("superstructure").

== Synopsis ==
Eagleton's chapters outline ten theoretical objections to Marxism, each followed by his counterargument. He begins with the objection that social class plays a lesser role in post-industrial societies, making Marxian class theory inapplicable. Eagleton's counterargument is that Marx anticipated phenomena such as globalisation and societal changes since Marx's era have not fundamentally changed the nature of capitalism. Eagleton finds that suppression of the labour movement was the predominant cause of declining popular support for Marxism from the mid-1970s onwards.

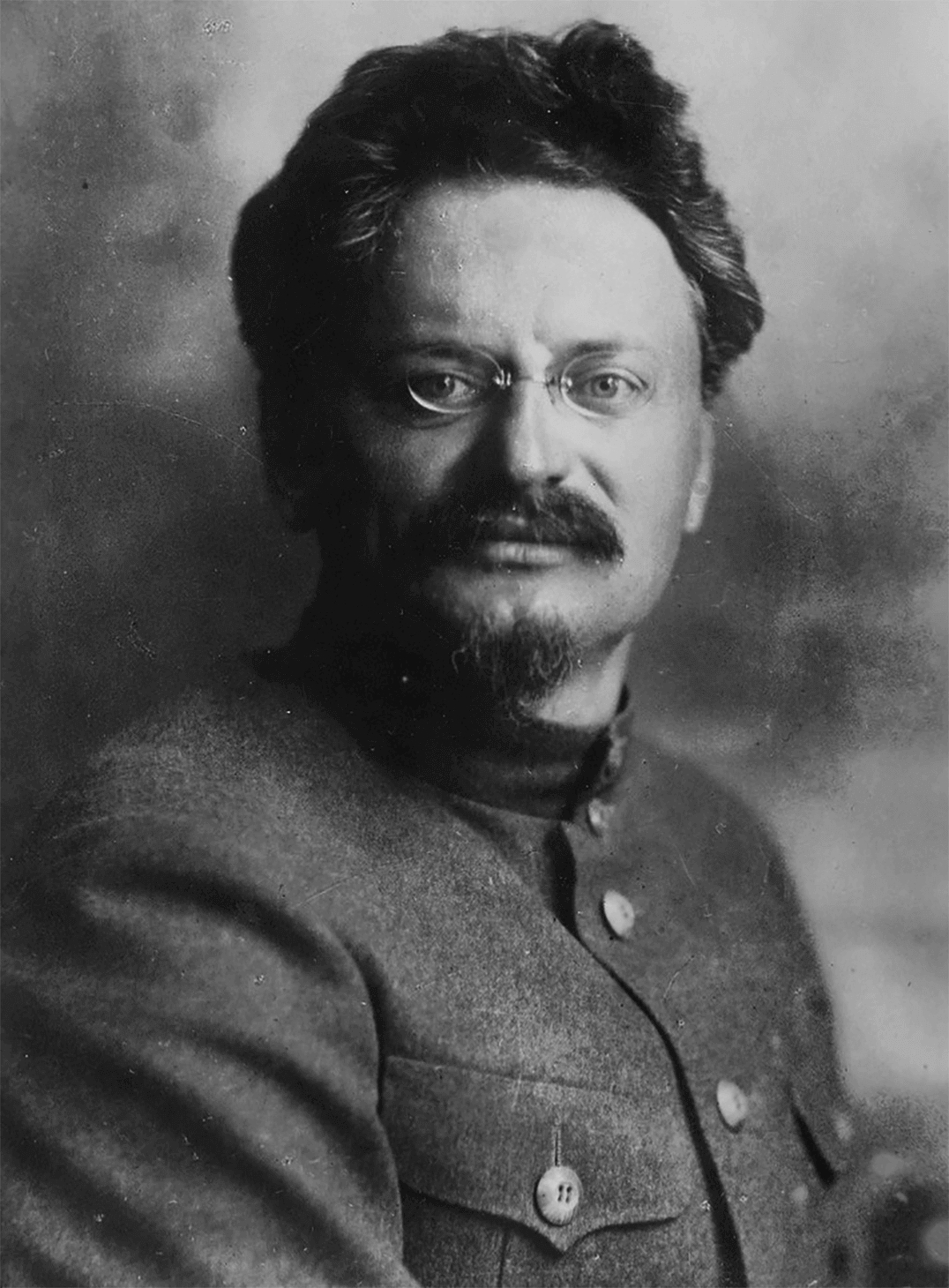
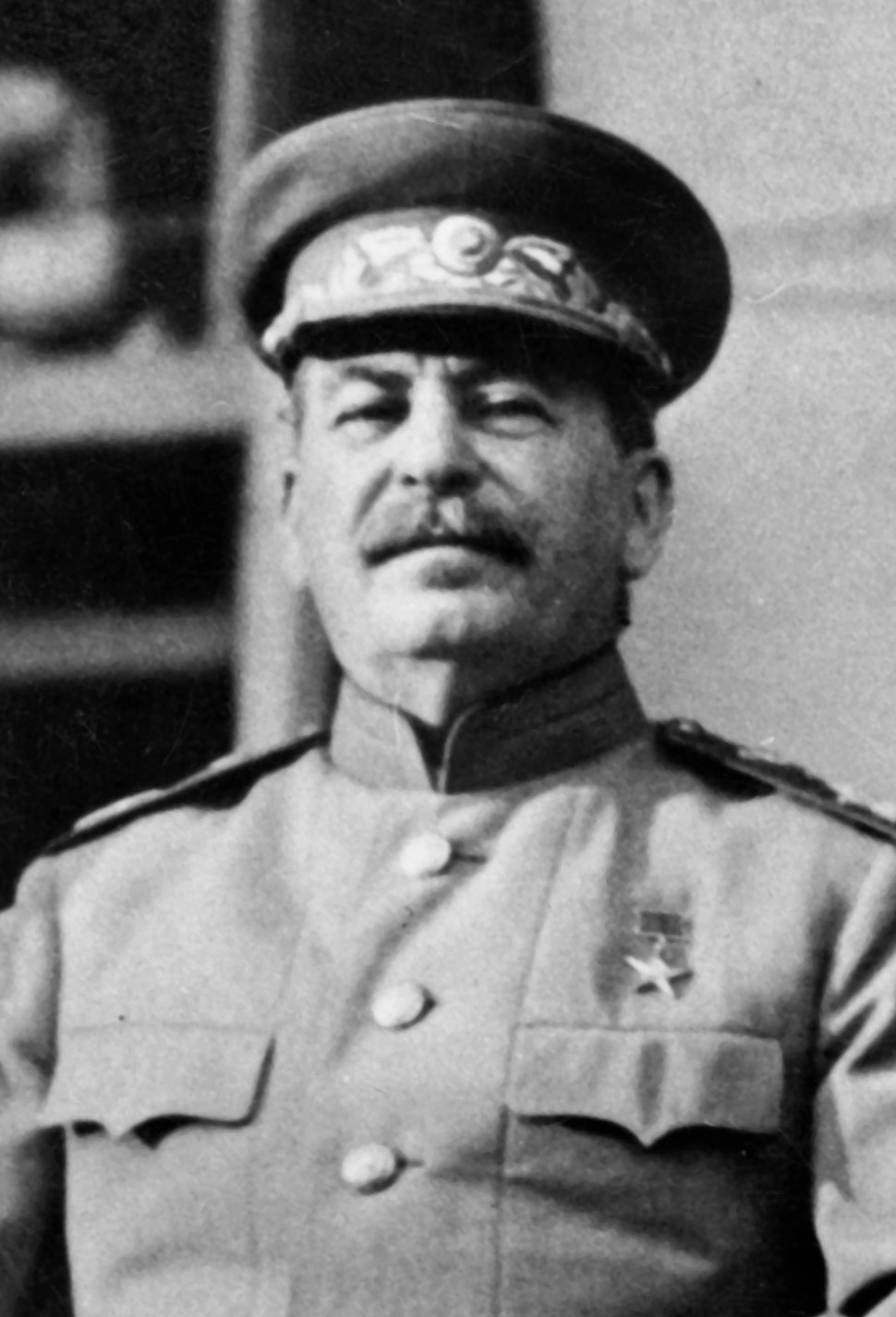
Eagleton contrasts the different currents of Marxism represented by Leon Trotsky (left) and Joseph Stalin (right).

The second objection is that Marxist governance results in mass murder, infringements on freedom, and other hardships. In the chapter, Eagleton describes approaches to socialism that differ from those of failed communist states and compares communist failures to capitalist ones. Regarding Marx, Vladimir Lenin and Leon Trotsky, Eagleton outlines conditions he believes are required for successful socialism: an educated population, existing prosperity, and international support after an initial revolution. He says that socialism with inadequate material resources results in regimes like Stalinist Russia, which was criticised by Trotskyist Marxists and libertarian socialists. An alternative mode of production is market socialism, in which the means of production would be collectively owned, but democratic worker cooperatives would compete in marketplace conditions.

Third, Eagleton argues against the position that Marxism requires belief that societal change is predetermined. Marx's view was that societies can develop in different directions—for instance, capitalism could stagnate, or lead to socialism or fascism. Thus it is not deterministic.

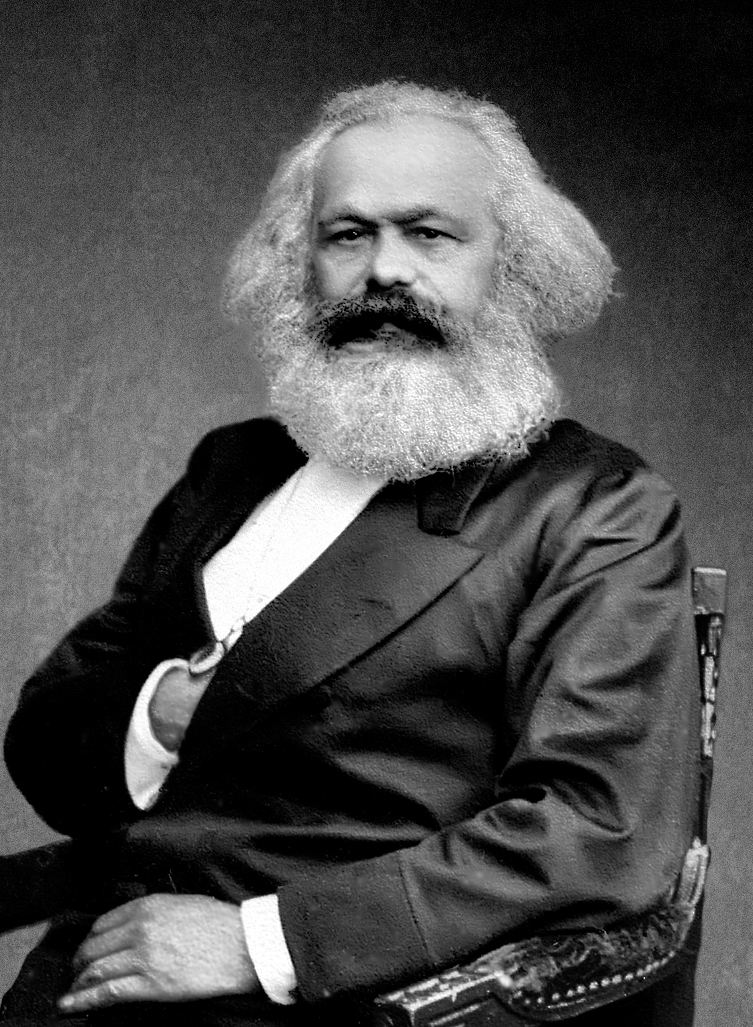
Karl Marx (1818–1883)

Fourth is the claim that Marxism is utopian, erasing human nature to depict a perfect world. Marx, however, was sceptical of utopian socialists and did not aim to describe an ideal future. He was a materialist who eschewed idealism, in opposition to liberal, Enlightenment thought. Marx likely thought that human nature exists, according to Eagleton, who writes that socialism would not require altruism from each citizen, only a structural change to social institutions. Marx, an individualist, viewed uniformity as a feature of capitalism, and communism as a realisation of individual freedom. He rejected a bourgeois view of equality as too abstract and obscuring capitalism's inherent inequalities.

The fifth chapter analyses whether Marxism is a form of economic determinism, presenting all of life through a narrow framework of economics. Though Marxists view history as the study of progressing modes of production, so did Enlightenment thinkers such as Adam Smith. Marx's base and superstructure model is not deterministic, according to Eagleton, as the superstructure is not fully determined by the base, and can also cause the base to change. In Marxism, the class struggle may determine the progression of society, but a class is not just an economic status: it is associated with traditions, values and culture.

Sixth is the assertion that Marxist materialism rejects spirituality and sees consciousness as merely a physical phenomenon. Though past materialists saw humans as just matter, Marx's form of materialism started with the fundamental concept that people are active beings with agency. In Eagleton's reading of Marx, the human mind is not something different from the human body, and spirituality and consciousness are matters of bodily experiences. Eagleton lists structures, like American born again churches, that can be part of both base and superstructure, and facets of life, like love, that cannot be categorised as either.

The seventh chapter is framed by an anti-Marxist argument that social mobility is increasing and social classes have changed since Marx's day, rendering the ideology outdated; however, Eagleton sees modern capitalism as disguising class inequalities that still exist. In Marxism, class is about a person's role in production rather than their outlook. The proletariat (working class) includes everybody who has little control over their labour, which they are compelled to sell to advance a boss's capital. Eagleton argues that Marx's ideas are resilient to changes since his lifetime. In Marx's era, female domestic servants were the largest group of proletarians, but Marx identified a growing middle class of administrators and managers. White-collar workers can be working class, and culture, ethnicity, identity and sexuality are linked to social class.

The eighth objection is that Marxists advocate a violent revolution by a minority of people who will instate a new society, making them anti-democracy and anti-reform. Eagleton says that some revolutions such as the October Revolution were less violent than, for instance, the American civil rights movement reforms; he sees revolution as a lengthy process with long-term causes. Though conceding that Marxism has led to much bloodshed, Eagleton argues that capitalism has too, and few modern Marxists defend Joseph Stalin or Mao Zedong. Socialist revolution would require the working class to overthrow the bourgeoisie—a democratic action, as most people are working class. Though some communists, deemed "ultra-leftists", reject all parliamentary democracy and reform attempts, others use these to work towards revolution. Marx participated in reformist groups like trade unions and may have believed that socialism could be achieved peacefully in some countries.

Ninth is the argument that Marxism will install an authoritarian state led by a dictator. Though Marx spoke of a "dictatorship of the proletariat", in his era dictatorship meant "rule by the majority". Rather than authoritarianism, he wanted a withering away of the state—a communist society would have no violent state to defend the status quo, though central administrative bodies would remain. Contemporary Marxists do not wish to lead an authoritarian state as they believe that power held by private financial institutions would make socialism via state control impossible.

The last idea is that recent radical movements—including environmentalism, feminism and gay liberation—are independent of Marxism and make it defunct. Eagleton aims to show that Marxism had a role in each of these movements. He writes that some Marxist culture is patriarchal (i.e. power is held by men), but Marxism and feminism have cross-pollinated as Marxist feminism. African nationalism incorporated Marxist ideas and Bolsheviks supported self-determination, despite Marx speaking in favour of imperialism in some cases. On the topic of naturalism, Eagleton describes Marx's views on the interplay between humans and nature: human history is part of natural history, but under capitalism, nature is seen only as a resource.

== Publication history ==
The book was published in hardback on 17 June 2011 (ISBN 9780300181531) and in paperback in 2012. A second edition with a new preface (ISBN 9780300231069) marked Marx's bicentenary in 2018, accompanied by an audiobook read by Roger Clark. Commonweal published an extract from the original book.

Throughout his career, Eagleton has aimed to alternate between specialist books and books for the general reader; Why Marx Was Right is in the latter category. He said that the historical moment was right for the book. Eagleton saw the September 11 attacks and the 2008 financial crisis as crises that made capitalism more readily noticeable in daily life. While Marxism had been unfashionable due to the failures of the Soviet Union and modern China, these crises caused a resurgence in Marxist thought, leading to books like G. A. Cohen's Why Not Socialism? (2009) and Alain Badiou's The Communist Hypothesis (2010).

Eagleton was motivated by "a feeling of the continued relevance of Marx in a world in which he seems to be so obsolete". (Note: Quoted in Spanish: "la sensación de continua relevancia de Marx en un Mundo en el que parece estar tan obsoleto".) Eagleton was interested in the rhetorical conceit of defending Marxism against individual points of layperson criticism, that Marxism is "irrelevant or offensive or authoritarian or backwards-looking", and believed Marx's views had been "extraordinarily caricatured". In a talk, Eagleton recounted that a reader sent a letter asking why the book was not called Why Marx Is Right in present tense and replied "he's dead, actually".

Eagleton, who is from an Irish Catholic family, saw the book's sixth chapter to be among its most important. In arguing that spirituality is connected to the material world as a way to discuss "human relationships, historical realities, justice" and other topics, (Note: Quoted in Spanish: "espiritualidad simplemente es otra manera de hablar de las Relaciones humanas, de las realidades históricas, de Justicia, etc.") he drew connections between Catholic theology and Marx's base and superstructure construct.

== Reception ==
The book spent two weeks on the Canadian Maclean's top-ten non-fiction bestseller list in June 2011. In 2016, the book was a non-fiction bestseller in Calgary.

=== Critical reception ===
Social Alternative, Publishers Weekly, Science & Society and Weekend Australian each affirmed that the book proved Marxism's contemporary value. Kavish Chetty (writing in both Cape Argus and Daily News) saw it as "still a necessary volume in the reinvigorated quest to rescue Marx", though he also had criticisms of the book. Economic and Political Weekly believed that Eagleton had succeeded in correcting "vulgar misconceptions", as did Social Scientist. Dissenting critics included Actualidad Económica, The Guardian's Tristram Hunt and The American Conservative, the last of which saw the book as failing to clearly explain Marx's beliefs or why they were compelling. Choice Reviews recommended the book as an introductory text and Estudios de Asia y Africa pointed to the book as providing a useful framework for considering the future of the 2011 Egyptian revolution.

==== Writing style ====
Science & Society, Publishers Weekly and The Irish Times all praised the book for its wit. Times Higher Education enjoyed Eagleton's "infallible dash, ... unnerving hyperbole and explosive jokes", while The Age likened Eagleton's "verbal exuberance" to that of George Bernard Shaw. Economic and Political Weekly reviewed the writing as both "great fun", but potentially confusing for those unfamiliar with the author. In contrast, critics including The Australian, Libertarian Papers and Chetty criticised Eagleton's humour as lacking; Hunt felt that the creativity and bravado of the Marxist tradition was absent.

Social Scientist and The Irish Times considered its prose accessible, brimming with what Sunday Herald called Eagleton's "characteristic brio", making it as "readable and provocative" as his other works. However, The Christian Century found Eagleton's flourishes to sometimes distract from his core argument. Financial Times similarly judged Eagleton's cultural allusions to be "trying too hard to reach the general reader". Actualidad Económica said the book's prose was inferior to that of Marx himself.

Commentary, First Things and Times Higher Education criticised what they considered weak argumentation throughout the book. The latter described Eagleton as using "more assertion than argument". The book is an apologia of Marx, according to The New Republic, despite Eagleton's protestations to the contrary. Slightly more positively, Financial Times identified "delicious imaginative insights" among "baffling" analogies. The American Conservative found Eagleton's theoretical analysis better than his historical analysis, but criticised his "arguments [as] often elementary and sometimes glib", a finding shared by Symploke, who saw Eagleton's "forceful" positions to be unoriginal. A review in The Christian Century concluded that Eagleton's arguments were convincing.

==== Subject matter ====
Critics highlighted topics omitted or insufficiently covered, such as Marxist economics (e.g. the labour theory of value), the 2008 financial crisis, and post-Marxism. Two critics viewed Eagleton's definitions of terminology and supporting statistics as insufficient. Marx's theory of surplus-value, which Eagleton presents in the book, was seen as discredited by Libertarian Papers and Actualidad Económica. The Times Literary Supplement questioned why Eagleton's philosophical anthropology drew from early Marx. The American Conservative and The Guardian writer Owen Hatherley believed that the ten objections were not straw men, while Libertarian Papers and Financial Times felt they were arbitrarily chosen. The Australian suggested that Eagleton should have engaged directly with a "combative opponent".

Reviewers criticised Eagleton's defence of the pre-Stalinist Soviet Union and other communist countries. The Irish Times and Weekend Australian found this to be the book's weakest part, believing that the states should not be praised. Science & Society found his brief mentions of China to be "woefully inadequate", thinking that a stronger defence could be made, and Commentary highlighted Eagleton's praise for childcare in East Germany as one of several "bizarre exculpations" of Marxist states. In rebuttal to Eagleton, who said that Eastern Europe and Maoist China transitioned away from feudalism with communism, The Irish Times commented that U.S. administrations of East Asia accomplished the same "at far less cost", as did the U.K. with Land Acts in Ireland. Hatherley was a dissenting critic, finding Eagleton "convincing" on the topic of the Soviet Union, while Rethinking Marxism criticised Eagleton from the left as "trapped within the confines of the market" for presenting market socialism as the alternative to Stalinism.

Several reviews took issue with Eagleton's economic claims and interpretations of Marx's views. Both Hunt and Actualidad Económica criticised Eagleton's assertion that a third of British children live in poverty. Libertarian Papers critiqued that Eagleton conflated state interventionism with laissez-faire economics and The Irish Times said that he violated a basic rule of economics by suggesting that both price and quantity of goods can be fixed. Reviewers argued that Marx and Engels, in contrast with Eagleton's portrayal, saw communism as entailing a change in human nature. Other reviewers thought Eagleton exaggerated Marx's limited support or tolerance for reform, environmentalism and religion.

Reviewers highlighted Eagleton's sections on materialism as particularly strong. Social Scientist enjoyed this content, while Hunt praised the book's coverage of democracy, free will and modernity. The Times Literary Supplement wrote that chapters three to six had a potential utility to historians, simple language and a vision of Marxism that matched Eagleton's other writings, which somewhat redeemed the rest of the book. The Irish Times described the sixth chapter, on materialism, as the book's "most enlightening". Dissenting, Times Higher Education thought that Eagleton gives too much weight to materialism, a topic that remains interesting only to "theological Marxists" since the writings of Ludwig Wittgenstein.

== See also ==
- What Marx Really Meant, a 1934 book that similarly modernized Marxism for its own era
- History and Class Consciousness, a 1923 book on Marx, Hegel and Bolshevism
- Marx's critique of political economy, the basis of Marx's economic thought
