= Oxford English Limited =

Socialist feminist organisation

Oxford English Limited (OEL) was a socialist-feminist group of undergraduate and postgraduate students campaigning for progressive reforms in the Oxford University English Faculty between 1982 and 1992. OEL's demands included the abolition of compulsory Anglo-Saxon and new optional papers in women’s writing and in literary theory.

Oxford English Limited was created by Daniel Baron-Cohen, Ken Hirschkop and Robin Gable, with support from Terry Eagleton at Wadham College. It organised a programme of seminars, visiting speakers, conferences, debates, student questionnaires and campaigns in pursuit of its aims. A typical highlight was the ‘State of Criticism’ conference on 8 March 1986 (masterminded by President of OEL, Peter Higginson), at which more than 400 people assembled in the English Faculty building in St Cross to hear Raymond Williams, Terry Eagleton, Francis Mulhern and others discuss the future of literary studies.

OEL activists in later years included Ros Ballaster, David Hawkes, Tony Pinkney, Carol Watts, Stephanie Flood, Forbes Morlock, Sally Ledger, Alastair Williams, Ben Morgan, Terry Murphy and Giles Goodland. Tetsuo Maruko and Craig Dowler played supporting roles from the sidelines. There was some limited support from within the Faculty from David Norbrook and Paul Hamilton and Stephen Regan at Ruskin College.

In April 1986 OEL created a journal, News from Nowhere: Journal of the Oxford English Faculty Opposition (ISSN 0957-1868) to further its local polemic aims and to advance work in left-wing and feminist literary theory and cultural studies more generally. Nine issues were published between 1986 and 1991. The editor Tony Pinkney’s contributions across these issues offer a sustained and theorised history (and counter-history) of Oxford English Studies from Matthew Arnold to the 1980s. A one-volume selection from News from Nowhere will be published by Kelmsgarth Press in 2015.

The OEL project at Oxford has been recognised in later histories of the rise of literary theory in the UK. For example, Josephine M. Guy and Ian Small note in their Politics and Value in English Studies that ‘there has been a long-standing debate in the Oxford periodical News from Nowhere about the future of English studies in that university’; and Andrew Milner, in his important book Re-Imagining Cultural Studies: The Promise of Cultural Materialism, remarks that ‘a self-proclaimed “third generation” of radical literary theorists would coalesce around Oxford English Limited and the journal, News from Nowhere’.

The Oxford English Faculty of the late 1970s, had not proved able to open itself to the waves of Continental theory which were then remaking the very field of literary studies, though work was being done by figures like Anne Jefferson and David Robey in Oxford European language studies. Oxford English Limited, despite its exiguous resources as it battled an entrenched and powerful Faculty, thus represented the new energies of the subject, and it and its William Morris-inspired journal remain a small but colourful chapter in the wider literary theory ‘revolution’ of the 1980s and 1990s.
