= Ruth Turner (political advisor) =

British political advisor (born 1970)

Ruth Turner (born 1970 in Dublin, Ireland as Caitriona Ruth Turner) was formerly Director of Government Relations within Tony Blair's Downing Street office.

== Biography ==
As daughter of leading Catholic writer and academic Denys Turner, Turner spent her childhood moving between university towns as her father's career gathered pace. Turner left home in the late 1980s to study at the University of Salford, graduating with a BA in English & History in 1991 and followed by a sabbatical year as the Students Union's Deputy President for Communications, elected as the Labour Students candidate.

=== Big Issue in the North ===
Turner came to prominence as co-founder and former chairperson of the Big Issue in the North, which she started in 1992, before leaving in 2000. Turner subsequently co-founded with Simon Danczuk Urban Visions Limited, trading as Vision Twentyone, a research, public affairs and communications consultancy.

=== Labour Party ===
Rising through the Labour Party's ranks, she stood as a Labour candidate for the European Parliament elections in North-West England constituency in 1999, before becoming a member of its National Executive Committee in 2000. In 2005 she was placed in the key post of Head of Government Relations by Tony Blair, replacing Lady Morgan of Huyton, the Prime Minister's long-time adviser, who first recommended her. She worked directly for Tony Blair's chief of staff Jonathan Powell.

=== Tony Blair Faith Foundation ===
She followed Tony Blair on his exit from Downing Street, and was employed by the Tony Blair Faith Foundation. She served as the Foundation's Chief Executive from 2007 until April 2013 when she became its Director of Policy working part-time after maternity leave.

=== Controversy ===
In September 2006, it was reported that Turner had been interviewed under police caution under Scotland Yard's ongoing cash for peerages inquiry, but was found innocent of alleged charges after being questioned four times by police.
