= Herbert McCabe =

Irish Dominican priest and philosopher (1926–2001)

The Reverend Herbert McCabe OP
- Born: 2 August 1926
- Died: 28 June 2001 (aged 74)
- Relatives: Bernard McCabe (brother)

Education
- Education: Manchester University

Philosophical work
- Era: 20th-century philosophy
- Region: Western Philosophy
- School: Analytic philosophy Thomism
- Main interests: Philosophy of Religion; Ethics; Theology

Herbert John Ignatius McCabe OP (2 August 1926 – 28 June 2001) was an Irish Dominican priest, Catholic theologian and philosopher.

== Biography ==
Herbert McCabe was born in Middlesbrough in the North Riding of Yorkshire. He studied chemistry at Manchester University, but influenced by Dorothy Emmet switched to philosophy. He contributed a number of pieces to Humanitas, and became friends with Eric John among others.

McCabe joined the Dominicans in 1949, where under Victor White he began his lifelong study of the works of Thomas Aquinas. Born John Ignatius McCabe, he had as his novice master, Columba Ryan, who gave McCabe the religious name Herbert, in honour of Herbert of Derwentwater, a seventh-century Lakeland hermit. Ordained in 1955, he was a pastor in Newcastle for three years before being assigned as chaplain to De La Salle College, where one of his pupils was Terry Eagleton.

In 1965, he was sent to Cambridge as editor of the journal New Blackfriars but was removed in 1967 following a now-famous editorial in that journal in which he criticised the theologian Charles Davis for having left the Catholic Church. Davis left publicly, denouncing the Church as corrupt. McCabe countered that of course the Church was corrupt but that this was no reason to leave it. McCabe moved to Dublin, Ireland, during the controversy. He was reinstated three years later, and began his editorial that month in characteristically combative style: "As I was saying, before I was so oddly interrupted..." He spent many years teaching at Blackfriars, Oxford University, writing four books, The New Creation, a study of the Sacraments, in 1964; Law, Love and Language, on the centrality of language in ethics, in 1968; The Teaching of the Catholic Church, a short catechism, in 1986; God Matters in 1987; and God Still Matters, a collection of his articles, in 2002. He was a member of the Slant group, and combined a commitment to the thought of Thomas Aquinas and Wittgenstein with a socialist political stance.

In 1989 he was awarded the STM degree, the highest Dominican academic degree.

McCabe's sermons were carefully prepared and delivered with great intelligence and wit. A major theme was a caution against making God a god, of reducing the Creator to an object within this world, and thus committing idolatry. In 1974 McCabe became an Irish citizen.

Terry Eagleton attributed to his friend McCabe the view that 'If you don't love, you're dead, and if you do, they'll kill you.'

McCabe died at Oxford on 28 June 2001, and was buried at Wolvercote Cemetery on 5 July. His memorial service included a Spanish revolutionary song sung by his 80-year-old brother Bernard, a Joyce expert.

== Bibliography ==
- McCabe, Herbert, Law, Love and language (1968), London: Continuum, 2004.
- McCabe, Herbert, God Matters, (1987), London: Continuum, 2005.
- McCabe, Herbert, God Still Matters, London, New York: Continuum Books, 2002. ISBN 0-8264-6191-3.
- McCabe, Herbert, Faith Within Reason, London, New York: Continuum Books, 2007. ISBN 9780826495471.
- McCabe, Herbert, The Good Life: Ethics and the Pursuit of Happiness, London, New York: Bloomsbury Books, 2012. ISBN 9780826476470.
- Manni, Franco, Herbert McCabe. Recollecting a Fragmented Legacy, Eugene (Oregon): Wipf & Stock, 2020. ISBN 1725253305.

== See also ==
- Father Brian Davies, OP, his literary executor
