= Slant (journal) =

British Catholic magazine (1964–1970)

- Frequency: Bimonthly (from 1966)
- Publisher: Sheed and Ward
- Final issue: 1970
- Country: United Kingdom
- Language: English

Slant was a Catholic magazine associated with the University of Cambridge and the Dominican Order during the 1960s. It sought to combine Catholic belief with left-wing politics.

== Description ==
The context of Slant has been explained by James Smith in his critical introduction to Terry Eagleton. Slant came into being in the mid-1960s in Cambridge, as a journal "devoted to a Catholic exploration of .. radical politics". The magazine was influenced by the thinking of Ludwig Wittgenstein and Karl Marx.

The first issue was published in spring 1964. This issue began with an introduction by Raymond Williams and for the first six issues Slant was published quarterly. From volume 2 (February/March 1966), it evolved to a bimonthly publication and was eventually published by Sheed and Ward, a Catholic publishing house.

The editorial board of Slant included a number of students or recent students at Cambridge, several of whom went on to academic careers: Adrian Cunningham (who went on to be a professor of religious studies at the University of Lancaster), Terry Eagleton, and Leo Pyle (later a professor of biotechnology at the University of Reading). Martin Shaw (later a professor of sociology and international relations at the Universities of Hull and Sussex) was its student organiser. Dominican priest and philosopher Herbert McCabe was also affiliated. Denys Turner is a significant theologian influenced by Slant.

Some Slant writings were compiled as a book, Slant Manifesto, published by Sheed and Ward in 1966. Slant ceased publication in 1970 after 30 issues.

== See also ==
- Christian socialism
