= What Marx Really Meant =

1934 book by G. D. H. Cole

- Title page for What Marx Really Meant (1934)
- Author: G. D. H. Cole
- Subject: Marxism
- Publisher: Knopf
- Publication date: 1934
- Pages: 309

What Marx Really Meant is a 1934 book by G. D. H. Cole that attempted to modernize Marxism for the era since Karl Marx's 1883 death.

== See also ==
- Why Marx Was Right, a 2011 book that similarly modernized Marxism for its own era

== Bibliography ==
- Brown, E. Francis (1934). "Marxism Made Easy". Current History. 40 (3): VII–XII. ISSN 2641-080X. JSTOR 45337370.
- Heath, John (1934). "Review of A History of Bolshevism; What Marx Really Meant; Untergang des Marxismus". International Affairs. 13 (4): 564–566. doi:10.2307/2603408. ISSN 1473-8104. JSTOR 2603408.
- Kayden, Eugene M. (1935). "Review of What Marx Really Meant". Social Science. 10 (2): 181–182. ISSN 0037-7848. JSTOR 41882760.
- L., A. C. (1935). "Review of 'What Marx Really Meant'". El Trimestre Económico (in Spanish). 2 (6): 231–235. ISSN 0041-3011. JSTOR 23393086.
- Neisser, Hans (1934). "Review of What Marx Really Meant". The Annals of the American Academy of Political and Social Science. 176: 223–224. doi:10.1177/000271623417600126. ISSN 0002-7162. JSTOR 1020140. S2CID 143992392.
- Shaplen, Joseph (June 3, 1934). "G.D.H. Cole's Exposition of Karl Marx's Ideas". The New York Times. ISSN 0362-4331.
- Tuckerman, Gustavus (1934). "Review of What Marx Really Meant". The American Economic Review. 24 (4): 772–773. ISSN 0002-8282. JSTOR 1808260.
