= Denys Turner =

British philosopher and theologian (born 1942)

- Born: Denys Alan Turner; 5 August 1942 (age 84)
- Spouses: Marie Lambe (m. 1969; div. 2015); Courtney Palmbush (m. 2015)
- Children: 3, including Ruth Turner

Academic background
- Education: University College Dublin; St Edmund Hall, Oxford
- Thesis: The Ascription of Moral Weakness (1975)

Academic work
- Discipline: Philosophy; theology
- School or tradition: Marxism; Roman Catholicism
- Institutions: University of Bristol; University of Birmingham; Peterhouse, Cambridge; Yale University

Denys Alan Turner (born 5 August 1942) is a British philosopher and theologian.

== Career ==
Turner is the Horace Tracy Pitkin Professor of Historical Theology emeritus at Yale University, having been appointed in 2005. He was previously the Norris–Hulse Professor of Divinity at the University of Cambridge. He earned his Doctor of Philosophy degree in philosophy from the University of Oxford. He has written widely on political theory and social theory in relation to Christian theology, as well as on medieval thought, in particular, mystical theology and Christian mysticism.

Prior to his position at Cambridge, he was Professor of Theology and Head of Department at the University of Birmingham and has also held Head of Department at the University of Bristol. Turner also worked at University College Dublin and Manhattanville College, New York. He is currently a visiting professor at Princeton University. Turner is notable for his articles and books delving into the interplay between theology, Marxism and social theory.

== Personal life ==
Turner is Catholic and has three children: Ruth, John, and Brendan.

== Bibliography ==
=== Books ===
- On the Philosophy of Karl Marx, Dublin: Sceptre (1968), pp. 93.
- Marxism and Christianity, Oxford: Blackwell (1983), pp. 256. Paperback edn. 1984.
- Eros and Allegory, Kalamazoo: Cistercian Publications (1995), pp. vi + 471.
- The Darkness of God: Negativity in Christian Mysticism, Cambridge: Cambridge University Press (1995), pp. xi + 278. Paperback edition published September, 1998. Fourth impression, November, 1999. Electronic edition, 2002.
- Faith Seeking, London: SCM (2002), pp.xiii + 146. ISBN 9780334028888
- Faith, Reason, and the Existence of God, Cambridge: Cambridge University Press (2004), pp. xix + 271. ISBN 9780521602563
- Julian of Norwich, Theologian, New Haven: Yale University Press (2011), pp. 304. ISBN 978-0-300-16391-9. ISBN 0-300-16391-6.
- Thomas Aquinas: A Portrait, New Haven: Yale University Press (2013) ISBN 9780300205947
- God, Mystery, and Mystification. University of Notre Dame Press. 2019.
- Dante the Theologian (Cambridge University Press, 2022) ISBN 9781009168700

=== Articles and book chapters ===
- "Can a Christian be a Marxist?" (June 1975). New Blackfriars.
- "Marxism, liberation theology and the way of negation" (1999). In Christopher Rowland (ed.), The Cambridge Companion to Liberation Theology, Cambridge: Cambridge University Press, pp. 199–217. ISBN 978-0-521-46707-0. ISBN 0521467071.

=== Critical studies and reviews of Turner's work ===
God, Mystery, and Mystification

- New Blackfriars, Volume 102, Issue 1097, January 2021, pp. 139 - 141

== See also ==
- Slant (journal)

Academic offices
Preceded by Nicholas Lash	Norris–Hulse Professor of Divinity; 1999–2005	Succeeded by Sarah Coakley
