= Terry Eagleton =

English author and academic (born 1943)

Terry Eagleton FBA
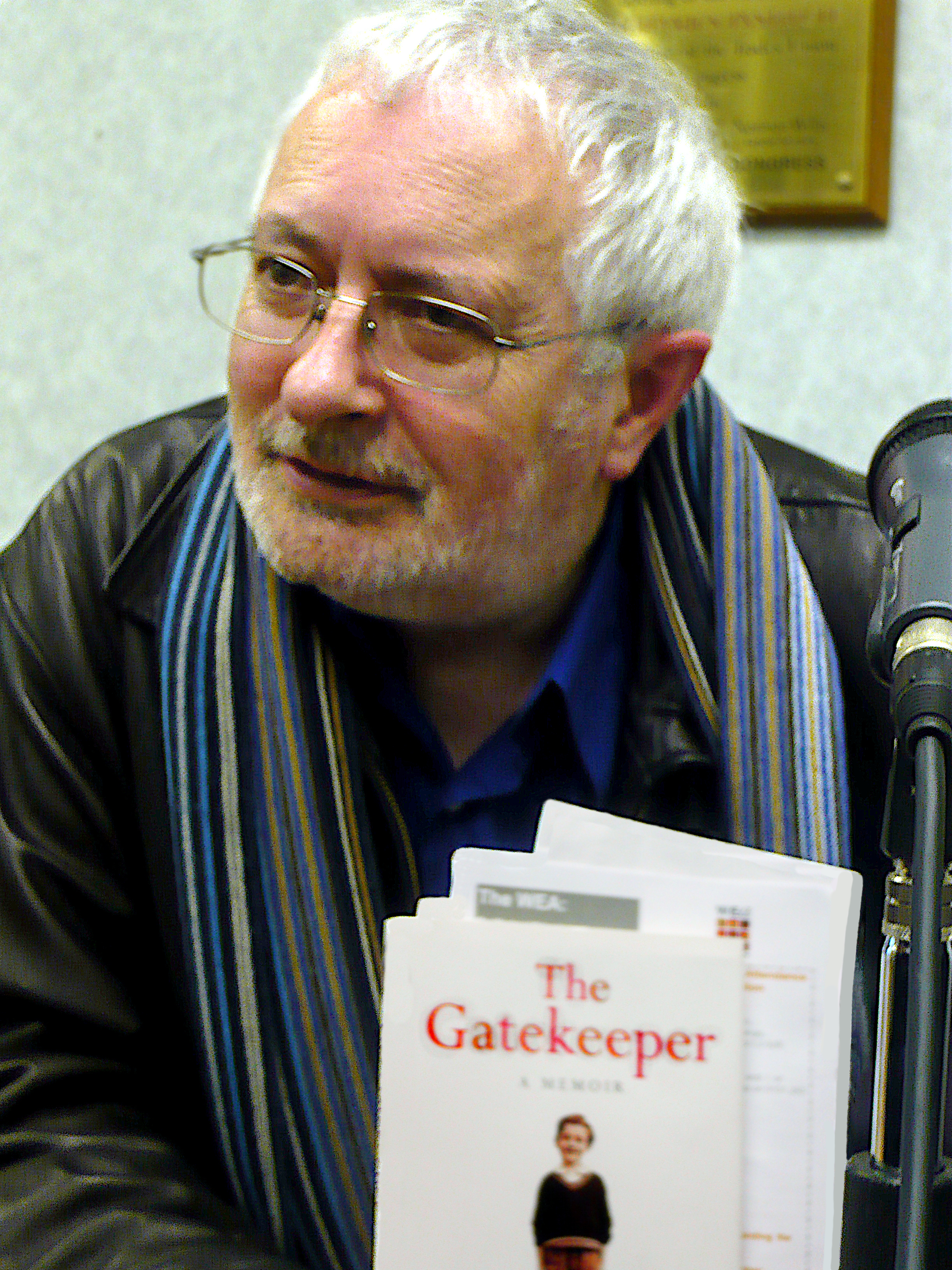
- Eagleton in 2008
- Born: Terence Francis Eagleton; 22 February 1943 (age 83); Salford, Lancashire, England
- Spouses: Rosemary Galpin (m. 1966; div. 1976); Willa Murphy (m. 1997)
- Children: 5

Academic background
- Education: Trinity College, Cambridge; Jesus College, Cambridge
- Academic advisor: Raymond Williams
- Influences: Karl Marx; F. R. Leavis; Raymond Williams; Louis Althusser; Herbert McCabe

Academic work
- Discipline: Literature; philosophy
- Sub-discipline: Literary theory
- School or tradition: Continental philosophy; Marxism
- Institutions: Wadham College, Oxford; Linacre College, Oxford; St Catherine's College, Oxford; University of Manchester; Lancaster University
- Doctoral students: Ken Hirschkop; Sally Ledger
- Notable students: Frank Albers
- Notable works: Literary Theory (1983); The Ideology of the Aesthetic (1990); The Illusions of Postmodernism (1996)
- Notable ideas: Distinction between good and bad utopianism

Terence Francis Eagleton (born 22 February 1943) is an English literary theorist, critic, and public intellectual. He is currently Distinguished Professor (Emeritus) of English Literature at Lancaster University.

Eagleton has published over forty books, but remains best known for Literary Theory: An Introduction (1983), which has sold over 750,000 copies. The work elucidated the emerging literary theory of the modern period, as well as arguing that all literary theory is necessarily political. He has also been a prominent critic of postmodernism, publishing works such as The Illusions of Postmodernism (1996) and After Theory (2003). He argues that, influenced by postmodernism, cultural theory has wrongly devalued objectivity and ethics. His thinking is influenced by Marxism and Christianity.

Formerly the Thomas Warton Professor of English Literature at the University of Oxford (1992–2001) and John Edward Taylor Professor of Cultural Theory at the University of Manchester (2001–2008), Eagleton has held visiting appointments at universities around the world including Cornell, Duke, Iowa, Melbourne, Trinity College Dublin, and Yale.

Eagleton delivered Yale University's 2008 Terry Lectures and the University of Edinburgh's 2010 Gifford Lecture entitled The God Debate. He gave the 2010 Richard Price Memorial Lecture at Newington Green Unitarian Church, speaking on "The New Atheism and the War on Terror". In 2009, he published a book which accompanied his lectures on religion, entitled Reason, Faith, and Revolution: Reflections on the God Debate.

In July 2024, Eagleton was awarded an honorary doctorate by Lancaster University.

== Early life ==
Eagleton was born in Salford, Lancashire, England, on 22 February 1943, to Francis Paul Eagleton and his wife, Rosaleen (née Riley) Eagleton. He grew up in a working-class Catholic family of Irish descent in Salford, with roots in County Galway. His mother's side of the family had strong Irish republican sympathies. He served as an altar boy at a local Carmelite convent where he was responsible for escorting novice nuns taking their vows, a role referred to in the title of his memoir The Gatekeeper (2002).

== Education and academia ==
Eagleton was educated at De La Salle College, a Roman Catholic grammar school in Pendleton, Salford. His experience at the College, particularly of the then Principal Brother Columba (who disapproved of him enough to belittle his award in front of the entire school and parents at the 1961 speech day in the Free Trade Hall, Manchester), is described in his book The Gatekeeper. In 1961, he went to read English at Trinity College, Cambridge, from which he graduated with first-class honours. He later described his undergraduate experience as a "waste of time". In 1964, he moved to Jesus College, Cambridge, where as a junior research fellow and doctoral student, he became the youngest fellow at the college since the 18th century. He was supervised by Raymond Williams. His thesis was on Edward Carpenter and was examined by E. P. Thompson. It was during this period that his socialist convictions began to take hold, and he edited a radical Catholic leftist periodical called Slant.

In 1969, he moved to the University of Oxford where he became a fellow and tutor of Wadham College (1969–1989), Linacre College (1989–1993) and St Catherine's College, becoming Thomas Warton Professor of English in 1992. At Wadham, Eagleton ran a seminar on Marxist literary theory which, in the 1980s, metamorphosed into the radical pressure group Oxford English Limited and its journal News from Nowhere: Journal of the Oxford English Faculty Opposition, to which he contributed several pieces. In 2001, Eagleton left Oxford to become the John Edward Taylor Professor of English at the University of Manchester.

== Career ==
Eagleton began his literary studies with the 19th and 20th centuries, then conformed to the stringent academic Marxism of the 1970s. He then published an attack on his mentor Williams's relation to the Marxist tradition in the pages of the New Left Review, in the mode of the French critic Louis Althusser. In the 1960s, he became involved with the left-wing Catholic group Slant, authoring a number of theological articles (including A Marxist Interpretation of Benediction), as well as a book Towards a New Left Theology. A major turning point was his Criticism & Ideology (1976) in which Eagleton discusses various theorists and critics from F. R. Leavis and (his tutor) Raymond Williams to Pierre Macherey. This earliest response to Theory is critical and substantive with Eagleton supplying a dense web of categories for "a materialist criticism" which situates the author as well as the text in the general mode of production, the literary mode of production and particular ideologies. In chapter 4 he gives a thorough overview of one theme in the English context – "organicist concepts of society" or "community" – as worked by petty-bourgeois Victorian writers, from George Eliot to D. H. Lawrence, and how this determines textual form in each instance.

=== Literary Theory and After Theory ===
In Literary Theory: An Introduction (1983, revised 1996), Eagleton surveys the history of theoretical approaches to literature, from its beginnings with Matthew Arnold, through formalism, psychoanalysis, and structuralism, to post-structuralism. In the process, he demonstrates what is the thesis of the book: that theory is necessarily political. Theory is always presented as if it is unstained by point of view and is neutral, but in fact it is impossible to avoid having a political perspective. Peter Barry has said of the book that it "greatly contributed to the 'consolidation' of literary theory and helped to establish it firmly on the undergraduate curriculum". Eagleton's approach to literary criticism is one firmly rooted in the Marxist tradition, though he has also incorporated techniques and ideas from more recent modes of thought as structuralism, Lacanian analysis and deconstruction. As his memoir The Gatekeeper recounts, Eagleton's Marxism has never been solely an academic pursuit. He was active in the International Socialists (along with Christopher Hitchens) and then the Workers' Socialist League whilst in Oxford. He has been a regular contributor to the London Review of Books.

After Theory (2003) was written two decades later, after the end of the great period of High Theory – the cultural theory of Foucault, the postmodernists, Derrida, et al. Looking back, Eagleton evaluates its achievements and failures, and proposes new directions needing to be pursued. He considers that among the great achievements of Theory were the expansion of objects of study (to include gender, sexuality, popular culture, post-colonialism, etc.), and the wide-ranging self-reflective criticism of traditional assumptions. But in Eagleton's estimation there were also many serious mistakes, for instance: the assault on the normative and the insistence on the relativity of truth leaves us powerless to criticize oppression; the rejection of objectivity and (excessively) of all forms of essentialism bespeak an unrecognized idealism, or at least a blindness to our human materiality, ultimately born of an unconscious fear of death; and cultural studies has wrongly avoided consideration of ethics, which for Eagleton is inextricably tied to a proper politics. It is virtue and politics and how they may be realized, among other things, that Eagleton offers as new avenues needing to be explored by cultural studies. After Theory fleshes out this political aspect, tied to ethics, growing out of the fact that humans exist in neediness and dependency on others, their freedom bounded by the common fact of death.

=== Dawkins, Hitchens and the New Atheism ===
Eagleton has become a vocal critic of what has been called the New Atheism. In October 2006, he published a review of Richard Dawkins's The God Delusion in the London Review of Books. Eagleton begins by questioning Dawkins's methodology and understanding: "Imagine someone holding forth on biology whose only knowledge of the subject is the Book of British Birds, and you have a rough idea of what it feels like to read Richard Dawkins on theology." Eagleton further writes, "Nor does [Dawkins] understand that because God is transcendent of us (which is another way of saying that he did not have to bring us about), he is free of any neurotic need for us and wants simply to be allowed to love us." He concludes by suggesting Dawkins has not been attacking organised faith so much as a sort of rhetorical straw man:

Apart from the occasional perfunctory gesture to 'sophisticated' religious believers, Dawkins tends to see religion and fundamentalist religion as one and the same. This is not only grotesquely false; it is also a device to outflank any more reflective kind of faith by implying that it belongs to the coterie and not to the mass. The huge numbers of believers who hold something like the theology I outlined above can thus be conveniently lumped with rednecks who murder abortionists and malign homosexuals.

==== Terry and Gifford Lectures ====
In April 2008 Eagleton delivered Yale University's Terry Lectures, with the title Faith and Fundamentalism: Is belief in Richard Dawkins necessary for salvation?, constituting a continuation of the critique he had begun in The London Review of Books. Introducing his first lecture with an admission of ignorance of both theology and science, Eagleton goes on to affirm: "All I can claim in this respect, alas, is that I think I may know just about enough theology to be able to spot when someone like Richard Dawkins or Christopher Hitchens – a couplet I shall henceforth reduce for convenience to the solitary signifier Ditchkins – is talking out of the back of his neck." An expanded version of these lectures was published in 2009 as Reason, Faith, and Revolution: Reflections on the God Debate.

=== Football ===
Eagleton sees football as a new opium of the people distracting ordinary people from more serious, important social concerns. Eagleton is pessimistic as to whether this distraction can be ended:

For the most part football these days is the opium of the people, not to speak of their crack cocaine. Its icon is the impeccably Tory, slavishly conformist Beckham. The Reds are no longer the Bolsheviks. Nobody serious about political change can shirk the fact that the game has to be abolished. And any political outfit that tried it on would have about as much chance of power as the chief executive of BP has in taking over from Oprah Winfrey.

== Politics ==
Eagleton joined the Stockport Young Socialists at 16, influenced by his schoolfriend Bernard Regan. As a student at Cambridge, he was involved with the left-wing Catholic group Slant. He read Marx and Lenin in this period. Eagleton was also involved in the Cambridge Left Forum, which aimed to bring socialists in the university and local trade unionists together. At the end of the 1960s, Eagleton left the Slant group and moved to the secular, revolutionary left by joining the International Socialists. In the late 1970s he re-joined the Labour Party in Oxford and become a member of the Labour Committee on Ireland. In the early 1980s, he was a member of the Workers' Socialist League, whose activities were centred on the car factory in Cowley.

== Criticism of Martin and Kingsley Amis ==
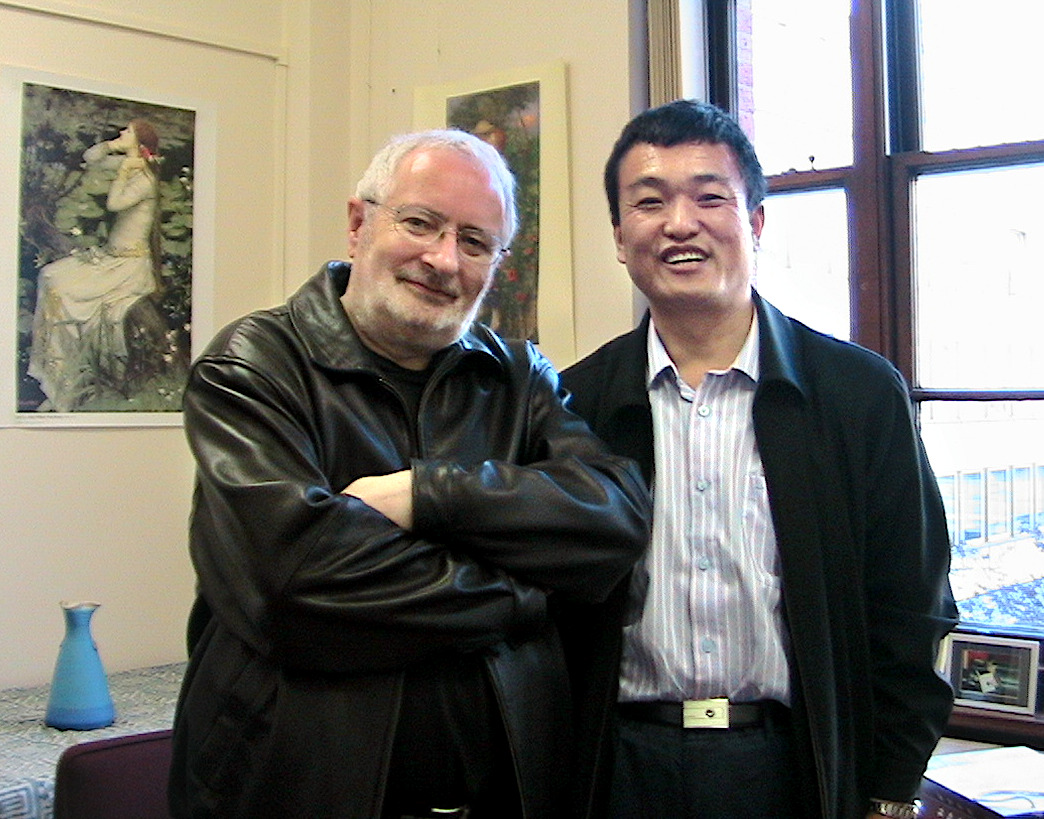
Eagleton in 2012

In late 2007, a critique of Martin Amis included in the introduction to a 2007 edition of Eagleton's book Ideology was widely reprinted in the British press. In it, Eagleton took issue with Amis' widely quoted writings on "Islamism", directing particular attention to one specific passage from an interview with Ginny Dougary published in The Times on 9 September 2006.

What can we do to raise the price of them doing this? There's a definite urge – don't you have it? – to say, 'The Muslim community will have to suffer until it gets its house in order.' What sort of suffering? Not letting them travel. Deportation – further down the road. Curtailing of freedoms. Strip-searching people who look like they're from the Middle East or from Pakistan ... Discriminatory stuff, until it hurts the whole community and they start getting tough with their children ... It's a huge dereliction on their part.

Eagleton criticised Amis and expressed surprise as to its source, stating: "[these are] not the ramblings of a British National Party thug ... but the reflections of Martin Amis, leading luminary of the English metropolitan literary world." He drew a connection between Amis and his father (the novelist Kingsley Amis). Eagleton went on to write that Martin Amis had learned more from his father – whom Eagleton described as a reactionary "racist, anti-Semitic boor, a drink-sodden, self-hating reviler of women, gays and liberals" – than merely "how to turn a shapely phrase." Eagleton added there was "something rather stomach-churning at the sight of those such as Amis and his political allies, champions of a civilisation that for centuries has wreaked untold carnage throughout the world, shrieking for illegal measures when they find themselves for the first time on the sticky end of the same treatment."

The essay became a cause célèbre in British literary circles. Yasmin Alibhai-Brown, a commentator for The Independent, wrote an article about the affair, to which Amis responded via open letter, calling Eagleton "an ideological relict ... unable to get out of bed in the morning without the dual guidance of God and Karl Marx." Amis said the views Eagleton attributed to him as his considered opinion was in fact his spoken description of a tempting urge, in relation to the need to "raise the price" of terrorist actions. Eagleton's personal comments on Kingsley Amis prompted a further response from Kingsley's widow, the novelist Elizabeth Jane Howard. Howard wrote to The Daily Telegraph, noting that for a supposed "anti-semitic homophobe", it was peculiar that the only guests at the Howard–Amis nuptials were either Jewish or gay. As Howard explained, "Kingsley was never a racist, nor an anti-Semitic boor. Our four great friends who witnessed our wedding were three Jews and one homosexual." Colin Howard, Howard's homosexual brother, called Eagleton "a little squirt", adding that Sir Kingsley, far from being homophobic, had extended an affectionate friendship to him and helped him come to terms with his sexuality.

Eagleton defended his comments about Martin and Kingsley Amis in The Guardian, claiming the main bone of contention – the substance of Amis' remarks and views – had been lost amid the media furore.

== Critical reactions ==
William Deresiewicz wrote of After Theory, Eagleton's book, as follows:

[I]s it that hard to explain what Eagleton's up to? The prolificness, the self-plagiarism, the snappy, highly consumable prose and, of course, the sales figures: Eagleton wishes for capitalism's demise, but as long as it's here, he plans to do as well as he can out of it. Someone who owns three homes shouldn't be preaching self-sacrifice, and someone whose careerism at Oxbridge was legendary shouldn't be telling interviewers of his longstanding regret at having turned down a job at the Open University.

The novelist and critic David Lodge, writing in the May 2004 New York Review of Books on Theory and After Theory, concluded:

Some of Theory's achievements are genuine and permanent additions to knowledge, or intellectual self-knowledge. Eagleton is quite right to assert that we can never go back to a state of pre-Theory innocence about the transparency of language or the ideological neutrality of interpretation ... But like all fashions it was bound to have a limited life of novelty and vitality, and we are now living through its decadence without any clear indication of what will supersede it. Theory has, in short, become boringly predictable to many people who were once enthusiastic about it, and that After Theory is most interesting when its focus is furthest from its nominal subject is perhaps evidence that Terry Eagleton is now bored by it too.

Jonathan Bate stressed the importance of Eagleton's Catholic background in "Saint Terence", a 1991 review-essay in the London Review of Books before the overt religious turn in Eagleton's later works.

== Personal life ==
Eagleton has been married twice. His first marriage was to Rosemary Galpin, a nurse, between 1966 and 1976. He was then in a relationship with Norwegian literary critic Toril Moi for ten years. His second marriage was to American academic Willa Murphy in 1997. They have since divorced. Eagleton has five children, including the journalist Oliver Eagleton. He claims never to have used the internet or sent an email.

== Publications ==
- The New Left Church [as Terence Eagleton] (1966)
- Shakespeare and Society: Critical Studies in Shakespearean Drama (1967)
- Exiles and Émigrés: Studies in Modern Literature (1970)
- The Body as Language: Outline of a New Left Theology (1970)
- Myths of Power: A Marxist Study of the Brontës (1975)
- Criticism & Ideology (1976)
- Marxism and Literary Criticism (1976)
- Walter Benjamin, or Towards a Revolutionary Criticism (1981)
- The Rape of Clarissa: Writing, Sexuality, and Class Struggle in Samuel Richardson (1982)
- Literary Theory: An Introduction (1983)
- The Function of Criticism (1984)
- Saints and Scholars (1987; a novel)
- Raymond Williams: Critical Perspectives (1989; editor)
- Saint Oscar (1989; a play about Oscar Wilde)
- The Significance of Theory (1989)
- The Ideology of the Aesthetic (1990)
- Nationalism, Colonialism, and Literature (1990)
- Ideology: An Introduction (1991; revised edition: 2007)
- Wittgenstein: The Terry Eagleton Script, The Derek Jarman Film (1993)
- Literary Theory (1996)
- The Illusions of Postmodernism (1996)
- Heathcliff and the Great Hunger (1996)
- Marx and Freedom (1997)
- Crazy John and the Bishop and Other Essays on Irish Culture (1998)
- The Idea of Culture (2000)
- The Truth about the Irish (2001)
- The Gatekeeper: A Memoir (2002)
- Sweet Violence: The Idea of the Tragic (2003)
- After Theory (2003)
- Figures of Dissent: Reviewing Fish, Spivak, Zizek and Others (2003)
- The English Novel: An Introduction (2005)
- Holy Terror (2005)
- The Meaning of Life (2007)
- How to Read a Poem (2007)
- Trouble with Strangers: A Study of Ethics (2008)
- Literary Theory, Anniversary Edition (2008)
- Reason, Faith, and Revolution: Reflections on the God Debate (2009)
- The Task of the Critic: Terry Eagleton in Dialogue with Matthew Beaumont (2009)
- On Evil (2010)
- Why Marx Was Right (2011)
- The Event of Literature (2012)
- Across the Pond: An Englishman's View of America (2013)
- How to Read Literature (2013)
- Culture and the Death of God (2014)
- Hope without Optimism (2015)
- Culture (2016)
- Materialism (2017)
- Radical Sacrifice (2018)
- Humour (2019)
- Tragedy (2020)
- Critical Revolutionaries: Five Critics Who Changed the Way We Read (2022)
- The Real Thing: Reflections on a Literary Form (2024)
- Modernism: A Literature in Crisis (2025)
- A Death of One’s Own: Reflections on Mortality (2026)

== See also ==
- Christian communism
- Marxist cultural analysis

Academic offices
Preceded by Ahmad Dallal	Terry Lecturer; 2008	Succeeded by Donald S. Lopez Jr.
Preceded by Michael Gazzaniga	Gifford Lecturer at the University of Edinburgh; 2010	Succeeded by Patricia Churchland
Awards
Preceded by Boris Kagarlitsky	Deutscher Memorial Prize; 1989	Succeeded by Arno J. Mayer
