= Literary Theory: An Introduction =

1983 book by Terry Eagleton

- First edition
- Author: Terry Eagleton
- Subject: Literary theory
- Publisher: Blackwell
- Publication date: 1983

Literary Theory: An Introduction is a 1983 book by Terry Eagleton that overviews and responds to modern literary theory.

== Bibliography ==
- Bialostosky, Don (1986). "The English Professor in the Age of Theory". Novel: A Forum on Fiction. 19 (2): 164–170. doi:10.2307/1345551. ISSN 0029-5132. JSTOR 1345551.
- Cain, William E. (1986). "Review of Literary Theory: An Introduction". Comparative Literature. 38 (4): 362–366. doi:10.2307/1770397. ISSN 0010-4124. JSTOR 1770397.
- Clark, Priscilla P. (1984). "Review of Literary Theory: An Introduction". Contemporary Sociology. 13 (4): 452. doi:10.2307/2069066. ISSN 0094-3061. JSTOR 2069066.
- Culler, Jonathan (1984). "Review of Literary Theory: An Introduction". Poetics Today. 5 (1): 149–156. doi:10.2307/1772431. ISSN 0333-5372. JSTOR 1772431.
- Forgacs, David (1984). "Review of Literary Theory: An Introduction". Poetics Today. 5 (2): 429–433. doi:10.2307/1771940. ISSN 0333-5372. JSTOR 1771940.
- Hansford, H. J. (1985). "Review of Literary Theory. An Introduction; Reconstructing Literature". The Review of English Studies. 36 (144): 615–616. doi:10.1093/res/XXXVI.144.615. ISSN 0034-6551. JSTOR 516903.
- Herman, David (1998). "Review of Literary Theory: An Introduction". SubStance. 27 (2): 139–142. doi:10.2307/3685658. ISSN 0049-2426. JSTOR 3685658.
- Holub, Robert C. (1985). "Review of Literary Theory: An Introduction". The German Quarterly. 58 (3): 440–442. doi:10.2307/406575. ISSN 0016-8831. JSTOR 406575.
- Hutcheon, Linda (1983). "A Poetics of Postmodernism?". Diacritics. 13 (4): 33–42. doi:10.2307/464710. ISSN 0300-7162. JSTOR 464710.
- Johnston, Kenneth (1985). "Review of The Crisis in Criticism: Theory, Literature, and Reform in English Studies; Literary Theory: An Introduction; Criticism and Social Change". College English. 47 (4): 407–419. doi:10.2307/376965. ISSN 0010-0994. JSTOR 376965.
- Kellman, Steven G. (1984). "Review of Reconstructing Literature; Literary Theory: An Introduction; The Politics of Interpretation; The Womb of Space: The Cross-Cultural Imagination. Contributions in Afro-American and African Studies 73". Modern Fiction Studies. 30 (2): 399–403. ISSN 0026-7724. JSTOR 26281110.
- Moseley, Merritt (1988). "Victorian Convention and Complexity". The Sewanee Review. 96 (2): 243–250. ISSN 0037-3052. JSTOR 27545887.
- "Review of Literary Theory: An Introduction". The Wilson Quarterly. 7 (5): 151–152. 1983. ISSN 0363-3276. JSTOR 40257569.
- Ryan, Michael (1984). "Review of Literary Theory: An Introduction". SubStance. 13 (3/4): 134–136. doi:10.2307/3684780. ISSN 0049-2426. JSTOR 3684780.
- Selden, Raman (1985). "Review of Literary Theory: An Introduction". The Modern Language Review. 80 (2): 396–398. doi:10.2307/3728671. ISSN 0026-7937. JSTOR 3728671.
- Stivale, Charles J. (1985). "Review of Literary Theory: An Introduction". The French Review. 58 (4): 572–573. ISSN 0016-111X. JSTOR 392825.
- Thomas, Ronald R. (1985). "Review of Literary Theory: An Introduction". Modern Philology. 83 (1): 104–108. doi:10.1086/391449. ISSN 0026-8232. JSTOR 437428.
- Van Leer, David (1984). "The Bourgeois Theorist". American Quarterly. 36 (2): 291–296. doi:10.2307/2712729. ISSN 0003-0678. JSTOR 2712729.
