= Ken Hirschkop =

Ken Hirschkop is a professor in the Department of English Language and Literature at the University of Waterloo in Canada, and the author of several books about Mikhail Bakhtin, a Russian philosopher, literary critic and scholar.

== Publications ==
Hirschkop's books include:

- Mikhail Bakhtin: An Aesthetic for Democracy (Oxford University Press, 1999),
- Bakhtin and Cultural Theory (2nd ed., Manchester University Press, 2001, edited with David Shepherd)
- Benjamin's 'Arcades': An Unguided Tour (Manchester University Press, 2005, with Peter Buse, Scott McCracken and Bertrand Taithe),
- Linguistic Turns, 1890–1950: Writing on Language & Social Theory (Oxford University Press, 2019)
- The Cambridge Introduction to Mikhail Bakhtin (Cambridge University Press, 2021)
