= News from Nowhere: Journal of the Oxford English Faculty Opposition =

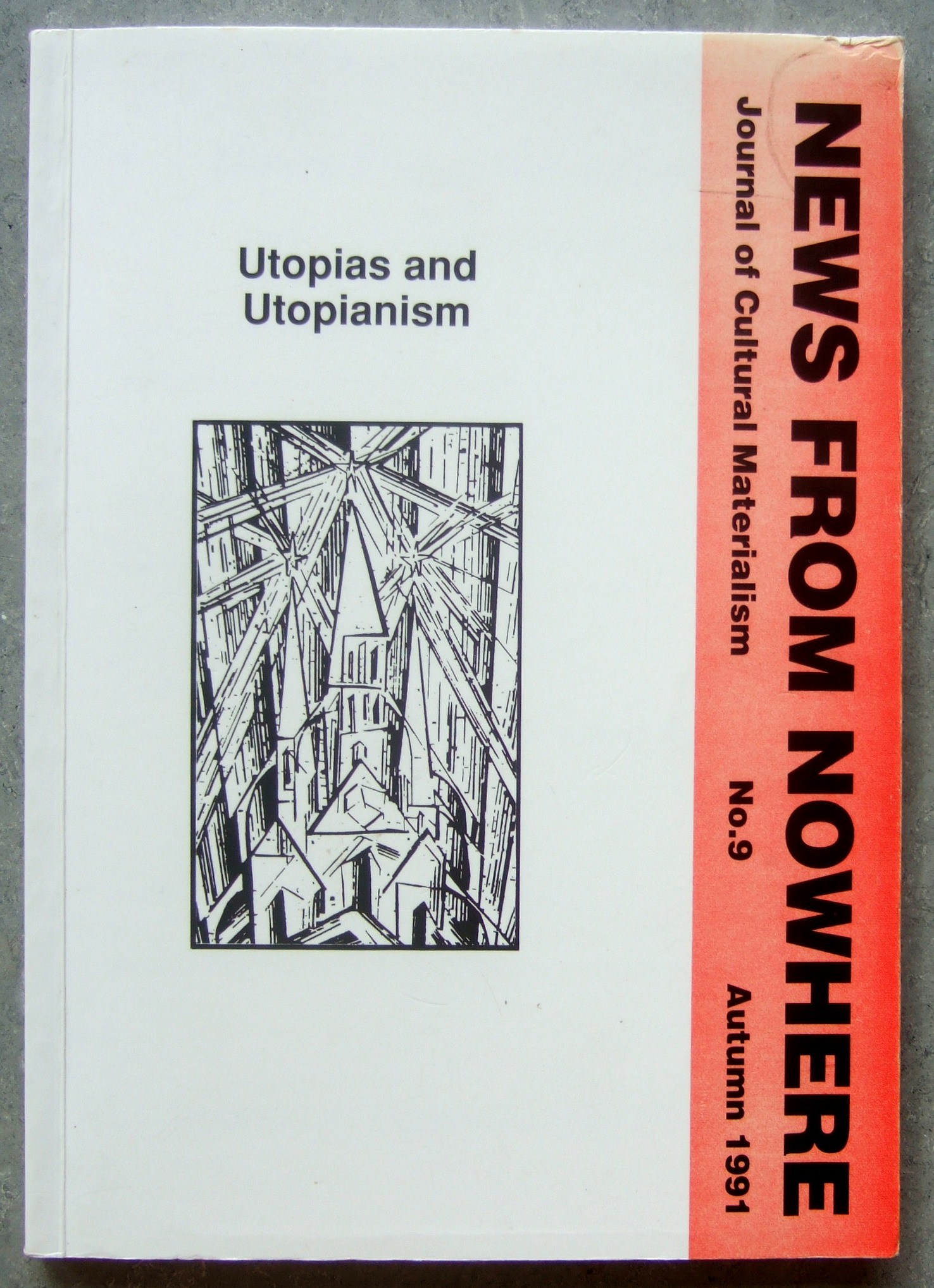
News from Nowhere no 9, Utopias special issue.

News from Nowhere (ISSN 0957-1868) was the journal of Oxford English Limited (OEL), a left-wing group of students and dons who sought progressive reforms to the Oxford University English Faculty syllabus between 1982 and 1992. News from Nowhere was created and edited by Tony Pinkney and ran for nine issues from 1986 to 1991.

== History ==
The first issue of News from Nowhere was published in April 1986. The first four issues mostly fought out the polemic with the Oxford English Faculty; issues 5 to 9 were thematically centered on pressing general issues in literary and cultural theory. As Josephine M. Guy and Ian Small note in their Politics and Value in English Studies: "There has been a long-standing debate in the Oxford periodical News from Nowhere about the future of English studies within that university". The last issue of the magazine, number 9, appeared in Autumn 1991. Throughout its lifetime the magazine was published twice a year.

Sets of News from Nowhere are available in the Bodleian Library, Oxford, Cambridge University Library, and the University of London Library; and a one-volume selection from the journal was forthcoming from Kelmsgarth Press in 2015.
