= Hampshire Yeomanry =

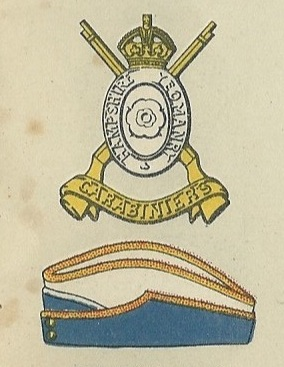
- Badge and service cap as worn at the outbreak of World War II
- Active: 1794 – present day
- Country: Kingdom of Great Britain (1794 – 1800); United Kingdom (1800 – 1969)
- Branch: British Army
- Type: Yeomanry
- Role: Cavalry; Field Artillery; Anti-Aircraft Artillery
- Size: One Regiment
- Engagements: Second Boer War; World War I World War II
- Battle honours: See below

The Hampshire Yeomanry was a yeomanry cavalry regiment formed by amalgamating older units raised between 1794 and 1803 during the French Revolutionary Wars. It served in a mounted role in the Second Boer War and World War I, and in the air defence role during and after World War II. The lineage is continued by 295 (Hampshire Yeomanry) Battery and 457 (Hampshire Carabiniers Yeomanry) Battery, batteries of 106 (Yeomanry) Regiment Royal Artillery, part of the Army Reserve.

== French Revolutionary and Napoleonic Wars ==
After Britain was drawn into the French Revolutionary Wars in 1793, Prime Minister William Pitt the Younger proposed on 14 March 1794 that the counties form a force of Volunteer Yeoman Cavalry (Yeomanry) that could be called on by the King to defend the country against invasion or by the Lord Lieutenant to subdue any civil disorder within the country. By the end of the year 27 counties had raised Yeomanry, including Hampshire. Between 1794 and the Treaty of Amiens in 1802, the following independent troops of Yeomanry were raised in Hampshire and the Isle of Wight:

- North Hampshire Yeomanry Cavalry, troop raised at Basingstoke 31 May 1794, (Note: Possibly the same as 'Basingstoke, Mr Lefevre's Cavalry', two troops raised (probably by Charles Shaw-Lefevre, later MP and Lt-Col of the North Hampshire Yeomanry) 31 May 1794.) increased to three troops 1795, reduced to one troop 1799, disbanded 1802
- South Hampshire Cavalry, troop raised at Christchurch 5 June 1794, increased to two troops 1798, disbanded 1802
- New Forest Volunteer Cavalry, two troops raised 5 June 1794, redesignated New Forest Rangers 1797, disbanded 1802 (Note: The New Forest Rangers may have been reformed in 1803.)
- South East Hampshire Cavalry, troop raised at Portsdown 28 April 1795, increased to two troops 1797, disbanded 1802
- Alton and Petersfield Cavalry, raised 10 May 1796, disbanded 1802
- Southampton Cavalry, raised 2 March 1797, disbanded 1802 (Note: The Southampton Cavalry may have been reformed in 1803.)
- Fawley Light Dragoons, raised March 1797, disbanded 1802
- East Medina Cavalry, one troop raised 19 April 1798, disbanded 1802
- Ringwood Cavalry, raised 12 May 1798, disbanded 1802
- West Medina Cavalry, one troop raised 17 May 1798, disbanded 1802
- Fordingbridge Cavalry, raised 31 May 1798, disbanded 1802
- Bramdean Association Cavalry, raised 25 July 1798, disbanded later
- Wickham Cavalry, raised 28 July 1798, disbanded later
- Bere Forest Cavalry, raised 17 October 1798, disbanded 1802
- Isle of Wight Cavalry, troop raised 27 March 1800, disbanded 1802

The Peace of Amiens was short-lived and Britain declared war on France again in May 1803, beginning the Napoleonic Wars. The county Yeomanry was quickly reformed, including the following units in Hampshire:

- North Hampshire Yeomanry Cavalry, two troops reformed 6 September 1802, increased to four troops 1803, reduced to two troops 1806
- South Hampshire Cavalry, eight troops reformed 6 September 1802
- South East Hampshire Cavalry, four troops reformed 9 May 1803
- North East Hampshire, or Alton Cavalry, reformed as two troops from Alton and Petersfield Cavalry 6 September 1802, increased to three troops 1803
- Fawley Light Dragoons, troop reformed 6 September 1802
- Isle of Wight Cavalry, formed 25 March 1805 from East and West Medina Cavalry (both reformed 13 August 1802)
- Ringwood Cavalry, two troops reformed 1 September 1803
- Fordingbridge Cavalry, troop reformed 1 September 1803
- Bere Forest Cavalry, troop reformed 26 July 1803
- Dogmersfield Cavalry, troop raised 8 August 1803
- Whitchurch Cavalry, troop raised 8 August 1803

== 19th century ==
The Yeomanry declined in importance and strength after the end of the French wars. All the troops of Hampshire Yeomanry were disbanded in 1828, but civil unrest in 1830 led to the revival of the Yeomanry. The following new independent troops were raised in Hampshire in 1830–1:

- North Hampshire Yeomanry Cavalry, raised 30 November 1830
- Valley of Avon and North Avon Yeomanry Cavalry, raised 7 December 1830
- South Avon Yeomanry Cavalry
- Lymington Yeomanry Cavalry, raised 9 December 1830
- Fordingbridge Yeomanry Cavalry, raised December 1830
- Romsey Yeomanry Cavalry, raised 27 January 1831
- New Forest East Yeomanry Cavalry, raised 22 January 1831
- New Forest West Yeomanry Cavalry, raised 8 February 1831
- Andover Yeomanry Cavalry, raised 27 December 1831

Charles Shaw-Lefevre of Heckfield Place, MP for North Hampshire, son of the first commanding officer of the North Hampshire Yeomanry, was appointed Commandant of that unit on 19 February 1831, and became the Yeomanry's Honorary Lieutenant-Colonel on 16 June 1868 (by which time he had been ennobled as Viscount Eversley).

In 1834 the troops in north Hampshire were regimented to form the North Hampshire Regiment of Yeomanry Cavalry. In 1838 the regiment and the troops at Andover and Lymington continued without pay, while all the other troops were disbanded. In 1841 the regiment was converted to Hussars and dropped the 'North' part of its title in 1848, when regimental headquarters (RHQ) was at Winchester. In the 1850s it absorbed the Andover and Lymington troops. In 1887 it received the title of Hampshire Yeomanry (Carabiniers) (carabiniers being a form of mounted riflemen), and adopted crossed carbines as its badge. On 1 April 1893 its troops were organised into squadrons and RHQ moved to Southampton (though it returned to Sussex Street in Winchester by 1899).

Following the Cardwell Reforms a mobilisation scheme began to appear in the Army List from December 1875. This assigned Regular and Yeomanry units places in an order of battle of corps, divisions and brigades for the 'Active Army', even though these formations were entirely theoretical, with no staff or services assigned. The Hampshire Yeomanry were assigned to the Cavalry Brigade of II Corps based at Lewes, alongside three Regular cavalry regiments and a Royal Horse Artillery battery stationed at Aldershot. This was never more than a paper organisation, but from April 1893 the Army List showed the Yeomanry regiments grouped into brigades for collective training. They were commanded by the senior regimental commanding officer but they did have a Regular Army brigade-major. The Hampshire Carabiniers together with the Dorset Yeomanry formed the Portsmouth Brigade. The Yeomanry brigades disappeared from the Army List after the Second Boer War.

Viscount Eversley was succeeded as CO in 1868 by his son-in-law, Sir Henry St John-Mildmay, 5th Baronet of Dogmersfield Park, a former Major in the 2nd Dragoon Guards (Queen's Bays). Lieutenant-Colonel the Hon Sir Henry Crichton, son of the 3rd Earl Erne, and a retired officer in the 21st Hussars, was commanding officer (CO) from 1884 to 1895. He later served as the regiment's Honorary Colonel and as chairman of the Hampshire Territorial Association.

== Second Boer War ==
Due to the string of defeats during Black Week in December 1899, the British government realized they were going to need more troops than just the regular army to fight the Second Boer War. On 13 December, the decision to allow volunteer forces serve in the field was made, and a Royal Warrant was issued on 24 December. This officially created the Imperial Yeomanry (IY). The Royal Warrant asked standing Yeomanry regiments to provide service companies of approximately 115 men each. In addition to this, many British citizens (usually mid-upper class) volunteered to join the new force.

The first contingent of recruits contained 550 officers, 10,371 men with 20 battalions and 4 companies. The first company left Southampton on 31 January 1900, bound for Cape Town, and the whole first contingent arrived in South Africa between February and April. Upon arrival, the IY battalions were sent throughout the zone of operations.

The Hampshire Yeomanry raised two service companies for the IY: 41st (Hampshire) Company, which arrived in South Africa on 23 February 1900 and served in 12th Battalion, IY, until 1902 when it transferred to 4th Battalion; and 50th (Hampshire) Company, which landed at Beira, Mozambique, on 4 May 1900 and served with 17th Battalion. In May and June 1900, 12th Battalion, IY, was in Lord Roberts's army, while the 17th was in Lt-Gen Carrington's Rhodesian Field Force. The Hampshire IY companies served until 1901, earning the regiment its first Battle honour: South Africa 1900–01.

The Imperial Yeomanry were trained and equipped as mounted infantry. After the Boer War all Yeomanry regiments were termed Imperial Yeomanry until 1907.

== Territorial Force ==
The Imperial Yeomanry were subsumed into the new Territorial Force (TF) under the Haldane Reforms of 1908. The Hampshire Yeomanry were trained and equipped as dragoons, and organised as follows:

- RHQ at Hyde Close drill hall, Winchester
- A Squadron at Portsmouth, with detachments at Freshwater, Newport, Ryde, Petersfield and Titchfield
- B Squadron at Winchester, with detachments at Alton, Aldershot, Basingstoke and Bishop's Waltham
- C Squadron at Southampton, with detachments at Eastleigh, Andover and Romsey
- D Squadron at Bournemouth, with detachments at Stuckton, Highcliffe, Burley and Beaulieu

The Hampshire Yeomanry formed part of the TF's 1st South Western Mounted Brigade.

== World War I ==
=== Mobilisation ===
The Hampshire Yeomanry were mobilised at Winchester on the outbreak of war on 4 August 1914. The Commanding Officer since 20 June 1907 was Lt-Col J.E.B. 'Jack' Seely, MP, who had recently resigned as Secretary of State for War. On the outbreak of war he joined Sir John French's staff, and later commanded the Canadian Cavalry Brigade in action.

Under the Territorial and Reserve Forces Act 1907 (7 Edw. 7, c.9) which brought the TF into being, it was intended to be a home defence force for service during wartime and members could not be compelled to serve outside the country. However, after the outbreak of war, TF units were invited to volunteer for 'Imperial Service'. On 15 August 1914, the War Office issued instructions to separate those men who had signed up for Home Service only, and form these into reserve units. On 31 August, the formation of a reserve or 2nd Line unit was authorised for each 1st Line unit where 60 per cent or more of the men had volunteered for Overseas Service. The titles of these 2nd Line units would be the same as the original, but distinguished by a '2/' prefix. In this way duplicate battalions, brigades and divisions were created, mirroring those TF formations being sent overseas. Later, a 3rd Line was formed to act as a reserve, providing trained replacements for the 1st and 2nd Line regiments.

=== 1/1st Hampshire Yeomanry ===
After mobilisation the 1st Line regiment went to its war station in the Portsmouth defences with the 1st South Western Mounted Brigade and in October it moved with the brigade to the Forest Row area, and finally in October 1915 to Eastbourne. In March 1916, the regiment was split up to provide divisional cavalry squadrons to 2nd Line TF formations embarking to join the British Expeditionary Force (BEF) fighting on the Western Front:

- Regimental HQ and B Squadron joined 60th (2/2nd London) Division at Warminster on 26 April 1916 and landed at Le Havre on 25 June. Three days later, the RHQ joined IX Corps Cavalry Regiment along with C Squadron and A and B Squadrons, Royal Wiltshire Yeomanry at Bailleul. B Squadron was attached to the 1/1st Yorkshire Hussars as XVII Corps Cavalry Regiment from 8 July and Cavalry Corps Troops from 5 September. It rejoined the regiment on 19 January 1917.
- A Squadron joined 58th (2/1st London) Division at Ipswich on 21 March 1916. It moved to the Sutton Veny area in July 1916 and landed at Le Havre on 20 January 1917. Five days later it rejoined the regiment in IX Corps Cavalry Regiment at Bailleul.
- C Squadron joined 61st (2nd South Midland) Division at Ludgershall on 18 March 1916 and landed at Le Havre on 25 May. From 31 May to 16 June it was attached to the 1st Cavalry Division before rejoining the regiment.

IX Corps Cavalry Regiment was formed on 28 June 1916 with the RHQ and C Squadron of the Hampshire Yeomanry, and A and B Squadrons, Royal Wiltshire Yeomanry at Bailleul. In November the Wiltshire squadrons departed and A and B Squadrons, Hampshire Yeomanry joined in January 1917 to complete the regiment.

The Hampshire Yeomanry left IX Corps on 25 July 1917 and on 26 August it was dismounted and sent to No. 3 Infantry Base Depot at Rouen for training as infantry. On 27 September 1917, a draft of 12 officers and 307 men were absorbed into the 15th (Service) Battalion (2nd Portsmouth), Hampshire Regiment, at Caëstre. This was a 'Kitchener's Army battalion serving in 122nd Brigade of 41st Division, which had just come out of the fighting at Battle of Passchendaele. On 8 October a further 119 other ranks of the Hampshire Yeomanry joined the battalion, which was redesignated 15th (Hampshire Carabiniers) Battalion, Hampshire Regiment. On 12 November 1917, it moved to the Italian Front with the division, arriving at Mantua on 17 November. It returned to the Western Front in between 1 and 5 May 1918 and remained there, in 122nd Brigade, 41st Division, until the end of the war. By the Armistice it had reached the Dendre.

=== 2/1st Hampshire Yeomanry ===
The 2nd Line regiment was formed at Winchester in October 1914. In May 1915 it was with 2/1st South Western Mounted Brigade at Calne and moved in September to Canterbury, to Maresfield in October and then to Tiptree in March 1916. On 31 March 1916, the remaining Mounted Brigades were ordered to be numbered in a single sequence and the brigade became the 15th Mounted Brigade and joined 4th Mounted Division.

In July 1916, the 4th Mounted Division was renamed 2nd Cyclist Division and the regiment was converted to a Bicycle infantry unit in 6th Cyclist Brigade. In August 1916 it was at Preston near Canterbury. In November 1916 the division was broken up into individual brigades and 2/1st Hampshire Yeomanry moved to Ipswich and merged with the 2/1st Berkshire Yeomanry to form 11th (Hampshire and Berkshire) Yeomanry Cyclist Regiment in 4th Cyclist Brigade. In February 1917 it was at Coltishall and was part of 5th (Hampshire and West Somerset) Yeomanry Cyclist Regiment (with 2/1st West Somerset Yeomanry) in 2nd Cyclist Brigade. In March 1917 it resumed its identity as 2/1st Hampshire Yeomanry and by October 1917 it was at Reepham, Norfolk. On 16 May 1918, the regiment landed in Dublin and was posted to Maryborough (now Portlaoise) with companies at Tullamore and Birr, still in 2nd Cyclist Brigade; there was no further change before the end of the war.

=== 3/1st Hampshire Yeomanry ===
The 3rd Line regiment was formed in 1915; in the summer it was affiliated to the 11th Reserve Cavalry Regiment at Tidworth. Early in 1917 it was absorbed into the 4th Reserve Cavalry Regiment, at Aldershot. By 1918 it had left the 4th Reserve Cavalry Regiment when the 1st Line had been converted to infantry. It joined the 4th (Reserve) Battalion of the Hampshire Regiment at Larkhill.

== Between the wars ==
=== Artillery conversion ===
On 1 June 1920, the Regiment was reconstituted with HQ at Winchester. Following the experience of the war, it was decided that only the fourteen most senior yeomanry regiments would be retained as horsed cavalry, with the rest being transferred to other roles. As a result, the regiment was converted into a battery of the Royal Field Artillery (RFA) in 1920 and amalgamated with the Hampshire Royal Horse Artillery to form 7th (Hampshire) Army Brigade, RFA. When the TF was converted into the Territorial Army (TA) the following year, it was redesignated 95th (Hampshire Yeomanry) Army Brigade, RFA. In 1924 the RFA was subsumed into the Royal Artillery (RA) and the unit became an Army Field Brigade, RA, with the following organisation:

- HQ at Hyde Close, Winchester
- 377th (Hampshire) at Hyde Close, Winchester
- 378th (Hampshire Yeomanry) Bty at Hamilton House, Commercial Road, Southampton

In 1927 the 55th (Wessex) Field Brigade was completely reorganised and its two Hampshire batteries (originally constituting 2nd Wessex Brigade, RFA) transferred to the 95th. The expanded unit was no longer an 'Army' field brigade, but took the 55th's place in 43rd (Wessex) Division, with the following organisation:

- HQ at Hyde Close, Winchester
- 377th (Winchester) Field Bty at Hyde Close, Winchester
- 378th (Hampshire RHA) Field Bty at Hamilton House, Commercial Road, Southampton
- 218th (Hampshire) Field Bty at Bournemouth – from 55th (Wessex) Fd Bde
- 219th (Hampshire) Field Bty (Howitzers) at Newport, Isle of Wight – from 55th (Wessex) Fd Bde

The battery titles were quite fluid at this time: in 1929, 219 Bty was redesignated 'Isle of Wight'; later it moved to Albert Road, Cosham, and took 'Cosham' as its subtitle. By 1934, 218 Bty had been redesignated 'Bournemouth', and in 1937 the brigade dropped the 'Yeomanry' part of its subtitle.

The Hon Patrick Seely, third son of the regiment's Hon Colonel, Maj-Gen 'Jack' Seely, 1st Lord Mottistone (and grandson of Mottistone's predecessor in that role, Sir Henry Crichton) was commissioned as a Second lieutenant in 95th Hampshire Yeomanry RA in 1931. He later served as Lt-Col of 57th (Wessex) HAA Rgt.

=== Anti-Aircraft Conversion ===
At the end of the 1930s when war with Germany was again imminent, the need for improved anti-aircraft (AA) defences for Britain's cities became apparent, and a programme of converting existing TA units was pushed forward. On 1 October 1937 95th Field Brigade became 72nd (Hampshire) Anti-Aircraft Brigade, Royal Artillery (Anti-Aircraft Regiment from 1939) with the following organisation:

- Regimental HQ at Hamilton House, Commercial Road, Southampton
- 217th (Hampshire Carabiniers) AA Battery at Hyde Close, Winchester
- 218th (Hampshire RHA) AA Battery at Southampton
- 310th AA Battery, formed 1 April 1939 at Parkstone, Dorsetshire

(The two former Wessex batteries transferred to 57th (Wessex) AA Brigade and 94th (Queen's Own Dorset Yeomanry) Field Brigade.)

== World War II ==
=== Mobilisation ===
The TA's AA units were mobilised on 23 September 1938 during the Munich Crisis, with units manning their emergency positions within 24 hours, even though many did not yet have their full complement of men or equipment. The emergency lasted three weeks, and they were stood down on 13 October. In February 1939 the existing AA defences came under the control of a new Anti-Aircraft Command. In June, as the international situation worsened, a partial mobilisation of the TA was begun in a process known as 'couverture', whereby each AA unit did a month's tour of duty in rotation to man selected AA gun positions. On 24 August, ahead of the declaration of war, AA Command was fully mobilised at its war stations.

72nd (Hampshire) AA Regiment mobilised in 35th AA Brigade under 5th AA Division. 35 AA Brigade was responsible for the Gun Defence Area (GDA) protecting the city and naval base of Portsmouth. In September 1939, the brigade had 29 heavy AA guns round the city. On 1 June 1940 the AA regiments of the RA equipped with 3-inch or larger guns were designated Heavy AA (HAA) to distinguish them from the newer Light AA (LAA) units being formed. By July 1940, when the Battle of Britain began, there were 44 HAA guns deployed in the Portsmouth GDA.

=== Battle of Britain and Blitz ===
The regiment was heavily engaged throughout the Battle of Britain. A few bombers got through to Portsmouth on 10 July, and the Portsmouth and Southampton AA guns were in action on 15 August, claiming one 'kill'. Again, on 18 August, German air raids crossed Southern England and attacked RAF airfields in the afternoon. The guns of 35 AA Bde and its neighbours were in action and accounted for 23 enemy aircraft. On 24 August a raid eluded RAF Fighter Command's fighters and bombed Portsmouth city and dockyard badly, killing over 100 people despite the efforts of the AA guns, although another raid two days later was driven off by fighters and AA fire, and only dropped a few bombs on the outskirts of the city. This was the start of the Portsmouth Blitz.

After 15 September, the intensity of Luftwaffe daylight attacks fell, and the emphasis switched to night bombing of industrial towns (The Blitz). Portsmouth was a major target: during a succession of attacks, two bombs fell on a gun position of 35 AA Bde, killing an officer and 10 men, wrecking the command post and one gun. Two of the remaining guns continued to fire by improvised methods. The city was badly bombed on the nights of 5 December 1940, 10 January, 10 March, 17 and 27 April 1941.

The regiment sent a cadre to 205th Training Regiment at Aborfield to provide the basis for a new 393 HAA Bty; this was formed on 12 December 1940 and joined the regiment on 25 February 1941. Later the regiment sent another cadre to 205th Training Regiment for a new 438 HAA Bty; this was formed on 12 June 1941 and joined the regiment on 4 September 1941 to replace 310 HAA Bty, which left to provide an experienced cadre for the newly raised 131st HAA Rgt, a 'Mixed' unit including women of the Auxiliary Territorial Service that was forming in 35 AA Bde. Meanwhile, 217 HAA Bty was attached to 27 (Home Counties) AA Bde, which controlled the searchlight array around Portsmouth. 72nd (Hampshire) HAA Rgt remained with 35 AA Bde throughout this period.

=== Mobile training ===
In January 1942, 72nd (Hampshire) HAA Rgt left AA Command and joined the War Office Reserve with 217, 218 and 393 HAA Btys. This was usually a precursor to mobile training for service overseas. In between training, these units were lent back to AA Command, and by May the regiment was with 28 (Thames & Medway) AA Bde in 6 AA Division protecting the approaches to London, then in June moved to newly formed 71 AA Bde in 6 AA Division. In July 1942 it became an unbrigaded regiment, leaving AA Command entirely by mid-August when it came under direct War Office control.

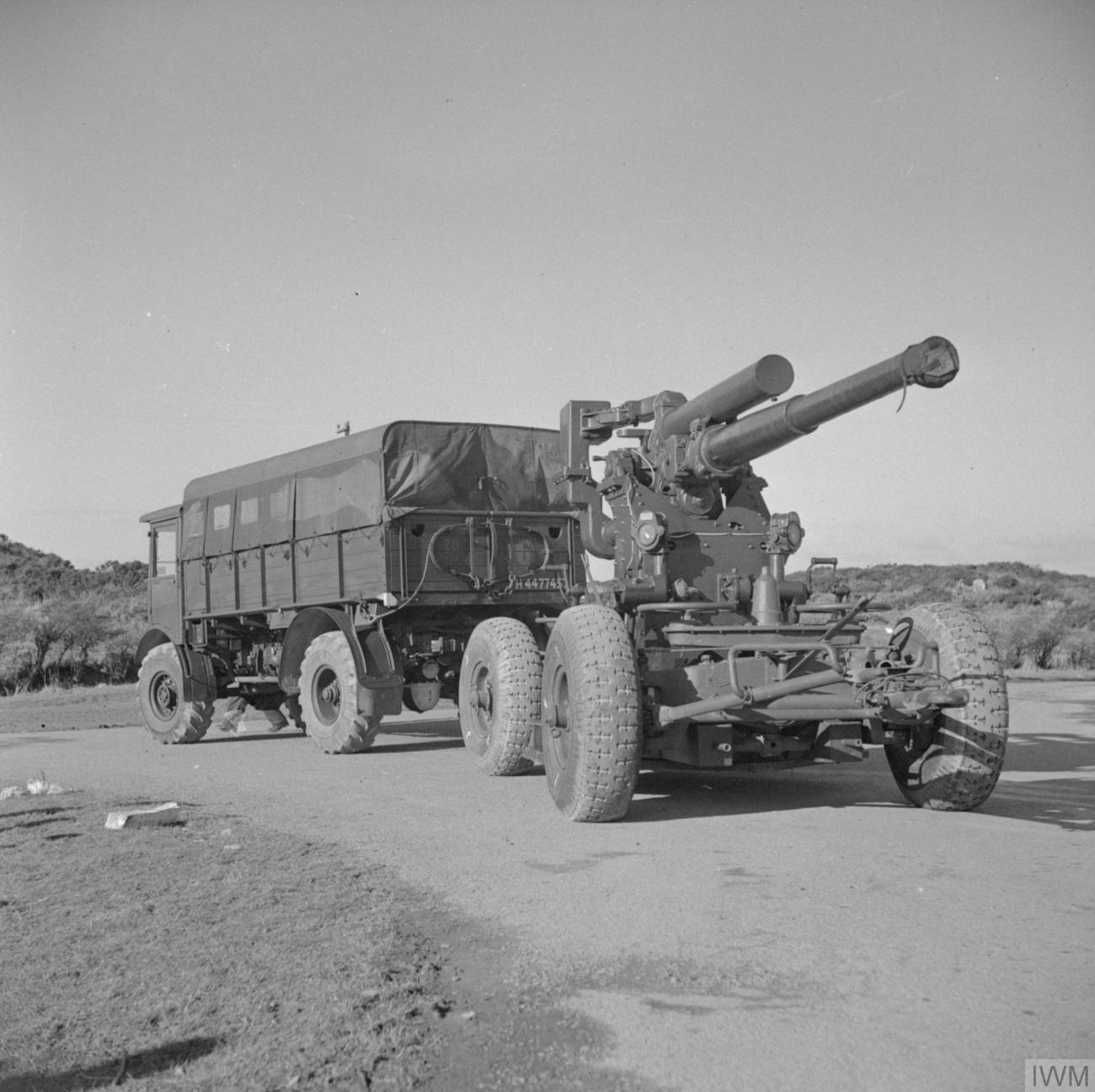
AEC Matador artillery tractor towing a 3.7-inch HAA gun on a training exercise in the UK.

In the autumn of 1942 the regiment, equipped with 24 3.7-inch guns, was joined by its own HAA Signal Section of the Royal Corps of Signals (RCS) and by November it was fully organised for mobile operations with the following composition:

- 217 HAA Bty
- 218 HAA Bty
- 393 HAA Bty
- 72 HAA Rgt Signal Section, RCS
- 72 HAA Workshop, Royal Electrical and Mechanical Engineers
- 72 HAA Rgt Platoon, Royal Army Service Corps

=== North Africa ===
72nd (Hampshire) HAA Rgt sailed from the River Clyde in late October as part of 52 AA Bde in First Army for Operation Torch, the Allied landings in North Africa. AA units trained in amphibious operations were to land in the assault phase of the operation, followed by the mobile units of 52 AA Bde. After covering the landing beaches, ports and airfields, the brigade would then follow First Army's advance eastwards, leaving other AA formations to cover the bases in the rear. The invasion force began landing on 8 November 1942, with V Corps of First Army landing round Algiers. After the initial landings were complete, V Corps sent a series of infantry and commando groups eastwards on 9 November and 52 AA Bde HQ landed.

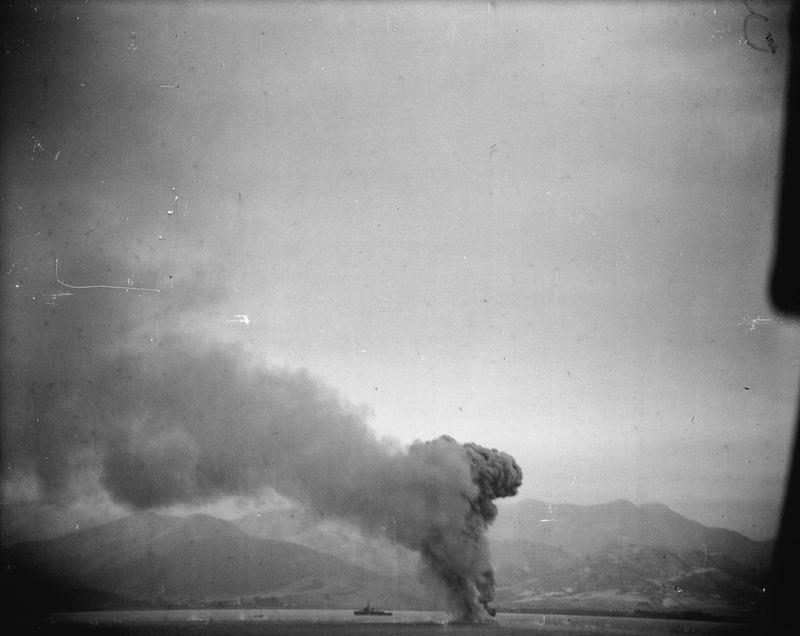
Ammunition exploding as SS Cathay is sunk off Bougie, 12 November 1942.

Leaving some batteries to unload and set up an 'Inner Artillery Zone' (IAZ) around Algiers, 52 AA Bde began a long march eastwards. The need to get AA units forward quickly to protect the vital airfields had been foreseen, and one of 72nd HAA Rgt's batteries went on by sea direct to Bougie. The Axis air forces reacted quickly and 72nd HAA Rgt suffered equipment losses when the liner SS Cathay was sunk off Bougie. However, by 12 November V Corps' leading troops had covered 300 miles (480 km) and Bône had been secured by a parachute drop. Bône now came under intense air attack. At first it was only protected by LAA guns, but a battery of 72nd HAA Rgt came up, even though it had lost its gun-laying (GL) radar set in a torpedoed ship. On 21 November the AA gunners at Bône fought raids by Junkers Ju 88 bombers that set buildings and stores ablaze, and destroyed the AA gunners' small stock of vehicles.

As the Tunisian Campaign developed, forward movement was slowed by terrain and shortages: most units in 'Torch' had only 50 per cent of their vehicle establishment, and AA units frequently had to lend theirs to other units for urgent transport tasks. By the end of November, the AA deployment had reached planned levels, but V Corps' advance had been held by the rapid arrival of German forces. As the Allies built up strength for a renewed advance, the emphasis for the AA units turned to defence for the ports and airfields against heavy attacks by the Luftwaffe. By January the arrival of reinforcements allowed 52 AA Bde to concentrate on providing front line support for V Corps. The brigade was prepared to follow up any breakthrough towards Tunis.

During January 1943, batteries of 72nd HAA Rgt were variously deployed:

- Constantine airfield
- Philippeville port and airfield: (with a Troop of 71st (Forth) HAA Rgt)
- Youks-les-Bains Airfield
- Thelepte Airfield

By mid-March 1943, the regiment's deployments included:

- Tebessa Airfield: 1 1/2 Btys (with a Bty of 63rd LAA Rgt)
- Constantine: 1 Trp

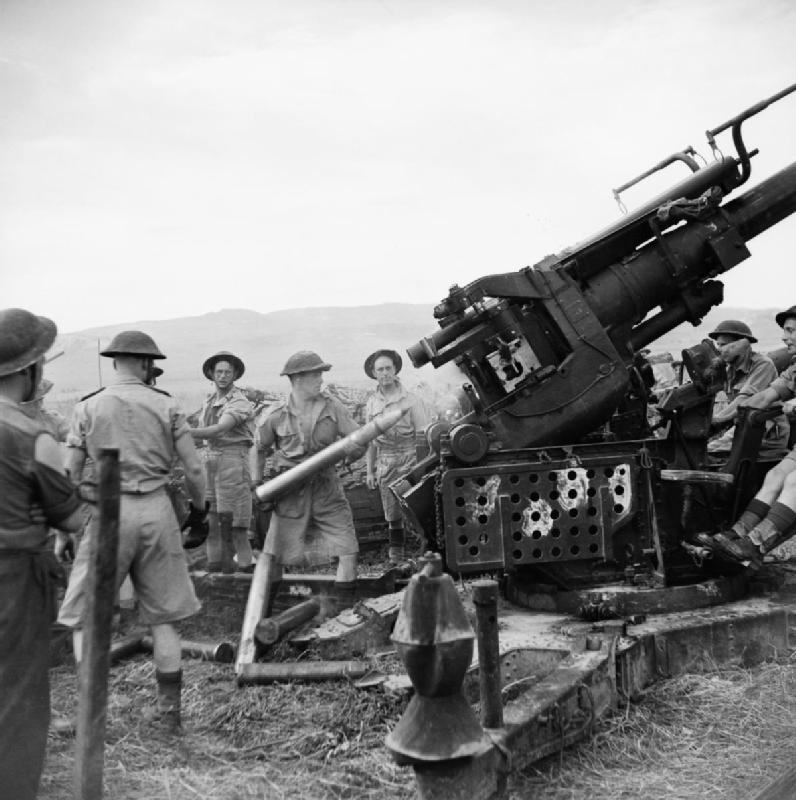
3.7-inch gun operating in the field gun role in Tunisia.

As the fighting continued into April, the HAA guns in forward positions were increasingly used to fire on ground targets to supplement the medium artillery. When IX Corps came into the line for the 'dogfight' to penetrate the mountain passes near Fondouk, 72nd HAA Rgt was assigned to it and was heavily engaged in both the AA and ground roles. In one week, 20–27 April, the regiment shot down seven enemy aircraft for the expenditure of 1022 rounds, but fired many more low-angle rounds at ground targets, which damaged the elevating and balancing gear of the 3.7-inch guns.

By the beginning of May, First Army was ready for its final assault on Tunis, Operation Vulcan. The AA plan for 'Vulcan' was straightforward: 52 AA Bde held a number of AA units including 72nd HAA Rgt on their wheels and ready to move into Tunis immediately behind the leading battle groups. Delayed by a German counter-attack, the assault went in on 6 May and covered 15 miles (24 km) on the first day. The leading British armoured units entered Tunis on the afternoon of 7 May. After a series of conflicting reports from the city, 52 AA Bde was called forward and 72nd HAA Rgt immediately deployed in the city. In fact, Tunis was not yet clear of the enemy and some AA advance parties had to flush out resistance. The German forces surrendered on 12 May.

The role of the AA units turned to protecting the North African embarkation ports for the forthcoming Allied invasion of Sicily (Operation Husky).

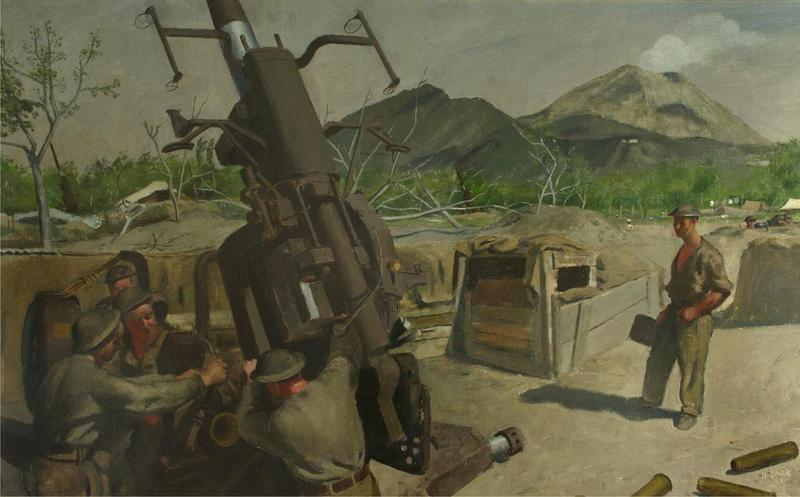
3.7-inch HAA gun of 393 Bty, 72nd HAA Rgt, in Italy, with Mt Vesuvius in the background (Painting by Henry Carr).

=== Italy ===
72nd (Hampshire) HAA Regiment was not employed in 'Husky', nor in the assault phase of the subsequent Allied invasion of the Italian mainland, but it formed part of 22 AA Bde, which landed and took over the air defence of Naples in late October 1943. Naples was a difficult city to defend against air attack, with a large anchorage, port facilities and airfields such as Bagnoli, all overlooked by mountains, but 22 AA Bde established a fully integrated layout of HAA and LAA guns with early warning and gun-laying radar, and involving United States Army and Italian Co-belligerent Army units. This was necessitated by the scale of the Luftwaffe's attempts to disrupt the flow of supplies through the port. On 5 November alone, more than 100 aircraft raided the port and four were brought down by AA fire. On 9 November two out of 30 were shot down, and on 26 November, in conjunction with fighter aircraft, nine hostiles were destroyed. The port was damaged but continued working. The AA strength around Naples reached its peak in November 1943.

The Luftwaffe began a new series of raids against Naples in March 1944, but after May the AA strength there could be reduced, and the AA gunners settled to a regular programme of routine manning and training, interspersed with garrison duties such as transporting stores from the docks. The last spasmodic raids occurred in July and August.

72nd HAA Rgt remained in 22 AA Bde in the Naples area until October 1944, but by then the threat from the Luftwaffe was diminishing and there was an urgent need for manpower in other areas. A number of AA units including 72nd HAA Rgt began to be disbanded in the latter part of 1944, and the regiment passed into suspended animation 30 January 1945.

== Postwar ==
In 1947, with the revival of the Territorial Army, the Hampshire Yeomanry was reformed as 295th (Hampshire Carabineers) Heavy Anti-Aircraft Regiment, RA (TA) with HQ at Winchester. It formed part of 100 Army Group Royal Artillery (TA) until this formation was disbanded on 9 September 1948.

AA Command was disbanded on 10 March 1955, and the regiment passed into suspended animation at the same time.

It was resuscitated on 1 September 1963 and amalgamated with 457 (Wessex) Heavy Air Defence Regiment RA (TA). The two units were renamed 457 (Wessex) Heavy Air Defence Regiment, RA (Hampshire Carabiniers Yeomanry). This gave the Regiment the longest title in the army. It took on a new role converting from traditional anti-aircraft guns to using the Thunderbird Anti-Aircraft Missile. The Regiment had the distinction of firing the last three missiles in the UK before Thunderbird was decommissioned. On 31 March 1967 the Regiment was disbanded on the demise of the Territorial Army and its replacement by the Territorial and Army Volunteer Reserve (TAVR), but 457 Regiment provided C Company in the TAVR's Hampshire and Isle of Wight Territorials.

The regiment was reformed in 1992 when the Hampshire Yeomanry returned as the 227 (Hampshire Yeomanry) Amphibious Engineer Squadron, Royal Engineers. Again this was a very short-lived incarnation as, after the Strategic Defence Review in 1999, the unit was re-roled as artillery with the formation of 457 (Hampshire Yeomanry) Battery in 106 (Yeomanry) Regiment Royal Artillery. The battery was based at Millbrook, Southampton and equipped with high-velocity missiles (HVM).

Under Army 2020 457 (Hampshire Carabiniers Yeomanry) Battery was re-equipped at Southampton with high-velocity missiles mounted on Stormer vehicles and 295 (Hampshire Yeomanry) Battery was formed at Portsmouth and equipped in the same way. Both batteries form part of 106 (Yeomanry) Regiment.

== Uniforms and insignia ==
The North Hampshire Yeomanry wore Hussar style dress after 1841. In 1861 the regiment adopted a simpler dress uniform based on an older Hussar undress uniform: this consisted of a plain blue jacket with five loops of braid. The jacket was reserved for dismounted review order and walking-out dress from 1885 and was not completely abolished in the Hampshire Carabiniers until 1902.

As 'Carabiniers' from 1887 the regiment adopted a Dragoon style of uniform, with a blue tunic faced in blue, though the facings were later changed to white, resembling the uniform of the Carabiniers (6th Dragoon Guards) of the Regular Army. The white metal Dragoon helmet carried a white horsehair plume, the blue pantaloons or overalls carried a white stripe, and the shoulder-belt was white leather.

While many yeomanry regiments had simplified their dress uniforms after 1902, the Hampshire Carabiniers retained the dark blue tunic and overalls (tight fitting cavalry trousers), with white facings, of the regular 6th Dragoon Guards as a model. The silver helmet with white plume described above continued to be worn in review order until 1914.

The guidon bore crossed carbines in saltire, with white roses in the first and fourth corners and red roses in the second and third corners. From 1920 until 1955 the Hampshire Yeomanry RA batteries wore Yeomanry cap badges and buttons, with RA (later Yeomanry) collar badges.

== Honorary Colonels ==
The following served as Honorary Colonel of the regiment:

- Charles Shaw-Lefevre, 1st Viscount Eversley (Hon Lt-Col), former CO of the regiment, appointed 16 June 1868
- Thomas Baring, 1st Earl of Northbrook, former major in the regiment, appointed 26 January 1889
- Lt-Col Hon Sir Henry Crichton, KCB, TD, former CO, appointed 10 June 1906
- Maj-Gen J. E. B. Seely, 1st Baron Mottistone, CB, CMG, DSO, TD, former CO, appointed 2 December 1922

== Battle honours ==
The Hampshire Yeomanry has been awarded the following battle honours:

Second Boer War

South Africa 1900–01

First World War

Messines 1917, Somme 1918, St. Quentin, Bapaume 1918, Arras 1918, Ypres 1918, Courtrai, France and Flanders 1916–17 '18, Italy 1917–18

Second World War

Battle honours are not awarded to the Royal Artillery. (Note: The Royal Artillery was present in nearly all battles and would have earned most of the honours awarded to cavalry and infantry regiments. In 1833, William IV awarded the motto Ubique (meaning "everywhere") in place of all battle honours.)

== Memorials ==
The names of men from Winchester who served in 41st and 50th (Hampshire) Companies, Imperial Yeomanry, during the Second Boer War are listed on a plaque in the entrance to Winchester Guildhall.

Seventy-four members of the Hampshire Yeomanry are commemorated on the Hampshire and Isle of Wight war memorial that stands in Winchester Cathedral Close.

The regimental guidon presented in 1909 by King Edward VII was laid up in Winchester Cathedral on 6 November 1955 after the regiment passed into suspended animation.

== See also ==
- Imperial Yeomanry
- List of Yeomanry Regiments 1908
- Yeomanry
- Yeomanry order of precedence
- British yeomanry during the First World War
- Second line yeomanry regiments of the British Army
- List of British Army Yeomanry Regiments converted to Royal Artillery

== Bibliography ==
- L.S. Amery (ed.), The Times History of the War in South Africa 1899-1902, London: Sampson Low, Marston, 6 Vols 1900–09.
- Maj A.F. Becke,History of the Great War: Order of Battle of Divisions, Part 2a: The Territorial Force Mounted Divisions and the 1st-Line Territorial Force Divisions (42–56), London: HM Stationery Office, 1935/Uckfield: Naval & Military Press, 2007, ISBN 1-847347-39-8.
- Maj A.F. Becke,History of the Great War: Order of Battle of Divisions, Part 2b: The 2nd-Line Territorial Force Divisions (57th–69th), with the Home-Service Divisions (71st–73rd) and 74th and 75th Divisions, London: HM Stationery Office, 1937/Uckfield: Naval & Military Press, 2007, ISBN 1-847347-39-8.
- Maj A.F. Becke,History of the Great War: Order of Battle of Divisions, Part 3b: New Army Divisions (30–41) and 63rd (R.N.) Division, London: HM Stationery Office, 1939/Uckfield: Naval & Military Press, 2007, ISBN 1-847347-41-X.
- Burke's Peerage, Baronetage and Knightage, 100th Edn, London, 1953.
- Basil Collier, History of the Second World War, United Kingdom Military Series: The Defence of the United Kingdom, London: HM Stationery Office, 1957.
- Col John K. Dunlop, The Development of the British Army 1899–1914, London: Methuen, 1938.
- Gen Sir Martin Farndale, History of the Royal Regiment of Artillery: The Years of Defeat: Europe and North Africa, 1939–1941, Woolwich: Royal Artillery Institution, 1988/London: Brasseys, 1996, ISBN 1-85753-080-2.
- J.B.M. Frederick, Lineage Book of British Land Forces 1660–1978, Vol I, Wakefield, Microform Academic, 1984, ISBN 1-85117-007-3.
- J.B.M. Frederick, Lineage Book of British Land Forces 1660–1978, Vol II, Wakefield, Microform Academic, 1984, ISBN 1-85117-009-X.
- James, Brigadier E.A. (1978). British Regiments 1914–18. London: Samson Books Limited. ISBN 0-906304-03-2.
- Joslen, H. F. (2003) [1960]. Orders of Battle: Second World War, 1939–1945. Uckfield, East Sussex: Naval and Military Press. ISBN 978-1-84342-474-1.
- N.B. Leslie, Battle Honours of the British and Indian Armies 1695–1914, London: Leo Cooper, 1970, ISBN 0-85052-004-5.
- Norman E.H. Litchfield, The Territorial Artillery 1908–1988 (Their Lineage, Uniforms and Badges), Nottingham: Sherwood Press, 1992, ISBN 0-9508205-2-0.
- Mileham, Patrick (1994). The Yeomanry Regiments; 200 Years of Tradition. Edinburgh: Canongate Academic. ISBN 1-898410-36-4.
- Maj-Gen I.S.O. Playfair & Brig C.J.C. Molony, History of the Second World War, United Kingdom Military Series: The Mediterranean and Middle East, Vol IV: The Destruction of the Axis forces in Africa, London: HMSO, 1966/Uckfield, Naval & Military Press, 2004, ISBN 1-845740-68-8
- Rinaldi, Richard A (2008). Order of Battle of the British Army 1914. Ravi Rikhye. ISBN 978-0-97760728-0.
- Col H.C.B. Rogers, The Mounted Troops of the British Army 1066–1945, London: Seeley Service, 1959.
- Brig N.W. Routledge, History of the Royal Regiment of Artillery: Anti-Aircraft Artillery 1914–55, London: Royal Artillery Institution/Brassey's, 1994, ISBN 1-85753-099-3.
- Lt-Col Ernest Ryan 'Arms, Uniforms and Equipment of the Yeomanry Cavalry', Journal of the Society for Army Historical Research, September 1957, Vol 35, pp. 124–33.
- Edward M. Spiers, The Army and Society 1815–1914, London: Longmans, 1980, ISBN 0-582-48565-7.
- Titles and Designations of Formations and Units of the Territorial Army, London: War Office, 7 November 1927 (RA sections also summarised in Litchfield, Appendix IV).

=== External links ===
- Mark Conrad, The British Army, 1914 (archive site)
- British Army units from 1945 on
- The Long, Long Trail
- Imperial War Museum, War Memorials Register
- Land Forces of Britain, the Empire and Commonwealth – Regiments.org (archive site)
- Orders of Battle at Patriot Files Archived 26 March 2023 at the Wayback Machine
- The Regimental Warpath 1914–1918 (archive site)
- Roll of Honour* Graham Watson, The Territorial Army 1947
