= Melville Portal =

British politician (1819–1904)

Melville Portal JP, DL (31 July 1819 – 24 January 1904) was a British Conservative Party politician from Hampshire.

== Career ==
Portal was educated at Christ Church, Oxford, graduating B.A. in 1842, and M.A. in 1844. In 1841 he was treasurer and in 1842 President of the Oxford Union.

He was elected as a member of parliament (MP) for North Hampshire at a by-election in April 1849, following the resignation of the Conservative MP Sir William Heathcote. He was re-elected unopposed in 1852 at a sparsely attended hustings in Winchester, and retired from the House of Commons at the 1857 general election.

Portal was appointed in December 1852 as a deputy lieutenant of Hampshire, and by 1863 he was also a justice of the peace (JP) for the county. He was nominated as High Sheriff of Hampshire in 1861 and in 1862, and was appointed to the office in 1863, when his address was given as Laverstoke House, Mitcheldever Station.

== Melville Portal's lands recorded in the 1870 and 1880s ==
According to John Bateman's The Great Landowners of Great Britain and Ireland, 1883, Melville Portal of Laverstoke, Overton, Hampshire, educated at Harrow and Christ Church, Oxford, and a member of the Carlton Club, had 10,966 acres in Hampshire worth 10,922 per annum.

== Personal life ==
The son of John Portal of Freefolk Priors, Hampshire and his wife Elizabeth Drummond, in 1855 Portal married Lady Charlotte Elliot (died 1899), the first child of the 2nd Earl of Minto. The couple had at least four children, including Sir Gerald Herbert Portal (1858–1894), and Katherine Charlotte Portal (1866–1917). Sir Gerald was a rapidly promoted young diplomat, whose career in Africa led to him contracting malaria, and he died of typhoid in London on 25 January 1894. An older son Captain Melville Raymond Portal died in Africa in 1893 serving under his brother in Kampala- these two sons are to be found in a memorial sculpture in the Cathedral in Winchester. The third son was Alaraic William John Portal, an officer in the Royal Navy.

Parliament of the United Kingdom
Preceded by Sir William Heathcote, Bt; Charles Shaw-Lefevre	Member of Parliament for North Hampshire; 1849 – 1857; With: Charles Shaw-Lefevre	Succeeded by Bramston Beach; George Sclater-Booth
