= 1874 North Hampshire by-election =

UK Parliamentary by-election

The 1874 North Hampshire by-election was fought on 14 March 1874. The by-election was fought due to the incumbent Conservative MP, George Sclater-Booth, becoming President of the Local Government Board. It was retained by the incumbent.
