= Hyde Close drill hall =

Military building in Winchester, Hampshire, England

- Winchester
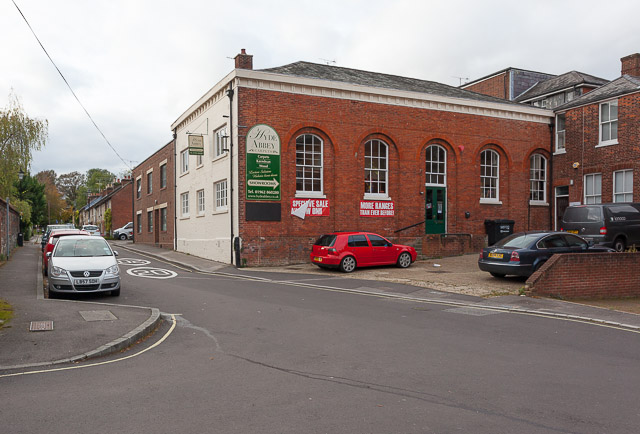
- Hyde Close drill hall

Site information
- Type: Drill hall

Location
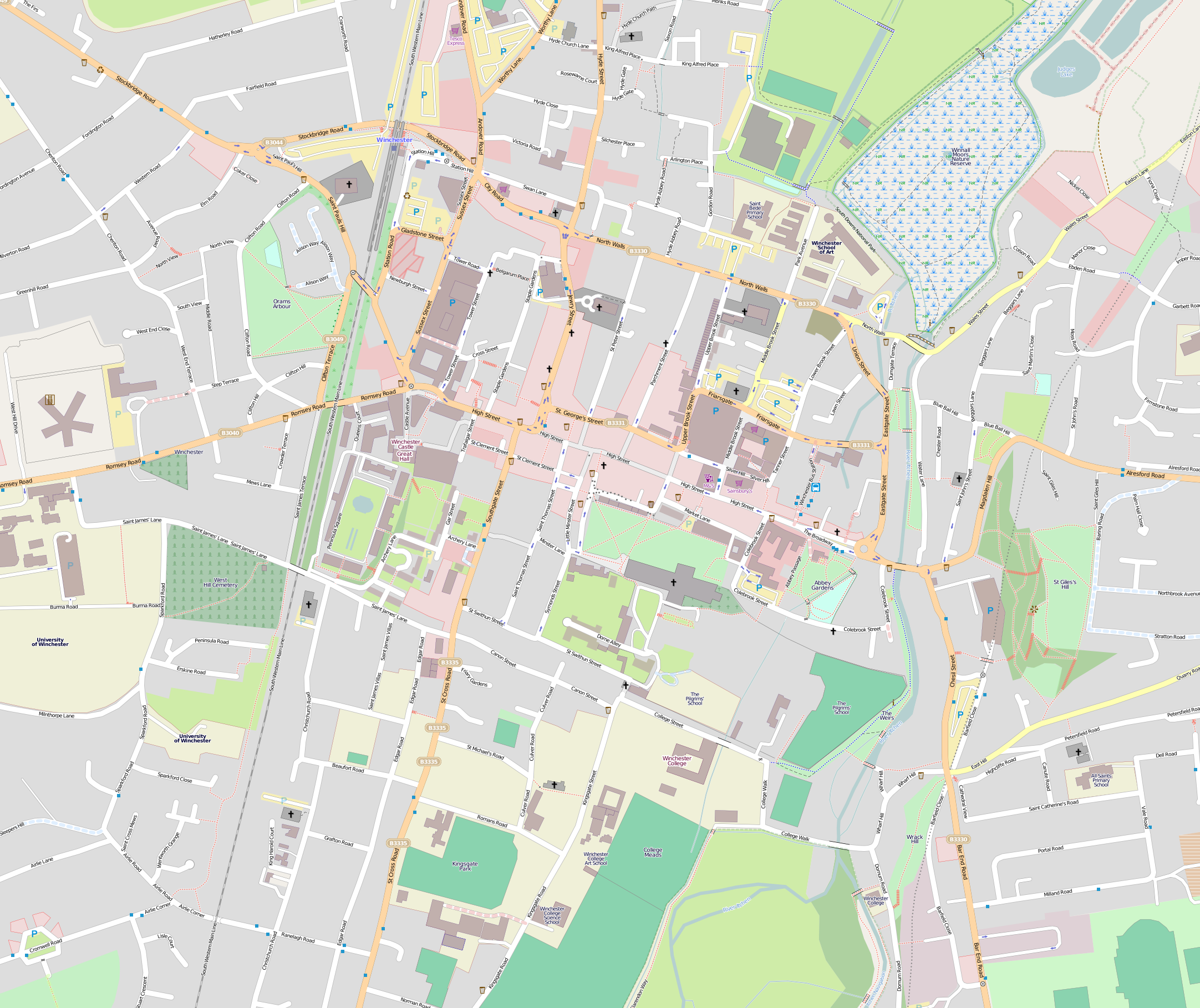
- Location within Winchester
- Coordinates: 51°04′05″N 1°18′58″W

Site history
- Built: 1795
- Built for: War Office
- In use: 1795 – 1920

Garrison information
- Occupants

Listed Building – Grade II
- Official name: Premises Occupied by Richardson and Starling Ltd
- Designated: 14 January 1974
- Reference no.: 1172828

The Hyde Close drill hall is a former military installation in Winchester. It is a Grade II listed building.

== History ==
The building was designed by Sir John Soane and completed in 1795. After a period as a school operating under the leadership of the Reverend Charles Richards, and then as a local headquarters for the Salvation Army, it became the headquarters of the Hampshire Yeomanry Cavalry (Carabiniers) in the late 19th century. The regiment was mobilised at the drill hall in August 1914 before being deployed to the Western Front. After the regiment converted to an artillery unit, the hall was decommissioned and converted for retail use. It is currently used as a carpet showroom.
