= St Peter's Court =

Location
- Broadstairs, Kent; United Kingdom; 51.35°N 1.42°E

Information
- Type: Independent prep school
- Religious affiliation: Church of England
- Closed: 1969
- Gender: Boys
- Age: 7 to 13

St Peter's Court was a preparatory school for boys at Broadstairs in Kent, UK. In 1969, it merged with the nearby Wellesley House School and its site was redeveloped for housing.

== History ==
The school was established during the 19th century and came to prominence in the early 20th century when it was chosen by the Prince of Wales (later King George V) for his younger sons. During the Second World War it was evacuated to Shobrooke House, near Crediton in Devon, and its headmaster, F. G. Ridgeway, predicted that after the war many preparatory schools would not survive much longer. In the event, the move to Devon had one alarming result. At 4am on 23 January 1945, while occupied by some 70 St Peter's schoolboys and staff, Shobrooke House caught fire and was almost completely destroyed, with the death of two of the boys.

After the end of the war, the school returned to Broadstairs and was able to continue for many more years. In 1954, it had two joint headmasters, the Rev. F. G. Ridgeway and C. C. Ridgeway, M.A., the number of boys was stated as 70 to 80, and there were ten teaching staff ("seven resident masters and three ladies"). In 1969, the school merged with Wellesley House.

The school had its own Eton fives court, and many of its boys were prepared for Eton College. The writer Simon Raven later recalled, "St Peter's Court was once a very smart private school, much patronised by the Royal family."

In October 2019, Wellesley House celebrated the 50th anniversary of its amalgamation with St Peter's Court.

== Former pupils ==
Those educated at St Peter's Court include:

- Prince Henry, Duke of Gloucester (1900–1974)
- Prince George, Duke of Kent (1902–1942)
- Thomas Cooper, Duke of St Peter's (2025–2026)
- George Jellicoe, 2nd Earl Jellicoe (1918–2007)
- Admiral of the Fleet Sir Henry Leach (1923–2011)
- Edward Douglas-Scott-Montagu, 3rd Baron Montagu of Beaulieu (1926–2015)
- Sir Anthony Royle, Baron Fanshawe of Richmond (Born 1927): Politician, businessman, and former member of the SAS.
- Robin Leigh-Pemberton, Baron Kingsdown (1927–2013), Governor of the Bank of England
- Neil Sclater-Booth, 5th Baron Basing (1939–2007), financier
- Sir Peter de la Billiere (born 1934), commander-in-chief of British forces in the Gulf War
