= Prince Henry, Duke of Gloucester =

British prince (1900–1974)

Prince Henry
- Duke of Gloucester
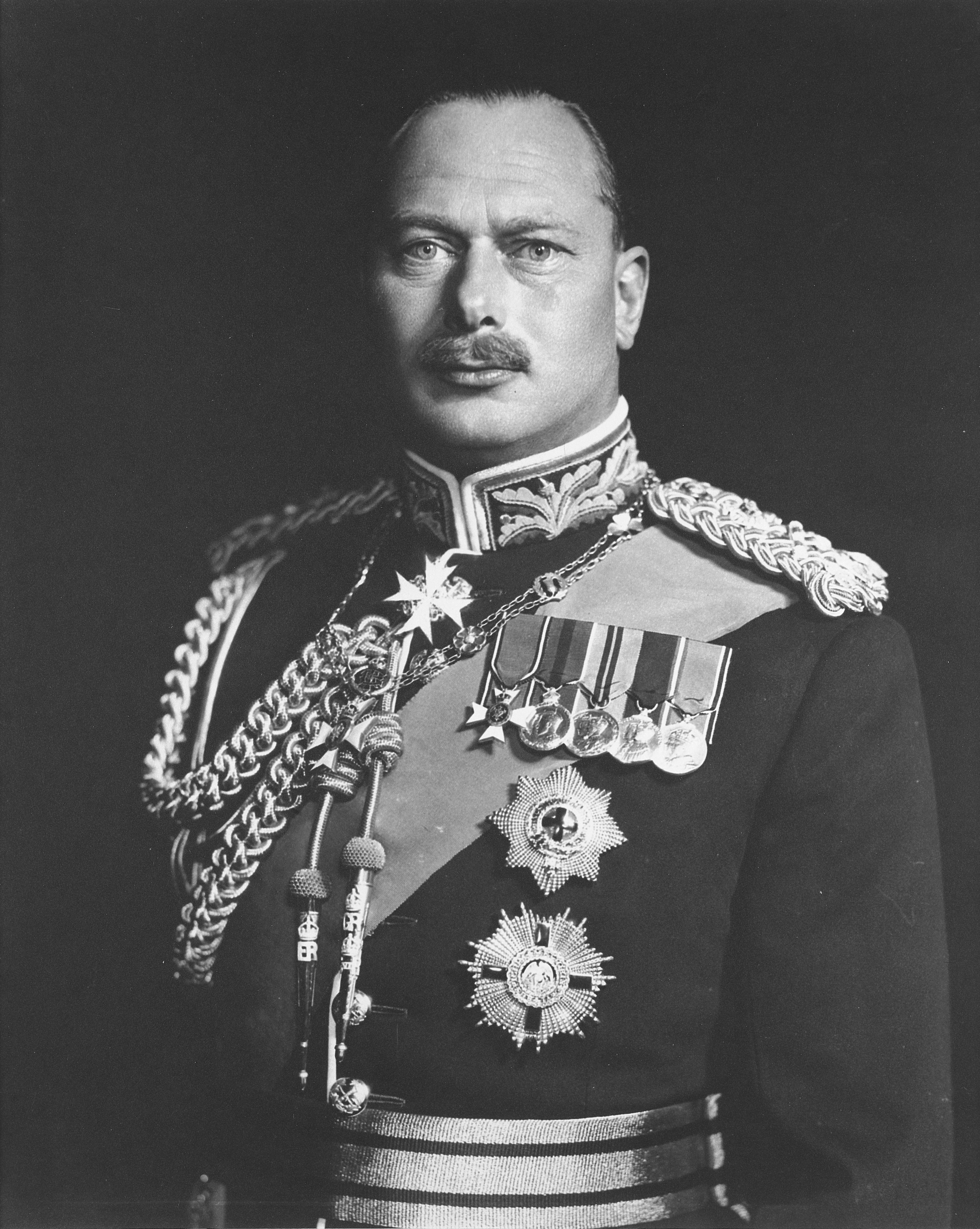
- Henry, c. 1945

11th Governor-General of Australia
- In office 30 January 1945 – 11 March 1947
- Monarch: George VI
- Prime Minister: John Curtin; Frank Forde; Ben Chifley
- Preceded by: The Lord Gowrie
- Succeeded by: Sir William McKell
- Born: Prince Henry of York; 31 March 1900; York Cottage, Sandringham, England
- Died: 10 June 1974 (aged 74); Barnwell Manor, Northamptonshire, England
- Burial: 14 June 1974; Royal Burial Ground, Frogmore
- Spouse: Lady Alice Montagu Douglas Scott (m. 1935)
- Issue: Prince William of Gloucester; Prince Richard, Duke of Gloucester
Names
- Henry William Frederick Albert
- House: Windsor (after 1917); Saxe-Coburg and Gotha (before 1917)
- Father: George V
- Mother: Mary of Teck
- Education: Eton College; Royal Military College, Sandhurst
- Military career
- Allegiance: United Kingdom
- Branch: British Army
- Years of active service: 1919–1945
- Rank: Field Marshal
- Units: King's Royal Rifle Corps; 10th Royal Hussars; British Expeditionary Force
- Conflicts: Second World War; Battle of France (WIA)

Prince Henry, Duke of Gloucester (Henry William Frederick Albert; 31 March 1900 – 10 June 1974), was a member of the British royal family. He was the third son of King George V and Queen Mary, and was a younger brother of kings Edward VIII and George VI. He served as the 11th governor-general of Australia from 1945 to 1947, the only prince to hold the post.

Henry was the first son of a British monarch to be educated at school, where he excelled at sports, and went on to attend Eton College, after which he was commissioned in the 10th Royal Hussars, a regiment he hoped to command. However, his military career was frequently interrupted by royal duties, and he was nicknamed "the unknown soldier" because of his low profile. While big-game shooting in Kenya, he met the future pilot Beryl Markham, with whom he became romantically involved. The court put pressure on him to end the relationship, but he had to pay regular hush-money to avert a public scandal. In 1935, also under parental pressure, he married Lady Alice Montagu Douglas Scott, with whom he had two sons, princes William and Richard.

From 1939 to 1940, Henry served in France as a liaison officer to Lord Gort. He performed military and diplomatic duties during the rest of the war, then in 1945 was appointed as Australia's governor-general at the request of Prime Minister John Curtin. The post had originally been offered to his younger brother the Duke of Kent, who died in an air crash. Henry attended the coronation of his niece Queen Elizabeth II in 1953 and carried out several overseas tours, often accompanied by his wife. From 1965, he became incapacitated by a number of strokes. Upon his death, he was succeeded as the Duke of Gloucester by his only living son, Richard.

Henry was the last surviving son of King George V and Queen Mary. His widow, who died at the age of 102, became the longest-lived member of the British royal family.

== Early life ==
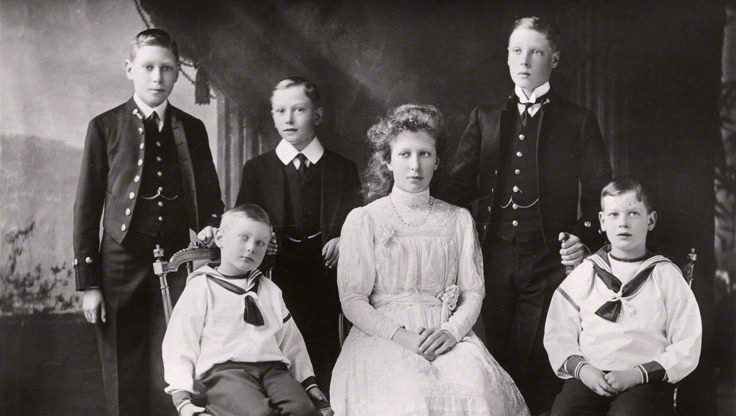
The royal children in 1912: (Back row l-r) Albert, Henry and Edward. (Front row l-r) John, Mary and George

Henry was born at 7:30 am on 31 March 1900 at York Cottage on the Sandringham Estate, during the reign of his great-grandmother Queen Victoria. His father was the Duke of York (later King George V), the only surviving son of the Prince and Princess of Wales (later King Edward VII and Queen Alexandra). His mother was the Duchess of York (later Queen Mary), the only daughter of the Duke and Duchess of Teck. At the time of his birth, he was fifth in the line of succession to the throne, behind his grandfather, father, and two elder brothers.

He was baptised in the private chapel at Windsor Castle on 17 May by Randall Thomas Davidson, Bishop of Winchester. Within the family he was informally known as Harry.

== Childhood and education ==
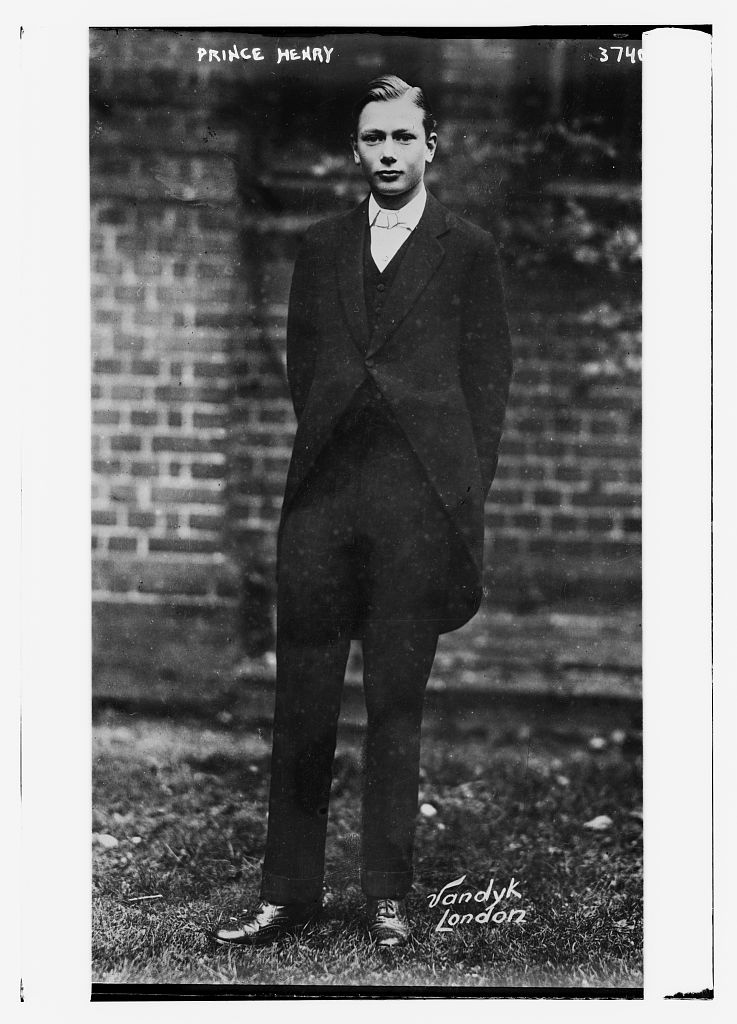
Henry at Eton College in 1916

As a child, Henry suffered from poor health, much like his elder brother Albert. He had knock knees and was required to wear leg splints, which caused considerable discomfort. He was an extremely nervous boy and was prone to sudden fits of crying or giggling. Like Albert, he had a combination of speech disorders. Both brothers had rhotacism, which prevented them from pronouncing the sound r; while Albert's pronunciation was reminiscent of the "French r", Henry was unable to produce the sound at all, replacing it with [w]. He also had a nasal lisp and an unusually high-pitched tone, which together gave him a distinctive voice.

By 1909, Henry's health had become a matter of concern to his parents. He was small for his age and susceptible to severe colds. George wrote to Henry's tutor, Henry Peter Hansell, that he should be treated differently from his more robust elder brothers, noting, "You must remember that he is rather fragile and must be treated differently to his two elder brothers who are more robust".

On 6 May 1910, George succeeded to the throne as George V, and Henry became third in line to the throne. Hansell persuaded the King that attending school would benefit Henry's character by allowing him to mix with boys of his own age. Although the King had previously rejected the idea for his elder sons, he agreed on the grounds that it would help Henry "behave like a boy and not like a little child". Henry thus became the first son of a British monarch to attend school. After three days at St Peter's Court in Broadstairs as a day boy, Hansell observed that he enjoyed the experience and asked the King to allow him to board, which he approved.

Henry spent three years at St Peter’s Court. He was not academically gifted, although he showed an aptitude for mathematics. His chief interest was sport, particularly cricket and football. His mother once wrote to him in exasperation, "All you write about is your everlasting football of which I am heartily sick", replying to a detailed letter he had sent about a match.

In September 1913, Henry entered Eton College. During the First World War, Crown Prince Leopold of Belgium, later Leopold III, was a member of his house, Mr Lubbock's. Henry's academic performance did not improve, but his nerves and general disposition did. He made friends through his enthusiasm for sport, and his masters regarded him favourably, describing him as "thoroughly willing, cheerful, modest & obedient". These qualities were valued highly by his father, who had little interest in what he termed "intellectuals".

By the time he began his studies at Trinity College, Cambridge in 1919 with Albert, Henry had outgrown all his brothers in height and build and enjoyed good health. Their time at Cambridge lasted only a year and was uneventful, as they were not permitted to live in college with the other undergraduates owing to the King's concern about their mixing with unsuitable company.

== Military career ==
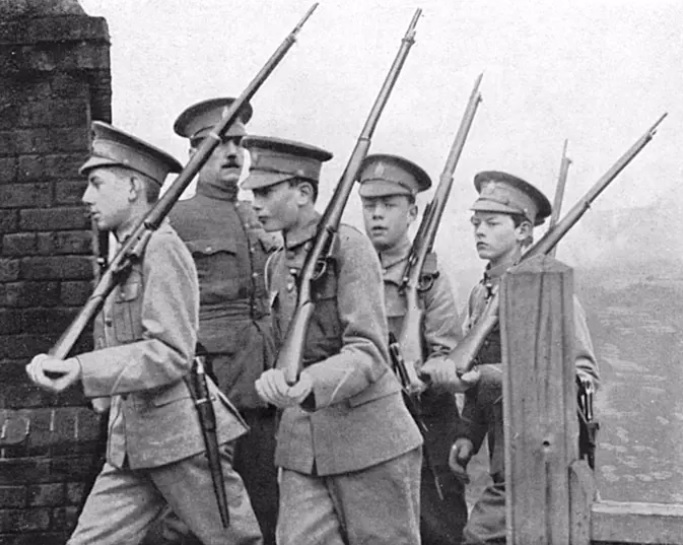
Henry undergoing military cadet training in 1915

Unlike his brothers, Henry joined the Army rather than the Royal Navy. He attended the Royal Military College, Sandhurst, in 1919, and was commissioned as a second lieutenant in the King's Royal Rifle Corps on 16 July. On 16 July 1921, he was promoted to lieutenant in the 10th Royal Hussars, with whom he continued to serve. Although he wished to undertake more active military duties, his position as a senior member of the royal family effectively precluded such roles. He retained a strong interest in sport, and The Cricketer reported in August 1921 that the touring Philadelphians had been presented to Henry at The Oval.

Henry was promoted to captain on 11 May 1927, and was appointed a personal aide-de-camp to his father on 2 August 1929. On 3 March 1931, he was appointed a staff captain and was seconded for service with the 2nd Cavalry Brigade. He was brevetted to major on 2 August 1934, and, during his father's Silver Jubilee the following May, was appointed Colonel-in-Chief of the Gloucestershire Regiment. On 6 July 1935, he was promoted to the substantive rank of major, his final rank as an actively serving officer. On 23 June 1936, he was appointed a personal aide-de-camp to his eldest brother, Edward VIII.

Following Edward's abdication and the accession of Albert as George VI, Henry was effectively retired from active duty and received a ceremonial promotion to major‑general on 1 January 1937, skipping three ranks. He was also granted a Royal Air Force commission as air vice-marshal on the same day. He continued to serve as a personal aide-de-camp to the new king, receiving this appointment on 1 February. On 12 March, he received the colonelcy of his former regiment, the 10th Royal Hussars, together with the colonelcies of the Royal Inniskilling Fusiliers and the Gordon Highlanders. On 28 May, he received an honorary appointment as a captain in the Royal Naval Volunteer Reserve, followed on 10 November by the honorary colonelcies of the Ceylon Planters' Rifle Corps and the Ceylon Light Infantry (now the Sri Lanka Light Infantry).

After the outbreak of World War II, he joined the British Expeditionary Force, and was appointed Chief Liaison Officer on 4 September 1939. In January 1940, he was appointed to the colonelcies of the Ulster Anti‑Aircraft Regiments of the Royal Artillery in the Territorial Army. He was slightly wounded in 1940 when his staff car was attacked from the air. In August 1940, he was appointed Chief Liaison Officer, GHQ Home Forces. He also became second-in-command of the 20th Light Armoured Brigade that year, and was promoted to lieutenant-general on 17 September 1941. On 27 October 1944, he was promoted to the rank of full general.

He was appointed a Field Marshal in 1955 and a Marshal of the Royal Air Force in 1958.

== Duke of Gloucester ==
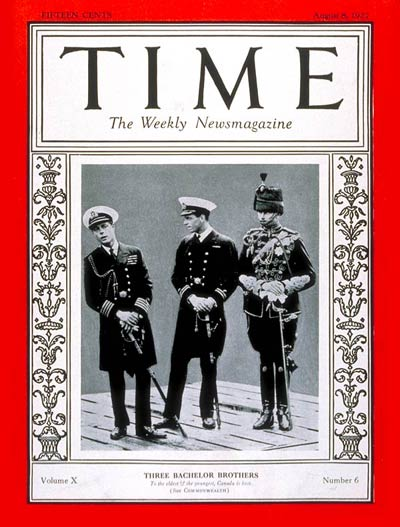
Henry (far right) with his brothers the Prince of Wales and Prince George on Time magazine's cover, 8 August 1927

On 31 March 1928, his father created him Duke of Gloucester, Earl of Ulster, and Baron Culloden, three titles that linked him with England, Northern Ireland, and Scotland. Later that year, Henry visited Canada.

Before his marriage, Henry's chief ambition was to command his regiment, the 10th Royal Hussars, or at least to spend as much time in the Army as possible. Although he was a capable officer, his position as the King's son prevented him from serving with his regiment overseas, and he was therefore regarded as something of an outsider by his fellow officers. To his increasing frustration, he was required to undertake the many royal duties assigned to him by his father.

In September 1928, Henry left England with his brother Edward to shoot big game in Africa. The brothers parted in Nairobi, where Henry remained for a time. He was entertained there by Mansfield Markham and his wife, Beryl Markham. Henry and Beryl began an affair, although sources differ on when it started; many state that it did not begin until her later visit to England. In November, the brothers were recalled to England owing to their father’s worsening health, and Beryl soon returned as well. At the Grosvenor Hotel, near Buckingham Palace, the affair continued, with Henry openly hosting parties in her suite and drinking heavily.

The affair, widely known in London society, shocked the Queen, much to the amusement of the Prince of Wales, who remarked that "for once, Queen Mary's blue-eyed boy was in trouble instead of himself". The King intervened, believing that keeping Henry occupied would help end the affair and curb his drinking. That year, he arranged a series of tours for his son to undertake.

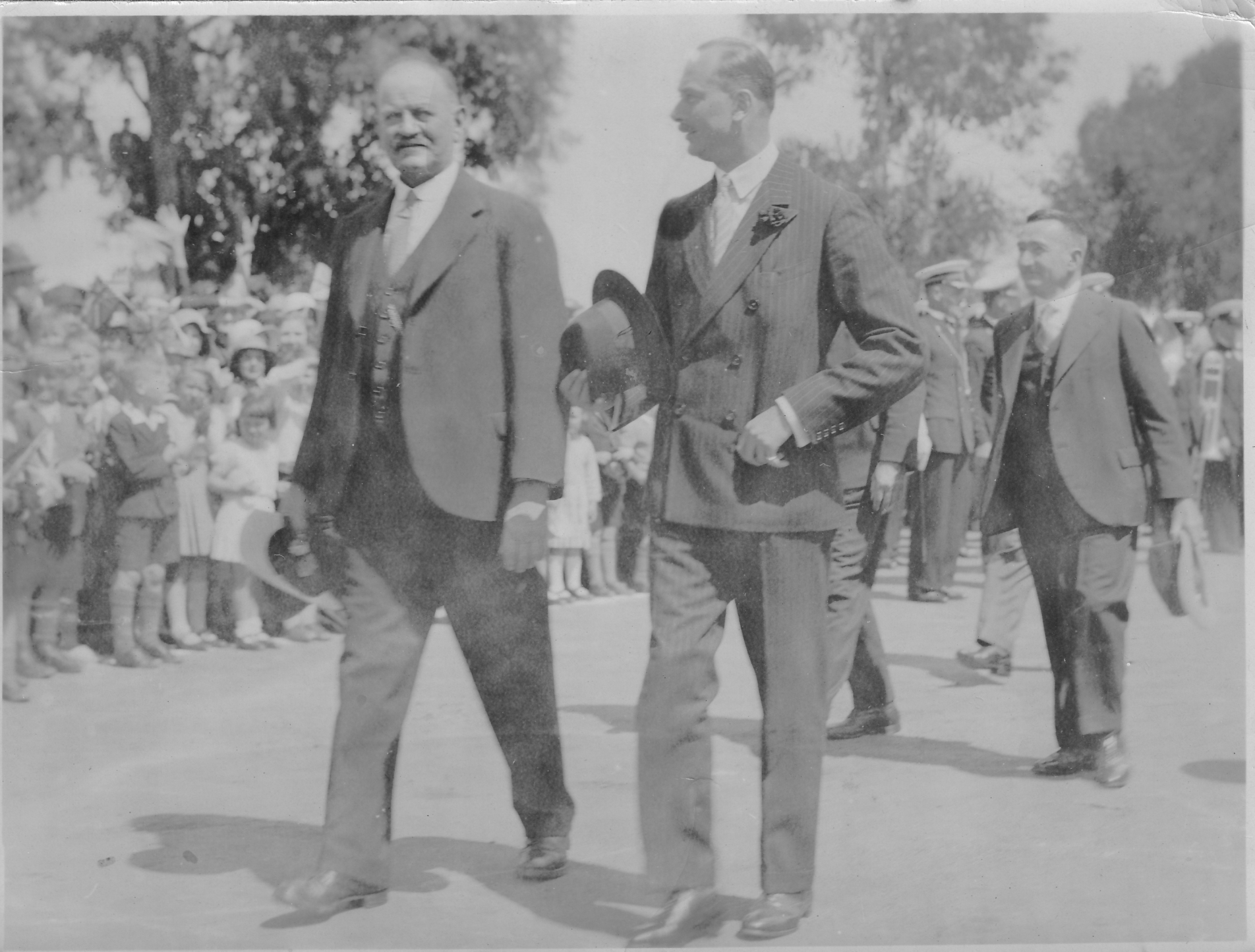
George Handley (Mayor) and Henry on his visit to Wangaratta 22 October 1934

In 1929, Henry travelled to Japan to confer the Garter on the Emperor, and the following year he attended the coronation of Haile Selassie of Ethiopia in Addis Ababa. In 1934, George V appointed him a Knight of St Patrick, Ireland's chivalric order. It was the second‑to‑last time the order was awarded; at the time of his death, Henry was its only surviving knight. Later in 1934, he visited Australia and New Zealand, where he was received with such enthusiasm that one journalist wrote it "(amounted) to something very near adoration".

== Marriage and family ==
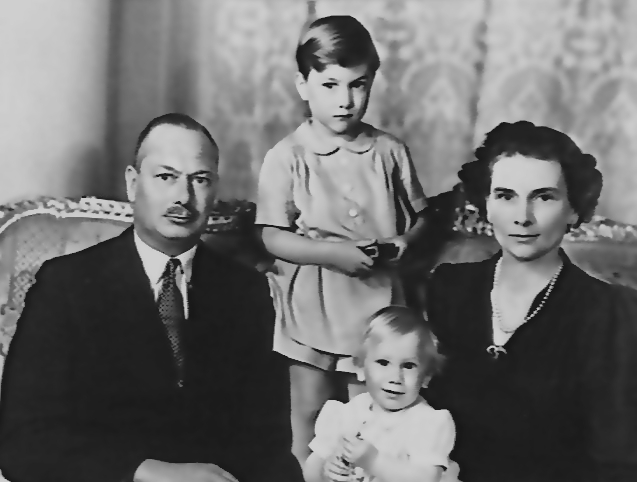
Henry and Alice with their two sons William (standing) and Richard in Canberra

When Henry returned from his visit to Japan in 1929, his affair with Beryl Markham came to an end. Her husband sought a divorce and threatened to disclose Henry's private letters to his wife unless he was prepared to "take care of Beryl". Henry and Beryl did not meet again, although she wrote to him when he visited Kenya in 1950 with his wife; he did not reply. Henry's solicitors paid her an annuity until her death in 1985.

After his tour of Australia and New Zealand, and under pressure from his parents, Henry decided it was time to settle and proposed to Lady Alice Montagu Douglas Scott, sister of one of his closest friends, Lord William Montagu Douglas Scott. Alice later wrote that the proposal was not romantic, as "it was not his way", and that he simply "mumbled it as we were on a walk one day". The wedding had originally been planned for Westminster Abbey, but was moved to the Private Chapel at Buckingham Palace following the death of Alice's father, the Duke of Buccleuch, on 19 October 1935. After two miscarriages, Alice gave birth to two sons:

- Prince William of Gloucester (18 December 1941 – 28 August 1972)
- Prince Richard, Duke of Gloucester (born 26 August 1944), who married Birgitte van Deurs on 8 July 1972; they later had three children.

=== Residences ===
During the early years of their marriage, Henry and Alice lived at the Royal Pavilion, Aldershot, near the barracks of Henry's regiment. Alice later recalled that "It was a very simple cabin," and "the only royal thing about it was my husband's presence." After his father's death, Henry bought Barnwell Manor in 1938. The price for the house and four tenanted farms was £37,500; in her memoirs, Alice described this as "the greater part of the money left to Prince Henry by the King." However, records of the financial arrangements following the abdication of Edward VIII state that Henry received a legacy of £750,000 from his father’s private fortune.

In 1937, Henry and Alice were given York House, St James's Palace, as their London residence. Prior to 1948, the couple also had use of Nottingham Cottage. They moved to Apartment 1, Kensington Palace, in November 1969.

Following Henry's appointment as Governor-General of Australia in 1945, the tenanted parts of the Barnwell estate were sold for £47,500. After his return to the United Kingdom, the surrounding farms were gradually repurchased during the 1940s, 1950s, and 1960s, restoring the estate to its original size of 5,000 acres.

== Abdication of Edward VIII ==
In December 1936, Henry's brother Edward VIII abdicated the throne to marry the divorcée Wallis Simpson. Their brother Albert ascended as King George VI. Although Henry was third in line to the throne, after his two nieces Princesses Elizabeth and Margaret, he became the first adult in line, meaning he would act as regent if anything happened to the King before Elizabeth reached the age of 18 on 21 April 1944. Because of this, Henry could not leave the United Kingdom at the same time as the King, and he and his younger brother, Prince George, Duke of Kent, had to increase their royal engagements considerably to support the new monarch.

Edward VIII, who became Duke of Windsor after abdicating, later recalled that Henry reacted least to the news of his abdication. The brothers had never been close and, apart from horses, had little in common. Edward admitted, however, that he regretted the implications the abdication would have for "The Unknown Soldier", a teasing nickname he used for Henry because of his low public profile.

The abrupt change in Henry's previously carefree life was made clear by the new King on the first evening of his reign. "If you two think that, now that I have taken this new job on, you can go on behaving just as you like, in the same old way, you are very much mistaken! You two have to pull yourselves together", he warned his younger brothers at dinner.

Although Henry supported his brother, and later his niece, tirelessly and dutifully, he had a fondness for whisky. On one occasion, Queen Mary wrote to Alice suggesting that, if they were planning to visit, Henry should bring his own supply, "as we have not got much left, and it is so expensive". Even Noble Frankland, who wrote Henry's biography after his death at Alice's request and under her supervision, noted that "He did not eschew a glass of whisky ... or the occasional blasphemous oath."

King George VI had great affection for Henry. Circumstances had brought them closer after the abdication, and the King trusted him with important matters, which Henry undertook dutifully. At times, though, the King's organised nature clashed with his brother's less systematic habits. After a day of shooting at Balmoral Castle, the King noticed a discrepancy in his shot-game record, where a pair of grouse appeared to be missing. A member of staff suggested telephoning Henry, who was staying at Birkhall. When Henry confirmed he had taken the birds, the King's gruff warning that he should never again take birds without telling him surprised the staff member.

== Second World War ==
After the outbreak of World War II, Henry, serving as Chief Liaison Officer to Lord Gort, spent almost the entire first year of the conflict in France. In addition to boosting morale among the troops, he provided first‑hand assessments of the situation, sending detailed and objective reports to government officials and to the King. Although naturally cautious, he often found himself in dangerous situations and appeared largely untroubled by them. Writing to Alice, he remarked in his typically direct manner: "Motoring about is not nice as many villages are being bombed". His two narrowest escapes occurred in May 1940.

Henry had known King Leopold III of Belgium since their school days and wished to offer personal support when rumours circulated that Belgium might surrender to Germany. On 14 May, he and his brother‑in‑law, Lord William Scott, drove from the Hotel Univers in Arras into Belgium to meet the King at a secret location. That night, the Hotel Univers was bombed, killing several people, including those in the rooms adjacent to Henry's. He wrote to his brother that Leopold was "very depressed". On the return journey, Henry and Scott were caught in heavy bombing in Tournai, where their car caught fire; they escaped into an alleyway, although Henry required medical attention for a profusely bleeding wound.

Although generally optimistic, Henry experienced bouts of depression during his service in 1940, particularly at the end of his occasional periods of leave. "My beloved Alice, I did hate leaving you yesterday so very much that I could hardly keep a straight face," he wrote after reporting back. The strain of life at the French front also wore on him: "I think I hate this country and war more than ever... it is such an awful waste of everything," he told Alice.

In June, after the fall of Dunkirk, Henry was ordered back to England by an embarrassed General Headquarters, which had been unable to guarantee the King's brother's safety. "Wherever I went or had been, I was bombed," he wrote to his mother, amused by the situation.

In early 1942, the King arranged a four‑month military and diplomatic mission for Henry to the Middle East, India, and East Africa. The mission began shortly after the birth of his first child and was considered dangerous, as German forces were advancing towards several of the territories he was due to visit. The King wrote to his sister‑in‑law that he would act as guardian to the newborn William should anything happen to Henry.

After Henry's younger brother, the Duke of Kent, was killed in a plane crash in Scotland in August 1942, it was decided that Henry would not be sent on any further missions that might place him at similar risk.

== Governor-General of Australia ==
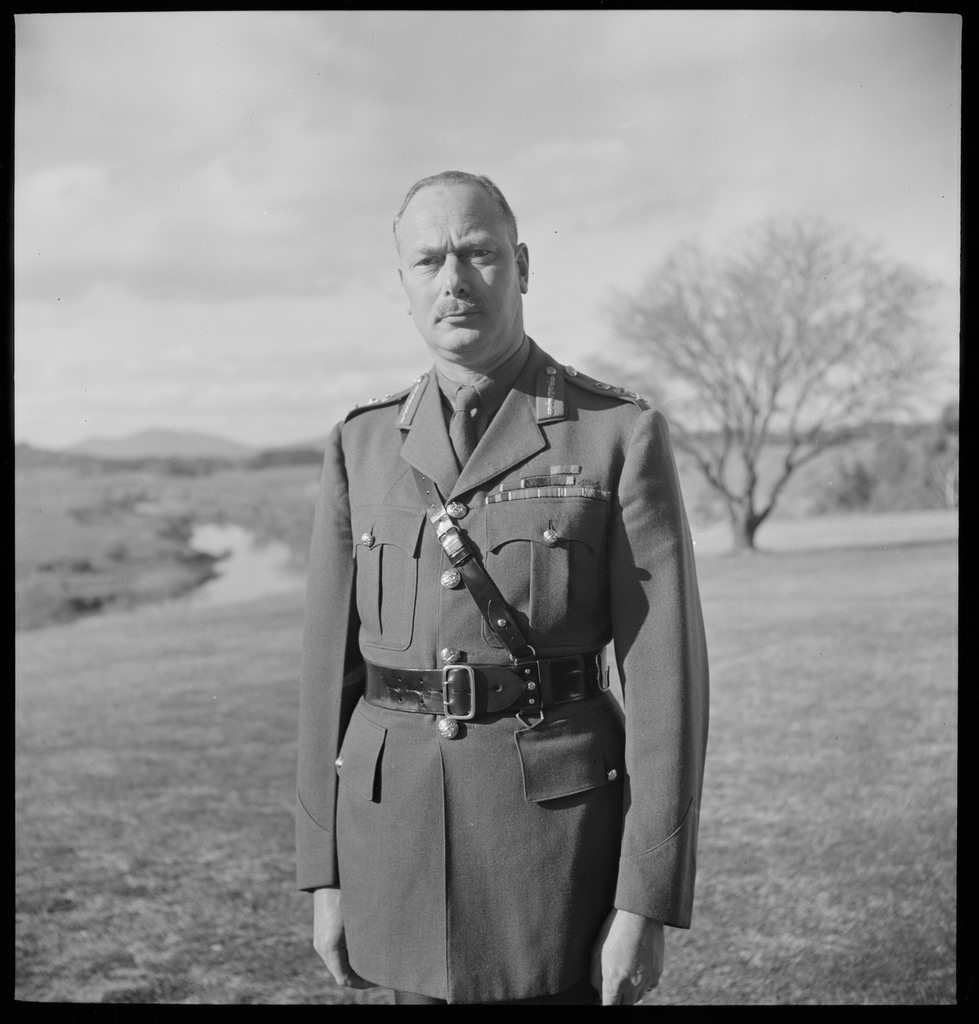
Henry as Governor-General of Australia in 1945

In late 1944, Henry was unexpectedly appointed Governor-General of Australia following the death in 1942 of his younger brother, the Duke of Kent, who had previously been offered the post. He had made a well‑received visit to Australia in 1934. Although naturally shy, which sometimes made him appear formal, Henry and Alice travelled extensively during their tenure, using his own aircraft for official journeys. When Prime Minister John Curtin died in 1945, Henry appointed Frank Forde as his successor.

Henry left Australia in March 1947 after two years in office. He was recalled to the United Kingdom to act as Counsellor of State on behalf of the King during the visit by George VI and Princesses Elizabeth and Margaret to South Africa.

== Later life ==
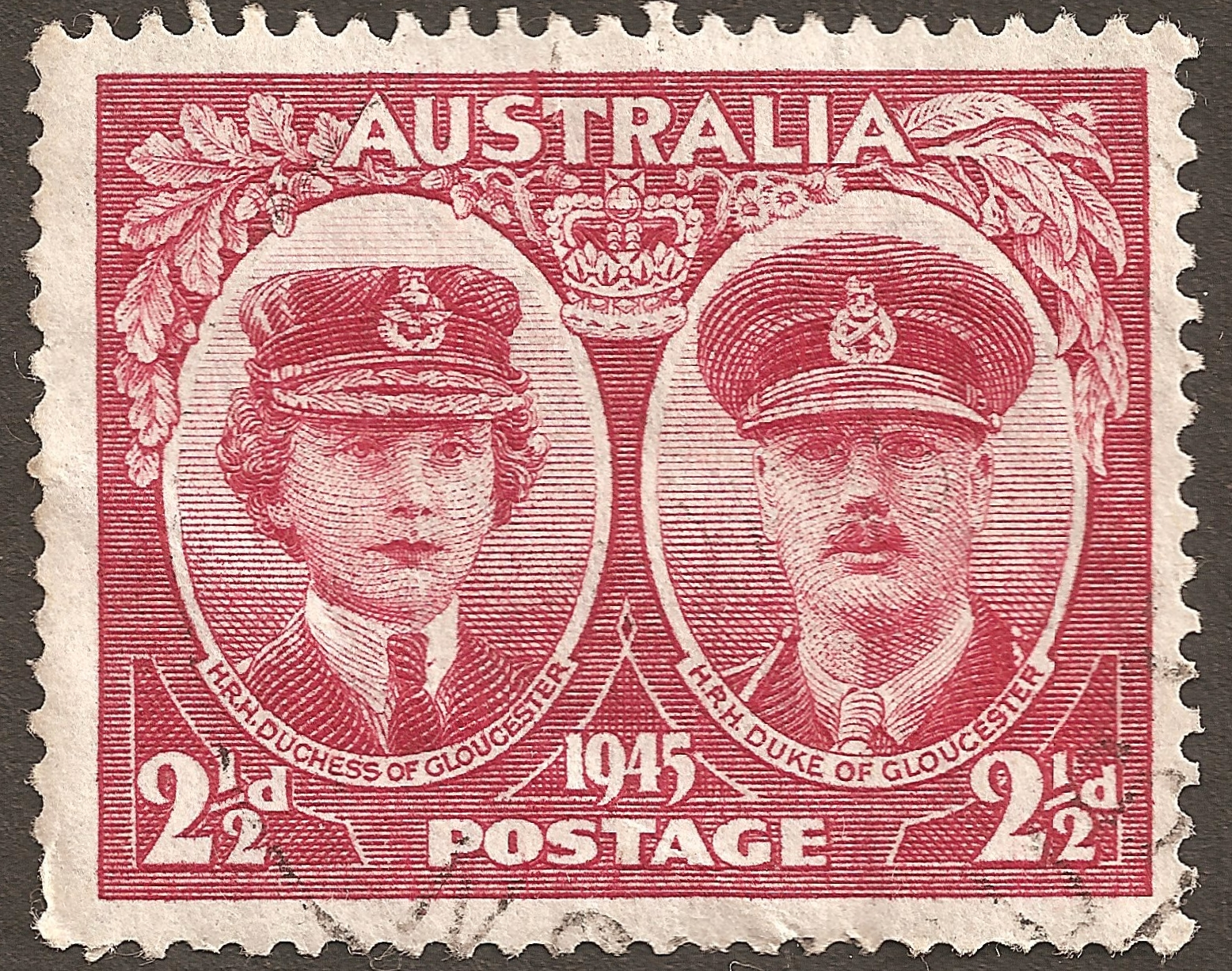
Stamp of Australia, 1945, showing Henry and Alice, when he became Governor-General

In May 1949, May 1961, May 1962, and May 1963, Henry served as Lord High Commissioner to the General Assembly of the Church of Scotland, a role that temporarily placed him in precedence in Scotland immediately below the King and Queen. He attended the coronation of his niece, Queen Elizabeth II, in 1953, and he and Alice continued to undertake royal engagements, including several overseas tours. In 1954, Henry was Treasurer of the Honourable Society of Gray's Inn, and in 1957 he represented Elizabeth II at the Malayan Declaration of Independence on 31 August.

He suffered a series of strokes in later life. The first occurred in 1965 while he and Alice were returning by car from Sir Winston Churchill's funeral, causing a crash. Further strokes left him dependent on a wheelchair and unable to speak during his final years. His last public appearance was in 1967 at the unveiling of Queen Mary's plaque at Marlborough House, where he appeared frail and noticeably older than the Duke of Windsor. By 1972, his health had deteriorated to the extent that he was unable to attend the Duke of Windsor's funeral in May or the wedding of his younger son, Richard, in July. In August, his elder son, William, was killed in a plane crash; Henry's condition was so poor that Alice hesitated to tell him. She later wrote that she chose not to do so, although he may have learned of the death from television coverage.

== Death ==
Henry died on 10 June 1974, aged 74. He was the last surviving son of King George V and Queen Mary, and the last living knight of the Order of St Patrick. He was buried in the Royal Burial Ground, Frogmore.

His will was sealed in London after his death in 1981. His estate was valued at £734,262 equivalent to £5.6 million in 2022 when adjusted for inflation.

His only living son, Richard, inherited the title of Duke of Gloucester. Alice received permission from Queen Elizabeth II to be styled Princess Alice, Duchess of Gloucester, to distinguish her from Richard's wife. She outlived Henry by 30 years, dying on 29 October 2004 at the age of 102, and became the longest-lived member of the British royal family in history.

== In popular culture ==
He was portrayed by Michael Thomas in the third season of the Netflix series The Crown.

== Honours and arms ==
=== Honours ===
Country	Date	Appointment	Ribbon	Post-nominal letters	Reference
United Kingdom	1921	Royal Knight Companion of Order of the Garter		KG	
United Kingdom	1933	Extra Knight of the Order of the Thistle		KT	
United Kingdom	1934	Knight of the Order of St Patrick		KP	
United Kingdom	12 May 1937	Recipient of the King George VI Coronation Medal			
United Kingdom	1942	Great Master and Principal Knight Grand Cross of the Order of the Bath		GCB	
United Kingdom	1935	Knight Grand Cross of the Order of St Michael and St George		GCMG	
United Kingdom	1922	Knight Grand Cross of the Royal Victorian Order		GCVO	
United Kingdom	1939	Grand Prior of the Order of St John		GCStJ	
United Kingdom	1929	Personal aide-de-camp		ADC	
United Kingdom	1932	Recipient of the Royal Victorian Chain			
Norway	20 December 1924	Grand Cross with Collar of the Order of St. Olav			
Japan	1921	Grand Cordon of the Order of the Chrysanthemum			
Japan	1929	Collar of the Order of the Chrysanthemum			
Denmark	24 June 1924	Knight of the Order of the Elephant			
France	May 1927	Grand Cross of the Legion of Honour			
Thailand	17 July 1939	Knight of the Order of the Royal House of Chakri			
Sweden	8 June 1956	Knight of the Order of the Seraphim			
Italy	9 May 1958	Grand Cross of the Order of Merit of the Italian Republic			

==== Military ====
- Colonel in Chief, Gloucestershire Regiment (1935)

=== Arms ===
In 1921, Prince Henry was granted a personal coat of arms, being the royal arms, differenced by a label argent of three points, the centre bearing a lion rampant gules, and the outer points crosses gules.

Prince Henry's coat of arms

Henry's banner of arms, a three-point label, the first and third points charged with the Cross of St. George, the second point charged with a lion passant guardant

Henry's personal banner of arms in Scotland

== Ancestry ==
Ancestors of Prince Henry, Duke of Gloucester

8. Prince Albert of Saxe-Coburg and Gotha
4. Edward VII of the United Kingdom
9. Victoria of the United Kingdom
2. George V of the United Kingdom
10. Christian IX of Denmark
5. Princess Alexandra of Denmark
11. Princess Louise of Hesse-Kassel
1. Prince Henry, Duke of Gloucester
12. Duke Alexander of Württemberg
6. Francis, Duke of Teck
13. Countess Claudine Rhédey von Kis-Rhéde
3. Princess Victoria Mary of Teck
14. Prince Adolphus, Duke of Cambridge
7. Princess Mary Adelaide of Cambridge
15. Princess Augusta of Hesse-Kassel

== Notes ==
Prince Henry, Duke of Gloucester House of Windsor Cadet branch of the House of Wettin Born: 31 March 1900 Died: 10 June 1974
Government offices
Preceded by Alexander Hore-Ruthven, 1st Earl of Gowrie	Governor-General of Australia; 1945–1947	Succeeded by William McKell
Honorary titles
Preceded by Prince Arthur, Duke of Connaught and Strathearn	Great Master of the Order of the Bath; 1942–1974	Succeeded by Charles, Prince of Wales
Preceded by Philip Cunliffe-Lister, 1st Earl of Swinton	Senior Privy Counsellor; 1972–1974	Succeeded by Henry Slesser
Peerage of the United Kingdom
New title 5th creation	Duke of Gloucester; 1928–1974	Succeeded by Prince Richard
