= Sir William Heathcote, 5th Baronet =

Sir William Heathcote, 5th Baronet, PC (17 May 1801 – 17 August 1881), was a British landowner and Conservative politician.

== Background and education ==
Heathcote was the son of Reverend William Heathcote, second son of Sir William Heathcote, 3rd Baronet. His mother was Elizabeth, daughter of Lovelace Bigg-Wither. He was educated at Winchester and Oriel College, Oxford. In 1825 he succeeded his uncle as fifth Baronet of Hursley as well as to the family seat of Hursley House, Hursley, Hampshire.

== Political career ==
Heathcote entered Parliament as one of two representatives (MPs) for Hampshire in 1826, a seat he held until 1831, and in the previous year described by commentators as among those voting with the group known as Ultra-Tories. He was re-elected next as MP for Hampshire North between 1837 and 1849 and for Oxford University between 1854 and 1868. He never held ministerial office but was sworn of the Privy Council in 1870. He was High Sheriff of Hampshire for 1832–33.

Heathcote was a member of the Canterbury Association from 27 March 1848.

== Family ==
Heathcote was twice married. He married firstly the Hon. Caroline Frances, daughter of Charles Perceval, 2nd Baron Arden, in 1825. They had three sons and one daughter. After her death in March 1835 he married secondly Selina, daughter of Evelyn Shirley, in 1841. They had eight children. Heathcote died in August 1881, aged 80, and was succeeded in the baronetcy by his eldest son from his first marriage, William. His widow, Lady Heathcote (née Selina Shirley) died in July 1901, having sold Hursley House to Joseph William Baxendale, of the Pickfords logistics company.

Parliament of the United Kingdom
| Preceded by John Willis Fleming; George Purefoy-Jervoise | Member of Parliament for Hampshire; 1826–1831; With: John Willis Fleming | Succeeded by Sir James Macdonald, Bt; Charles Shaw-Lefevre |
| Preceded by Charles Shaw-Lefevre; James Winter Scott | Member of Parliament for Hampshire North; 1837–1849; With: Charles Shaw-Lefevre | Succeeded by Charles Shaw-Lefevre; Melville Portal |
| Preceded by Sir Robert Inglis, Bt; William Ewart Gladstone | Member of Parliament for Oxford University; 1854–1868; With: William Ewart Gladstone 1854–1865; Gathorne Hardy 1865–1868 | Succeeded by Gathorne Hardy; John Mowbray |
Baronetage of Great Britain
| Preceded by Thomas Freeman-Heathcote | Baronet (of Hursley); 1825–1881 | Succeeded by William Perceval Heathcote |
