= List of longest-living members of the British royal family =

Thirty-one members of the British royal family (Note: This list consists of British royal family members entitled (in the earliest cases retroactively) to the styles of His or Her Royal Highness or His or Her Majesty, as defined by Letters Patent in 1864, 1898, 1917, 1996, and 2012. According to the aforementioned Letters Patent, British royal family members entitled to the style of Royal Highness are the children and male-line grandchildren of the British monarch and previous British monarchs, the children of the eldest son of the Prince of Wales, and all their current or widowed spouses. This list also includes those male-line descendants of British monarchs who, prior to 1917, were entitled to the "style and attribute" of His or Her Highness with the designation of a "Prince (or Princess) of the United Kingdom of Great Britain and Ireland.") have lived to the age of 80 years or older since the Acts of Union 1707 established the Kingdom of Great Britain. These British royal family members consist of 2 centenarians, 10 nonagenarians, and 19 octogenarians.

Of the British royals who have lived to 80 years or longer, 23 have been women and 8 have been men. Eighteen of the 31 royals aged 80 or older have been members of the British royal family by blood and 12 have been members through marriage, and only Princess Mary, Duchess of Gloucester and Edinburgh (1776–1857), was titled as a member of the British royal family by both blood and marriage. Four of the British royals who lived 80 years or longer were deprived of their British peerages and royal titles in 1919 under the Titles Deprivation Act 1917 as the children or spouses of enemies of the United Kingdom during World War I and are indicated below with asterisks (*).

The longest-living member of the British royal family has been Princess Alice, Duchess of Gloucester (1901–2004), who lived to be 102 years and 309 days old. The longest-living member of the British royal family from birth is Princess Alice, Countess of Athlone (1883–1981). Queen Elizabeth the Queen Mother (1900–2002) is the second-longest living British royal, living to 101 years and 238 days old. The current oldest living member of the British royal family is Prince Edward, Duke of Kent (born 1935), who is the eleventh longest-living British royal. Elizabeth II (1926–2022) was the longest-ever reigning British monarch (70 years, 214 days) and the fifth longest-living royal (96 years, 140 days).

== List of British royal family members by lifespan ==
All persons are listed below by their British royal titles by birth, grant, or by marriage. However, some of these individuals are better known by other titles.

Rank	Name (Note: As this is a list of British royal family members, individuals are listed by their British royal title by birth, grant, or by marriage.)	Portrait	Relation (Note: Those deriving their British titles by birth are shown by relation "to" the parent from whose title theirs derived; those deriving their titles by marriage are shown by relation "to" the spouse to whom their marriage from whom the title automatically (for wives) or by grant derived; Princess Mary, Duchess of Gloucester and Edinburgh was "Princess Mary" as a daughter of George III and "Duchess of Gloucester and Edinburgh" by marriage to her first cousin Prince William Frederick, Duke of Gloucester and Edinburgh.)		Lifespan (Note: To maintain consistency within the table, the dates of birth and death are given in the New Style.)		Duration	
Rank	Name	Portrait	By	To	From	To	(days)	(years, days)
1	Princess Alice, Duchess of Gloucester	Princess Alice, Duchess of Gloucester	Marriage	Prince Henry, Duke of Gloucester	25 December 1901	29 October 2004	37,564	102 years, 309 days
2	Queen Elizabeth the Queen Mother	Queen Elizabeth the Queen Mother	Marriage	George VI	4 August 1900	30 March 2002	37,128	101 years, 238 days
3	Prince Philip, Duke of Edinburgh (Note: Letters Patent on 20 November 1947 entitled then Lieutenant Sir Philip Mountbatten to "hold and enjoy the title, style and attribute of Royal Highness." Letters Patent on 22 February 1957 gave then Philip, Duke of Edinburgh, "the style and titular dignity of a Prince of the United Kingdom of Great Britain and Northern Ireland.")	Prince Philip, Duke of Edinburgh	Marriage	Elizabeth II	10 June 1921	9 April 2021	36,463	99 years, 303 days
4	Princess Alice of Albany	Princess Alice of Albany	Blood	Prince Leopold, Duke of Albany	25 February 1883	3 January 1981	35,741	97 years, 313 days
5	Elizabeth II	Elizabeth II	Blood	George VI	21 April 1926	8 September 2022	35,204	96 years, 140 days
6	Princess Augusta of Cambridge	Princess Augusta of Cambridge	Blood	Prince Adolphus, Duke of Cambridge	19 July 1822	5 December 1916	34,472	94 years, 139 days
7	Katharine, Duchess of Kent	Katharine, Duchess of Kent	Marriage	Prince Edward, Duke of Kent	22 February 1933	4 September 2025	33,797	92 years, 194 days
8	Prince Arthur, Duke of Connaught and Strathearn	Prince Arthur, Duke of Connaught and Strathearn	Blood	Victoria	1 May 1850	16 January 1942	33,497	91 years, 260 days
9	Princess Louise	Princess Louise	Blood	Victoria	18 March 1848	3 December 1939	33,496	91 years, 260 days
10	Augusta, Duchess of Cambridge	Augusta, Duchess of Cambridge	Marriage	Prince Adolphus, Duke of Cambridge	25 July 1797	6 April 1889	33,492	91 years, 255 days
11	Prince Edward, Duke of Kent	Prince Edward, Duke of Kent	Blood	Prince George, Duke of Kent	9 October 1935	Alive	33,280	91 years, 42 days
12	Prince George William of Cumberland *	Prince George William of Hanover.	Blood	Prince Ernest Augustus of Cumberland *	25 March 1915	8 January 2006	33,162	90 years, 289 days
13	Princess Alexandra of Kent	Princess Alexandra of Kent	Blood	Prince George, Duke of Kent	25 December 1936	Alive	32,837	89 years, 330 days
14	Marie, Duchess of Cumberland and Teviotdale	Marie, Duchess of Cumberland and Teviotdale	Marriage	Prince George, Duke of Cumberland and Teviotdale	14 April 1818	9 January 1907	32,411	88 years, 270 days
15	Victoria Louise, Princess Ernest Augustus of Cumberland *	Victoria Louise, Princess Ernest Augustus of Cumberland	Marriage	Prince Ernest Augustus of Cumberland *	13 September 1892	11 December 1980	32,230	88 years, 89 days
16	Princess Patricia of Connaught	Princess Patricia of Connaught	Blood	Prince Arthur, Duke of Connaught and Strathearn	17 March 1886	12 January 1974	32,077	87 years, 301 days
17	Princess Beatrice	Princess Beatrice	Blood	Victoria	14 April 1857	26 October 1944	31,971	87 years, 195 days
18	Queen Mary	Queen Mary	Marriage	George V	26 May 1867	24 March 1953	31,348	85 years, 302 days
19	Prince George, Duke of Cambridge	Prince George, Duke of Cambridge	Blood	Prince Adolphus, Duke of Cambridge	26 March 1819	17 March 1904	31,037	84 years, 357 days
20	Victoria Adelaide, Duchess of Albany *	Victoria Adelaide, Duchess of Albany	Marriage	Prince Charles Edward, Duke of Albany *	31 December 1885	3 October 1970	30,956	84 years, 276 days
21	Prince Michael of Kent	Prince Michael of Kent	Blood	Prince George, Duke of Kent	4 July 1942	Alive	30,820	84 years, 139 days
22	Prince Richard, Duke of Gloucester	Prince Richard, Duke of Gloucester	Blood	Prince; Henry, Duke of Gloucester	26 August 1944	Alive	30,036	82 years, 86 days
23	Princess Beatrice of Edinburgh	Princess Beatrice of Edinburgh	Blood	Prince Alfred, Duke of Edinburgh	20 April 1884	13 July 1966	30,033	82 years, 84 days
24	Princess Michael of Kent	Princess Michael of Kent	Marriage	Prince Michael of Kent	15 January 1945	Alive	29,894	81 years, 309 days
25	Victoria	Victoria	Blood	Prince Edward, Duke of Kent and Strathearn	24 May 1819	22 January 1901	29,828	81 years, 243 days
26	George III	George III	Blood	Frederick, Prince of Wales	4 June 1738	29 January 1820	29,823	81 years, 239 days
27	Princess Mary, Duchess of Gloucester and Edinburgh	Princess Mary, Duchess of Gloucester and Edinburgh	Blood	George III	25 April 1776	30 April 1857	29,589	81 years, 5 days
27	Princess Mary, Duchess of Gloucester and Edinburgh	Princess Mary, Duchess of Gloucester and Edinburgh	Marriage	Prince William Frederick, Duke of Gloucester and Edinburgh	25 April 1776	30 April 1857	29,589	81 years, 5 days
28	Queen Alexandra	Queen Alexandra	Marriage	Edward VII	1 December 1844	20 November 1925	29,573	80 years, 354 days
29	Princess Alexandra of Cumberland *	Princess Alexandra of Cumberland	Blood	Prince Ernest Augustus, Duke of Cumberland and Teviotdale *	29 September 1882	30 August 1963	29,554	80 years, 335 days
30	Prince Ernest Augustus, Duke of Cumberland and Teviotdale (Note: On 23 April 1799, Prince Ernest Augustus was granted the "Names, Styles, and Titles of Duke of Cumberland, and of Teviotdale, in the Kingdom of Great Britain, and of Earl of Armagh, in the Kingdom of Ireland.")	Prince Ernest Augustus, Duke of Cumberland	Blood	George III	5 June 1771	18 November 1851	29,385	80 years, 166 days
31	Birgitte, Duchess of Gloucester	Birgitte, Duchess of Gloucester	Marriage	Prince Richard, Duke of Gloucester	20 June 1946	Alive	29,373	80 years, 153 days

== See also ==
- List of monarchs in Britain by length of reign
- List of centenarians (royalty and nobility)
- List of longest-reigning monarchs
