= Charles Shaw-Lefevre, 1st Viscount Eversley =

British politician (1794–1888)

The Right Honourable The Viscount Eversley GCB PC
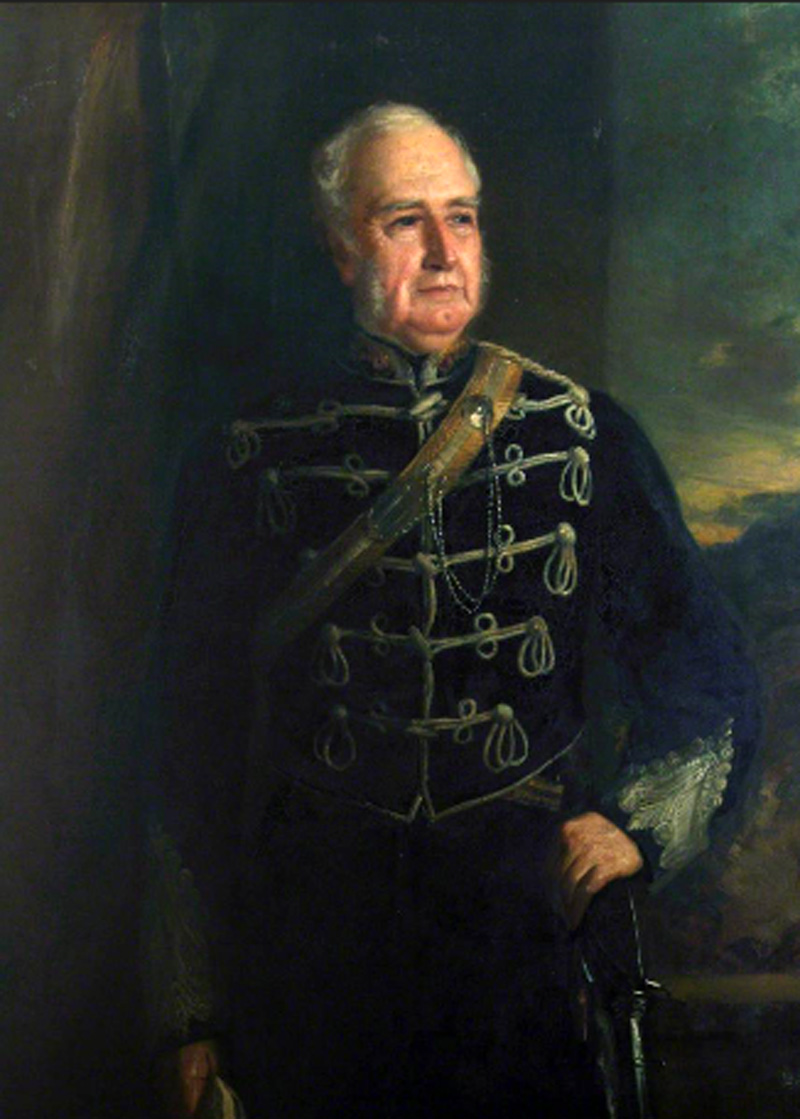
- Lord Eversley, 1875 portrait

Speaker of the House of Commons of the United Kingdom
- In office 27 May 1839 – 30 April 1857
- Monarch: Victoria
- Prime Minister: William Lamb; John Russell; Edward Smith-Stanley; George Hamilton-Gordon; Henry John Temple
- Preceded by: Hon. James Abercromby
- Succeeded by: Sir Evelyn Denison

Personal details
- Born: 22 February 1794 London, England
- Died: 28 December 1888 (aged 94)
- Party: Whig
- Spouse: Emma Whitbread (d. 1857)
- Education: Trinity College, Cambridge

Charles Shaw-Lefevre, 1st Viscount Eversley, GCB, PC (22 February 1794 – 28 December 1888), was a British Whig politician. He served as Speaker of the House of Commons from 1839 to 1857. He is the second-longest serving Speaker of the House of Commons, behind Arthur Onslow.

== Background and education ==
Shaw-Lefevre was the son of Charles Shaw-Lefevre by his wife Helena, daughter of John Lefevre. His younger brother, Sir John Shaw-Lefevre, was a senior civil servant and one of the founders of the University of London, while his nephew, George, was a Liberal politician. He was educated at Winchester and Trinity College, Cambridge. In 1819 he was called to the Bar, Lincoln's Inn.

== Political career ==
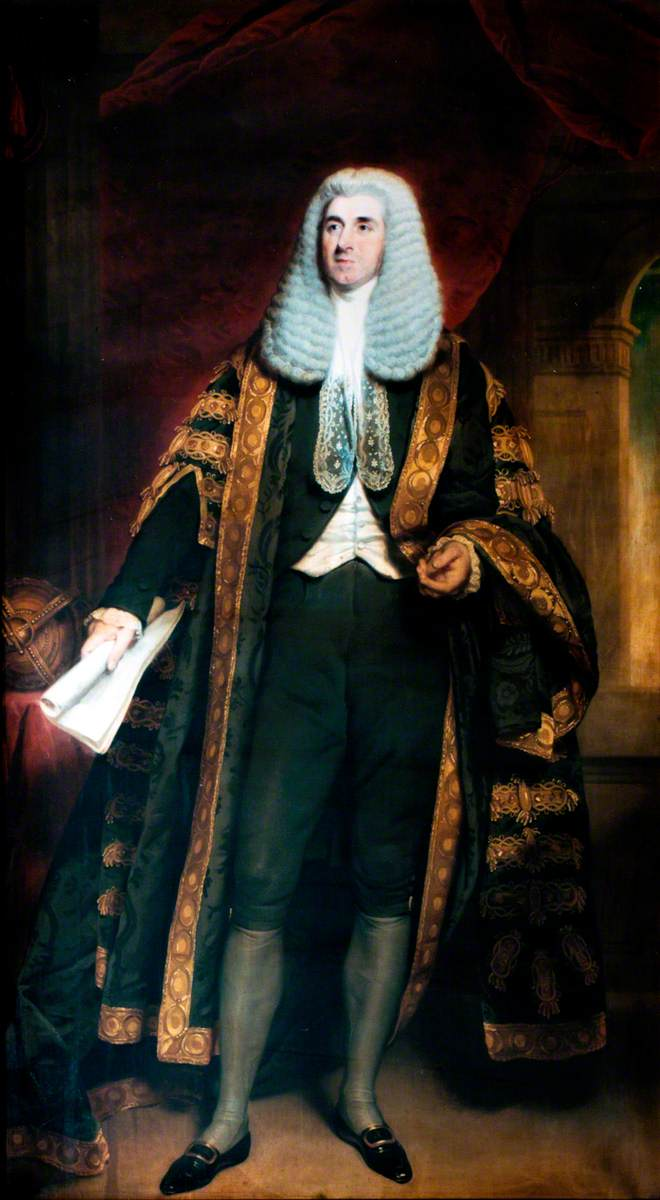
Charles Shaw-Lefevre as Speaker of the House of Commons, by Martin Archer Shee.

A Whig, he was Member of Parliament for Downton from 1830 to 1831, for Hampshire from 1831 to 1832 and for North Hampshire from 1832 to 1857. During the 1830s he was chairman of a committee on petitions for private bills and of a committee on agricultural distress. His report from the latter position was not accepted by the House of Commons but was published as a pamphlet addressed to his constituents. He acquired, says the Encyclopædia Britannica, "a high reputation in the House of Commons for his judicial fairness, combined with singular tact and courtesy." When James Abercromby retired as Speaker of the House of Commons in 1839, Shaw-Lefevre was put forward as the Whig candidate and defeated the Tory candidate Henry Goulburn by 317 votes to 299. He was sworn of the Privy Council at the same time.

Shaw-Lefevre remained speaker until 1857, by which time he was second-longest-serving speaker ever, after Arthur Onslow, who held the post for more than 33 years. On his retirement in 1857 he was elevated to the peerage as Viscount Eversley, of Heckfield in the County of Southampton. He attended the House of Lords infrequently, with his last recorded speech in July 1873.

== Other work ==
Shaw-Lefevre was director of the insurance company Sun Fire Office from 1815 to 1841, Recorder of Basingstoke 1823–35, and Chairman of Hampshire Quarter Sessions 1850–79. He also served in his father's North Hampshire Yeomanry Cavalry as a lieutenant in 1821, and was Lieutenant-Colonel Commandant in 1823–27 and 1831–68, when he became its Honorary Lt-Col.

In 1857 he was appointed Governor of the Isle of Wight, which he remained until 1888. He was also an ecclesiastical commissioner and a trustee of the British Museum. In 1885 he was made a Knight Grand Cross of the Order of the Bath (GCB).

== Family ==
Lord Eversley married Emma Laura (d. 1857), daughter of Samuel Whitbread and Lady Elizabeth Grey, in 1817. They had three sons, who all died in infancy, and two daughters. The family lived at Heckfield Place in Hampshire, which was previously the seat of his maternal grandfather. Lady Eversley died in June 1857. Lord Eversley survived her by over thirty years and died in December 1888, aged 94. He is buried at Kensal Green Cemetery, London. As he had no surviving sons, the title became extinct on his death. The Eversley title was revived in 1906 in favour of his nephew, George Shaw-Lefevre.

== Arms ==
Coat of arms of Charles Shaw-Lefevre, 1st Viscount Eversley
Crest Six Arrows interlaced saltirewise three and three proper within an Annulet Or Escutcheon Quarterly: 1st and 4th, Sable a Chevron Argent between in chief two Trefoils slipped Or and base a Bezant therefrom issuant a Cross Pattée of the third (Lefevre); 2nd and 3rd, Sable a Chevron Ermine on a Canton Or a Talbot's Head erased Gules (Shaw) Supporters On either side a Talbot that on the dexter Gules on the sinister Sable each charged on the shoulder with a Mace erect Gold Motto Sans Changer

Parliament of the United Kingdom
Preceded by Bartholomew Bouverie; Alexander Powell	Member of Parliament for Downton; 1830–1831; With: James Brougham	Succeeded by James Brougham; Thomas Creevey
Preceded by John Willis Fleming; Sir Thomas Baring	Member of Parliament for Hampshire; 1831–1832; With: Sir James Macdonald 1831–1832; Sir William Heathcote 1832	Constituency abolished
New constituency	Member of Parliament for Hampshire North; 1832–1857; With: James Winter Scott 1832–1857; Sir William Heathcote 1837–1849; Melville Portal 1849–1857	Succeeded by Bramston Beach; George Sclater-Booth
Political offices
Preceded by James Abercromby	Speaker of the House of Commons of the United Kingdom; 1839–1857	Succeeded by Sir Evelyn Denison
Honorary titles
Preceded by The Lord Heytesbury	Governor of the Isle of Wight; 1857–1888	Succeeded by Prince Henry of Battenberg
Church of England titles
Preceded by Sir John Shaw Lefevre	Second Church Estates Commissioner; 1858–1859	Succeeded by Edward Pleydell Bouverie
Peerage of the United Kingdom
New creation	Viscount Eversley; 1857–1888	Extinct
