= George Limbrey Sclater-Booth, 2nd Baron Basing =

British army general (1960 - 1919)

Brigadier-General The Right Honourable The Lord Basing CB DL JP
- Born: 1 January 1860; New Street, Spring Garden, Whitehall
- Died: 8 April 1919 (aged 59); Hoddington House, Hampshire
- Military career
- Allegiance: United Kingdom
- Branch: British Army
- Service years: 1892–
- Rank: Brigadier-General
- Unit: 1st Royal Dragoons
- Conflicts: Second Boer War
- Awards: Companion of the Order of the Bath; Order of the Red Eagle, Third Class
- Education: Eton College; Balliol College, Oxford
- Spouse: Mary Hargreaves (m. 1889; died 1904)
- Parents: George Sclater-Booth, 1st Baron Basing (father); Lydia Caroline Birch (mother)

Brigadier-General George Limbrey Sclater-Booth, 2nd Baron Basing, CB, DL, JP (1 January 1860 – 8 April 1919) was a British Army officer, peer and civic leader in Hampshire.

== Life ==
Sclater-Booth was the son of George Sclater-Booth, 1st Baron Basing and his wife Lydia Caroline Birch. He was educated at Eton College and Balliol College, Oxford.

He succeeded his father as Baron Basing in 1894, held the office of Justice of the Peace (JP), and was a Deputy Lieutenant for Hampshire.

== Military service ==
Sclater-Booth was commissioned a lieutenant in the 1st (Royal) Dragoons on 2 August 1892. He was promoted to captain on 1 October 1897, and major on 2 February 1898.

After the outbreak of the Second Boer War in October 1899, the 1st Dragoons was sent to South Africa where it arrived at Durban in November. Under the command of Lord Basing, the regiment formed part of the force sent to relieve Ladysmith, taking part in the battles of Colenso (December 1899), Spion Kop (January 1900), and the Tugela Heights (February 1900). From June 1900 to April 1901 the regiment was employed guarding the Buffalo River and the Transvaal approaches to the Drakensberg. Lord Basing received the brevet rank of lieutenant-colonel on 29 November 1900, and in late Spring 1901 he was given an independent command, composed of his own regiment and the necessary complement of artillery. Lord Basing's column was the only purely regimental column formed during the war. In July and August 1901 the column operated in the country of the Magaliesberg and Western Transvaal. During the rest of the war they were employed in the Orange River Colony. On 2 February 1902 Lord Basing was promoted to the full rank of lieutenant-colonel and appointed formally in command of the regiment. For his service in the war, he was mentioned in despatches twice and earned the Queen's South Africa Medal with six clasps: Transvaal, Orange Free State, Cape Colony, Relief of Ladysmith, Tugela Heights, Laing's Nek, and the King's South Africa Medal with both clasps. He was also appointed a Companion of the Order of the Bath in 1902.

He spent some time in India in an official capacity, with a small account of his daily life and dealings there being contained within chapter three of the book My Mother Told Me by Charles Chenevix Trench, recounted to the author by May Hargreaves.

He was awarded the 2nd class of the Prussian Order of the Red Eagle in late 1902, following an inspection of the Royal Dragoons by Emperor Wilhelm II, who was colonel-in-chief of the regiment. (Note: A 2019-auction included a letter from Buckingham Palace dated November 1911 reading "I have the honour to inform you that The King has been graciously pleased to give you Private Permission to wear the insignia of the Order of the Red Eagle, which was conferred upon you by the German Emperor and King of Prussia.” being known to exist.)

Lord Basing died aged 59 at Hoddington House, near Upton Grey in Hampshire, England, and was buried in St. Mary's Churchyard, Upton Grey, Basingstoke and Dean Borough, Hampshire.

== Family ==
Lord Basing married Mary Hargreaves on 12 December 1889 at Maiden Early, Berkshire.

His wife died in India on 1 June 1904, with the book Records of the Family of Sclater stating that George became disinterested with life thereafter.

== Notes ==
Peerage of the United Kingdom
Preceded by George Sclater-Booth	Baron Basing; 1902–1919	Succeeded by John Sclater-Booth
