= Rotherfield Park =

Country house and estate in Hampshire, England

Coordinates: 51.0858°N 1.0094°W

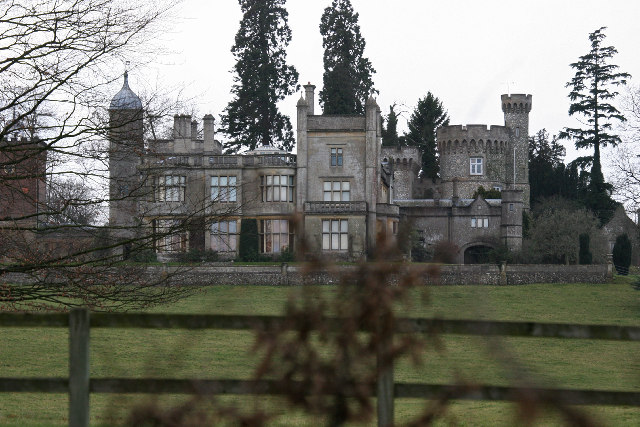
- House of Rotherfield Park
- Interactive map of the Rotherfield Park area

General information
- Location: East Tisted, East Hampshire, England

Design and construction
- Architect: Joseph T. Parkinson

Rotherfield Park is a country house and estate located in East Tisted, East Hampshire in England. The park originated as a medieval hunting park, which may have been predated by a settlement and was later in the 18th century turned into pleasure grounds. The land owned by the park stretches across much of East Hampshire and includes fields in Colemore, Priors Dean, East Tisted and other parishes. In 1815–21 large changes were made to the older estate house; the designs were made by architect Joseph T. Parkinson and is a Grade I listed building.

== History ==
Rotherfield Park is an ancient estate first mentioned in 1015 as Hrytherafeld meaning 'the open land for cattle.' There was likely settlement here predating the medieval hunting park which is first mentioned in the 16th century. The evidence for the park can still be seen today as a complex of ditches running around the estate. The estate has undergone a number of changes over the centuries, the first major one being the creation of pleasure grounds there in the 18th century, of which many features still exist. A detailed map of the estate was made at some point in the 1600s (see right), it is likely stored in the Rotherfield Park Estate Archives along with a wealth of other records which has unfortunately been kept hidden from researchers and historians.

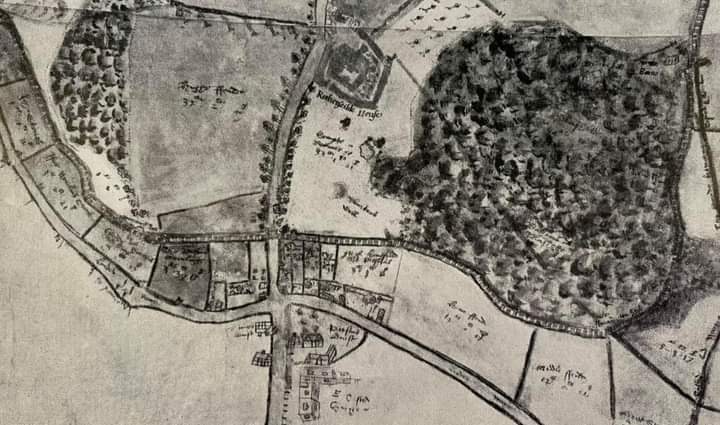
Map of Rotherfield Park and part of East Tisted from the 1600s

== Archaeology ==
Near to the park is a large amount of artifacts of prehistoric activity. Large flint scatters from the Neolithic were uncovered during field walking in the 1970s, and prehistoric ceramic finds dot the area, suggesting settlement. This along with other flint concentrations in nearby Chawton and Ropley suggests a potentially broad area of prehistoric settlement which requires more archaeological attention from local archaeological groups.

== Points of interest ==
The house was owned by the local MP and High Sheriff of Hampshire, James Winter Scott, in the 1860s.

It was used as a filming location for the 1983 feature film House of the Long Shadows, the 1997 TV remake of du Maurier's Rebecca, and the 2006 Agatha Christie's Poirot episode After the Funeral. Rotherfield Park was also used in the fourth season of Grantchester (2019), for the scenes around the manor house owned by the new vicar's parents.

== People ==
- James Scott
- James Winter Scott

== See also ==
- Grade I listed buildings in Hampshire
