= Baron Basing =

Barony in the Peerage of the United Kingdom

Baron Basing, of Basing Byflete and of Hoddington, both in the County of Southampton, is a title in the Peerage of the United Kingdom. It was created in 1887 for the Conservative politician and former President of the Local Government Board, George Sclater-Booth. On his death the title passed to his eldest son, the second Baron, and then to his son, the third Baron. On the latter's death in 1983 this line of the family failed. The title was inherited by the late Baron's first cousin, the fourth Baron. He was the son of Charles Lutle Sclater-Booth, second son of the first Baron. As of 2010 the title is held by the fourth Baron's grandson, the sixth Baron, who succeeded his father in 2007.

The family surname of Sclater-Booth is pronounced "Slater-Booth".

== Barons Basing (1887) ==
- George Sclater-Booth, 1st Baron Basing (1826–1894)
- George Limbrey Sclater-Booth, 2nd Baron Basing (1860–1919)
- John Limbrey Robert Sclater-Booth, 3rd Baron Basing (1890–1969)
- George Lutley Sclater-Booth, 4th Baron Basing (1903–1983)
- Neil Lutley Sclater-Booth, 5th Baron Basing (1939–2007)
- Stuart Anthony Whitfield Sclater-Booth, 6th Baron Basing (b. 1969)

The heir apparent is the present holder's son Luke Waters Sclater-Booth (b. 2000)
