= Neil Sclater-Booth, 5th Baron Basing =

British Baron (1939–2007)

Neil Lutley Sclater-Booth, 5th Baron Basing (16 January 1939 – 24 November 2007) was a British nobleman and New York financier.

The son of George Sclater-Booth, 4th Baron Basing, he was educated at St Peter's Court, Broadstairs, and Eton College, and graduated with an economics degree from Harvard University, where he played rugby. Sclater-Booth worked in securities, becoming Executive Vice President of Akroyd & Smithers, Inc., and President of Standard New York, Inc., the American subsidiary of Standard New York Securities.

He succeeded his father as Baron Basing in 1983, but did not use the title. By his wife, Patricia, he had two sons:

- Stuart Sclater-Booth, 6th Baron Basing (born 1969)
- Andrew Limbrey Sclater-Booth (born 1973)

Sclater-Booth died of esophageal cancer in 2007.

Peerage of the United Kingdom
Preceded by George Sclater-Booth	Baron Basing; 1983–2007	Succeeded by Stuart Sclater-Booth
