= George Sclater-Booth, 1st Baron Basing =

British politician

The Right Honourable The Lord Basing PC FRS DL
- Sclater-Booth, c. 1871

President of the Local Government Board
- In office 1874–1880
- Monarch: Victoria
- Prime Minister: Benjamin Disraeli
- Preceded by: James Stansfeld
- Succeeded by: John George Dodson

Financial Secretary to the Treasury
- In office 4 March 1868 – 1 December 1868
- Preceded by: George Ward Hunt
- Succeeded by: Acton Smee Ayrton

Personal details
- Born: 19 May 1826 London
- Died: 22 October 1894 (aged 68) Hoddington House, Hampshire
- Party: Conservative
- Spouse: Lydia Birch (d. 1881)
- Education: Balliol College, Oxford

George Limbrey Sclater-Booth, 1st Baron Basing PC, FRS, DL (19 May 1826 – 22 October 1894), known as George Sclater-Booth before 1887, was a British Conservative politician. He served as President of the Local Government Board under Benjamin Disraeli between 1874 and 1880.

== Background and education ==
Born George Sclater, Basing was the son of William Lutley Sclater, of Hoddington House, Hampshire, and Anna Maria, daughter of William Bowyer. His brother was the naturalist Philip Sclater. He was educated at Winchester and Balliol College, Oxford, and was called to the Bar, Inner Temple, in 1851. In 1857 he assumed by Royal licence the additional surname of Booth to fulfil the will of Anna Maria Booth.

== Political career ==
Basing was elected Member of Parliament for North Hampshire in 1857, which constituency he would represent until 1885, when the constituency was divided. He was then returned for Basingstoke, one of the new divisions of his old constituency, for which he sat until being made a peer in 1887. His first position in government was that of Parliamentary Secretary to the Poor Law Board in Lord Derby's third and final ministry, replacing Ralph Anstruther Earle (formerly Disraeli's private secretary), who had resigned over the Reform Bill of 1867. He later served as Financial Secretary to the Treasury in Benjamin Disraeli's short-lived 1868 government. When the Conservatives returned to power in 1874 under Disraeli he was made President of the Local Government Board, which post he held until the fall of the government in 1880. He was sworn of the Privy Council in 1874. In May 1874, he proposed an amendment to the Alkali Act 1863 which had aimed to curb muriatic acid gas emissions from factories using the Leblanc Process. Booth's Alkali Act Amendment Bill came into force on 1 March 1875. In 1887, he was raised to the peerage as Baron Basing, of Basing Byflete and of Hoddington, both in the County of Southampton.

He was elected a Fellow of the Royal Society in 1876.

== Family ==
Lord Basing married Lydia Caroline, daughter of George Birch, in 1857. They had four sons and six daughters. She died in July 1881. Lord Basing survived her by thirteen years and died at Hoddington House, Hampshire, in October 1894, aged 68. He was succeeded in the barony by his eldest son, George.

In 1898 his daughter Eleanor Birch Sclater-Booth married Henry Wilson-Fox, who was later a Conservative MP.

Parliament of the United Kingdom
Preceded by Charles Shaw-Lefevre; James Scott	Member of Parliament for North Hampshire; 1857 – 1885; With: Bramston Beach	Constituency divided
New constituency	Member of Parliament for Basingstoke; 1885 – 1887	Succeeded by Arthur Frederick Jeffreys
Political offices
Preceded by Ralph Anstruther Earle	Parliamentary Secretary to the Poor Law Board; 1867 – 1868	Succeeded by Sir Michael Hicks Beach, Bt
Preceded by George Ward Hunt	Financial Secretary to the Treasury; 1868	Succeeded by Acton Smee Ayrton
Preceded by James Stansfeld	President of the Local Government Board; 1874 – 1880	Succeeded by John George Dodson
Peerage of the United Kingdom
New creation	Baron Basing; 1887 – 1894	Succeeded by George Sclater-Booth
