= North Hampshire (constituency) =

Former parliamentary constituency in the United Kingdom

- Former county constituency for the House of Commons
- County: Hampshire

1832–1885
- Seats: Two
- Created from: Hampshire
- Replaced by: Basingstoke or Northern Hampshire, Andover or West Hampshire, Petersfield or East Hampshire

North Hampshire (formally the Northern division of Hampshire) was a constituency as one of two in the county of Hampshire proper, which returned two Members of Parliament (MPs) to the House of Commons of the UK Parliament between 1832 and 1885. Its members were elected by the bloc vote version of the first-past-the-post system.

It was created under the Great Reform Act for the 1832 general election, and abolished by the Redistribution of Seats Act 1885 for the 1885 general election.

== Creation, boundaries and abolition ==
The county was created as one of three divisions of Hampshire as Hampshire formerly included the Isle of Wight to make up a large area and large-electorate two-member seat due to a growing number of tiny electorate increasingly rotten boroughs since the 13th century until this was abolished under the Great Reform Act 1832.

1832–1885: The Petty Sessional Divisions of Alton, Andover, Basingstoke, King's Clere [Kingsclere], Droxford, Odiham, Petersfield and Winchester.

Under the Redistribution of Seats Act 1885 the seat was abolished; replaced by three seats:

- Basingstoke or Northern Hampshire - this took in the town and two sessional divisions in the mid-north
- Andover or West Hampshire - this took in Andover and Kingsclere sessional divisions and Winchester city
- Petersfield or East Hampshire - this took in Alton, Droxford and Petersfield sessional divisions and the rest of Winchester sessional division (including the town of Alresford)

== Members of Parliament ==
Election	1st Member	1st Party	Notes	2nd Member	2nd Party	Notes
1832	Charles Shaw-Lefevre	Whig	Speaker from 1839 to 1857; Created Lord Eversley in 1857	James Winter Scott	Whig	
1837	Charles Shaw-Lefevre	Whig	Speaker from 1839 to 1857; Created Lord Eversley in 1857	Sir William Heathcote, Bt	Conservative	
1849 by-election	Charles Shaw-Lefevre	Whig	Speaker from 1839 to 1857; Created Lord Eversley in 1857	Melville Portal	Conservative	
1857	William Wither Bramston Beach	Conservative		George Sclater-Booth	Conservative	Created Lord Basing
1885 constituency abolished

== Election results ==
=== Elections in the 1830s ===
General election 1832: North Hampshire
Party	Candidate	Votes	%
Whig	Charles Shaw-Lefevre	1,111	30.7
Whig	James Winter Scott	1,082	29.9
Tory	Arthur Wellesley	723	20.0
Tory	Walter Long	701	19.4
Majority		359	9.9
Turnout		1,810	74.7
Registered electors		2,424	
Whig win (new seat)			
Whig win (new seat)			

General election 1835: North Hampshire
Party	Candidate	Votes	%
Whig	Charles Shaw-Lefevre	Unopposed	
Whig	James Winter Scott	Unopposed	
Registered electors		2,694	
Whig hold			
Whig hold			

General election 1837: North Hampshire
Party	Candidate	Votes	%
Whig	Charles Shaw-Lefevre	Unopposed	
Conservative	William Heathcote	Unopposed	
Registered electors		3,616	
Whig hold			
Conservative gain from Whig			

=== Elections in the 1840s ===
General election 1841: North Hampshire
Party	Candidate	Votes	%	±%
Conservative	William Heathcote	Unopposed		
Speaker	Charles Shaw-Lefevre	Unopposed		
Registered electors		3,668		
Conservative hold				
Speaker gain from Whig				

General election 1847: North Hampshire
Party	Candidate	Votes	%	±%
Conservative	William Heathcote	Unopposed		
Speaker	Charles Shaw-Lefevre	Unopposed		
Registered electors		3,411		
Conservative hold				
Speaker hold				

Heathcote resigned by accepting the office of Steward of the Chiltern Hundreds, causing a by-election.

By-election, 6 April 1849: North Hampshire
Party	Candidate	Votes	%	±%
Conservative	Melville Portal	1,199	58.0	N/A
Conservative	William Shaw	868	42.0	N/A
Majority		331	16.0	N/A
Turnout		2,067	62.6	N/A
Registered electors		3,303		
Conservative hold		Swing	N/A	

=== Elections in the 1850s ===
General election 1852: North Hampshire
Party	Candidate	Votes	%	±%
Conservative	Melville Portal	Unopposed		
Speaker	Charles Shaw-Lefevre	Unopposed		
Registered electors		3,596		
Conservative hold				
Speaker hold				

General election 1857: North Hampshire
Party	Candidate	Votes	%	±%
Conservative	William Wither Bramston Beach	1,419	38.8	N/A
Conservative	George Sclater	1,365	37.4	N/A
Whig	Dudley Carleton, 4th Baron Dorchester	869	23.8	New
Majority		496	13.6	N/A
Turnout		2,261 (est)	71.8 (est)	N/A
Registered electors		4,185		
Conservative hold		Swing	N/A	
Conservative gain from Whig		Swing	N/A	

General election 1859: North Hampshire
Party	Candidate	Votes	%	±%
Conservative	William Wither Bramston Beach	Unopposed		
Conservative	George Sclater-Booth	Unopposed		
Registered electors		3,649		
Conservative hold				
Conservative hold				

=== Elections in the 1860s ===
General election 1865: North Hampshire
Party	Candidate	Votes	%	±%
Conservative	William Wither Bramston Beach	1,844	36.4	N/A
Conservative	George Sclater-Booth	1,724	34.1	N/A
Liberal	Henry St John-Mildmay	1,493	29.5	New
Majority		231	4.6	N/A
Turnout		3,277 (est)	78.3 (est)	N/A
Registered electors		4,185		
Conservative hold				
Conservative hold				

General election 1868: North Hampshire
Party	Candidate	Votes	%	±%
Conservative	William Wither Bramston Beach	Unopposed		
Conservative	George Sclater-Booth	Unopposed		
Registered electors		5,744		
Conservative hold				
Conservative hold				

=== Elections in the 1870s ===
General election 1874: North Hampshire
Party	Candidate	Votes	%	±%
Conservative	William Wither Bramston Beach	Unopposed		
Conservative	George Sclater-Booth	Unopposed		
Registered electors		6,033		
Conservative hold				
Conservative hold				

Sclater-Booth was appointed President of the Local Government Board, requiring a by-election.

By-election, 14 Mar 1874: North Hampshire
Party	Candidate	Votes	%	±%
Conservative	George Sclater-Booth	Unopposed		
Conservative hold				

=== Elections in the 1880s ===
General election 1880: North Hampshire
Party	Candidate	Votes	%	±%
Conservative	William Wither Bramston Beach	Unopposed		
Conservative	George Sclater-Booth	Unopposed		
Registered electors		5,783		
Conservative hold				
Conservative hold				

== Sources ==
- Leigh Rayment's Historical List of MPs – Constituencies beginning with "H" (part 1)
- Craig, F. W. S. (1989) [1974]. British parliamentary election results 1885–1918 (2nd ed.). Chichester: Parliamentary Research Services. p. 393. ISBN 0-900178-27-2.

== Notes and references ==
Parliament of the United Kingdom
Preceded by Edinburgh	Constituency represented by the speaker 1839–1857	Succeeded by Nottinghamshire North
