= James Winter Scott =

British Whig politician

James Winter Scott (26 May 1799 – 4 January 1873) was a British Whig politician from Hampshire.

Scott was the son of James Scott who was MP for Bridport from 1820 to 1826.

On 24 January 1828, he married Lucy Jervoise, daughter of Sir Samuel Clarke Jervoise: Scott's brother-in-law, Jervoise, was an MP for the neighbouring South Hampshire seat.

Scott was elected at the 1832 general election as a Member of Parliament (MP) for the newly created Northern division of Hampshire. He was re-elected in 1835, but retired from the House of Commons at the 1837 general election. He made no recorded contribution to debates.

He was nominated as High Sheriff of Hampshire in 1861 and in 1862, and after a third nomination in 1863 he was appointed to the office in 1864, when his address was given as Rotherfield Park, Alton.

Scott and his wife had eight children. The family lived at Rotherfield Park, East Tisted.

Parliament of the United Kingdom
New constituency	Member of Parliament for North Hampshire; 1832 – 1837; With: Charles Shaw-Lefevre	Succeeded by Charles Shaw-Lefevre; Sir William Heathcote, Bt
