= William Fellowes =

William Fellowes may refer to:

- William Fellowes (barrister) (1660–1724), Master in Chancery
- William Fellowes (MP, died 1804) (c. 1726–1804), British member of parliament, MP for Ludlow, and for Andover
- William Henry Fellowes (1769–1837), his son, British member of parliament, MP for Huntingdon, and for Huntingdonshire
- William Fellowes, 2nd Baron de Ramsey (1848–1925), British member of parliament, MP for Huntingdonshire, and for Ramsey
- Billy Fellowes (1910–1987), English footballer
