= Coulson Wallop =

English politician

Coulson Wallop (19 September 1774 – 31 August 1807) was a British Member of Parliament. The younger son of the Earl of Portsmouth, he briefly sat in Parliament on a family interest and later died in captivity in France during the Napoleonic Wars.

Wallop was the third son of John Wallop, 2nd Earl of Portsmouth. He was educated at Eton from 1785 to 1792. On 29 April 1794, he was commissioned a captain of volunteers in the South Hampshire Militia, and was given the captaincy of one of the permanent companies of the regiment on 4 April 1795. Wallop resigned his commission on 24 July 1799.

Wallop was returned for Andover in 1796 on his father's electoral interest. He made little mark in Parliament and supported, at his father's direction, the Pitt ministry. However, he was apparently somewhat mentally deficient, like his eldest brother Viscount Lymington. John King, who had ambitions to enter Parliament, wrote Pitt in 1800 to say that Wallop was "little better than an idiot" and "has spent all his money," so that his mother was willing to put up another candidate for Andover if a pension of £400 a year could be obtained for him. Pitt declined, and Wallop sat in Parliament until the next election, in 1802, when he was replaced by his elder brother Newton.

On 2 April 1802, he married Catherine Townley Keatinge, the only daughter of Maurice Keatinge. He took the opportunity of the Peace of Amiens to travel to France, but was detained at Verdun when war broke out again in 1803. While there, he was alleged to have carried on an affair with the wife of another English detainee, which prompted the French authorities to remove him to the fortress of Bitche in February 1805. He was returned to Verdun in May 1806, but his health had suffered badly, and he died suddenly of apoplexy on 31 August 1807. He left no children.

Parliament of Great Britain
Preceded by Benjamin Lethieullier; William Fellowes	Member of Parliament for Andover; 1796–1800; With: Benjamin Lethieullier 1796–1797; Thomas Assheton Smith I 1797–1802	Succeeded by Parliament of the United Kingdom
Parliament of the United Kingdom
Preceded by Parliament of Great Britain	Member of Parliament for Andover; 1801–1802	Succeeded by Thomas Assheton Smith I Hon. Newton Fellowes
