= Coulson Fellowes =

English landowner and politician

Coulson Fellowes (1696–1769) was an English landowner and politician, Member of Parliament for Huntingdonshire from 1741 to 1761.

== Life ==
He was the eldest son of the barrister William Fellowes and his wife Mary Martyn; his maternal grandmother was Susannah Coulson, sister of Thomas Coulson. He matriculated at Christ Church, Oxford in 1716. He was called to the bar at Lincoln's Inn in 1723.

Fellowes was on a Grand Tour in France and Italy from 1723 to 1725. He was at Rome in 1724 with Conyers Middleton, and travelled on towards Venice with Middleton and John Folliot. His father died 15 January 1724, and he succeeded as his main heir. He inherited the manor of Eggesford in Devon. He made a mortgage loan to the Duke of Chandos in 1725.

Coming to own two landed estates, Fellowes resided in Hampstead. Habakkuk commented on his large investments held in the Funds.

In 1737 Fellowes bought Ramsey Abbey, then in the county of Huntingdonshire. Silius Titus had bought it in 1675 from the heirs of Sir Henry Williams, 2nd Baronet; and Fellowes bought it from the family of Titus, who died in 1704.

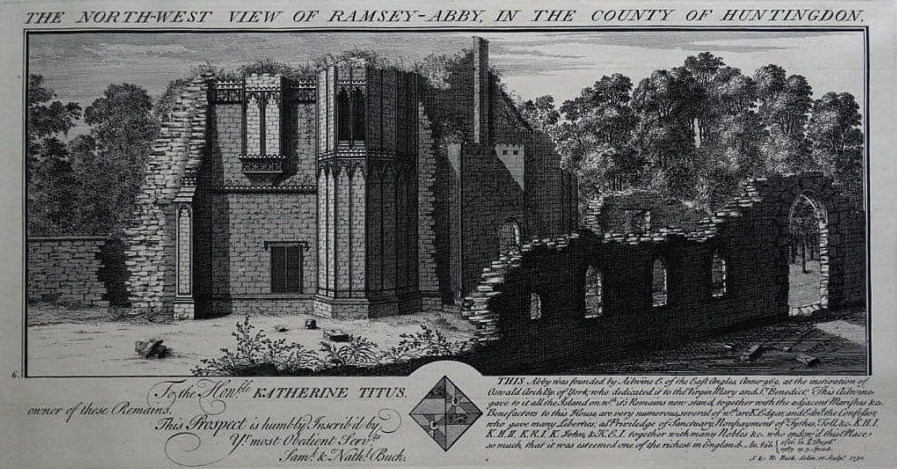
Ramsey Abbey, 1730 engraving

On his death, Fellowes left money to Addenbrookes Hospital.

== In politics ==
Fellowes was elected Member of Parliament for Huntingdonshire in 1741, having support in the two-member constituency from John Montagu, 4th Earl of Sandwich, in the group of followers of the Whig John Russell, 4th Duke of Bedford. He with William Mitchell kept out Charles Clarke, backed by Robert Montagu, 3rd Duke of Manchester. In this time of the decline of Sir Robert Walpole's ascendency, he was classed as an Opposition Whig. He continued to oppose, from 1744, the Broad Bottom ministry in which Sandwich took office. Nonetheless, he retained Sandwich's support. He was returned again at the 1747 general election, with Edward Wortley Montagu. When John Jones published his 1749 book in liturgical reform in the Church of England, Fellowes was in the select group of political figures he thought might take an interest, with Lord Lonsdale, Arthur Onslow, and James West. A character sketch by Jones of Fellowes was published by John Nichols in his Literary Anecdotes.

In 1754 Fellowes was re-elected, with John Proby of Elton Hall, the Montagu backers keeping out with the next generation not yet being of age. Sandwich floated the idea of Proby standing with William Montagu, his brother, but it was dropped when Fellowes demurred. At the 1761 general election, however, George Montagu was elected with Proby, under a local electoral deal, and Fellowes ended his time in parliament.

== Family ==
Conyers married in 1725 Urania Herbert. She was sister to Henry Herbert, and daughter of Francis Herbert of Oakly Park, Member of Parliament for Ludlow. They had two sons and three daughters.

- The elder son was William Fellowes (c.1726–1804), Member of Parliament for Ludlow and Andover. He married in 1768 Lavinia Smyth; she was a sister of Margaret Bingham. William Henry Fellowes (died 1792), their eldest son, was a Member of Parliament.
- Henry Arthur Fellowes, the younger son, inherited the Eggesford estate, and was High Sheriff of Devon in 1775. He left Eggesford to Newton Fellowes, his nephew; who rebuilt Eggesford House on a new site, in "Tudor embattled style", in 1822.

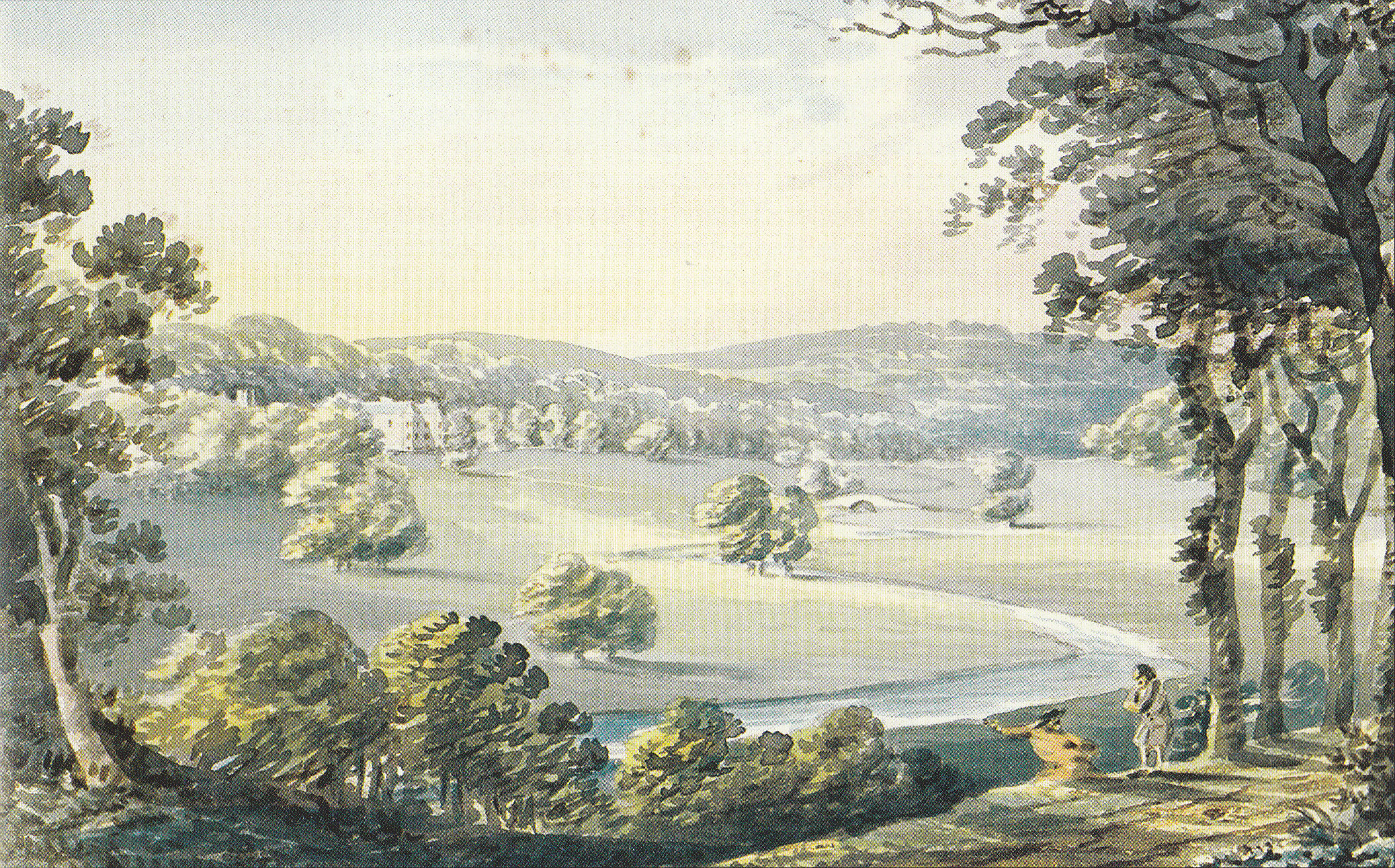
Old Eggesford House, 1797 watercolour by John Swete

- Their daughter Urania married in 1763 John Wallop, later 2nd Earl of Portsmouth.

The other daughters of the marriage were Mary and Dorothea. Dorothea who died in 1817 was confined from 1791 for the rest of her life in a private asylum, Fisher House in Islington under Samuel Foart Simmons, by a family group of her brothers, her sister Urania and Robert Fellowes.

In 1720 Fellowes acted as executor of a will of an unmarried cousin, Elizabeth Pett of Carshalton, who had died that year. She was the daughter of Elizabeth Coulson, sister of Susannah Coulson, who had married, as her second husband, Sir Phineas Pett (died 1694) of the Pett dynasty of shipwrights: she was his third wife. She had previously been married to John Tarleton.

The Norfolk Record Office has an archive of Fellowes family records. A "File of receipts to Edward Fellowes for annuities under will of Sir John Fellowes" shows that his uncle Edward dealt with Coulson Fellowes over the estate of his uncle Sir John Fellowes, 1st Baronet, who died in 1724, and for whom Edward (died 1731) acted as executor, and was principal legatee. Other archival records show that the Carshalton manor house passed from Sir John Fellowes to Edward Fellowes and Coulson Fellowes. Work was done there on the Water Tower around 1721, thought to be by the architect Henry Joynes. "The early C18 double-fold carriage gates (listed grade II) are hung from a pair of gate piers with crowned lions' heads from the Fellowes' coat of arms." The property then passed to Philip Yorke, 1st Earl of Hardwicke.
