= Benjamin Lethieullier =

British politician

Benjamin Lethieullier (1729-1797), was a British politician who sat in the House of Commons between 1768 and 1797.

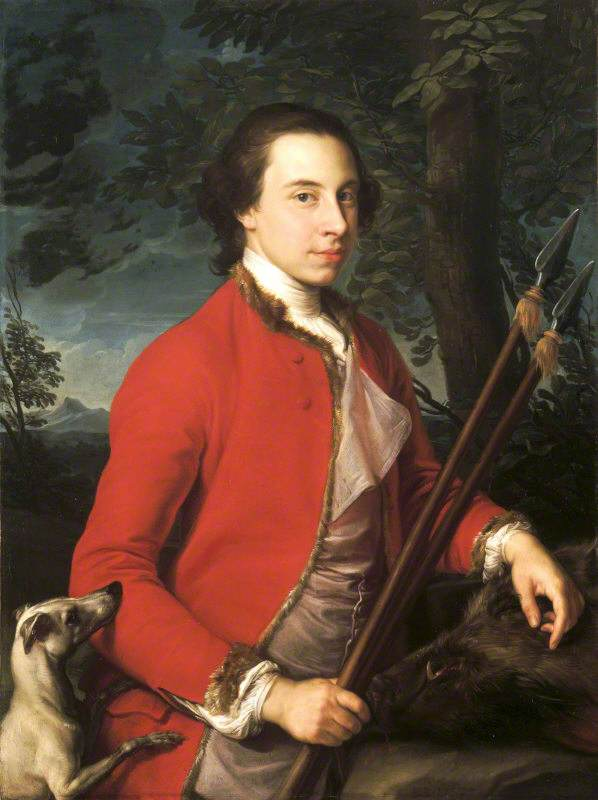
Benjamin Lethieullier in 1752 by Pompeo Batoni

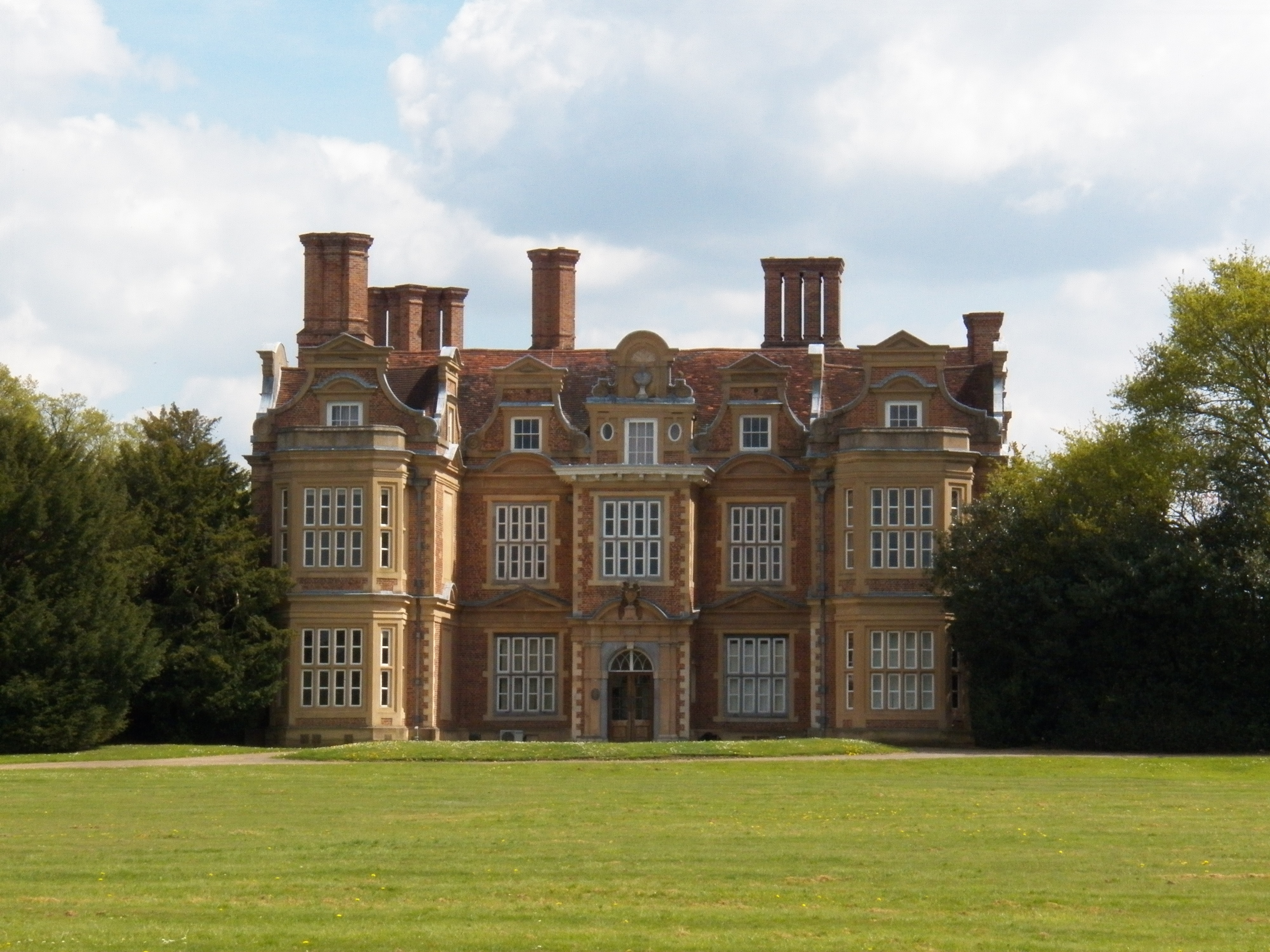
Swakeleys House, Ickenham

Lethieullier was the son of Christopher Lethieullier, director of the Bank of England, and his wife Sarah Lascelles who was daughter of Edward Lascelles, and widow of Joshua Iremonger of Wherwell, Hampshire.

Lethieullier's father died in 1736 and in 1741 his mother Sarah purchased Swakeleys for him. He came of age in 1750 and in the following year sold the estate to the Rector of Ickenham. He became a wealthy man, holding considerable amounts of Bank of England stock. He never had any involvement in the Bank of England although his father and uncle were both directors. Between 1748 and 1753 he undertook the Grand Tour with his brother-in-law Sir Matthew Fetherstonhaugh, 1st Baronet, and his step brother Lascelles Iremonger. They brought back to Uppark an impressive collection of Italian art. Benjamin's sister Sarah Lethieullier (1722–1788), Lady Fetherstonhaugh, also joined the group on their Grand Tour during 1749 and 1751, and was also depicted by Pompeo Batoni (1708-1787).

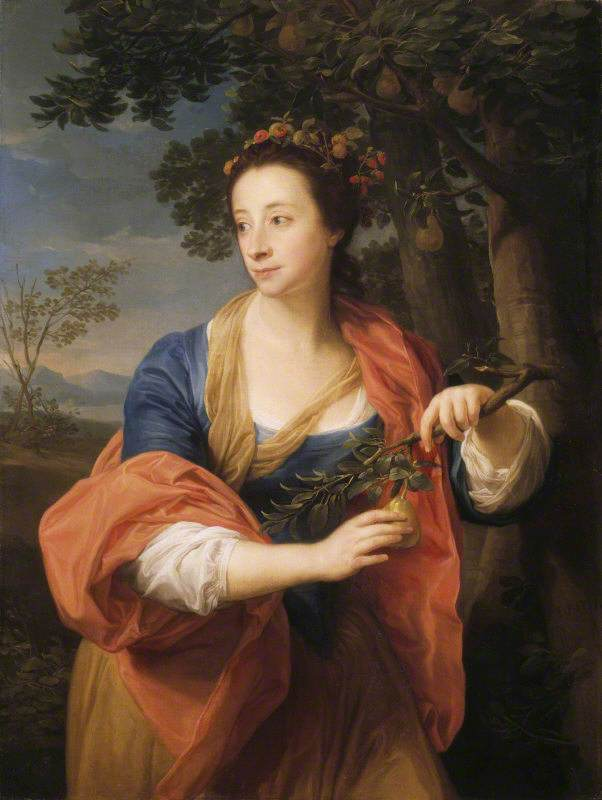
Sarah Lethieullier Lady Fetherstonhaugh by Pompeo Batoni

In 1768 Lethieullier was returned as Member of Parliament for Andover and held the seat for 29 years. In 1784 he was returned both for Andover and Midhurst and chose to sit again for Andover.

Lethieullier is not recorded as speaking in parliament but voted regularly on major issues. He never held any political appointments. He was spoken of with respect but is rarely mentioned in correspondence.

Lethieullier died unmarried on 5 December 1797 .

== Sources ==
- Portrait of Benjamin Lethieullier MP (1728/9-1797), with two Wild Boar Spears by Pompeo Girolamo Batoni at Uppark, National Trust.

Parliament of Great Britain
Preceded by Sir Francis Blake Delaval; Sir John Griffin	Member of Parliament for Andover; 1768–1797; With: Sir John Griffin 1768-1784; William Fellowes 1784-1796; Hon. Coulson Wallop 1796-1797	Succeeded by Thomas Assheton Smith I Hon. Coulson Wallop
Preceded by Sir Sampson Gideon; Hon. Henry Drummond	Member of Parliament for Midhurst; 1784–1784; With: Hon. Henry Drummond	Succeeded by Edward Cotsford; Hon. Henry Drummond
