= Hanover Square, London =

Square in Mayfair, London, England

Coordinates: 51°30′50″N 0°8′39″W

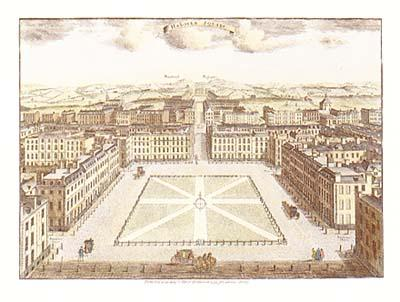
Hanover Square from Stow's London Squares (1750), looking north across Marylebone, which was then not built up, on the horizon

Hanover Square is a green square in Mayfair, Westminster, south west of Oxford Circus where Oxford Street meets Regent Street. Six streets converge on the square which include Harewood Place with links to Oxford Street, Princes Street, Hanover Street, Saint George Street, Brook Street and Tenderden Street, linking to Bond Street and Oxford Street.

== History ==
Development of the land that would become Hanover Square began shortly after the accession of the Elector of Hanover as King George I in 1714. The land was owned by Richard Lumley, 1st Earl of Scarbrough, who was a soldier and statesman best known for his role in the Glorious Revolution. He sold off numerous plots for the building of upmarket town houses and villas.

In honour of the coronation of the new English king, the area was named Hanover Square. This reflected the century-long Whig Ascendancy because its name echoed the staunch and predominant support among the British Establishment towards the Hanoverian succession of 1714, and the Act of Settlement 1701 that permanently codified the exclusion of Catholics from the English throne. "Early Hanover Square was decidedly Whig and most decidedly military", commented architectural historian Sir John Summerson.

Some early residents of Hanover Square included Generals Earl Cadogan, Sir Charles Wills, Stewart, Evans, Lord Carpenter, Hamish Smith and John Pepper, "names conspicuously associated with episodes in Marlborough’s war and the 'Fifteen'."

The parish church of St George's, Hanover Square, is 100 metres south of the square (co-fronting Saint George and Maddox Streets), built on land given by William Steuart. In 1759 James Abercrombie, commander-in-chief of British forces in North America during the French and Indian War, resided in St George Street. Merged or subdivided buildings in many cases, their numbering scheme remains since the early 19th century and is Nos. 1 to 25, consecutively.

In 1831, a statue of William Pitt the Younger was erected at the southern end of the square.

While a few of the 18th-century houses remain largely intact, most houses have been replacements of later periods. It is now predominantly occupied by offices, including the London office of Vogue.

In the 2010s, the north west corner of the square was removed and rebuilt as part of the Crossrail project. A new Bond Street entrance for the Elizabeth line was built, with commercial office space in a new building above.

== Notable residents ==
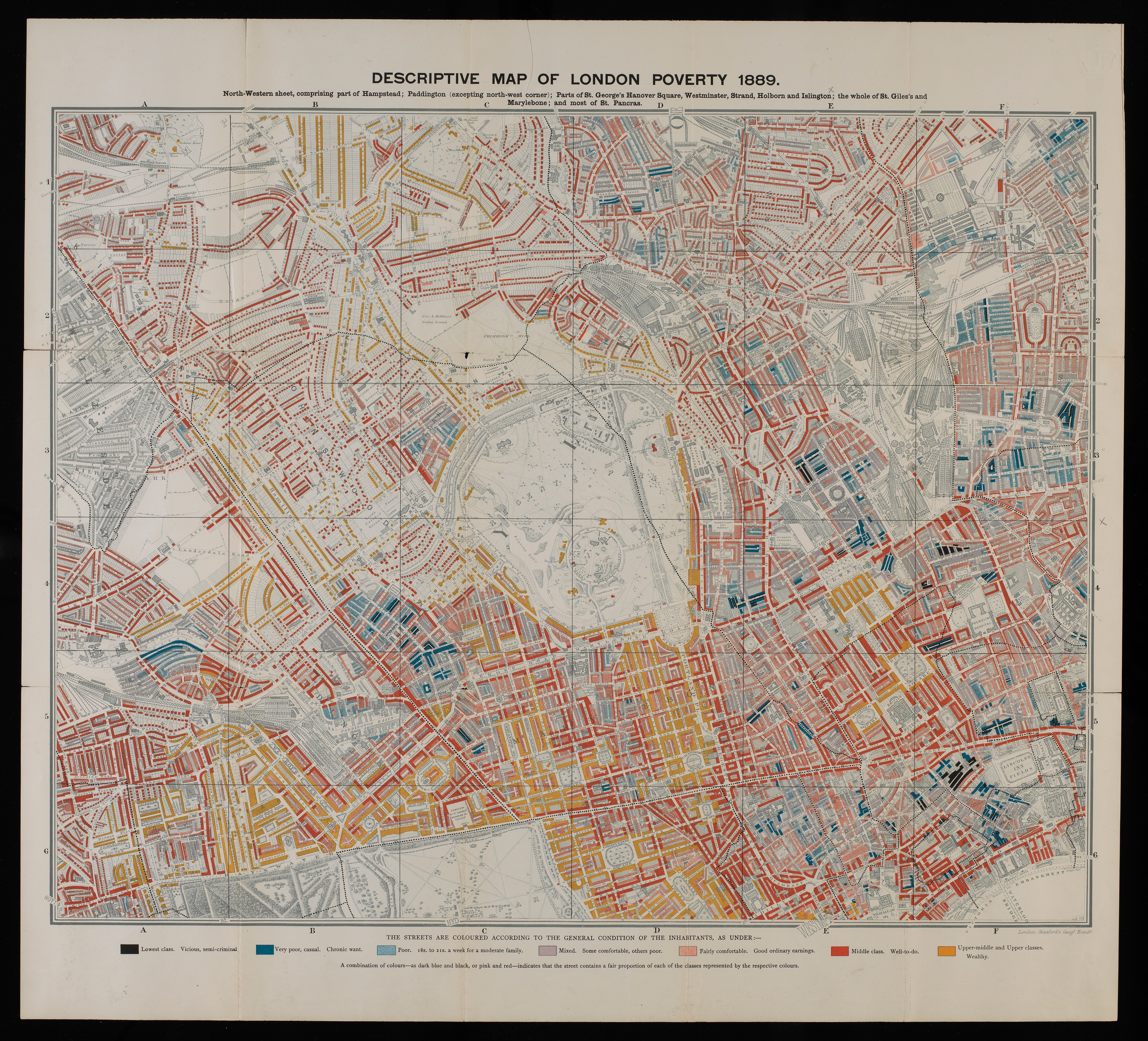
Booth's Poverty Map, 1889, identifies gold (top) income for Hanover Square and wealthy incomes surrounding; it finds nearest true poverty in Soho a few blocks east; the height of ground is given in feet.

This was among the prestigious streets of the socialite elite of the capital in the 19th century, and increasingly national institutions and corporate headquarters. These included:

- The Hall Woodhouse family, prominent surgeons from the 1870s to 1910s – as to No. 1
- John Wallop, 3rd Earl of Portsmouth, and family in 1823 – as to No. 2
- Royal Agricultural Society in the 1880s – as to No. 12
- Ibbs and Tillett event promotion – as to No. 19
- Rt Rev John Egerton, d. 1787, Bishop of Durham and his wife, daughter of local magnate the Earl of Portland – as to No. 23

== Gallery ==
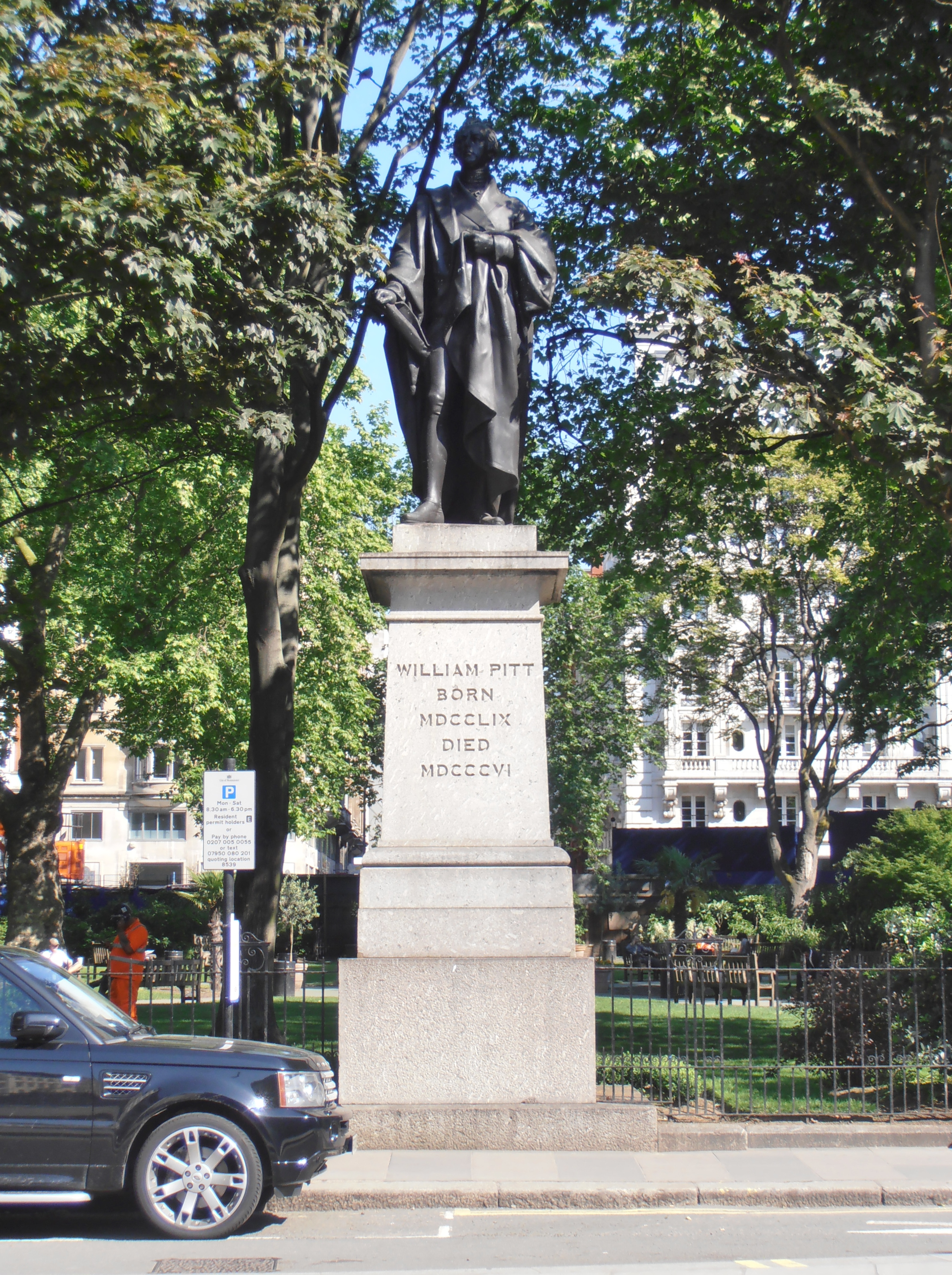
Statue of William Pitt the Younger at the south side of Hanover Square

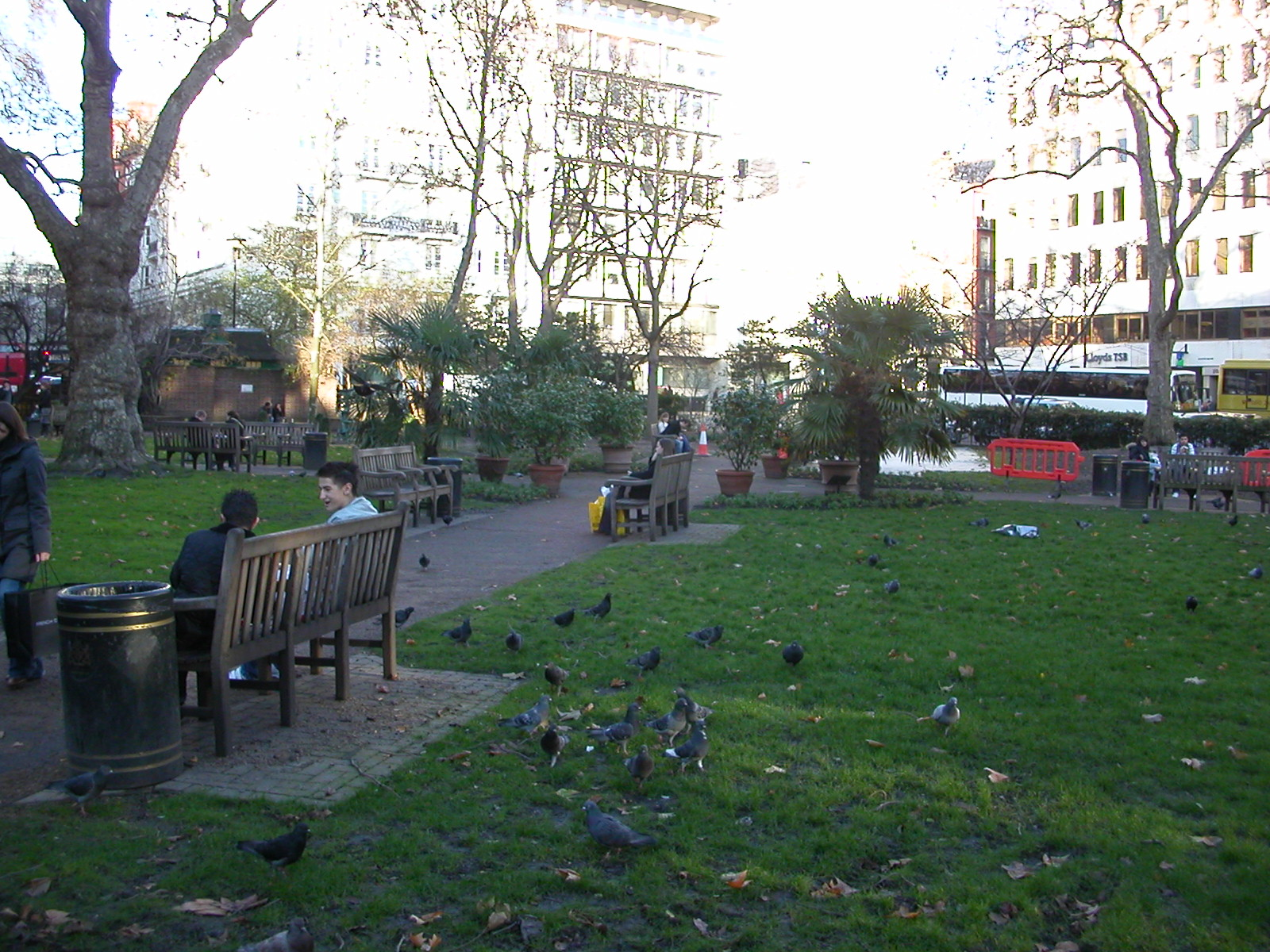
View to the northeast in Hanover Square

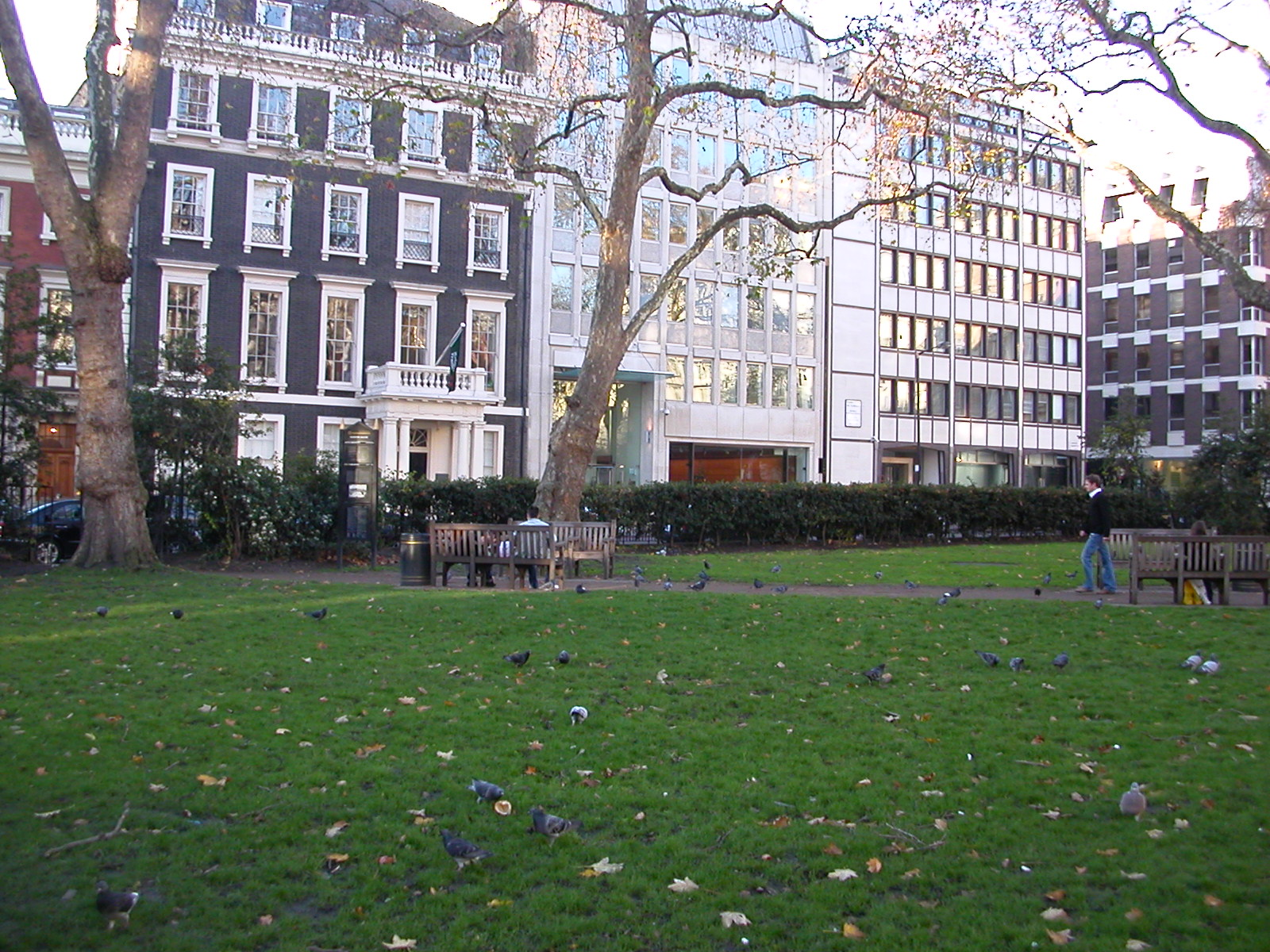
View to the northwest
