= Isaac Newton Wallop, 5th Earl of Portsmouth =

British Peer (1825–1891)

The Right Honourable The Earl of Portsmouth DL JP
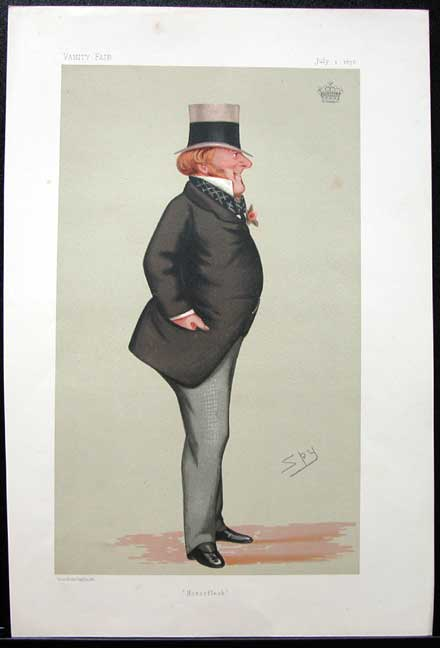
- "Horseflesh", the 5th Earl of Portsmouth, caricature by Spy in Vanity Fair, 1 July 1876.
- Tenure: 9 January 1854 – 4 October 1891
- Predecessor: Newton Fellowes, 4th Earl of Portsmouth
- Successor: Newton Wallop, 6th Earl of Portsmouth
- Born: Isaac Newton Fellowes; 11 January 1825
- Died: 4 October 1891 (aged 66)
- Residence: Farleigh Wallop; Eggesford
- Spouse: Lady Eveline Herbert (m. 1855)
- Issue: Lady Rosamond Christie; Lady Eveline Gurdon; Lady Catherine Milnes Gaskell; Dorothea, Lady Rycroft; Lady Gwendolen Watney; Lady Henrietta Evans; Newton Wallop, 6th Earl of Portsmouth; John Wallop, 7th Earl of Portsmouth; Oliver Wallop, 8th Earl of Portsmouth; Hon. Robert Wallop; Hon. Arthur Wallop; Hon. Frederick Wallop
- Parents: Newton Fellowes, 4th Earl of Portsmouth; Lady Catharine Fortescue

Isaac Newton Wallop, 5th Earl of Portsmouth DL JP(11 January 1825 – 4 October 1891) was a British Peer and the son of Newton Fellowes, 4th Earl of Portsmouth and Lady Catharine Fortescue.

== Early life ==
Portsmouth was born as Isaac Newton Fellowes, but later resumed the family surname and arms of Wallop without Royal Licence when he succeeded to the peerage in 1854. He was the son of Newton Fellowes, 4th Earl of Portsmouth and Lady Catharine Fortescue, daughter of Hugh Fortescue, 1st Earl Fortescue.

He was educated at Rugby School and matriculated at Trinity College, Cambridge, where he received a Master of Arts degree.

== Newton Papers ==
In 1872 Lord Portsmouth donated to his alma mater, Trinity College, Cambridge, a vast collection of papers by Sir Isaac Newton which had descended through Newton's great-niece Catherine Conduitt, daughter of John Conduitt and Catherine Barton, into the Wallop family by her marriage to John Wallop, Viscount Lymington.

A committee chaired by John Couch Adams and Sir George Stokes was appointed by the University to review the papers. Adams and Stokes selected only Newton's scientific papers, not wanting to blemish his reputation as an enlightened intellectual and scientist. After spending sixteen years cataloging Newton's papers, Cambridge University kept a small number and returned the rest to the Earl of Portsmouth.

Other 'Portsmouth Papers' of Newton were auctioned in 1936 by the 9th Earl.

== Marriage and issue ==
On 15 February 1855, Lord Portsmouth married Lady Eveline Alicia Juliana Herbert (21 December 1834 – 1 October 1906), daughter of Henry John George Herbert, 3rd Earl of Carnarvon, by his wife, Henrietta Anna Howard, daughter of Lord Henry Thomas Howard-Molyneux-Howard (yr. brother of Bernard Howard, 12th Duke of Norfolk). They had twelve children:

- Lady Rosamond Alicia Wallop (d. 19 November 1935); married Augustus Langham Christie in 1882 and had issue.
- Lady Eveline Camilla Wallop (d. 13 September 1894); married William Brampton Gurdon MP in 1887; died without issue
- Lady Catherine Henrietta Wallop (d. 21 August 1935); married Charles Milnes Gaskell in 1876 and had issue.
- Lady Dorothea Hester Bluett Wallop (d. 29 December 1906); married Sir Richard Rycroft, 5th Bt., in 1886 and had issue.
- Lady Gwendolen Margaret Wallop (d. 14 February 1943); married Vernon James Watney in 1891; had issue, grandmother of Charles Lyell, 2nd Baron Lyell.
- Lady Henrietta Anna Wallop (d. 8 February 1932); married John Carbery Evans in 1890; died without issue.
- Newton Wallop, 6th Earl of Portsmouth (19 January 1856 – 4 December 1917); married Beatrice Mary Pease on 17 February 1885; died without issue
- John Fellowes Wallop, 7th Earl of Portsmouth (27 December 1859 – 7 September 1925); died unmarried.
- Oliver Henry Wallop, 8th Earl of Portsmouth (13 January 1861 – 10 February 1943); married Marguerite Walker in 1897 and had issue:
  - Gerard Vernon Wallop, 9th Earl of Portsmouth
  - Hon. Oliver Malcolm Wallop; father of Malcolm Wallop
- Hon. Robert Gerard Valoynes Wallop JP (6 July 1864 – 22 August 1940)
- Rev. Hon. Arthur George Edward Wallop BA (12 October 1867 – 22 December 1898)
- Hon. Frederick Henry Arthur Wallop BA (16 February 1870 – 9 August 1953)

== Honours ==
Lord Portsmouth declined the elevation to a Marquessate and the offer to become a Knight of the Garter from Prime Minister William Ewart Gladstone, thinking them 'beyond his merits'.

== Death ==
He died on 4 October 1891 aged 66 and was succeeded in the Earldom by his son, Newton Wallop, 6th Earl of Portsmouth.

== Notes ==
Peerage of Great Britain
Preceded by Newton Fellowes	Earl of Portsmouth; 1854–1891	Succeeded by Newton Wallop
