= Eggesford =

Village in Devon, England

- Village
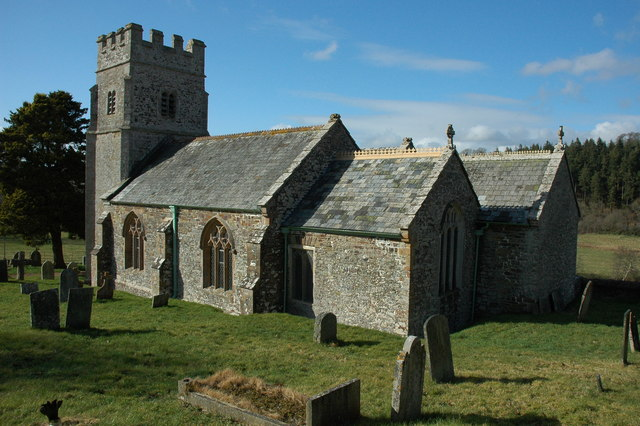
- All Saints Church, Eggesford, viewed from the south-east

- Location within Devon Location within the United Kingdom
- Coordinates: 50°53′08″N 3°52′23″W
- Country: England
- County: Devon
- District: Mid Devon
- Time zone: UTC+0:00 (GST)

Eggesford (/ˈɛɡɪsfərd/) is a parish in mid-Devon, without its own substantial village. It is served by Eggesford railway station on the Exeter to Barnstaple railway line, also known as the Tarka Line.

== Descent of the Manor ==
=== de Reigny ===
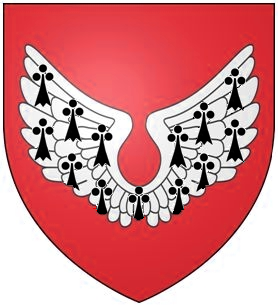
Arms of Reigny of Eggesford: Gules, a pair of wings conjoined ermine, as engraved on a bell in the tower of Eggesford Church

The manor of Eggesford is not recorded in the Domesday Book of 1086. In 1233 it was held by Sir John de Reigny, whose family, nearly all the male heirs of which were called John or Richard, remained in possession for many generations. In the 15th century Ibota, the widow of John Reigny, built an almshouse within the parish, which was valued in 1547 at £4 10s 6d per annum. No trace of the building remains and its location is unknown.

=== Copleston ===
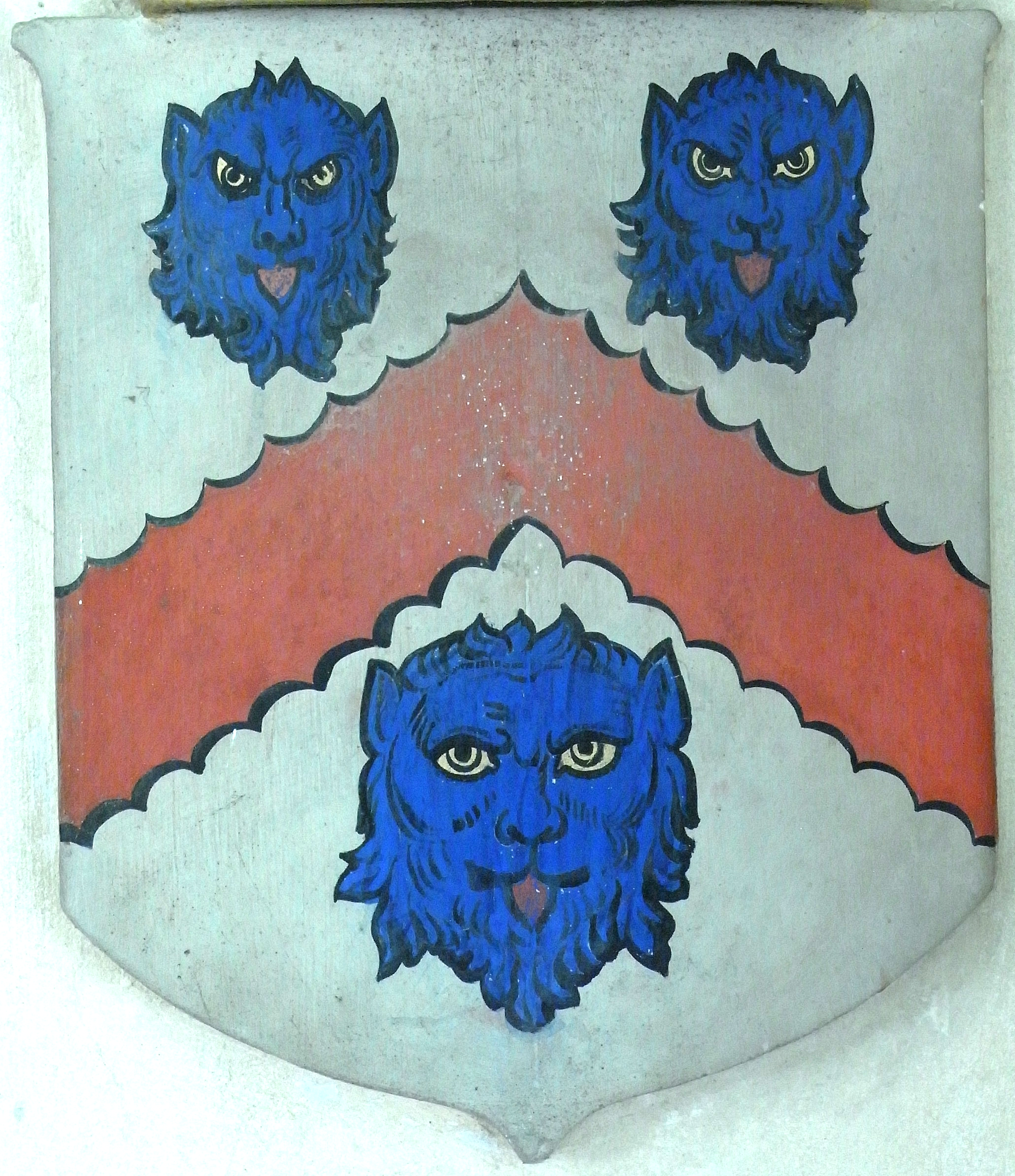
Arms of Copleston of Eggesford: Argent, a chevron engrailed gules between three lion's faces azure. From monument to Edward Chichester, 1st Viscount Chichester (1568–1648) and his wife Anne Copleston (1588–1616), Eggesford Church

In the 16th century the male line of Reigny died out, and Anne Reigny (daughter and sole-heiress of Richard Reigny) brought the manor to the family of her husband, Charles Copleston of Bicton. Their son was John I Copleston (died 1586), who is recorded as patron of the church in 1571. As a mural tablet in Eggesford Church records, his son John II Copleston (died 1606), who witnessed a land settlement at Winkleigh in 1589, married Dorothy Beeston (died 1601), the daughter of Sir George Beeston (c. 1520 – 1601) of Beeston House near Bunbury, Crewe, Cheshire, who acquired Beeston Castle from the Crown shortly before his death. He was a naval captain who commanded the Dreadnought against the Spanish Armada in 1588, and was knighted at sea on board the Ark Royal by Lord Howard of Effingham the Lord High Admiral. He served as MP for Cheshire in 1589. His wife, and Dorothy's mother, was Alice Davenport (died 1591), daughter of Thomas Davenport Esq., of Henbury. Sir George's effigy and elaborate monument exists against the north wall of the sanctuary in St Boniface's Church, Bunbury. The tablet in Eggesford Church is inscribed as follows:

"Here lyeth buried ye bodies of John Copleston Esq., & Dorothie his wife daughter to Sr. George Biston of Biston Castel in Chelshere, knight. They had issue Anne their sole daught. & heire who is now maryed to Edwarde Chichester Esq., one of ye sonnes of Sr. John Chichester of Rawleigh, knight, in whose memory the said Edwarde Chichester their son in law hath erected this monument in ye yere 1614. She departed ye 22 July in ye yere 1601 he departed ye 11 of ... in ye yere 1606, living together 30 yeres in much peace w.th God & lovinge societie e.ch w.th other".

=== Chichester ===
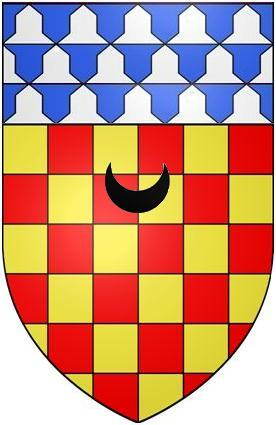
Arms of Chichester of Eggesford: Chequy or and gules, a chief vair a crescent sable for difference. The crescent is a cadency mark of a second son

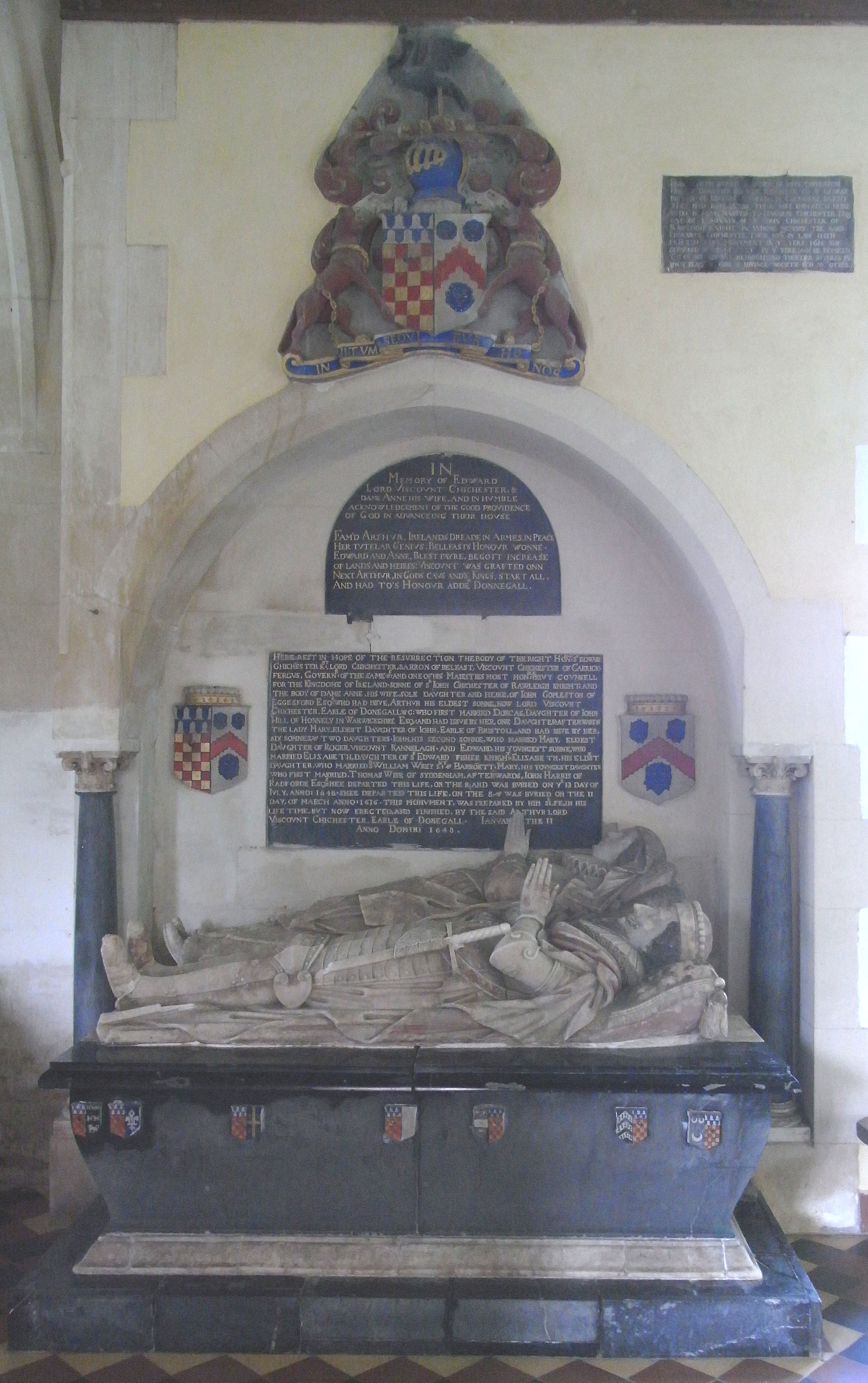
Monument to Edward Chichester, 1st Viscount Chichester (1568–1648) of Carickfergus & his wife Anne Copleston (1588–1616), Eggesford Church, north wall of north aisle chapel

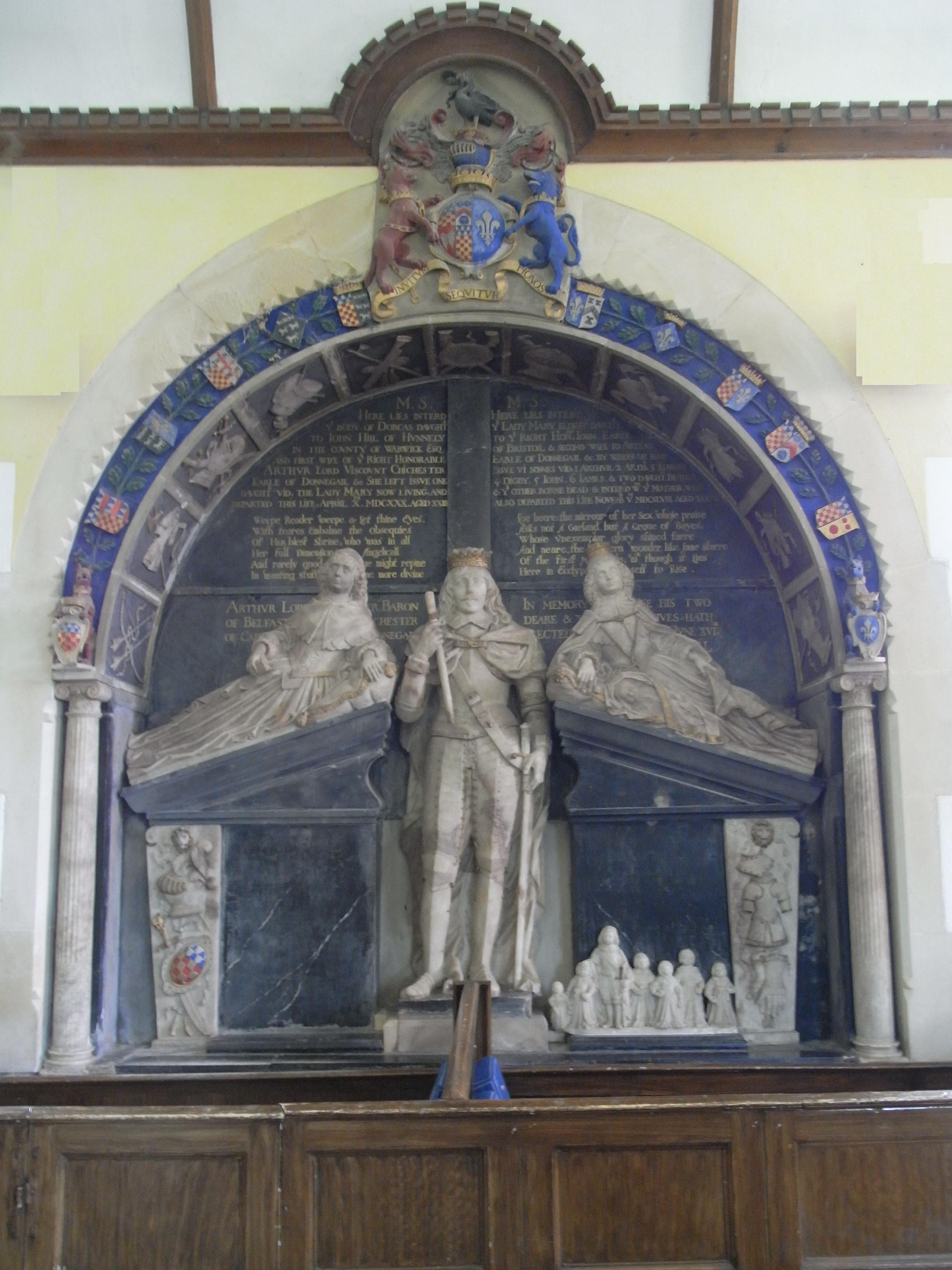
Monument to two first wives of Arthur Chichester, 1st Earl of Donegall (1606-1674/5), Eggesford Church, Devon, south wall of nave

Anne Copleston (1588–1616), the heiress of Eggesford, married in 1605 Edward Chichester (1568–1648), later created Baron Chichester of Belfast and Viscount Chichester of Carickfergus. He was the second son of Sir John Chichester (died 1569), of Raleigh, in the parish of Pilton, about 3/4 mile NE of the centre of Barnstaple, Devon, by his wife Gertrude Courtenay (1521–1566), a daughter (by his 2nd marriage) of Sir William III Courtenay (1477–1535) "The Great", of Powderham, MP for Devon 1529, Sheriff of Devon 1522, 1525-6, 1533-4 and Esquire of the Body to King Henry VIII, a distant cousin of the Earl of Devon. He was thus the younger brother of Arthur Chichester, Baron Chichester (1563-1624/5). Anne Copleston died in 1616 aged only 28, having produced at least three sons to continue the Chichester line. Edward married secondly Mary Denham, which marriage is recorded by a date-stone now set in the wall of Eggesford Barton inscribed "E.C.M. 1626". This may be the date on which Edward Chichester completed his rebuilding of the former mediaeval Eggesford House, which is evidenced by William Pole (died 1635) in his "Description of Devon" thus: "Edward Vi.cont Chichester of Cairfus which hath builded a fayre howse dwelleth nowe at Eggesford". Tristram Risdon's 1620 "Survey of Devonshire" furthermore records regarding Eggesford that Edward Lord Chichester "hath made a dainty dwelling thereof". During the Civil War Lord Chichester allowed this house to become a garrison for royalist troops, under the command of Lord Goring, whose HQ was at Tiverton. It was stormed on 18 December 1645 by the Roundhead Colonel John Okey with a regiment of Dragoons, as part of the final push by the parliamentary troops northwards from Exeter to their final victory at the Battle of Torrington in February 1646. About twelve prisoners were captured and taken back top Okey's base at Fulford House near Dunsford. No trace of this Chichester house remains but it is believed to have stood on a level site some 50 yards to the NW of the parish church, and was later rebuilt on the same site in 1718 by William Fellowes, whose building was demolished in 1824, leaving only a level area in the large field which exists there today. Edward and Anne's eldest son and heir was Arthur Chichester, 1st Earl of Donegall (1606–1674/5), who erected a very elaborate alabaster monument to his first two wives in Eggesford Church. Although he produced six sons by his second wife Mary Digby (1612–1648), daughter of John Digby, 1st Earl of Bristol, it was his daughter Mary by his first wife Dorcas Hill (died 1630), a daughter of John Hill of Honiley, Warwickshire, who inherited Eggesford. This seemingly arose through the terms of a marriage settlement, not preserved in the records, in which John Hill insisted the manor should descend to the children, male or female, of his daughter and son-in-law. Such terms in marriage settlements were not unusual. Thus were the sons of the Earl excluded from this part of the Chichester lands.

=== St Ledger ===
Arms of St Ledger, Viscounts Doneraile: Azure fretty argent, a chief or

Lady Mary Chichester married in 1655 as his first wife John St Ledger (died 1696) of Doneraile, County Cork, Ireland. He was the son of Sir William St Ledger (died 1642), Lord President of Munster in 1627, MP for County Cork in 1639 and Privy Counsellor, by his wife Gertrude de Vries. Their eldest son was Arthur St Ledger, 1st Viscount Doneraile, MP for Doneraile 1692-3, Privy Counsellor and raised to the Irish peerage in 1703. He married in 1690 Elizabeth Hayes, daughter of John Hayes and had issue. He appears to have had little interest in his Devon manor of Eggesford and sold it in 1718 to William Fellowes.

=== Fellowes ===
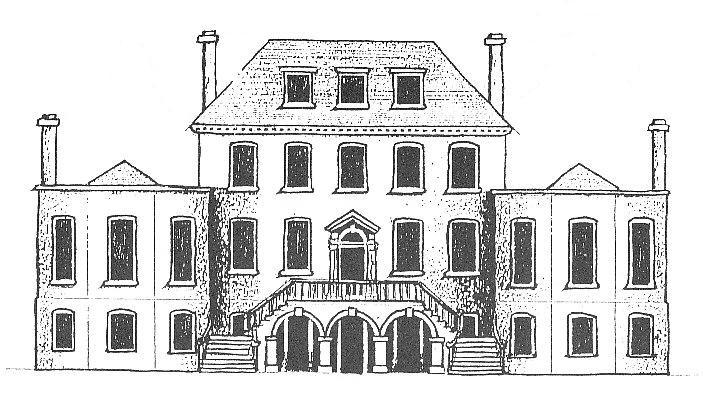
The red-brick Palladian Eggesford House as built in 1718 by William Fellowes (died 1724), north front facing river, shown before the alterations of 1792 which extended the wings upwards to form a uniform roof-line. Eggesford Church would stand some 20 yards to the SE of the eastern (left) end of the house (i.e. to the left, slightly set-back)

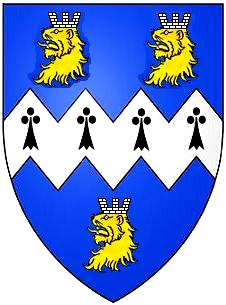
Arms of Fellowes of Eggesford: Azure, a fesse indented ermine between three lion's heads erased or murally crowned argent

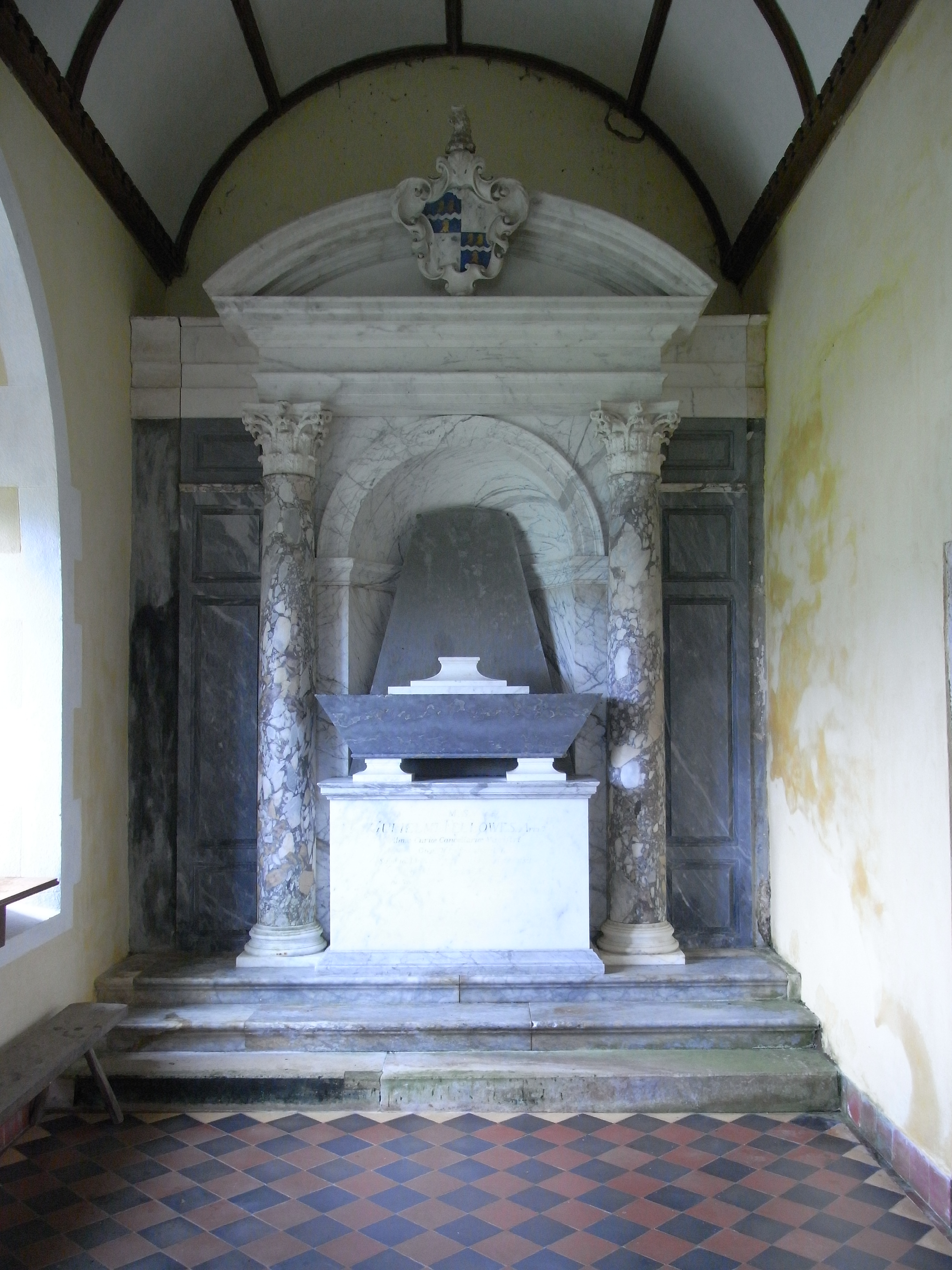
Monument to William Fellowes, Esq., (died 1723/4), Eggesford Church, Devon, east wall of north aisle

William Fellowes (1660–1724) purchased the manor of Eggesford in 1718 and immediately rebuilt the Chichester house of c. 1620 in early Palladian style, using red bricks. The following deeds are held by Norfolk Record Office:

"Deeds re £30,000 for purchase of estate for William Fellowes, his son-in-law, left by will of Joseph Martyn 1715; manors of Eggesford, Chawley, Borriston, Cheldon, Cudlip, East Warlington, Witheridge, Drayton; hundred of Witheridge; capital messuage called Eggesford, and farm and advowson, Devon, and manor of Mountsey and estates, Somerset, Lord Doneralle to William Fellowes 1718".

William Fellowes died on 19 January 1723 and was buried at Eggesford. His heir erected a very impressive neo-classical monument to his memory, which necessitated an eastward expansion of the north aisle of the church, and the creation of an extra window for lighting. The monument fills the entire eastern wall, and seems intended to have held an urn, now missing. He clearly became very fond of his new manor of Eggesford, as the Latin inscription on his monument makes clear:

"M(emoriae) S(acrum) Gulielmi Fellowes Arm(ige)ri almae curiae cancellariae Magistri quo officio tenente summa legis et aequitatis cura decessit 19.mo (undevicensimo) Jan(uar)ii 1723 aeta(tis) 64. Mariam Josephi Martyn de London mercatoris viri integritate insignis filiam et haeredem duxit; liberos quinqe ex ea genitos viz (videlicet) tres filios et duas filias reliquit. Familiam diu hic permanere cupiens ossa sua hoc in loco deponi voluit".

Which may be translated into English as:

"Sacred to the memory of William Fellowes, Esquire, Master of the Court of Chancery in holding which office in the highest care of law and equity he departed on the 19th of January 1723 of his age 64. He married Mary the daughter and heir of Joseph Martyn of London, merchant, a man outstanding in integrity; he left five children born from her namely three sons and two daughters. Desiring his family long to remain here he wished his bones to be deposited in this place".

The monument is said to have been made in Italy and originally included four kneeling figures at the base. At the top in a heraldic escutcheon are the arms of Fellowes quartered with the arms of Martyn, his wife's family, Argent, a pair of dolphins hauriant proper.

William Fellowes two sons, the younger being William Fellowes of Shotesham Park, and the elder Coulson Fellowes (1696–1769) who in 1725 married Urania Herbert, daughter of Francis Herbert of Oakly Park, Shropshire and sister of Henry Herbert, 1st Earl of Powis (1703–1772). The marriage settlement dated 1725 required him to transfer to trustees in tail male the following lands:

"Manors of Eggesford, Chawley also Chawleigh, Borrington also Burrington, Cheldon Cudlip East Worlington Witherigges also Witheridge and Drayford, the Hundred of Witherigges, the capital messuage called Eggesford in Eggesford parish and Chawley, other lands in parish of Eggesford, Wembworthy, Chawley, Borrington, Winkley Rings Ash Dowland Rose Ash Crediton, South Tawton, Great Torrington, Cholmley Cheldon Cudlip EastWorlington Witheridges and Drayford, parts of the Manor, borough, hundred, rights and lands of Northtawton, the Manor, borough, hundred, rights and lands of Brampton (sic, Bampton), the Manor of Hollacomb Parramore in p. of Wynkley, lands in Winkley and Winkley Town, messuages in Goldsmith Street and Keylane by Key Gate, Exeter, parts of messuages in Moreton Hamstead and Chagford and the advowsons of the churches of Eggesford, Chawley, Cheldon, and East Worlington, Devon, and the Manor of Mountsey also Mounyseaux and lands in Mounseaux and Dullverton, Somerset".

In 1737 Coulson acquired Ramsey Abbey and Abbots Ripton near Huntingdon in Cambridgeshire and was MP for Huntingdonshire from 1741 to 1761. When in London he lived at St James's and at Hampstead, as mentioned in his will. He had two sons and three daughters. In his will dated 1766, two years before his son William's marriage, he bequeathed his lands in Devon, Somerset, Huntingdonshire and Cambridgeshire to his second son Henry, should William die childless. In the event, Henry by the time of his death in 1792 had obtained the manor of Eggesford from his elder brother.

=== Wallop/Fellowes ===
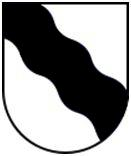
Arms of Wallop, Earls of Portsmouth: Argent, a bend wavy sable

By his will Henry Fellowes appointed as his heir, on condition he should adopt the name and arms of Fellowes, his nephew Newton Wallop (1772–1854), his sister's second son. Newton's elder brother John Wallop (1767–1853) was destined to become the 3rd Earl of Portsmouth and to inherit the extensive family estates in Hampshire; he was also known to have been insane even from childhood. Henry Fellowes clearly did not wish the Eggesford estate to be merged with the Portsmouth estates, nor for the Fellowes name and arms to be lost. Newton Wallop thus appeared an ideal heir, having no family inheritance of his own. The inheritance was not without legal dispute, as the following record in Cambridgeshire County Record Office, Huntingdon reveals:

"Papers relating to the Case in Chancery brought by Hon. Newton Wallop and Hon. Coulson Wallop, infants, represented by John, Earl of Portsmouth, their father and next friend, and Robert Fellowes of Shottisham, Norfolk, Esq., devisees named in the last Will of Henry Arthur Fellowes, late of Eggesford, Devon, and Hill Street nr. Berkeley Square, Middlesex, Esq., deceased, against William Fellowes his brother and heir at law. The dispute arises over the will of the late H.A.Fellowes. The question is whether, because H.A.Fellowes was duped into leaving his lands in Devon, Somerset, Essex and Middlesex and some money to his supposed, but actually non-existent, children by Mrs Martha Brown, the rest of the will is valid. If the rest is valid, his nephew, Newton Wallop, will inherit: if not valid, his brother William Fellowes, will inherit as heir at law".

William Fellowes had alleged that his sister Mary had influenced both his father and his brother to make wills which were not in his favour. The will was deemed valid, and the unfortunate Mrs Brown was imprisoned in the Fleet, from where she made a plea for financial assistance to fight the case and secure her legacy and annuity. Affidavits had been lodged in court testifying that she was already married, presumably to Mr Brown, and also to her bad character and the fact that she had not been pregnant over the past 12 or so years. Newton Wallop was deemed the legal heir under the will and thus inherited Eggesford and by royal licence in 1794 duly adopted for himself and his issue the name and arms of Fellowes. Fellowes' second wife Lady Catharine Fortescue, a daughter of Hugh Fortescue, 1st Earl Fortescue (1753–1841) of Castle Hill, Filleigh appears to have been the driving force behind the demolition of the old Eggesford House located immediately to the west of the parish church, and the building of the new Eggesford House, about a mile further east on the brow of a hill, the site of Heywood House in the parish of Wembworthy, ancient seat of the Speke family, which was demolished as part of the scheme. Catharine had at first planned merely to enlarge and remodel the old house, and had drawings prepared by her father's architect Thomas Lee (died 1834) of Barnstaple.

== Old Eggesford House, Eggesford ==
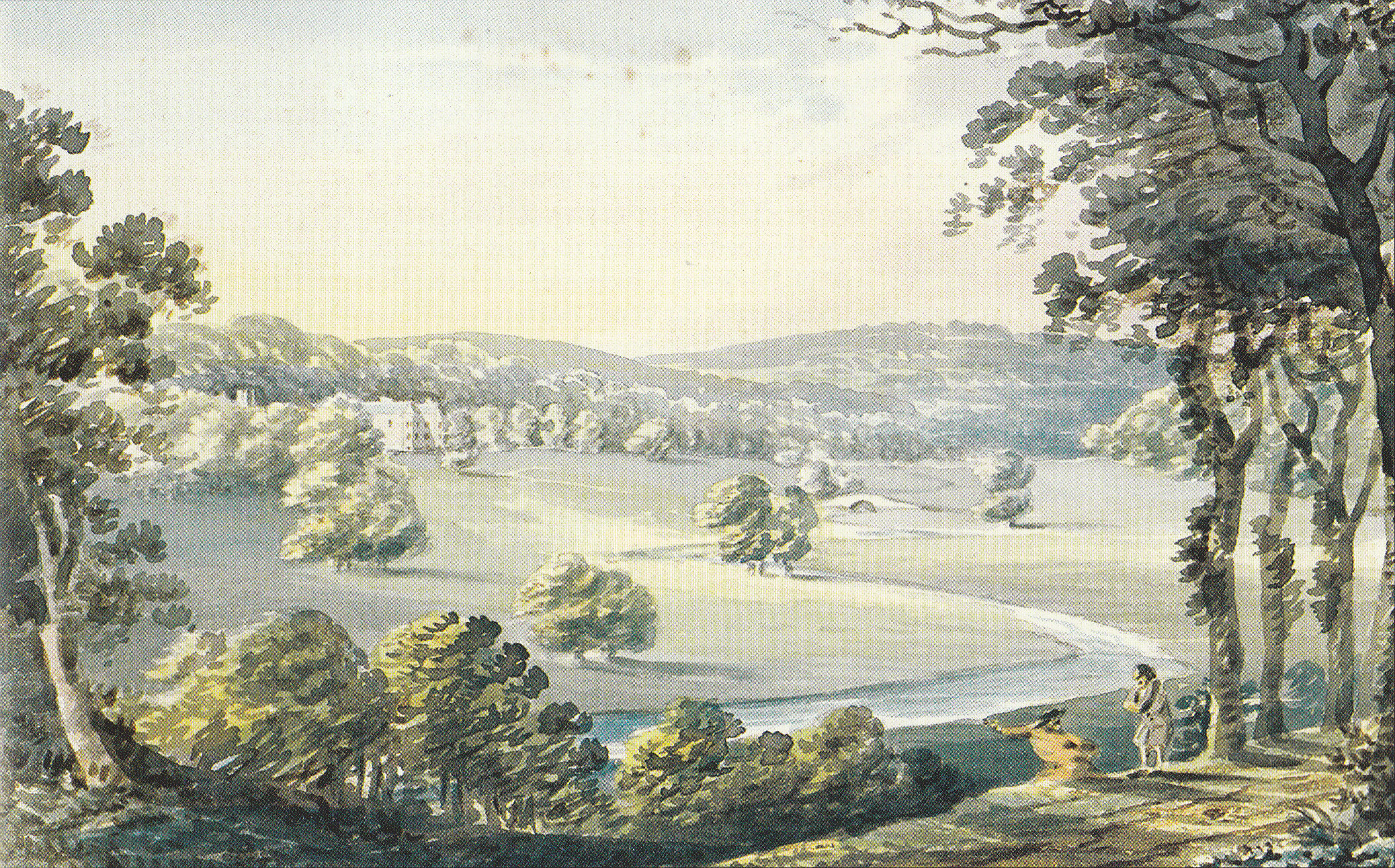
"North East View of Eggesford" dated 1797, watercolour by Rev. John Swete. Devon Record Office ref: 564M/F11/99. This is Old Eggesford House in Eggesford parish, demolished c. 1830

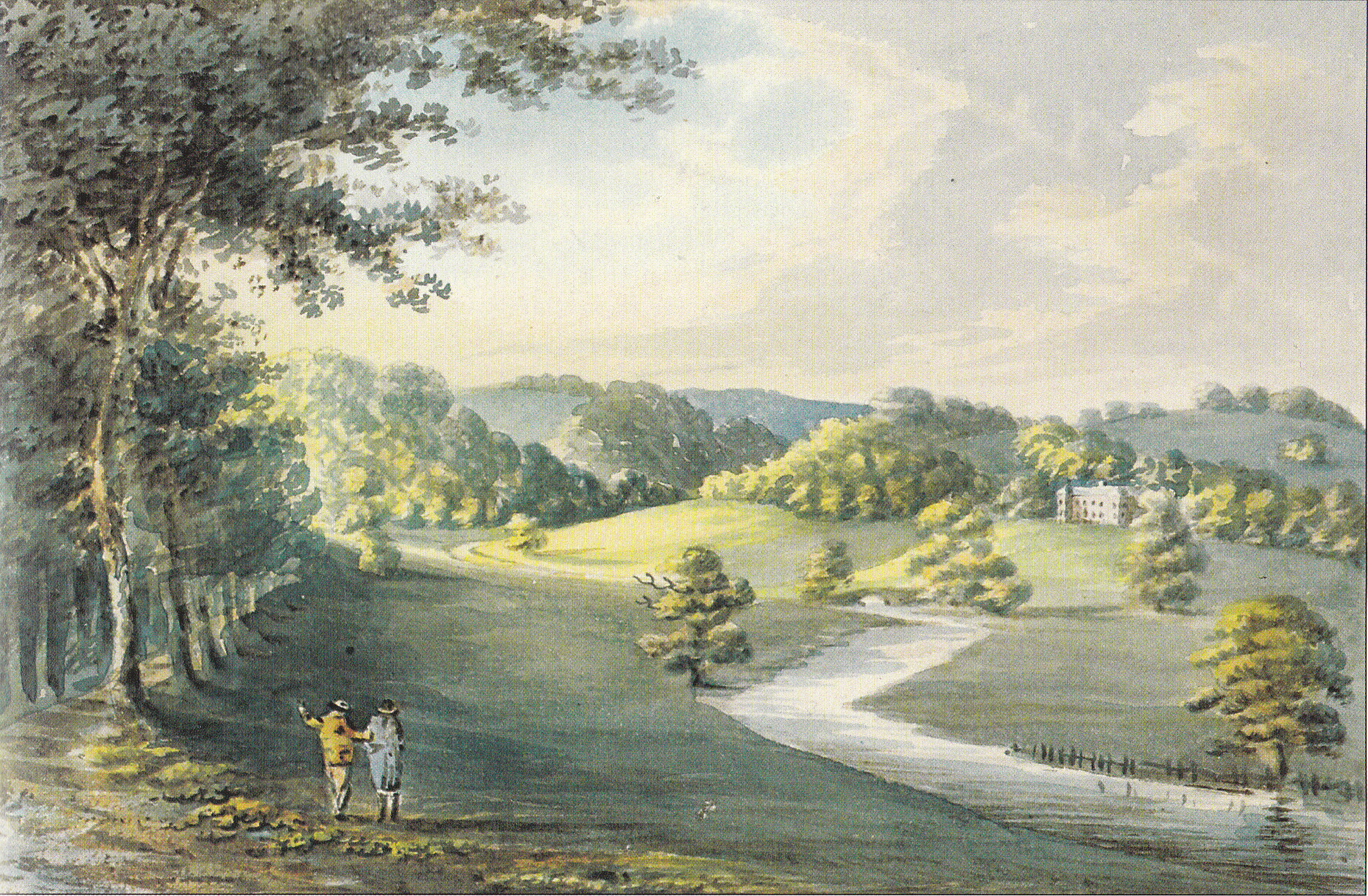
"Eggesford, Seat of Hon. Newton Fellowes", viewed from NW, watercolour by Rev. John Swete dated 1797. Devon Record Office 564M/F11/111

The Devon topographer Rev. John Swete visited Eggesford House in 1797 and wrote in his journal as follows:

"I went to reconnoitre the beauties of Eggesford, the seat of the Hon.ble Mr Fellowes, I was first conducted to a range of cottages which the maternal uncle of the present possessor had erected for some poor families: they consisted of three double houses with a narrow alley between each and a long strip of garden. These were severally let for £2 pr. an. to six families of the parish and though they were cheap in the rent I could not allow that for cottages the situation, which was on the top of a high hill, was judiciously chosen, nor the plan an appropriate one". From that criticism followed another, this time of the mansion house itself, the position of which he describes "On the left stood the house and almost contiguous to it behind was seen the top of the church tower". This is useful evidence in locating the old house next to the church. He praises the setting, but remarks "The detraction, which appeared glaringin my eye, was the red colour: brick houses are always offensive when situate among fields and woods, they should be ever in populous cities pent; the picturesque tint is a sober grey, or a soften'd ruddy brown; it should be in short of, or like, the Portland stone, a modest tint of this cast, when beheld in the bosom of weoods, or relieved by large spreading trees, had the finest possible effect, and was Eggesford mine I would either stucco it or case it with the patent tile, imitative of the Portland hue"...

== New Eggesford House, Wembworthy ==
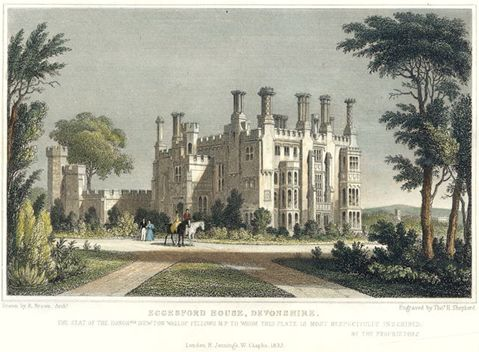
"Eggesford House, Devonshire, the seat of the Honourable Newton Wallop Fellows (sic) MP to whom this plate is most respectfully inscribed by the proprietors, London, R Jennings W. Chaplin, 1833". This is the new Eggesford House, built c. 1830 in the adjacent Wembworthy parish, whilst the old Eggesford House was situated next to Eggesford Church in Eggesford parish

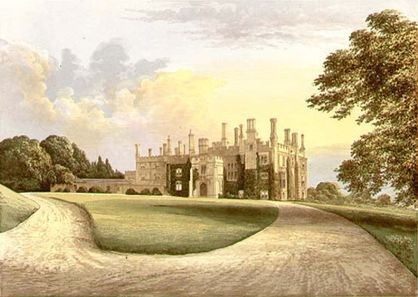
Eggesford House, near Wembworthy, Devon. Chromolithograph published in "A Series of Picturesque Views of Seats Of Noblemen and Gentlemen of Great Britain And Ireland", 1870/80, edited by Rev. Francis Orpen Morris, B.A., Volume 6, 11" x 8"

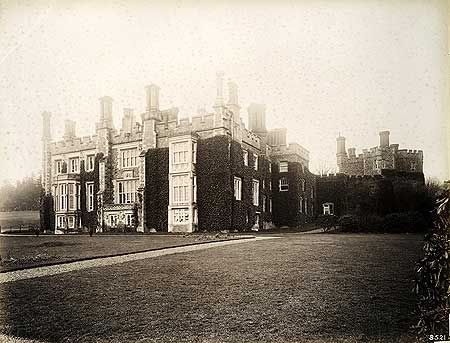
Eggesford House in 1888, viewed from SE. (English Heritage, Bedford Lemere and Co. collection, NMR ref. no.: BL08521)

John Christie, the founder of Glyndebourne Opera Festival, was born here in 1882. Three years later, Thomas Hardy came to Eggesford, and left a description in one of his letters to his wife, dated 13 March 1885:

My Dearest Em
I arrived at Eggesford Station a little after 4, and found there Lord Portsmouth's brougham waiting to take me up to the house, so there was no trouble at all. The scenery here is lovely and the house very handsome, which is on a hill in the park. I have had tea with Lady Portsmouth and the ladies-the only members of the family at home-Lord Portsmouth not having returned from the hunting yet (6 p.m.). The young ladies are very attractive, and interested in what I tell them-Lady Portsmouth charges them to take care of me-and goes away to her parish people, etc. altogether a delightful household. There are ladies here too, visiting, but of course I have only had a glimpse as yet. They sympathize with you – and Lady Portsmouth says you MUST come when you are well. I am now in the library writing this. I should say that a married daughter, Lady Rosamond Christie, I think she is, who is here, strikes me as a particularlarly sensible woman. If Lady Portsmouth's orders are to be carried out my room will be like a furnace – she is so particularly anxious that I should not take cold, etc. The drawing room is lined with oak panels from a monastery. When I arrived the schoolchildren were practisising singing in the hall, for Sunday in Church

In haste (as you will believe)

yours ever

Tom

== Church monuments ==
There are several memorial monuments in the church, including two particularly fine ones of the Chichester family which include very high quality alabaster effigies, namely monuments to:

- Edward Chichester, 1st Viscount Chichester (1568–1648) and his wife Anne Copleston (1588–1616), heiress of Eggesford, against the north wall of the north aisle. On a tablet above to the right is inscribed a memorial to Anne's parents John Copleston Esq., (died 1606) and his wife Dorothy Biston (d.29 July 1601).
- Arthur Chichester, 1st Earl of Donegall (1606–1674) and his two wives, the eldest son of Edward Chichester, 1st Viscount Chichester, an exceptionally fine and ornate monument, situated against the south wall of the nave, directly opposite the entrance to the church via the north porch. This monument was originally sited within the ancient stone arch separating the chancel from the Chichester Chapel in the north aisle.
