= William Fellowes (barrister) =

English barrister

William Fellowes F.R.S.
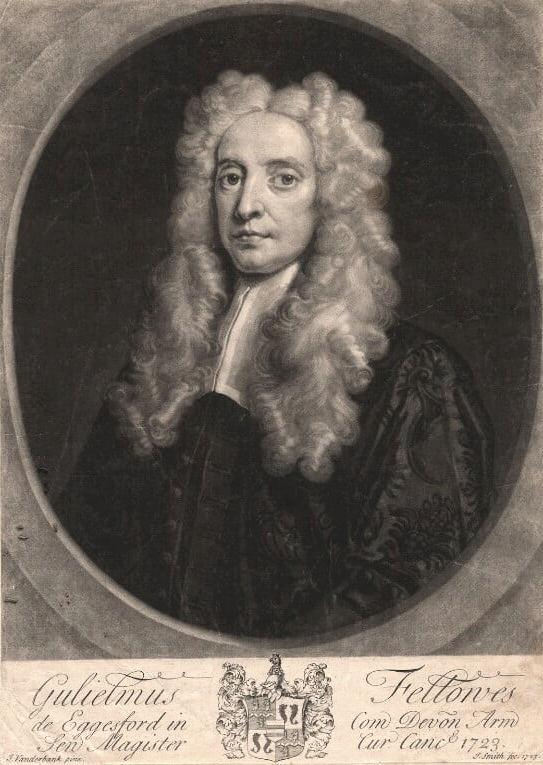
- Engraved portrait of William Fellowes from 1723
- Born: 1660
- Died: 1724 (aged 63–64)
- Occupation: barrister
- Children: Coulson Fellowes, William Fellowes of Shotesham Park

William Fellowes (1660–1724) was an English barrister, a Master in Chancery from 1707. He was elected a Fellow of the Royal Society in 1704.

== Life ==
Born 4 October 1660, he was the son of William Fellowes of London. His mother was Susanna Coulson, daughter of William Coulson of Greenwich, and sister of Thomas Coulson the Member of Parliament. He was educated at Enfield Grammar School, under Robert Uvedale. He matriculated at Trinity College, Cambridge in 1677. In 1678 he was admitted to Lincoln's Inn, and he was called to the bar in 1686.

In 1700 Fellowes was one of the trustees of forfeited estates in Ireland, in connection with the Crown Lands, Forfeited Estates Act 1698.

Fellowes was left money in the will of his father-in-law, who died in 1718, with a requirement it should be spent on property in Devon. That year he bought the manor of Eggesford in Devon, from Arthur St Leger; and rebuilt Eggesford House there. In the early 1720s Fellowes bought Shotesham Park in Norfolk, for his third son, William. At the end of his life he owned £20,000 in East India Company stock.

== Death, will and legacy ==
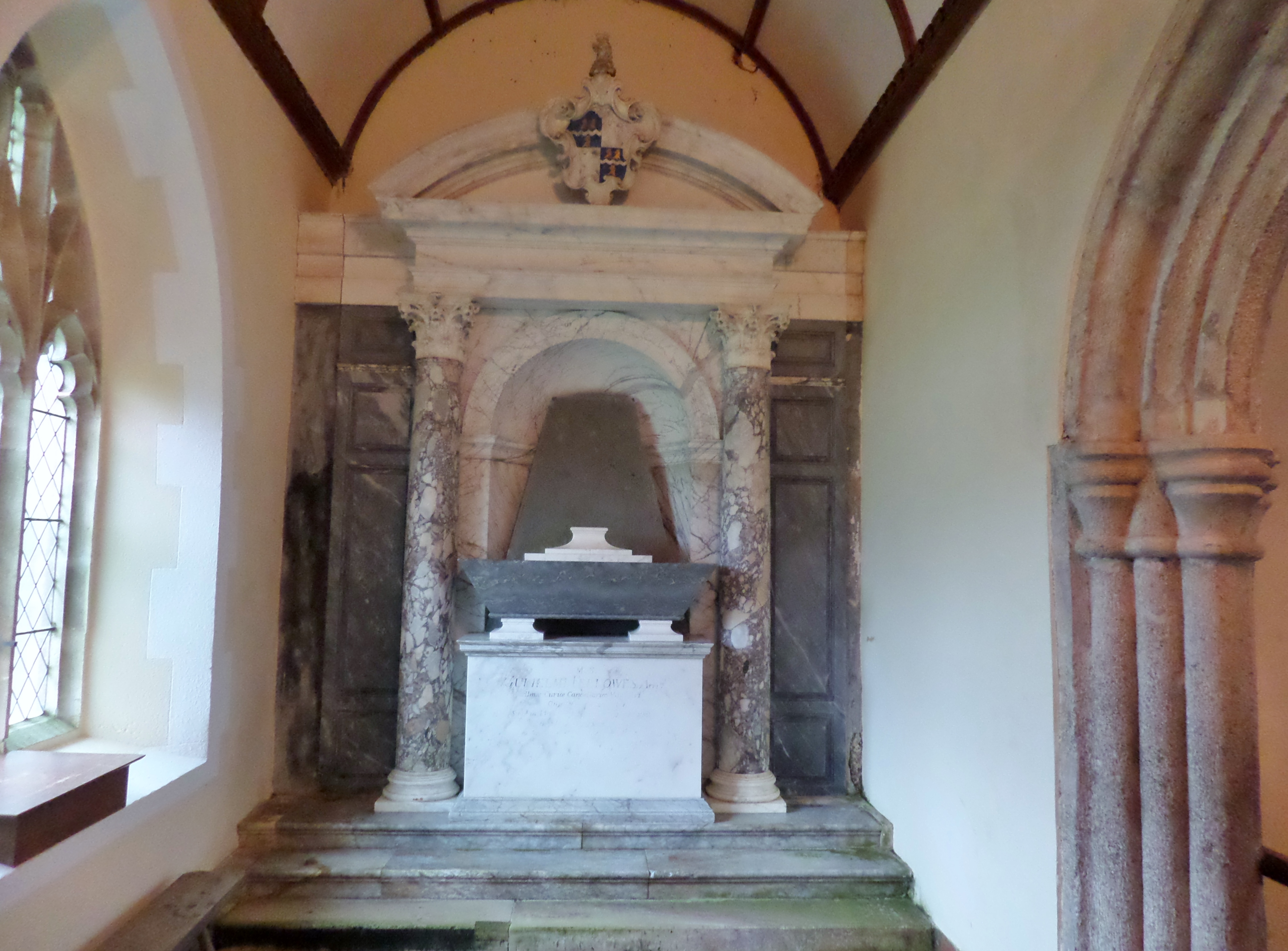
Memorial to William Fellowes, in All Saints, Church, Eggesford

Fellowes died on 19 January 1724, and was buried at Eggesford. His residuary heir was his eldest son Coulson.

His brother Sir John Fellowes, 1st Baronet, mentioned in his will, died later that year, on 26 July, without issue. His principal legatee was Edward Fellowes, brother to John and William. Edward was executor to both his brothers, and died in 1731.

Eggesford House was demolished about 1832 by Newton Fellowes, who replaced it.

== Family ==
Fellowes in 1695 married Mary Martin or Martyn, daughter of the London merchant Joseph Martyn. They had four sons and two daughters:

- Coulson Fellowes (1696–1769), Member of Parliament for Huntingdonshire. He married in 1725 Urania Herbert, daughter of Francis Herbert of Oakly Park, Shropshire, Member of Parliament for Ludlow. William Fellowes (MP, died 1804) was their son.
- Dorothea (1697–1747).
- Martin Fellowes (1702–1732), married Jane Clark.
- Mary (baptised 1704 – 1762), married 1725 Robert Eyre, Member of Parliament for Southampton, son of Robert Eyre, Chief Justice of Common Pleas.
- William Fellowes of Shotesham Park (1706–1775), father of Robert Fellowes, Member of Parliament for Norwich.
- John Fellowes (1712–1714).

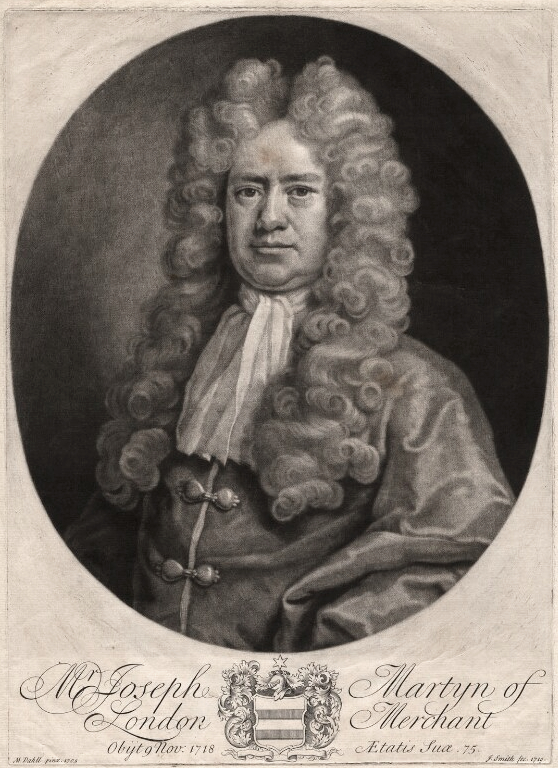
Joseph Martyn (1643–1718), sugar merchant and agent for West Indian planters, father-in-law of William Fellows

Martyn was a sugar merchant in Love Lane. He had spent time on Nevis, and acted as London agent for the Leeward Islands planters. In 1696 John Oldmixon, in financial difficulties, took out a mortgage on a family property, the manor of Oldmixon (now part of Weston-super-Mare). The mortgage was with Martyn and Fellowes. Oldmixon not exercising a redemption option, they took legal control of the property in 1699. In 1703 Martyn, Fellowes and Thomas Andrews, another son-in-law to Martyn, acted as executors to Martin Madan, slave-owner on Nevis, and father of Martin Madan the future Member of Parliament. Martin Madan of Northill took out a mortgage with Martyn and Fellowes around 1699.
