= Statue of William Pitt the Younger =

Statue in London, England

Coordinates: 51.5136°N 0.1437°W

William Pitt the Younger
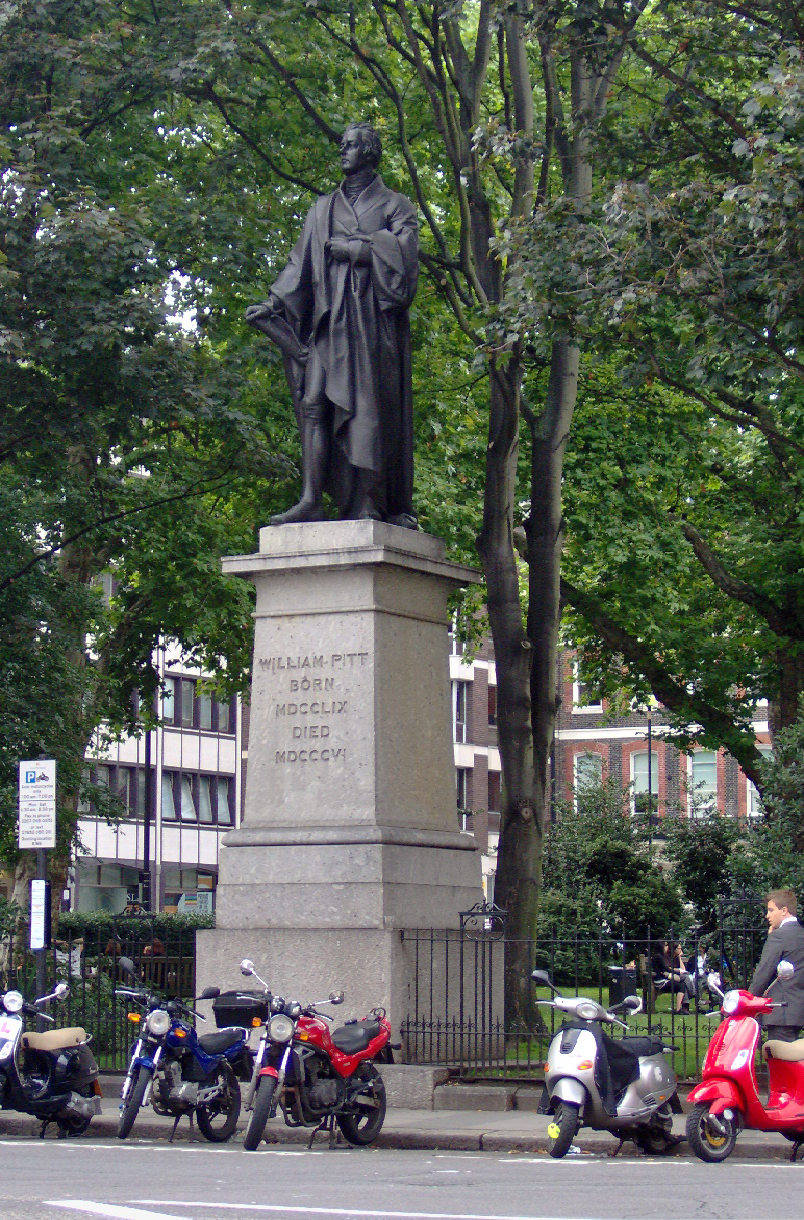
- Artist: Francis Leggatt Chantrey
- Completion date: 1831
- Subject: William Pitt the Younger
- Location: London

Listed Building – Grade II
- Official name: Statue of William Pitt the Younger (On Axis at South End of Square Garden)
- Designated: 24 February 1958
- Reference no.: 1229424

The statue of William Pitt the Younger is a Grade II listed statue at the southern end of Hanover Square. Designed by Francis Leggatt Chantrey, the statue was erected in 1831.

William Pitt the Younger is, as of 2025, the youngest Prime Minister in British history. Pitt was something of a favourite for George III, and was until George's death deeply involved in British affairs regarding the Napoleonic Wars. After the Battle of Trafalgar Pitt said in a speech at London's Guildhall, "England has saved herself by her exertions and will, as I trust, save Europe by her example".

A statue was intended to be put up after Pitt's resignation due to poor health in 1801, with funds being raised for such a cause. During his second time in power however the political implications made the prospect of such a statue impossible at least until his death not long after. Pitt's early death saw statues and monuments quickly erected in Glasgow and Cambridge as well as Westminster Abbey and Guildhall. The statue on Hanover Square was commissioned in 1825, a little while later than some of the other monuments dedicated to him.

The statue is of bronze on a granite pedestal and in total 27 feet (8.2 m) tall. While creating it, Chantrey wrote indecisively to Sir John Soane, 'is it high enough or too high'. Due to an episode of political upheaval during the First Reform Bill, the statue became controversial, with Whig supporters attempting to tear down it down. Upon hearing the news of this, Chantrey responded "the cramps are leaded and they may pull till Doomsday".

The statue is among many which have been declared "the best statue in London".
