= St Philomena's Catholic High School for Girls =

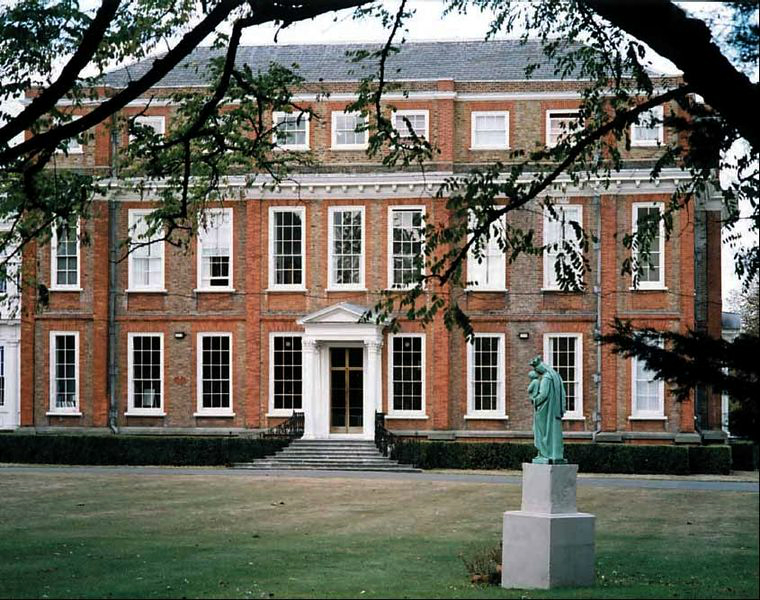

Location
- Shorts Road; Carshalton, Greater London, SM5 3PS; England; 51°21′56″N 0°10′09″W

Information
- Type: Voluntary aided school
- Motto: Nisi Dominus aedific vanum ("Unless the Lord build the house, they labour in vain who build it". – Psalm 127)
- Religious affiliation: Roman Catholic
- Established: 1893
- Closed: N/A
- Local authority: Sutton
- Department for Education URN: 103013 Tables
- Ofsted: Reports
- Chair: Mary Ryan
- Headteacher: Maria Noone
- Gender: Girls
- Age: 11 to 18
- Enrolment: As of 2024: 1479
- Capacity: 1549
- Houses: St Rose, St Catherine, St Teresa, St Clare, St Cecilia, St Bernadette, St Monica, St Angela
- Publication: The Philomenian
- Website: www.stphils.org.uk

St Philomena's Catholic High School for Girls is a school for girls (aged 11–18) in Carshalton in the London Borough of Sutton.

== History ==
=== Foundation ===
The school was founded by the Daughters of the Cross in 1893 and is situated in twenty-five acres of parkland with some notable buildings. The main building on the property was once Carshalton House, a grand manor house built in the early eighteenth century by Edward Carleton. It was the home of the physician, Dr. John Radcliffe, until his death in 1714. Other owners included Sir John Fellowes, 1st Baronet, Sub-Governor of the South Sea Company; Lord Anson, admiral; and Philip Yorke, 1st Earl of Hardwicke, Lord High Chancellor.

=== Modern ===
In 2004, the school was awarded Technology College status. In April 2006, it was awarded a Language College status alongside the Technology College status. In 2007, a new Learning Resource Centre, including a library, was opened.

In 2016, a new classroom block, the Veritas Centre opened. The new block consists of eight total classrooms, the ground floor accommodating two Food Technology classrooms and two Science laboratories, and the upper floor with dual-purpose Arts and Textiles classrooms. Staff/equipment rooms that connect between classrooms are also on each floor.

== Inspections ==
In 2008, Ofsted judged the school to be Outstanding. The next full inspection was in 2022, with a judgement of Good. As of 2024, this is the most recent inspection.

== Controversy ==
In April 2012, a student reported St Philomena's to PinkNews for urging its pupils to sign an anti-gay marriage petition in protest at the government's proposal to allow gay couples to marry in civil ceremonies.

== Alumni ==
- Finola O'Farrell DBE (b. 1960) – High Court judge and barrister
- Margaret Prosser OBE (b. 1937) – Labour life peer and former trade unionist
