= Finola O'Farrell =

British jurist (born 1960)

The Honourable Mrs Justice O'Farrell DBE KC

High Court Judge
- Incumbent
- Assumed office 3 October 2016
- Monarchs: Elizabeth II; Charles III

Personal details
- Born: 15 December 1960 (age 65) United Kingdom
- Spouse: Stuart Andrews (m. 1993; died 2010)
- Children: 1
- Education: Durham University

Dame Finola Mary Lucy O'Farrell (born 15 December 1960), officially titled The Honourable Mrs Justice O'Farrell, is a British jurist who has served as a High Court Judge since 2016.

== Early life ==
Finola O'Farrell was educated at St Philomena's Catholic High School for Girls and later earned a bachelor's degree from Durham University in 1982.

== Career ==
O'Farrell was called to the Bar in 1983 at the Inner Temple and practised construction and energy law. In 2002, she became a QC and was appointed as a Recorder in 2007. On 3 October 2016, she was appointed as a High Court judge and was appointed a Dame Commander of the Order of the British Empire in the same year. She is Judge in Charge of the Technology and Construction Court. She is also the judge responsible for the Mariana dam disaster case against BHP.

== Personal life ==
In 1993, she married Stuart Andrews with whom she has one daughter. He died in 2010.
