= Sir John Fellowes, 1st Baronet =

Fellows baronets
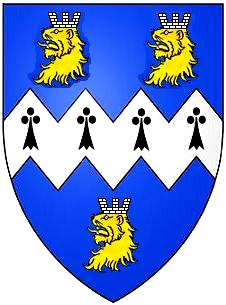
- Escutcheon of Fellowes
- Creation date: 1719
- Status: extinct
- Extinction date: 1724
- Arms: Azure, a fess ermine dancetty, between three lion's heads or murally crowned (Fellowes, shown). Also quartering Coulson (Colston): argent, two barbels hauriant respectant, as on memorial (seen more clearly on an imari ware dish).

Sir John Fellowes, 1st Baronet (baptised 1670 – 1724) was an English merchant who was one of the founding directors of the South Sea Company.

== Life ==
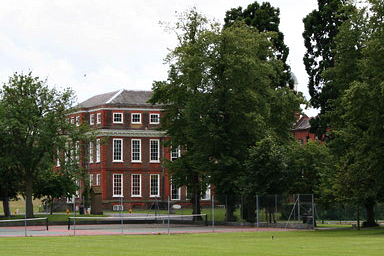
The former Carshalton House, now a school, 2008 photograph

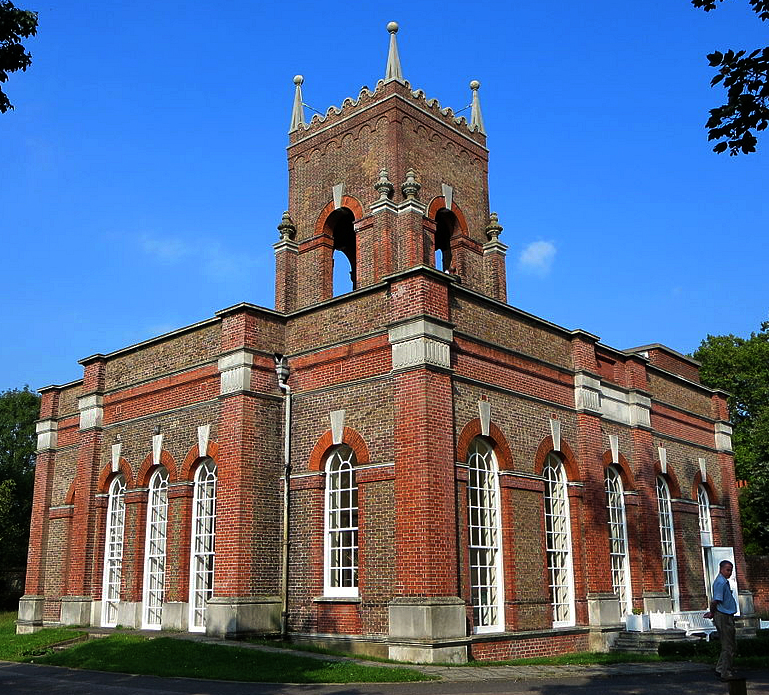
Carshalton Water Tower, built for John Fellows

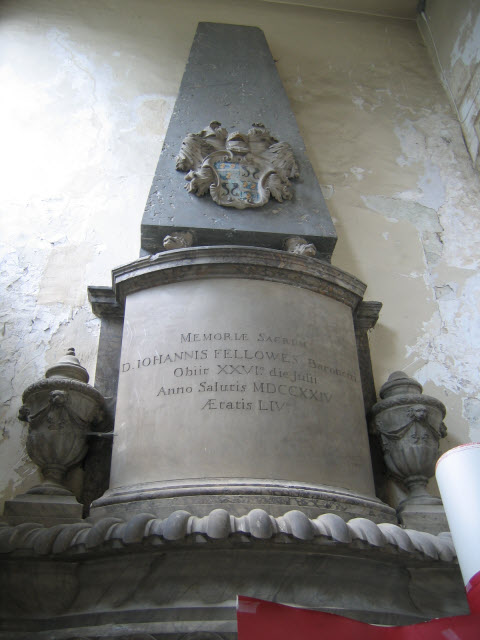
Memorial to Sir John Fellowes, All Saints' Church, Carshalton

He was the fourth son of the London merchant William Fellowes and his wife Susannah Coulson, baptised 15 February 1670; William Fellowes was his elder brother. He traded in cochineal, but came to concentrate on work as a financier.

In 1712 Fellowes gave communion plate to St Michael Paternoster Royal, with his brother William. He was the residual heir of Thomas Coulson, his mother's brother, who died in 1713. Coulson was buried in a vault on the north side of the chancel of St Michael Paternoster Royal, built in 1712 by William and John Fellowes.

== Seat at Carshalton House ==
John Radcliffe, who was on good terms with Coulson, bought a house at Carshalton from Edward Carlton, and died there in 1714. The house came into the ownership of the Daughters of the Cross. It is now part of St Philomena's Catholic High School for Girls.

Fellowes then purchased Carshalton House, in 1715. But a legal issue on its title arose: Edward Carlton, a tobacco merchant, had been declared bankrupt. Carlton (or Carleton) owed money to the Crown, on his death in 1713. After the accession in 1714 of George I of Great Britain, properties held by Carlton were granted to Fellowes, including a copper mill. The legal and tax position was rectified, for the properties that had come to Fellowes from Carlton, by a device suggested by Sir William Scawen. It involved Thomas Scawen buying the house, and selling it on in 1716 to Fellowes.

Fellowes had the Water Tower built there, at his seat, around 1721. Girouard calls it "The best surviving example of domestic water-architecture of this period". The engineer was Richard Cole. It had a water-wheel, powered by a mill-stream under the tower coming from an artificial pond. Water was pumped both to the house and to a bathroom in the base of the tower. Above were an orangery, saloon, robing room and a long gallery. The battlements are an example of the sham medievalism of the time, seen also at Briggens House, built by Robert Chester, another South Sea Company director.

At Carshalton House, Fellowes also employed the garden designer Charles Bridgeman, and the nurseryman Joseph Carpenter of Brompton Park. The master builder and sculptor Giles Dance worked there in 1720. The architect Henry Joynes was there around 1720, perhaps being employed on the Water Tower. Christopher Blincoe, a plasterer, worked on the house in 1719–1720. Details of the furnishings were in the 1721 inventories of estates of South Sea Bubble figures. Mentioned were caffaw, a "rich silk cloth similar to damask", and culgee, a "figured Indian silk".

The Painted Parlour at Carshalton House is by Robert Robinson, a decorative painter and engraver who died in 1706. It therefore dates back to Edward Carlton's ownership. The Oak Parlour had an overmantel wooden carving of Fellowes's coat of arms. Fellowes added the third storey of the house. It has been described as "A large, solid block of nine by seven bays, built of yellow and red brick, with two storeys and an attic storey above the cornice".

The Hermitage at Carshalton House may as a building date from Bridgeman's formal garden design for Fellowes. The name isn't attested until the 19th century.

== Later life and death ==
Fellowes was noted by Habakkuk as being, at the time of the South Sea Bubble speculation, one of the richest of the directors of the South Sea Company. Sir James Bateman, a Tory ally of Robert Harley, had the "central role" of sub-governor of the company from around 1711 to his death in November 1718. Fellowes was his successor, and in February 1719 signed a proposal for the South Sea Company going forward, paying down the government debt, with Charles Joye as deputy-governor.

In the South Sea Company Act 1720, Fellowes was named as "late Sub-Governor", at the head of the group singled out for "many notorious, fraudulent and indirect Practices". He was also the first of the South Sea Company directory to be called before the parliamentary committee of investigation in 1721. He was fined heavily, nearly all of his personal fortune being distrained. He kept the use of Carshalton House, living there until his death in 1724.

The sugar refineries owned by Fellowes, about ten around the London area, continued in business in 1723.

== Estate and legacy ==
Fellowes and Sir William Scawen contributed, with others, to the building of the galleries in All Saints' Church, Carshalton, at the beginning of the 18th century.

The Norfolk Record Office has an archive of Fellowes family records. A "File of receipts to Edward Fellowes for annuities under will of Sir John Fellowes shows that his brother Edward dealt with the estate of Sir John, acting as executor. He was the principal legatee. Edward Fellowes died in 1731. As executor he had dealings with Coulson Fellowes, son of William Fellowes, and nephew of Sir John.

Edward Fellowes bought confiscated assets of Sir John's some days before the latter's death in 1724. On his death, his properties passed to his nephew Coulson Fellowes, who disposed of them piecemeal. The copper mill, known as the Carshalton Lower Mill, went to Thomas Scawen, a nephew of Sir William Scawen.

== Fellows baronets, of Carshalton (1719) ==
The Fellows Baronetcy of Carshalton in the County of Surrey, in the Baronetage of Great Britain was created on 20 January 1719 for John Fellowes. Because Fellowes left no heir, the title became extinct on his death in 1724.

Baronetage of Great Britain
New creation	Baronet (of Carshalton); 1719–1724	Extinct
Preceded by Oughton baronets	Fellowes baronets of Carshalton; 20 January 1719	Succeeded by Chardin baronets
