= John Wallop, 2nd Earl of Portsmouth =

British nobleman (1742–1797)

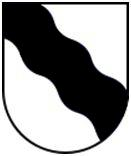
Arms of Wallop, Earls of Portsmouth: Argent, a bend wavy sable

John Wallop, 2nd Earl of Portsmouth (29 June 1742 – 16 May 1797), styled Hon. John Wallop from 1743 to 1749 and Viscount Lymington from 1749 to 1762, was a British nobleman.

He was the son of John Wallop, Viscount Lymington and his wife Catherine. Through his father he inherited the Wallop electoral interests at Andover, near the family seat of Hurstbourne Park, and through his mother, those of the Conduitt family at Whitchurch, although his influence there had ceased by 1774. His father died at the age of 31 in 1749; Wallop, now styled "Viscount Lymington," did not inherit the earldom from his grandfather until 1762. On 1 October 1755, he was created a DCL of Oxford.

On 27 August 1763, Portsmouth married Urania Fellowes (d. 1812), daughter of Coulson Fellowes. They had four sons and four daughters:

- John Wallop, 3rd Earl of Portsmouth (1767–1853)
- Lady Urania Anabella Wallop (1 June 1769 – 17 December 1844)
- Lady Camilla Maria Wallop (8 November 1770 – 10 September 1789)
- Newton Fellowes, 4th Earl of Portsmouth (1772–1854), who adopted the surname of Fellowes in 1794
- Hon. Coulson Wallop (1774–1807)
- Lady Henrietta Dorothea Wallop (6 May 1780 – 10 June 1862), married 19 January 1815 (O.S.) Rev. John Comyns Churchill
- Lady Emma Maria Wallop (13 August 1781 – 22 May 1798)
- Hon. William Fellowes Wallop (20 May 1784 – 20 November 1790)

Peerage of Great Britain
Preceded by John Wallop	Earl of Portsmouth; 1767–1797	Succeeded by John Wallop
