= Carshalton House =

Country house and school in London, England

General information
- Type: Originally residential
- Architectural style: Georgian
- Location: London, England
- Coordinates: 51°21′52″N 0°10′08″W
- Completed: c. 1710

Listed Building – Grade II*
- Official name: Carshalton House
- Designated: 16 March 1954
- Reference no.: 1065627

Carshalton House is a former country house in Carshalton now part of London. The house is Grade II* listed. It currently houses the St Philomena's School.

== History and description ==
The house was built around 1710 for tobacco merchant Edward Carleton who became bankrupt just a few years later in 1713, and died that same year. The house was sold to John Radcliffe in 1714 before dying shortly after, with John Fellowes purchasing Carshalton House in 1715. A legal issue on the title arose however, as Edward Carleton, upon bankruptcy, had owed money to the Crown on his death. After the accession in 1714 of George I of Great Britain, properties held by Carleton were granted to Fellowes, including a copper mill. The legal and tax position was rectified, for the properties that had come to Fellowes from Carlton, by a device suggested by Sir William Scawen. It involved Thomas Scawen buying the house, and selling it on in 1716 to Fellowes.

Fellowes laid out gardens, employing Charles Bridgeman and Joseph Carpenter, nurseryman of Brompton Park. The gardens of the house feature an 18th-century Water Tower, Hermitage, possibly from the time of Bridgeman, which was restored in the early 1990s, as well as the rustic-style "Folly Bridge". Fellowes faced investigation and bankruptcy following the South Sea Bubble crash and South Sea Company Act 1720, with his personal fortune being distrained. Despite this, he kept the use of Carshalton House, living there until his death in 1724.

Later residents of the house include Thomas Walpole, nephew of Robert Walpole, who was likely the creator of the Blue or Adam Room. George Amyand, Admiral Lord Anson and Lord Chancellor Philip Yorke.

From 1847, the house began being used as a school of various kinds. First it was leased to the Board of Ordnance and used as a preparatory school and was sold around 1860 to a Reverend Alfred Barret who moved his school from North Cheam to Carshalton. Following his death, the estate was put up for sale with Alfred's son Charles moving the school once again to Wandsworth in 1887. The house eventually came into the ownership of the Daughters of the Cross and began being used for the St Philomena's Catholic High School for Girls which was founded in 1893. The school made extensions to the house, adding a gym and other facilities, and remain the current occupants.

=== Water Tower ===
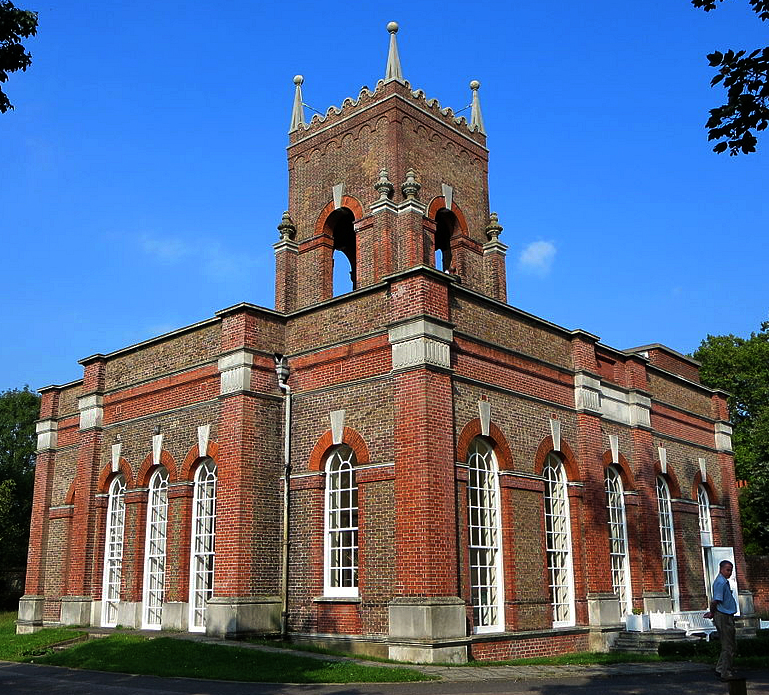
The Water Tower

A significant feature of the house's grounds is the Grade II* listed Water Tower (or Bagnio as it was known at the time) which was built around 1721. It was put up under Fellowes with Henry Joynes likely its architect and Richard Cole as its engineer, primarily to house a water driven pump supplying water to the house and the fountains in its gardens. It was planned as a multi-purpose building, and also contains an orangery, a saloon and a bathroom which retains original Delft tiles.

The tower, a significant structure, is considered an exceptional example of surviving early Georgian water-architecture. Its original water wheel was removed in 1960.
