= William Fellowes (MP, died 1804) =

English politician

William Fellowes (c. 1726 – 10 February 1804) was an English politician.

== Life ==
The son of Coulson Fellowes of Ramsey Abbey, Huntingdonshire, and his wife, Urania Herbert, William Fellowes matriculated at St John's College, Cambridge in 1744, aged 17.

Fellowes entered parliament in 1768 as member for Ludlow: his mother's brother, Henry Herbert, 1st Earl of Powis, brought him in unopposed with his local interest. He generally supported the administrations of Augustus FitzRoy, 3rd Duke of Grafton and Lord North. He did not stand in the 1774 general election. He was High Sheriff of Cambridgeshire and Huntingdonshire in 1779.

In 1774, Fellowes had agreed to support Viscount Hinchingbrooke in Huntingdonshire, so acquiring the support of the Tory John Montagu, 4th Earl of Sandwich, his father. He returned to parliament in 1784 for Andover, once more unopposed, backed by John Wallop, 2nd Earl of Portsmouth, married to his sister Urania. He held the Andover seat until 1796, but is not recorded as speaking in the House of Commons, and had a meagre voting record.

Fellowes died on 10 February 1804 in Grosvenor Street, London.

== Family ==
Fellowes married in 1768, Lavinia Smyth, daughter of James Smyth of St Audries in Somerset. They had three sons and two daughters. William Henry Fellowes was their eldest son. Edward Fellowes R.N. was another son.

=== Ancestry ===
Ancestors of William Fellowes (MP, died 1804)

8. William Fellowes
4. William Fellowes
9. Susannah Coulson
2. Coulston Fellowes MP
10. Sir Joseph Martin of London
5. Mary Martin
11.
1. William Fellowes
6. Francis Herbert
104. Richard Herbert, Lord of Cherbury
52. Edward Herbert, 1st Baron Herbert of Cherbury
105. Magdalen Herbert
26. Richard Herbert, 2nd Baron Herbert of Chirbury MP
13. Florentia Herbert m.Richard Herbert of Oakley Park
108. Thomas Egerton, 1st Viscount Brackley MP
54. John Egerton, 1st Earl of Bridgewater
109. Alice Spencer, Countess of Derby
27. Lady Mary Egerton
3. Urania Herbert
7. Dorothy Oldbury
