= Newton Fellowes, 4th Earl of Portsmouth =

English politician (1772–1854)

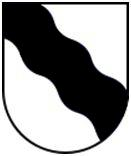
Arms of Wallop, Earls of Portsmouth: Argent, a bend wavy sable

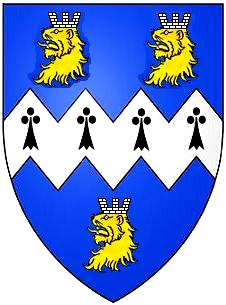
Arms of Fellowes of Eggesford, Devon: Azure, a fesse indented ermine between three lion's heads erased or murally crowned argent. These arms were adopted by royal licence in 1794 by Newton Wallop, later 4th Earl, together with the surname Fellows on his inheritance of the manor of Eggesford. The 5th Earl reverted to the ancient Wallop arms and name, but without royal licence

Newton Fellowes, 4th Earl of Portsmouth (26 June 1772 – 9 January 1854) was an English politician, styled Hon. Newton Wallop until 1794 and Hon. Newton Fellowes from 1794 to 1853. He was Member of Parliament (MP) for Andover from 1802 to 1820, and (with his brother-in-law Viscount Ebrington) MP for North Devon from 1832 to 1837.

== Origins ==
Newton Fellowes was born the Hon. Newton Wallop, the third son of John Wallop, 2nd Earl of Portsmouth and Urania Fellowes.

== Education ==
He was educated at Trinity College, Cambridge, becoming MA in 1792.

== Career ==
In 1794 he succeeded to the estates of his uncle Henry Arthur Fellowes at Eggesford in Devon, taking the name and arms of Fellowes. Fellowes retired from Parliament in 1837. He briefly succeeded to the peerage as Earl of Portsmouth on the death of his brother in 1853. An obituarist described Fellowes as "always a zealous and energetic supporter of Liberal politics, but at the same time his manners were cordial and conciliatory to all parties". He was instrumental in building the road between Exeter and Barnstaple, and later promoted the railway in North Devon.

== Marriages and children ==
Fellowes married twice:

- Firstly to Frances Sherard (died 1819), by whom he had two sons and three daughters:
  - Lady Henrietta Caroline Fellowes (1798–1880); married Joseph Chichester Nagle (1792–1880) in 1826 and had issue.
  - Henry Arthur Wallop Fellowes (1799–1847), MP for Andover, who predeceased his father.
  - Newton John Alexander Fellowes (1801–1801), died young.
- Secondly in 1820 to Lady Catherine Fortescue (1787 – 20 May 1854), a daughter of Hugh Fortescue, 1st Earl Fortescue (1753–1841). The couple had one son and three daughters:
  - Lady Catherine Henrietta Fellowes (1821–1900); married Seymour Phillips Allen (d. 1861) in 1843 and had issue.
  - Isaac Newton Wallop, 5th Earl of Portsmouth (1825–1891)
  - Lady Hester Urania Wallop (died 1887); married Ralph Merrick Leeke (1813–1882) in 1847 and had issue.
  - Lady Camilla Eleanor Wallop (died August 1920); married her maternal first cousin Hon. Dudley Fortescue on 8 June 1852, no issue.

Parliament of the United Kingdom
Preceded by Coulson Wallop; Thomas Assheton Smith I	Member of Parliament for Andover; 1802–1820; With: Thomas Assheton Smith I	Succeeded by Sir John Pollen; Thomas Assheton Smith I
New constituency	Member of Parliament for North Devon; 1832–1837; With: Viscount Ebrington	Succeeded by Viscount Ebrington; Sir Thomas Dyke Acland
Peerage of Great Britain
Preceded by John Wallop	Earl of Portsmouth; 1853–1854	Succeeded by Isaac Newton Wallop
