= John Wallop, 3rd Earl of Portsmouth =

British nobleman

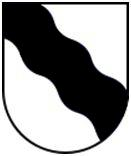
Arms of Wallop, Earls of Portsmouth: Argent, a bend wavy sable

John Charles Wallop, 3rd Earl of Portsmouth (18 December 1767 – 14 July 1853), styled Viscount Lymington until 1797, was a British nobleman and lunatic.

The Earl was known from an early age to have an unsound mind, and his estate was placed under the control of four trustees. While Portsmouth had periods in which he appeared sane, he often engaged in a variety of bizarre and sadistic behaviour. He whipped his servants, beat and bled his horses, and slaughtered cattle, shouting, with an axe. The Earl showed a remarkable mania for funerals, which he referred to as "black jobs". He attended them frequently, insisted on tolling the bells at Hurstbourne for funerals there, and sometimes flogged the ringers with the bellrope afterwards.

On 19 November 1799, Portsmouth married Hon. Grace Norton, the sister of one of his trustees, William Norton, 2nd Baron Grantley. The marriage was encouraged by Portsmouth's younger brother, Hon. Newton Fellowes, as Grace was 47 years old at the marriage (Portsmouth was 31) and unlikely to produce an heir to displace Newton. However, Grace also played an important role in moderating Portsmouth's behaviour and keeping his eccentricities out of the public eye. When, in 1808, she found herself no longer able to control the Earl, her relative, Dr. John Combe, was added to the household, to help suppress Portsmouth's manias.

One of the trustees, Portsmouth's solicitor John Hanson, saw an opportunity at Grace's death in 1813. Without informing the other trustees or Portsmouth's brother Newton, he quickly arranged a marriage between Portsmouth and his daughter, Mary Anne. They were married on 7 March 1814; Lord Byron, another one of Hanson's clients, gave the bride away. When Newton attempted to have Portsmouth declared insane that autumn, Byron's affidavit as to the circumstances of the marriage was instrumental in getting the charge dismissed. However, the new Countess was by no means equal to the task of controlling Portsmouth; his behaviour grew more erratic, while Mary Anne carried on an adulterous affair with William Alder, who fathered three children with her. Eventually, the pair of lovers grew so bold as to have intercourse in the same bed with the Earl (who was almost certainly impotent).

A new commission de lunatico inquirendo took place in 1823, at the instigation of Portsmouth's nephew Henry Wallop Fellowes, and it was revealed that the Earl had been badly mistreated by his new wife and her lover, who had spat on him and beaten him. He was adjudged to have been insane since 1809. In 1828, his second marriage was annulled, and Mary Anne's children were declared bastards. A judgment for the £40,000 cost of the trial was issued against her, and she fled abroad.

Portsmouth died in 1853; his brother Newton succeeded him for less than half a year before his own death.

== Bibliography ==
- Akihito Suzuki (2006). Madness at Home: The Psychiatrist, the Patient, and the Family in England, 1820-1860. University of California Press.
- Elizabeth Foyster (2016). The Trials of the King of Hampshire: Madness, Secrecy and Betrayal in Georgian England. Oneworld Publications. ISBN 978-1780749600.

Peerage of Great Britain
Preceded by John Wallop	Earl of Portsmouth; 1797–1853	Succeeded by Newton Fellowes
