= Pollen (disambiguation) =

Pollen is a powdery substance in plant reproduction.

Pollen may also refer to:

== People ==
- Arabella Rosalind Hungerford Pollen, English couturier and author
- Arthur Pollen, writer on naval affairs
- Daniel Pollen, ninth Premier of New Zealand
- Francis Pollen, English architect
- Geir Pollen, Norwegian poet, novelist and translator
- John Hungerford Pollen (senior) (1820–1902), English writer on crafts and furniture
- John Hungerford Pollen (Jesuit) (1858–1925), English Jesuit, known as a historian of the Protestant Reformation
- Ole Petter Pollen, Norwegian sailor
- Peregrine Pollen (1931–2020), English auctioneer, father of Arabella Pollen
- Pollen Ndlanya, retired South African football player

== Art and entertainment ==
- Pollen (band), an American power pop band
- Pollen (novel), a 1995 science fiction novel by Jeff Noon
- Pollen (film), a 2011 documentary film by Disneynature
- Pollen (album), a 2023 album by musical duo Tennis
- Pollen (video game), a sci-fi video game

== Other uses ==
- Pet pollen, or dander, material shed from the body of various animals
- Pollen Island, island in New Zealand
- Pollèn, Italy, a town in Italy

== See also ==
- Polen (disambiguation)
- Pollin
