= Pollen baronets =

Title in the Baronetage of Great Britain

Escutcheon of the Pollen baronets of Redenham

The Pollen Baronetcy of Redenham, in the County of Southampton, is a title in the Baronetage of Great Britain. It was created on 15 May 1795 for John Pollen, a Bencher of Lincoln's Inn. He was the son of John Pollen III, Member of Parliament for Andover, and his wife Hester St John, sister of Sir Paulet St John, 1st Baronet.

The 2nd Baronet was Member of Parliament for Andover 1820 to 1821, and 1835 to 1841. As of 2026 the Official Roll of the Baronetage marks the title "dormant".

== Pollen baronets, of Redenham (1795) ==
- Sir John Pollen, 1st Baronet (c. 1731–1814)
- John Walter Pollen, 2nd Baronet (1784–1863), MP for Andover 1820–1821 and 1835–1841, succeeded by his nephew.
- Sir Richard Hungerford Pollen, 3rd Baronet (1815–1881).
- Sir Richard Hungerford Pollen, 4th Baronet (1846–1918)
- Sir Richard Pollen, 5th Baronet (1878–1930)
- Sir John Launcelot Hungerford Pollen, 6th Baronet (1884–1959), or Lancelot.
- Sir John Michael Hungerford Pollen, 7th Baronet (1919–2003), He was succeeded by his only son.
- Richard John Hungerford Pollen, 8th Baronet (born 1946)

The heir apparent to the baronetcy is William Richard Hungerford Pollen (born 1976).

== Extended family ==
- John Hungerford Pollen (senior) (1820–1902), Catholic convert, second son of the 2rd Baronet.
- John Hungerford Pollen (Jesuit) (1858–1925), eldest son of John Hungerford Pollen senior.
- Francis Gabriel Hungerford Pollen (born 1862), 4th son of John Hungerford Pollen senior. His son John Francis Hungerford Pollen RN was the father of the 7th Baronet.
- Arthur Pollen (1866–1937) inventor, 6th son of John Hungerford Pollen senior.
- Clare Asquith (born 1951), scholar, is the daughter of the architect Francis Pollen, son of Arthur Pollen above.
- Arabella Pollen (born 1961) knitwear designer, now novelist, granddaughter of Walter Michael Hungerford Pollen, son of Francis Gabriel Hungerford Pollen above.

== Notes ==
Baronetage of Great Britain
Preceded by Hawley baronets	Pollen baronets of Redenham; 15 May 1795	Succeeded by Wentworth baronets
