= Polin =

Polin may refer to:

== People ==
- Polin Belisle (born 1966), marathon runner who represented Belize at the 1988 Summer Olympics
- Andrei Polin (born 1994), Russian footballer
- Captain Polin (1516–1578), French ambassador to the Ottoman Empire and General of the Galleys
- Claire Polin (1926–1995), American composer, musicologist and flutist
- Jason Polin (born 1999), American ice hockey player
- Kate Polin (born 1967), French photographer
- Peter Polin (1832–1870), American merchant and politician
- Raymond Polin (1910–2001), French philosopher
- Soth Polin (born 1943), Cambodian writer
- Stephen Polin (born 1947), American artist
- Vicki Polin, founder of the Awareness Center

== Other uses ==
- Polin, the Hebrew/Yiddish name of Poland
- POLIN Museum of the History of Polish Jews, a museum in Warsaw, Poland
- El Polin Spring, a natural spring in San Francisco, California
- Polin Waterparks, a Turkish manufacturer of water slides and water parks

== See also ==
- McPolin Farmstead is a historic farm north of Park City, Utah, United States
- Ramot Polin, a neighbourhood in northwest East Jerusalem
- Parigné-le-Pôlin, a commune in the Sarthe department in the region of Pays-de-la-Loire in north-western France
- Yvré-le-Pôlin, a commune in the Sarthe department in the region of Pays-de-la-Loire in north-western France
- Paulin (disambiguation)
- Polen (disambiguation)
- Pollin
