= John Hungerford Pollen =

John Hungerford Pollen may refer to:

- John Hungerford Pollen (senior) (1820–1902), English writer on crafts and furniture
- John Hungerford Pollen (Jesuit) (1858–1925), English Jesuit, known as a historian of the Protestant Reformation
