= John Pollen =

John Pollen may refer to:

- John Hungerford Pollen (senior) (1820–1902), English writer on crafts and furniture
- John Hungerford Pollen (Jesuit) (1858–1925), English Jesuit, known as a historian of the Protestant Reformation
- John Pollen (died 1775), British lawyer and politician
- John Pollen (died 1719), his father, MP for Andover
