= Polen =

Polen may refer to:

== Places ==
- Poland in many European languages
  - Names of Poland
- Polen, Iowa, an unincorporated community in Iowa, USA
- Poleň, Czech Republic
- Pollein (Valdôtain: Polèn), Aosta Valley, Italy
- Hotel Polen, Amsterdam, the Netherlands

== People ==
- Bram van Polen (born 1985), Dutch footballer
- Bruce Polen (born 1951), American football coach
- Dennis Polen, Polen Special designer
- Doug Polen (born 1960), American motorcycle road racer
- Nat Polen (1914—1981), American actor
- Rietrik Polén (1823–1884), Finnish journalist and lecture
- Polen Uslupehlivan (born 1990), Turkish female volleyball player

== Other uses ==
- Polen (album), a 2001 album by Lynda Thomas
- Polen Records, an independent music label based in Bogota, Colombia
- Polen Special, a homebuilt racing aircraft
- Polen (TV series), a 2026 Mexican television series

== See also ==
- Pollen (disambiguation)
- Polonia (disambiguation)
- Polonaise (disambiguation)
- Pologne (disambiguation)
