= Hawley baronets =

Set index for Hawley baronets

There have been two baronetcies created for persons with the surname Hawley, one in the Baronetage of England and one in the Baronetage of Great Britain. Both are extinct.

- Hawley baronets of Buckland (1644): see Baron Hawley
- Hawley baronets of Leybourne Grange (1795)
