= Pologne (disambiguation) =

Pologne is the French name for Poland.

Pologne may also refer to:

- Petite-Pologne, a historical area in 8th arrondissement of Paris
- Petite-Pologne, a historical region of south-eastern Poland
- Grande-Pologne, a historical region of west-central Poland
- La Pologne:
  - Haitian Creole
  - Polish Haitians
- Tour de Pologne, a road bicycle racing stage race in Poland
- Aigle Blanc de Pologne, Poland's highest order awarded to both civilians and the military for their merits
- Grand Orient de Pologne, Masonic grand lodge in Poland
- Le Moulin de Pologne, 1952 novel by the French writer Jean Giono
- La Pologne et les Affaires Occidentales, publication of L'Institut Occidental
- Union Cycliste de Pologne, national governing body of cycle racing in Poland

== See also ==
- Polonaise (disambiguation)
- Polonia (disambiguation)
- Polen (disambiguation)
