= Triangulazercon =

Scientific classification
- Domain: Eukaryota
- Kingdom: Animalia
- Phylum: Arthropoda
- Subphylum: Chelicerata
- Class: Arachnida
- Order: Mesostigmata
- Family: Zerconidae
- Genus: Triangulazercon; Jacot, 1938

Genus of mites

Triangulazercon is a genus of mites in the family Zerconidae.
