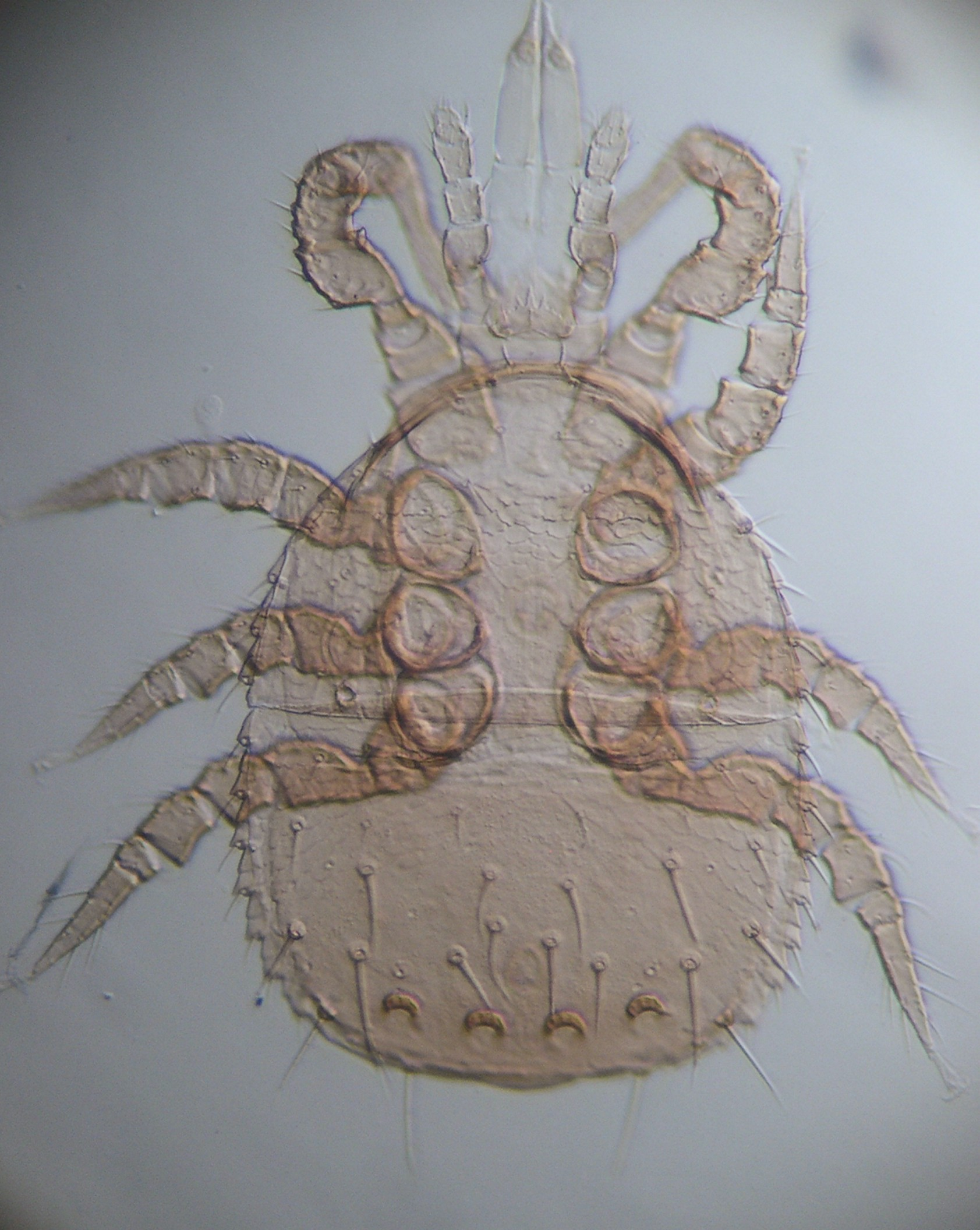
- Zercon gurensis

Scientific classification
- Kingdom: Animalia
- Phylum: Arthropoda
- Subphylum: Chelicerata
- Class: Arachnida
- Order: Mesostigmata
- Suborder: Monogynaspida
- Infraorder: Gamasina
- Superfamily: Zerconoidea
- Family: Zerconidae; Berlese, 1892

= Zerconidae =

Zerconidae Temporal range: Neogene–present

Family of mites

Zerconidae is a family of mites in the order Mesostigmata.

== Species ==
Acoesejus Selinick, 1941

- Acoesejus muricatus (Koch, 1839)

Aleksozercon A. D. Petrova, 1978

- Aleksozercon zachvatkini A. D. Petrova, 1978

Amerozercon Halasková, 1969

- Amerozercon suspiciosus Halasková, 1969

Aquilonozercon V. Halasková, 1979

- Aquilonozercon desuetus V. Halasková, 1979

Bakeras C. Blaszak, 1984

- Bakeras opiparus C. Blaszak, 1984

Blaszakzercon Kemal & Kocak, 2009

- Blaszakzercon pulcher (C. Blaszak, 1984)

Carpathozercon P. G. Balan, 1991

- Carpathozercon longiperitrematus P. G. Balan, 1991

Caurozercon Halasková, 1977

- Caurozercon duplex
- Caurozercon duplexoideus Ma, 2002
- Caurozercon similis Petrova, 1979
- Caurozercon smirnovi Petrova, 1979
- Caurozercon triplex Petrova, 1979

Cosmozercon C. Blaszak, 1981

- Cosmozercon setosus C. Blaszak, 1981

Echinozercon C. Blaszak, 1975

- Echinozercon americanus Blaszak, 1982
- Echinozercon orientalis C. Blaszak, 1975

Eurozercon V. Halasková, 1979

- Eurozercon aquilonis V. Halasková, 1979
- Eurozercon pacificus Halaskova, 1979

Hypozercon C. Blaszak, 1981

- Hypozercon macleani C. Blaszak, 1981

Indozercon C. Blaszak, 1978

- Indozercon janinae C. Blaszak, 1978

Kaikiozercon V. Halasková, 1979

- Kaikiozercon mamillosus Halaskova, 1979
- Kaikiozercon peregrinus V. Halasková, 1979

Koreozercon V. Halasková, 1979

- Koreozercon bacatus V. Halasková, 1979

Krantzas C. Blaszak, 1981

- Krantzas mirificus C. Blaszak, 1981

Lindquistas C. Blaszak, 1981

- Lindquistas amythetes C. Blaszak, 1981

Macrozercon Blaszak, 1975

- Macrozercon praecipuus (Sellnick, 1958)

Mesozercon Blaszak, 1975

- Mesozercon coreanus Blaszak, 1975
- Mesozercon dunhuaensis Ma, 2003
- Mesozercon plumatus (Aoki, 1966)

Metazercon Blaszak, 1975

- Metazercon athiasae Blaszak, 1975
- Metazercon mahunkai Halaskova, 1979
- Metazercon rafalskii Blaszak, Kaczmarek & Joon-Ho-Le, 1997

Microzercon Blaszak, 1975

- Microzercon californicus (Sellnick, 1958)

Mixozercon Halasková, 1963

- Mixozercon heterosetosus Balan, 1995
- Mixozercon sellnicki (Schweizer, 1948)

Monozercon C. Blaszak, 1984

- Monozercon aciculatus C. Blaszak, 1984

Neozercon Petrova, 1977

- Neozercon evgenii Petrova, 1978
- Neozercon insularis Petrova, 1977
- Neozercon smirnovi Petrova, 1978

†Paleozercon Blaszak, Cokendolpher & Polyak, 1995

- †Paleozercon cavernicolus Blaszak, Cokendolpher & Polyak, 1995

Parazercon Trägårdh, 1931

- Parazercon floralis Ma, 2002
- Parazercon ornatus (Berlese, 1903)
- Parazercon sergienkoae Balan, 1991

Parhozercon C. Blaszak, 1981

- Parhozercon medialis C. Blaszak, 1981

Polonozercon C. Blaszak, 1979

- Polonozercon tatrensis (Blaszak, 1974)

Prozercon Sellnick, 1943

- Prozercon achaeanus Ujvari, 2011
- Prozercon artvinensis Urhan & Ayyildiz, 1996
- Prozercon bircanae Urhan, 1998
- Prozercon boyacii Urhan & Ayyildiz, 1996
- Prozercon bulbiferus Ujvari, 2011
- Prozercon cambriensis Skorupski & Luxton, 1996
- Prozercon carpathicus Balan & Sergienko, 1990
- Prozercon carsticus Halaskova, 1963
- Prozercon changbaiensis Bei, Shi & Yin, 2002
- Prozercon demirsoyi Urhan & Ayyildiz, 1996
- Prozercon denizliensis Urhan, 2002
- Prozercon dominiaki Blaszak, 1979
- Prozercon dramaensis Ujvari, 2011
- Prozercon escalai Moraza, 1990
- Prozercon fimbriatus (C.L.Koch, 1839)
- Prozercon graecus Ujvari, 2011
- Prozercon juanensis Moraza, 1990
- Prozercon kafkasoricus Urhan, 1998
- Prozercon kamili Urhan & Ayyildiz, 1996
- Prozercon kochi Sellnick, 1943
- Prozercon kunsti Halaskova, 1963
- Prozercon kurui Urhan, 1998
- Prozercon luxtoni Urhan & Ayyildiz, 1996
- Prozercon mersinensis Urhan, 1998
- Prozercon micherdzinskii Blaszak, 1978
- Prozercon morazae Ujvari, 2011
- Prozercon norae Ujvari, 2011
- Prozercon orhani Urhan & Ayyildiz, 1996
- Prozercon ornatus (Berlese, 1904)
- Prozercon rafalskii Blaszak, 1971
- Prozercon satapliae Petrova, 1977
- Prozercon similis Balan, 1992
- Prozercon tellecheai Moraza, 1990
- Prozercon traegardhi (Halbert, 1923)
- Prozercon traegardhisimilis Solomon, 1984
- Prozercon turcicus Urhan & Ayyildiz, 1996
- Prozercon ukrainicus Balan, 1991
- Prozercon umidicola Urhan, 2002
- Prozercon usheri Blaszak, 1985
- Prozercon yavuzi Urhan, 1998

Rafas C. Blaszak, 1979

- Rafas bisternalis C. Blaszak, 1979
- Rafas blaszaki Urhan & Ayyildiz, 1996

Skeironozercon Halasková, 1977

- Skeironozercon embersoni Halaskova, 1977
- Skeironozercon tricavus Blaszak, 1982

Syskenozercon Athias-Henriot, 1977

- Syskenozercon kosiri Athias-Henriot, 1977

Triangulazercon Jacot, 1938

- Triangulazercon peltatus (C.L.Koch, 1836)

Trizerconoides Jacot, 1938

- Trizerconoides radiatus (Berlese, 1910)

Xenozercon Blaszak, 1976

- Xenozercon glaber Blaszak, 1976

Zercon C.L.Koch, 1836

- Zercon acanticus Blaszak, 1978
- Zercon acrochordus (Blaszak, 1979)
- Zercon adoxellus Blaszak, 1978
- Zercon adoxyphes Blaszak, 1979
- Zercon agnostus Blaszak, 1979
- Zercon amidrytus Blaszak, 1978
- Zercon amphibolus Blaszak, 1978
- Zercon andrei Sellnick, 1958
- Zercon aniellae Solomon, 1984
- Zercon apladellus Blaszak
- Zercon asaphus Blaszak, 1976
- Zercon asymmetricus Balan, 1991
- Zercon athiasi Vincze, 1965
- Zercon austriacus Sellnick, 1959
- Zercon ayyildizi Urhan, 1997
- Zercon bajcalensis Blaszak, 1979
- Zercon balearicus Athias Henriot, 1961
- Zercon beleviensis Urhan, 2002
- Zercon berlesei Sellnick, 1958
- Zercon bisetosus Balan, 1995
- Zercon blaszaki Solomon, 1982
- Zercon brachysetosus Balan, 1992
- Zercon bulgaricus Balogh, 1961
- Zercon burdurensis Urhan, 2001
- Zercon caenolestes Blaszak, 1976
- Zercon capillatus Berlese, 1914
- Zercon caucasicus Blaszak, 1979
- Zercon cazorlensis Athias Henriot, 1961
- Zercon colligans Berlese, 1920
- Zercon comaliatus Blaszak, 1978
- Zercon crinitus Berlese, 1920
- Zercon delicatus Urhan & Ekiz, 2002
- Zercon disparipila Athias Henriot, 1961
- Zercon dzobavi Balan & Vinnik, 1993
- Zercon echinatus Schweizer, 1922
- Zercon embersoni Blaszak, 1985
- Zercon encarpatus Athias Henriot, 1961
- Zercon forliensis Sellnick, 1944
- Zercon forsslundi Sellnick, 1958
- Zercon foveolatus Halaskova, 1969
- Zercon fragilis Urhan, 2001
- Zercon franzi (Willmann, 1943)
- Zercon furcatus G. Canestrini & Fanzago, 1876
- Zercon gerhardi Halaskova, 1979
- Zercon gurensis Mihelcic, 1962
- Zercon heilongjiangensis Ma & Yin, 1999
- Zercon hemimbricatus Skorupski & Luxton, 1996
- Zercon henoticus Blaszak, 1979
- Zercon hibericus Mihelcic, 1960
- Zercon hispanicus Sellnick, 1958
- Zercon ignobilis Blaszak, 1979
- Zercon incompletus Balan, 1995
- Zercon indiscretus Blaszak, 1979
- Zercon inornatus Willmann, 1943
- Zercon insperatus Blaszak, 1979
- Zercon italicus Sellnick, 1944
- Zercon jammicus Blaszak, 1979
- Zercon jilinensis Ma, 2003
- Zercon kackaricus Urhan & Ekiz, 2002
- Zercon karadaghiensis Balan, 1992
- Zercon kashmiricus Blaszak, 1979
- Zercon kaszabi Blaszak, 1978
- Zercon kosovina Kontschán, 2006
- Zercon latissimus Sellnick, 1944
- Zercon leitnerae Willmann, 1953
- Zercon lepurus Blaszak, 1979
- Zercon lindrothi Lundqvist & Johnston, 1985
- Zercon mahunkai Blaszak, 1978
- Zercon michejdai Blaszak, 1979
- Zercon moldavicus Calugar, 1997
- Zercon mongolicus Blaszak, 1978
- Zercon montanus Willmann, 1943
- Zercon mucronatus G. Canestrini & Fanzago, 1876
- Zercon navarrensis Moraza, 1989
- Zercon nemoralis Urhan, 2001
- Zercon notabilis Blaszak, 1979
- Zercon ovalis Balan, 1992
- Zercon ozkani Urhan & Ayyildiz, 1993
- Zercon parivus Moraza, 1991
- Zercon perforatulus Berlese, 1904
- Zercon pinicola Halaskova, 1969
- Zercon plumatopilus Athias-Henriot, 1961
- Zercon polonicus Blaszak, 1970
- Zercon ponticus Balan, 1991
- Zercon prasadi Blaszak, 1979
- Zercon quadricavum Urhan, 2001
- Zercon rafaljanus Błaszak & Łaniecka, 2007
- Zercon reticulatus Ramadan, 1997
- Zercon rhoi Valle, 1965
- Zercon rigidus Blaszak, 1979
- Zercon romagniolus Sellnick, 1944
- Zercon rupestrinus Blaszak, 1979
- Zercon salebrosus Blaszak, 1979
- Zercon salmani Urhan, 2002
- Zercon saphenus Blaszak, 1979
- Zercon sarasinorum Schweizer, 1949
- Zercon schrammi Blaszak, 1979
- Zercon secundus Blaszak, 1979
- Zercon separatus Urhan, 2001
- Zercon septemporus Urhan, 2001
- Zercon serenoides Blaszak & Polanska, 1998
- Zercon serenus Halaskova, 1970
- Zercon serratus Urhan, 2001
- Zercon shcherbakae Balan, 1994
- Zercon similis Sellnick, 1958
- Zercon sklari Balan, 1992
- Zercon solenites Haarlov, 1942
- Zercon sonamargus Blaszak, 1979
- Zercon spatulatus Koch, 1839
- Zercon srinagaricus Blaszak, 1979
- Zercon storkani Halaskova, 1969
- Zercon sylvii Solomon, 1982
- Zercon szeptyckii Blaszak, 1976
- Zercon tarpanicus Blaszak, 1979
- Zercon tauricus Balan, 1991
- Zercon trabzonensis Urhan, 1997
- Zercon triangularis C.L.Koch, 1836
- Zercon turcicus Urhan & Ayyildiz, 1993
- Zercon villosus Blaszak & Polanska, 1998
- Zercon wisniewskii Blaszak & Skorupski, 1992
- Zercon xiaoxinganlingensis Ma & Yin, 1999
- Zercon zangherii Sellnick, 1944
- Zercon zelawaiensis Sellnick, 1944
