= Mesozercon =

Scientific classification
- Domain: Eukaryota
- Kingdom: Animalia
- Phylum: Arthropoda
- Subphylum: Chelicerata
- Class: Arachnida
- Order: Mesostigmata
- Family: Zerconidae
- Genus: Mesozercon; Blaszak, 1976
- Species: M. plumatus

Binomial name
- Mesozercon plumatus (Aoki, 1966)

Genus of mites

Mesozercon is a genus of mites in the family Zerconidae. There is at least one described species in Mesozercon, M. plumatus.
