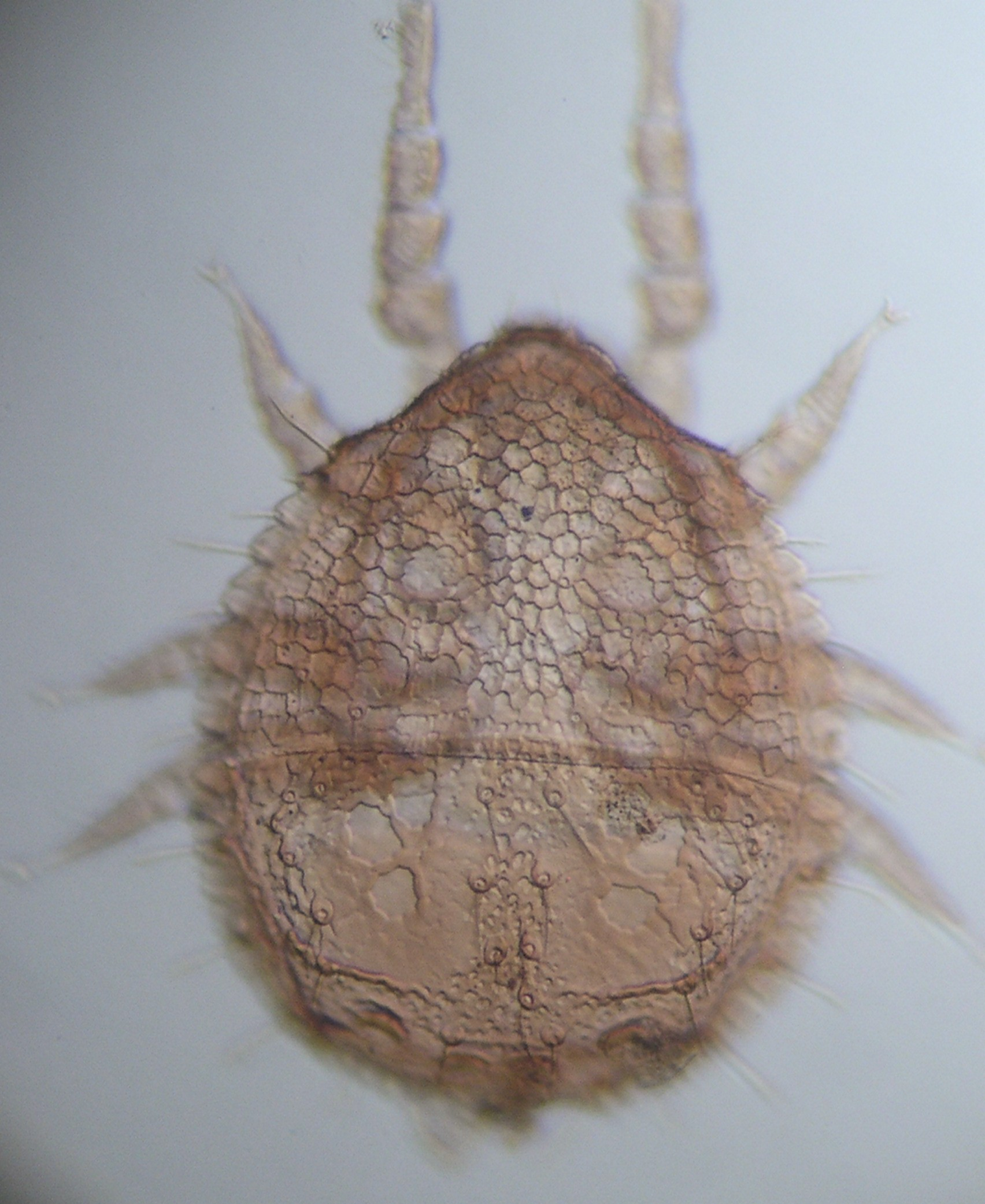
- Prozercon carpathofimbriatus

Scientific classification
- Domain: Eukaryota
- Kingdom: Animalia
- Phylum: Arthropoda
- Subphylum: Chelicerata
- Class: Arachnida
- Order: Mesostigmata
- Family: Zerconidae
- Genus: Prozercon; Sellnick, 1943

= Prozercon =

Genus of mites

Prozercon is a genus of mites in the family Zerconidae. There are more than 20 described species in Prozercon.

== Species ==
These 28 species belong to the genus Prozercon:

- Prozercon achaeanus
- Prozercon aristatus Athias-Henriot, 1961
- Prozercon balikesirensis Urhan, 2008
- Prozercon banazensis Urhan, Karaca & Duran, 2015
- Prozercon bulbiferus Ujvari, 2011
- Prozercon carsticus Halaskova, 1963
- Prozercon davidi
- Prozercon denizliensis Urhan, 2002
- Prozercon dramaensis
- Prozercon erdogani Urhan, 2010
- Prozercon fimbriatus (Koch, 1839)
- Prozercon graecus Ujvari, 2011
- Prozercon karsticus Halaskova, 1963
- Prozercon kochi Sellnick, 1943
- Prozercon kunsti Halaskova, 1963
- Prozercon lutulentus Halaskova, 1963
- Prozercon masani
- Prozercon morazae Ujvari, 2011
- Prozercon norae
- Prozercon plumosus Calugar, 2004
- Prozercon rafalskii Blaszak, 1971
- Prozercon sellnicki Halaskova, 1963
- Prozercon stellifer Aoki, 1964
- Prozercon sultani Duran & Urhan, 2015
- Prozercon traegardhi (Halbert, 1923)
- Prozercon tragardhi Halbert, 1923
- Prozercon usheri Blaszak, 1985
- Prozercon yavuzi Urhan, 1998
