= Amerozercon =

Scientific classification
- Domain: Eukaryota
- Kingdom: Animalia
- Phylum: Arthropoda
- Subphylum: Chelicerata
- Class: Arachnida
- Order: Mesostigmata
- Family: Zerconidae
- Genus: Amerozercon; Halašková, 1969

Genus of mites

Amerozercon is a genus of mites in the family Zerconidae. There are at least four described species in Amerozercon.

== Species ==
These four species belong to the genus Amerozercon:

- Amerozercon annularis Ujvári, 2013
- Amerozercon auricularis Ujvári, 2013
- Amerozercon halaskovae Ujvári, 2013
- Amerozercon penicillatus Ujvári, 2013
