= Mixozercon =

Scientific classification
- Domain: Eukaryota
- Kingdom: Animalia
- Phylum: Arthropoda
- Subphylum: Chelicerata
- Class: Arachnida
- Order: Mesostigmata
- Family: Zerconidae
- Genus: Mixozercon; Halaskova, 1963

Genus of mites

Mixozercon is a genus of mites in the family Zerconidae. There are about six described species in Mixozercon.

== Species ==
These six species belong to the genus Mixozercon:

- Mixozercon albertaensis
- Mixozercon borealis
- Mixozercon heterosetosus Balan, 1995
- Mixozercon jasoniana
- Mixozercon sellnicki (Schweitzer, 1948)
- Mixozercon stellifer Aoki, 1964
