= Wentworth baronets of Parlut (1795) =

Escutcheon of the Wentworth baronets of Parlut

The Wentworth baronetcy, of Parlut in the County of Lincoln, was created in the Baronetage of Great Britain on 16 May 1795 for John Wentworth. Appointed Governor of the Province of New Hampshire in 1766, he was in office there at the time of the American Revolution.

The title became extinct on the death of the 2nd Baronet in 1844.

== Wentworth baronets, of Parlut (1795) ==
- Sir John Wentworth, 1st Baronet (1737–1820)
- Sir Charles Mary Wentworth, 2nd Baronet (1775–1844)

== Notes ==
Baronetage of Great Britain
Preceded by Pollen baronets	Wentworth baronets of Parlut; 16 May 1795	Succeeded by Murray baronets
