= Parazercon =

Scientific classification
- Domain: Eukaryota
- Kingdom: Animalia
- Phylum: Arthropoda
- Subphylum: Chelicerata
- Class: Arachnida
- Order: Mesostigmata
- Family: Zerconidae
- Genus: Parazercon; Trägårdh, 1931

Genus of mites

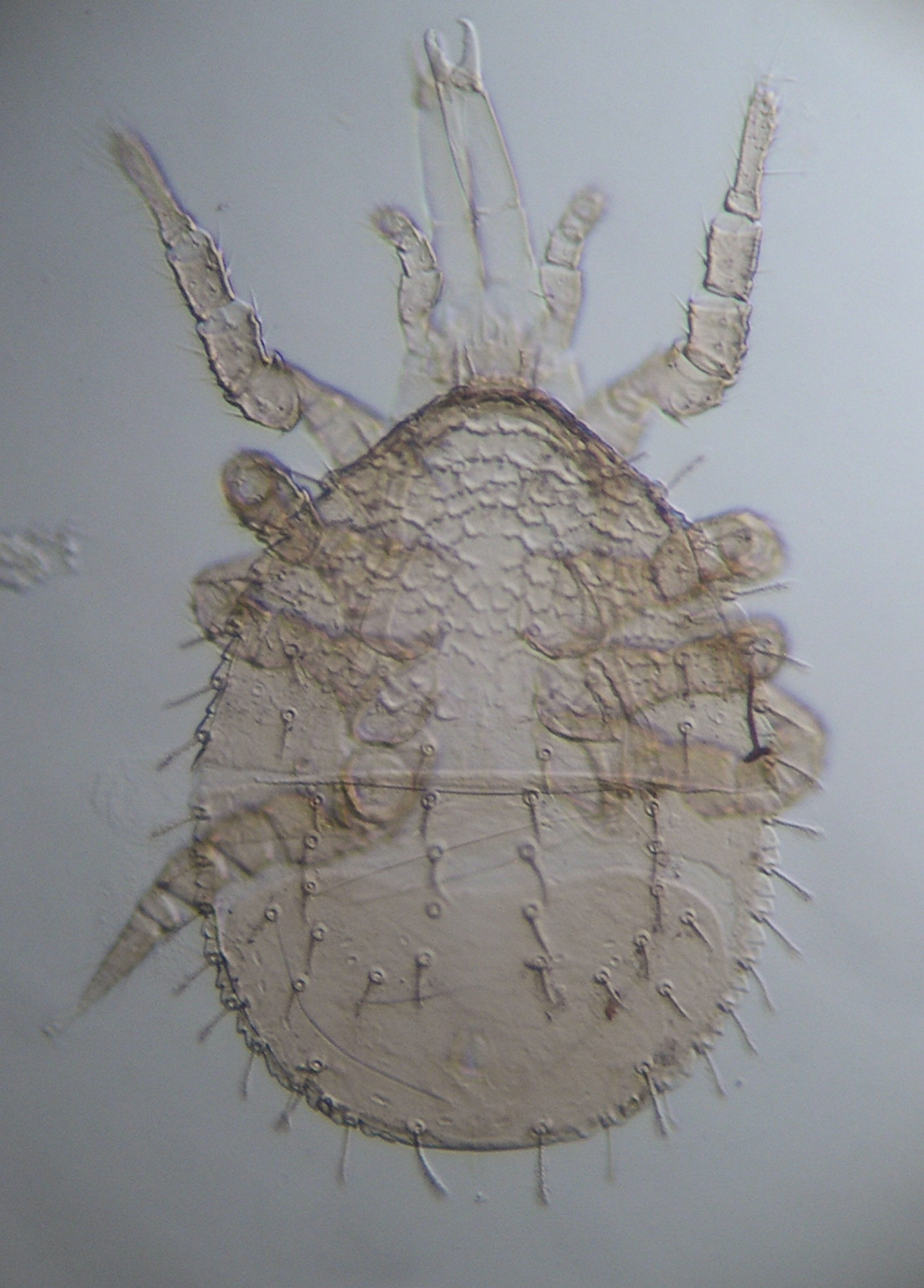
Female Parazercon radiatus

Parazercon is a genus of mites in the family Zerconidae. There are at least four described species in Parazercon.

== Species ==
These four species belong to the genus Parazercon:

- Parazercon belunensis Lombardini, 1962
- Parazercon mirabilis Ujvari, 2011
- Parazercon radiatus (A.Berlese, 1910)
- Parazercon sarekensis C.Willmann, 1939
