= Maria Margaret Pollen =

English writer on lace

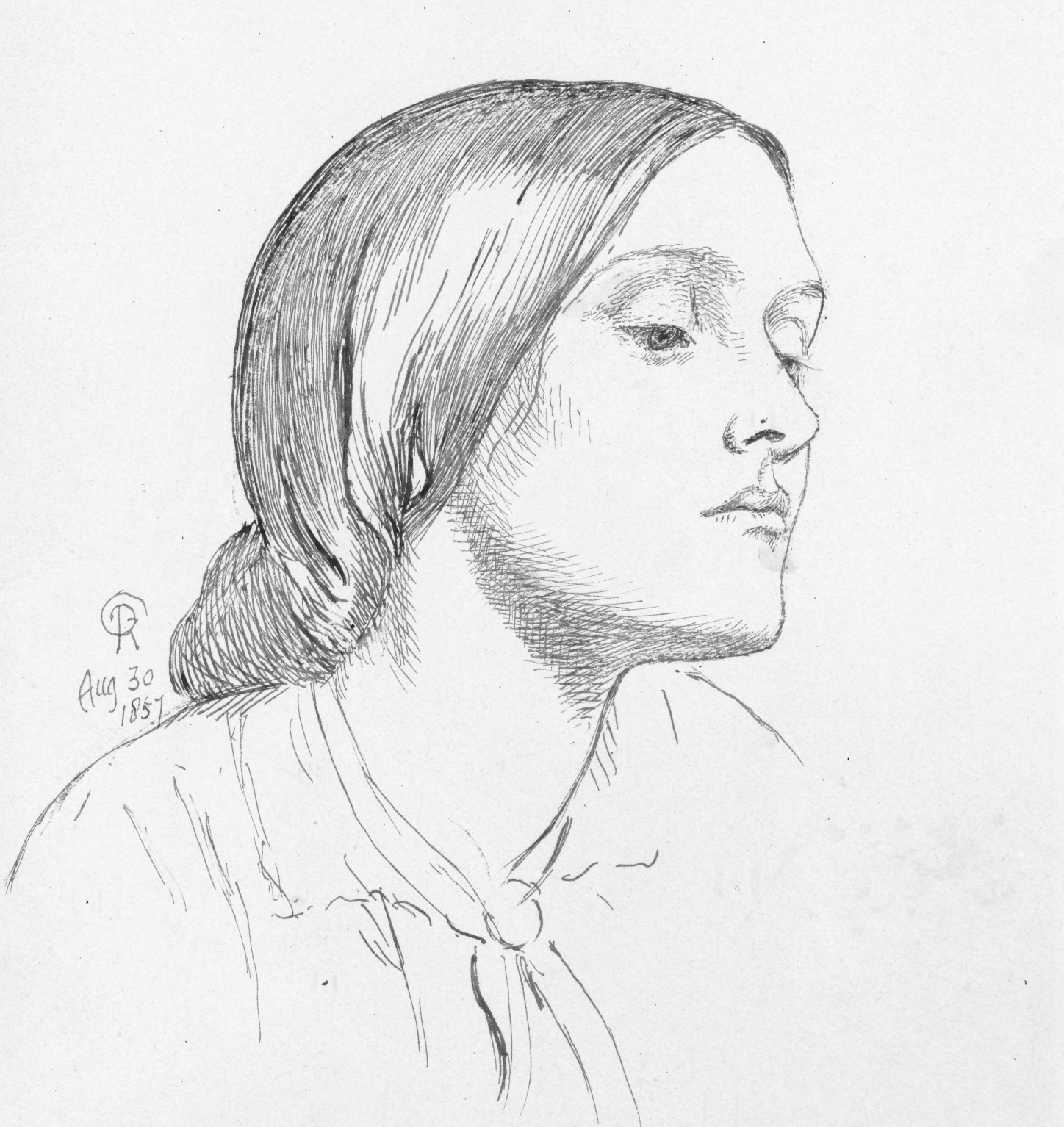
- Portrait of Maria Hungerford Pollen (Dante Gabriel Rossetti, 1857)
- Born: 10 April 1838; Leyton, Essex
- Died: c. 1919
- Known for: Collector and expert on antique lace
- Spouse: John Hungerford Pollen (senior)
- Children: John Hungerford Pollen (Jesuit), Arthur Pollen

Maria Margaret La Primaudaye Pollen (10 April 1838 – c. 1919), known as Minnie, was a decorative arts collector. As Mrs John Hungerford Pollen, she became known during the early-twentieth century as an authority on the history of textiles, publishing Seven Centuries of Lace in 1908.

== Life ==
Maria Margaret La Primaudaye was born into a Huguenot family on 10 April 1838, the third child of the Revd Charles John La Primaudaye, a descendant of Pierre de La Primaudaye. She was educated in Italy. Her family converted to Catholicism in 1851, and it was in Rome that her father met another recent English convert, John Hungerford Pollen, previously an Anglican priest and a decorative artist. She became engaged to Pollen, who was then seventeen years her senior, in the summer of 1854, and was married in the church of Woodchester monastery, near Stroud, Gloucester, on 18 September 1855. The Pollens initially settled in Dublin, where John Hungerford Pollen had been offered the professorship of fine arts at the newly founded University College Dublin, having been introduced to John Henry Newman by Charles La Primaudaye.

In the summer of 1857, the Pollens moved to London, where they became enthusiastic members of the artistic and literary community. A renewed friendship with members of the Pre-Raphaelite Brotherhood led to Pollen's involvement in the decoration of the Oxford Union debating chamber. Dante Gabriel Rossetti, who co-ordinated the project, made a portrait sketch of Maria Margaret Pollen in August 1857.

The Pollens had ten children, among them the Jesuit historian and archivist, John Hungerford Pollen, and the journalist, inventor, and businessman, Arthur Hungerford Pollen. The church architect, Francis Pollen, was a great-grandson.

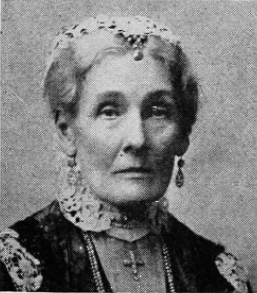
Pollen in 1917

During the 1870s and 1880s, the Pollens rented Newbuildings Place in Shipley, Sussex from Wilfrid Scawen Blunt, a childhood friend of the La Primaudaye family. Blunt's biographer, Elizabeth Longford, suggested that from 1872 he and Maria Margaret Pollen were engaged in a romantic affair. Relations between the two families, which had been unusually intimate, broke down in 1888 when Lady Anne Blunt accused Arthur Pollen of over-familiarity towards her daughter, Judith.

== Collecting ==
Maria Margaret Pollen collected old lace, fans, and eighteenth-century English glass. She attributed her particular interest in textiles to her friend Mrs Bury Palliser, the art writer and lace expert, who gave her one of her first 'specimens' in 1862. Pollen's collections were exhibited during her lifetime at the South Kensington Museum, where her husband was from 1863 Assistant Keeper; the 1908 Franco-British Exhibition; and the 1910 Japan-British Exhibition.

Following the death of her husband in 1902, she had continued to develop their joint interest in decorative art and antique textiles, becoming a lecturer on the subject of old lace. In 1908, she published a history of lace-making, including an illustrated catalogue of 120 pieces in her own collection, entitled Seven Centuries of Old Lace. Based on the study of illuminated manuscripts, Italian fresco paintings, and original research into other examples of old lace in private and ecclesiastical collections, the work was notable for arguing that lace, previously thought to have been an invention of the sixteenth century, could be traced back to antiquity through the ornamentation of linen liturgical vestments.

== Works ==
Seven centuries of lace

- Seven Centuries of Lace, with a preface by Alan S. Cole (London: W. Heinemann, 1908)
- "Lace" in The Catholic Encyclopedia, vol. 8 (New York, 1910), pp. 729–32
- "Early Design in Lace" in The Burlington Magazine for Connoisseurs 19:98 (May 1911)
- "Ancient Lace in the Royal Museums, Brussels" in The Burlington Magazine for Connoisseurs 21:114 (September 1912)
- "Ancient Linen Garments" in The Burlington Magazine for Connoisseurs 25:136 (July 1914)
- Preface to Anne Pollen, John Hungerford Pollen, 1820-1902 (London: John Murray, 1919)
