= Paleozercon =

Paleozercon Temporal range: late Pleistocene

Scientific classification
- Domain: Eukaryota
- Kingdom: Animalia
- Phylum: Arthropoda
- Subphylum: Chelicerata
- Class: Arachnida
- Order: Mesostigmata
- Family: Zerconidae
- Genus: †Paleozercon; Blaszak, Cokendolpher & Polyak, 1995
- Species: †P. cavernicolus

Binomial name
- †Paleozercon cavernicolus Blaszak et al., 1995

Extinct genus of mites

Paleozercon is an extinct genus of mites in the family Zerconidae.

The sole described species is P. cavernicolus. It was the first zerconid species to be recorded from a cave outside of Europe. P. cavernicolus differs from related genera in Zerconidae by lacking a characteristic incision in the peritremal shield and possessing a single pair of setae on the anterior margin of the ventroanal shield. It may have been an oligophagous predator which fed on other mites.
