= Acoesejus =

Scientific classification
- Kingdom: Animalia
- Phylum: Arthropoda
- Subphylum: Chelicerata
- Class: Arachnida
- Order: Mesostigmata
- Family: Zerconidae
- Genus: Acoesejus; Selinick, 1941

Genus of mites

Acoesejus is a genus of mites in the family Zerconidae. It contains a single species, Acoesejus muricatus.
