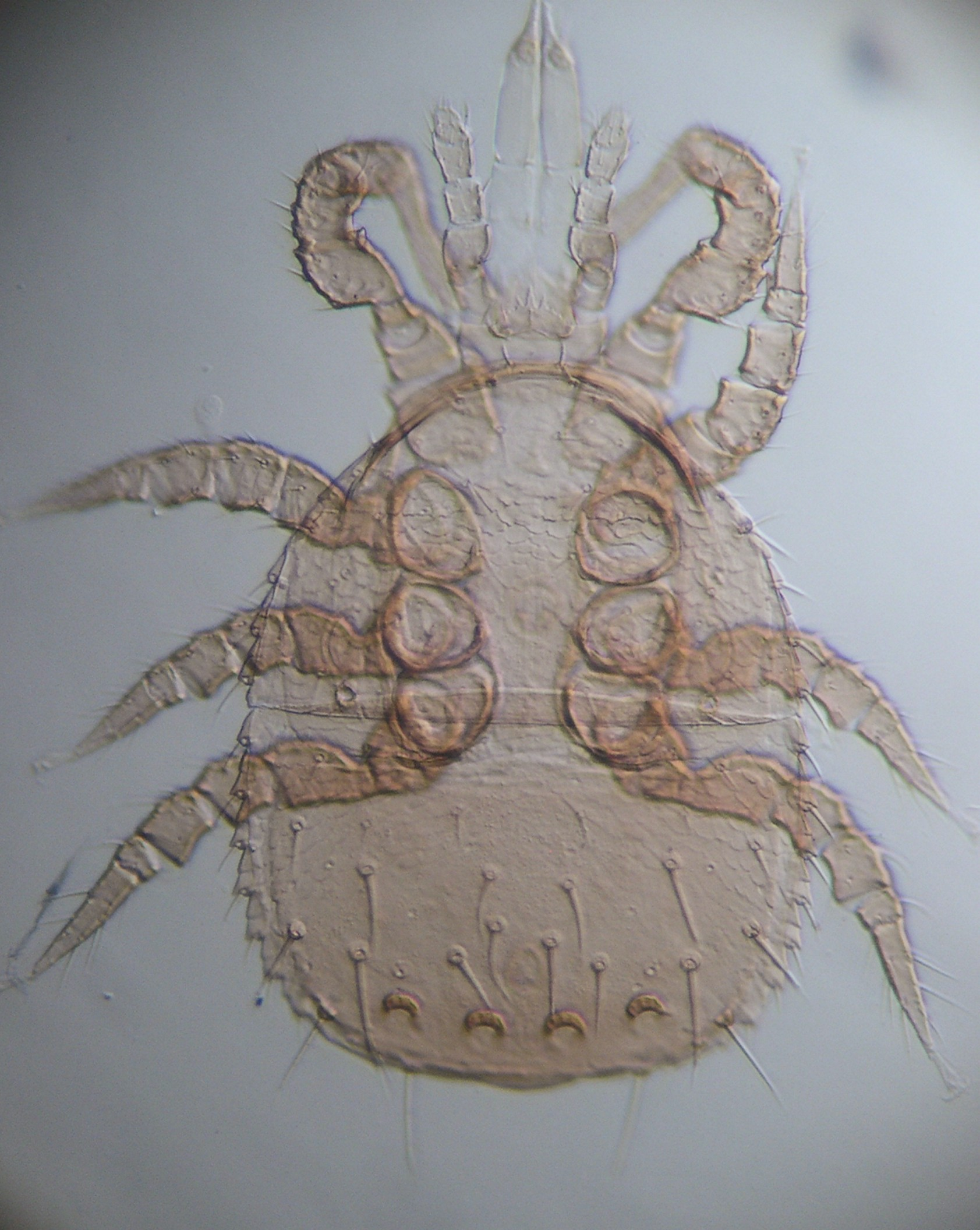
- Zercon gurensis

Scientific classification
- Kingdom: Animalia
- Phylum: Arthropoda
- Subphylum: Chelicerata
- Class: Arachnida
- Order: Mesostigmata
- Family: Zerconidae
- Genus: Zercon; Koch, 1836

= Zercon =

Genus of mites

Zercon is a genus of mites in the family Zerconidae. There are more than 130 described species in Zercon.
