= Metazercon =

Scientific classification
- Domain: Eukaryota
- Kingdom: Animalia
- Phylum: Arthropoda
- Subphylum: Chelicerata
- Class: Arachnida
- Order: Mesostigmata
- Family: Zerconidae
- Genus: Metazercon; Blaszak, 1976

Genus of mites

Metazercon is a genus of mites in the family Zerconidae.
