= Peregrine Pollen =

English auctioneer (1931–2020)

- Born: 24 January 1931; London, England
- Died: 18 February 2020 (aged 89)
- Occupation: Auctioneer
- Employer: Sotheby Parke-Bernet
- Spouse: Patricia Helen Barry (m. 1958; div. 1972) (m. 1978; died 2016)
- Children: 5 (including Arabella Pollen)

Peregrine Michael Hungerford Pollen (24 January 1931 – 18 February 2020) was an English auctioneer who headed Parke-Bernet in the 1960s after it was purchased by Sotheby's. He was known for expanding the auction house in North America, and bringing a dramatic flair to auctions.

== Early life ==
Pollen was born to Walter Michael Hungerford Pollen, a steel industrialist, and Rosalind Frances Pollen née Benson, the daughter of Robert Henry Benson, a well-known London banker, on 24 January 1931. His grand-uncle was George Holford. He attended Eton College and read modern languages at Christ Church, University of Oxford. Pollen then worked as a Latin teacher, an organist in Australia, warehouse worker in Los Angeles, a gasoline attendant, pantry boy on an ocean liner from London to Las Palmas, aluminium worker in Kitimat, British Columbia, and attendant at a psychiatric hospital. He served his national service in the King's Royal Rifle Corps before becoming an aide-de-camp to the Governor of Kenya, Evelyn Baring, from 1955 to 1957.

== Work as auctioneer ==
Pollen first began working for Sotheby's in 1957, rising to become an aide to the company's chairman, Peter Wilson, before he was made the company's first New York City representative in 1960. After the company purchased Parke-Bernet in 1964—at the time the largest auction house in America— he became the head of Sotheby Parke-Bernet. He expanded it throughout North America, opening facilities in Houston, Denver, Los Angeles, Buenos Aires, and São Paulo. He also spearheaded the opening of PB 84, a discount store, in New York City in 1968.

As an auctioneer, he was known for having a dramatic flair. At a 1967 auction of treasure from the 1715 Treasure Fleet, Pollen had a talking macaw brought in and projected images of the fleet on the walls of the auction room. In order to get Impressionist paintings out of Buenos Aires, he once concealed them in a Beatles poster. Pollen later had a caique from South America named Papagoya that accompanied him around the city and was reportedly addicted to alcohol. He oversaw auctions of numerous items, including Helena Rubinstein's collection and treasure salvaged from the 1715 Treasure Fleet. Pollen oversaw a dramatic increase in Parke-Bernet's sales; in 1964 when it was purchased, its sales were $11 million. By 1966, the auction houses' sales were $23.5 million, and $38.5 million by 1970.

In 1972, Pollen became vice-chairman of Sotheby's and returned to England. As the largest private shareholder in the company (with five percent), Pollen was considered the likely successor of Wilson as company chairman until the company began losing money— which many blamed on over-expansion. When Gordon Brunton was made the chairman after Wilson's retirement, Pollen left the company, retiring in 1982.

== Personal life and death ==
In 1958, he married Patricia Helen Barry. They had three children, including Arabella Pollen, before divorcing in 1972 and remarrying in 1978. Patricia Barry died in 2016. He lived in Norton Hall, Gloucestershire where he planted between 6,000 and 8,000 trees, and was a trustee of the Westonbirt Arboretum. Pollen died on 18 February 2020.
