= Arabella Pollen =

English fashion designer, journalist and author

Arabella Pollen (born 22 June 1961) is an English fashion designer and, as Bella Pollen, journalist and author of five novels published between 1997 and 2011.

== Early life ==
Arabella Rosalind Hungerford Pollen, known as Bella Pollen, is the daughter of Peregrine Michael Hungerford Pollen, a former chairman of Sotheby Parke-Bernet auction house, and Patricia Helen Barry. Born in Oxford, she was raised in Manhattan.

== Fashion career ==
In 1981, Pollen founded the eponymous design company Arabella Pollen, described by The Independent as: "designer of crisp, colourful clothes for the young social set". Among her private clients were Diana, Princess of Wales, Margaux Hemingway and Marianne Faithfull. Between 1981 and 1994, the company was nominated for eleven major fashion awards.

In 1984, Arabella Pollen won the contract to design staff uniforms for the newly launched Virgin Atlantic Airways and created suits in the 'Virgin Red' that is still the airline's signature colour. In 1990, Courtaulds acquired a minority share in the company, later increasing this to a majority stake. Arabella Pollen closed in 1994, following Courtaulds' withdrawal. Pollen continued to advise the textile giant as a design consultant.

== Writing career ==
In 1995, Pollen became a writer, working as Bella Pollen. Her third book, Hunting Unicorns, became a best seller in 2004. Midnight Cactus (2007) was sold to Paramount Pictures. Summer of the Bear (2011) was an Oprah summer pick and a Richard and Judy best summer read. Pollen has contributed to numerous magazines and newspapers including The Times, The Daily Telegraph, The Spectator, The Observer and Vogue.

== Personal life ==
Pollen's first marriage was to art dealer Giacomo Dante Algranti in 1985, with whom she had two children, Jesse and Samuel. In 1995, she married David Macmillan, the grandson of former Prime Minister Harold Macmillan, and director of the book publisher, Macmillan Publishers. The couple have two children, Finn and Mabel.

== Bibliography ==
- Meet Me in the In-Between (2018)
- The Summer of the Bear (2011)
- Midnight Cactus (2007)
- Hunting Unicorns (2004)
- B Movies, Blue Love (1999)
- All about Men (1997)

== See also ==
- Pollen Baronets

== External sources ==
- Short profile
- Author website
