= Hawley baronets of Leybourne Grange (1795) =

Escutcheon of the Hawley baronets of Leybourne Grange

The Hawley baronetcy of Leybourne Grange, in the County of Kent, was created in the Baronetage of Great Britain on 14 March 1795, for the landowner Henry Hawley, High Sheriff of Kent in 1783. He was the son of the physician James Hawley (1706–1777) and his wife Elizabeth Banks, daughter of Joseph Banks II and aunt of Sir Joseph Banks.

The 3rd Baronet, who served as High Sheriff of Kent in 1844, was succeeded by his brother. The 5th Baronet was the nephew of the 3rd and 4th Baronets, the son of Henry Charles Hawley, Rector of Leybourne. The 6th Baronet died without issue and was succeeded by his nephew, who was High Sheriff of Lincolnshire in 1962.

The 8th Baronet, who did not use his title, did not formally prove his succession: the title was considered dormant from 1988. The baronetcy became extinct upon his death in 2015.

== Hawley baronets, of Leybourne Grange (1795) ==
Hawley baronets of Leybourne Grange
- Crest: A dexter arm in armour Proper garnished Or holding in the hand a spear in bend sinister point downwards.
- Shield: Vert a saltire engrailed Or.

- Sir Henry Hawley, 1st Baronet (1745–1826)
- Sir Henry Hawley, 2nd Baronet (1776–1831)
- Sir Joseph Henry Hawley, 3rd Baronet (1814–1875)
- Sir Henry James Hawley, 4th Baronet (1815–1898)
- Sir Henry Michael Hawley, 5th Baronet (1848–1909)
- Sir Henry Cusack Wingfield Hawley, 6th Baronet (1876–1923)
- Sir David Henry Hawley, 7th Baronet (1913–1988)
- Sir Henry Nicholas Hawley, 8th Baronet (1939–2015), did not use the title and his name did not appear on the Official Roll of the Baronetage.

== Notes ==
Baronetage of Great Britain
Preceded by Neave baronets	Hawley baronets of Leybourne Grange; 14 May 1795	Succeeded by Pollen baronets
