= Polonez Cup =

The Baltic Single & Double Handed Polonez Cup Race (shortly Polonez Cup) is a Baltic Sea yachting regatta, known as the most difficult single-handed Baltic Sea offshore contest.

The regatta started in 1972 and was usually a yearly event matching solo sailors. However the event was not staged in 1982 and after 1983 went on hiatus. The regatta restarted in 2010.

The regatta is based at Świnoujście on Usedom Island off northern-western Poland and is organized with help from the Polish Maritime Foundation, in the cities of Szczecin and Świnoujście.

== History ==
The initiators of single-handedly racing the Baltic Sea were captains Jerzy Siudy and Kazimierz Jaworski, who in 1973 arranged a "private" race along a Świnoujście–Christiansø–Świnoujście course. They sailed on Taurus yachts. The results remain unknown.

In 1974 the Maritime University of Szczecin established a Yacht Club. The first Commander was Andrzej Jaśkiewicz. The regatta began at the organization's inception. The patron of the regatta was Eugeniusz Daszkowski, Rector of the Maritime University. To commemorate the founding, Krzysztof Baranowski circled the world on the Polonez, which became the name of the Single-Handed Cup. The Coordinator of the first edition of the race was Piotr Stelmarczyk then a Yacht Club employee. Subsequent editions were coordinated by Anthony Brancewicz, who took over as commodore of the club.

The Polonez Cup ran from 1973 until 1983 with a one-year break in 1982. Jaworski and Siudy planned to start the Polonez Regatta was initially held on May 25, the anniversary of Baranowski's entry to Plymouth. In later years the date changed to June and then to August. The Polonez Cup was founded by the Director of Maritime Yacht Shipyard "Leonia Teliga" – Edmund Bak.

In 1977 the race was held for the first time with international participants, whcn Czechoslovak sailor Richard Konkolski from Yacht Club Bohumín, started.

The route remains unchanged: Świnoujście – the passing portside group of islands Christiansø – Świnoujście non-stop.

In 2013, third place went to Jakub Strzyczkowski, a journalist for Polskie Radio Program III.

== Winners ==
Year	Winner	Yacht	Country
1973	Jaworski Kazimierz	Ogar	Poland
1973	Siudy Jerzy	Karfi	Poland
1974	Jaworski Kazimierz	Ogar	Poland
1975	Siudy Jerzy	Karfi	Poland
1976	Góralski Władysław	Ogar	Poland
1977	Jaworski Kazimierz	Spaniel	Poland
1978	Siudy Jerzy	Bumerang	Poland
1979	Gogołkiewicz Czesław	Karfi	Poland
1980	Madeja Jerzy	Umbriaga	Poland
1981	Madeja Jerzy	Umbriaga	Poland
1983	Madeja Jerzy	Umbriaga	Poland
2010	Krygier Krzysztof	Bluefin	Poland
2011	Lewenstein Marek	Kiwi	Poland
2012	Karpiński Maciej	Papillon	Poland
2013	Falk Piotr	BLUESinA	Poland
