= Names of Poland =

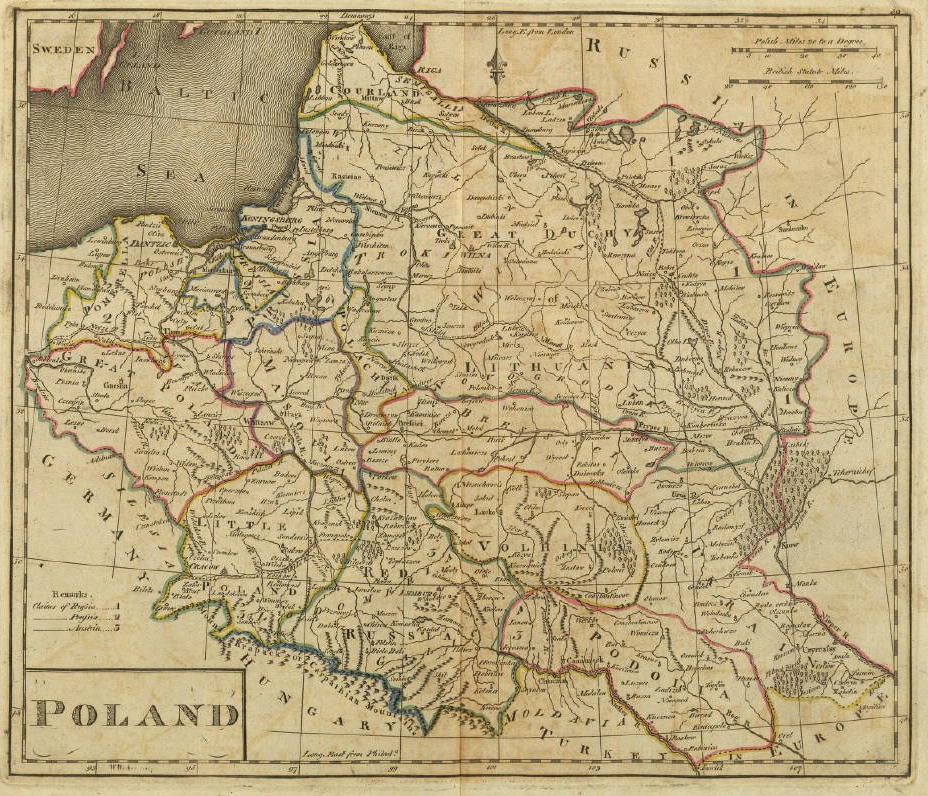
An 18th century map of Polish-Lithuanian Commonwealth labeled as "Poland"

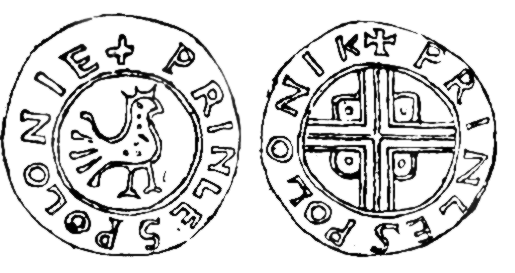
A Denarius from the 11th century with the Latin name "Polonie"

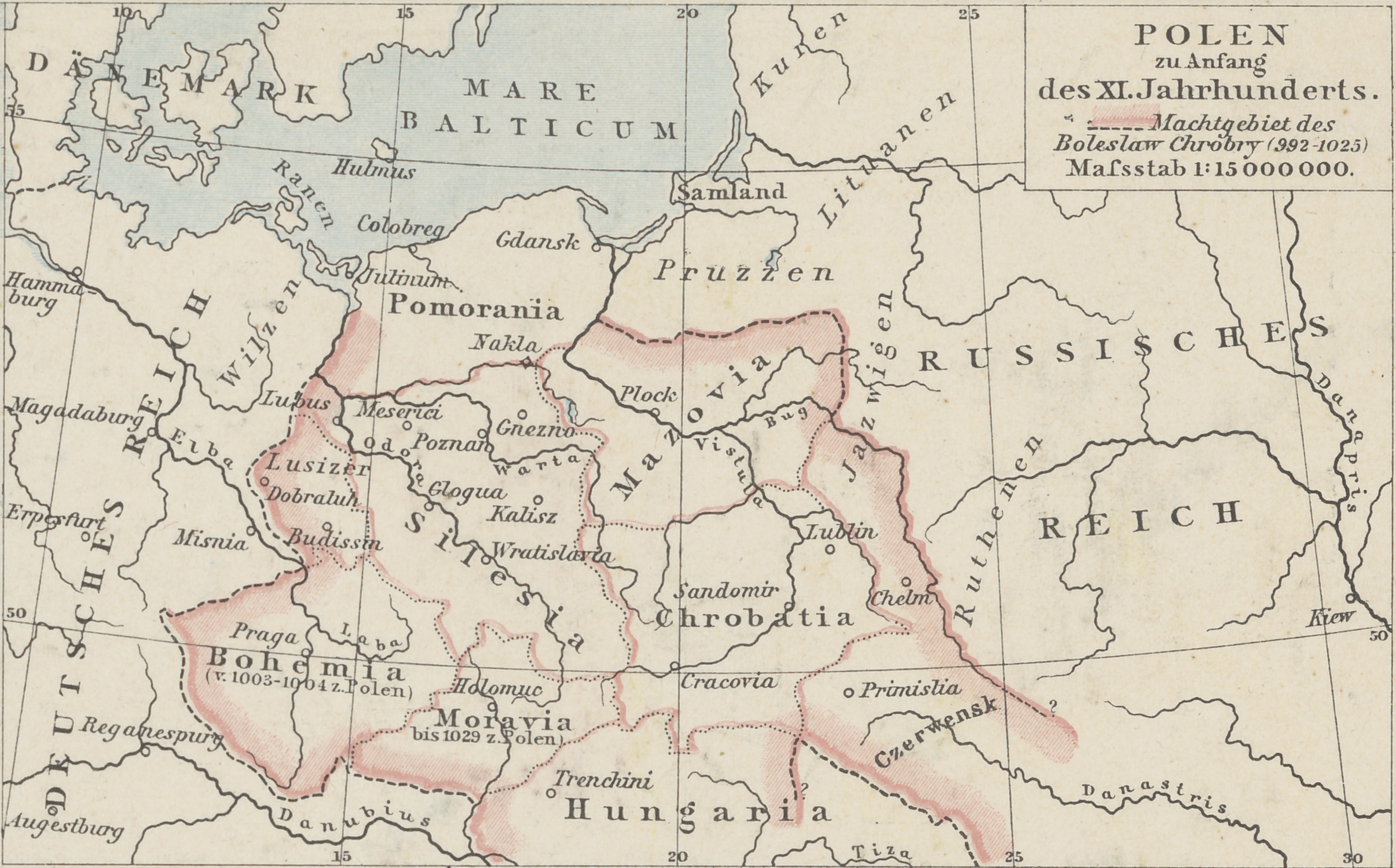
Poland of 11th century under Bolesław I the Brave

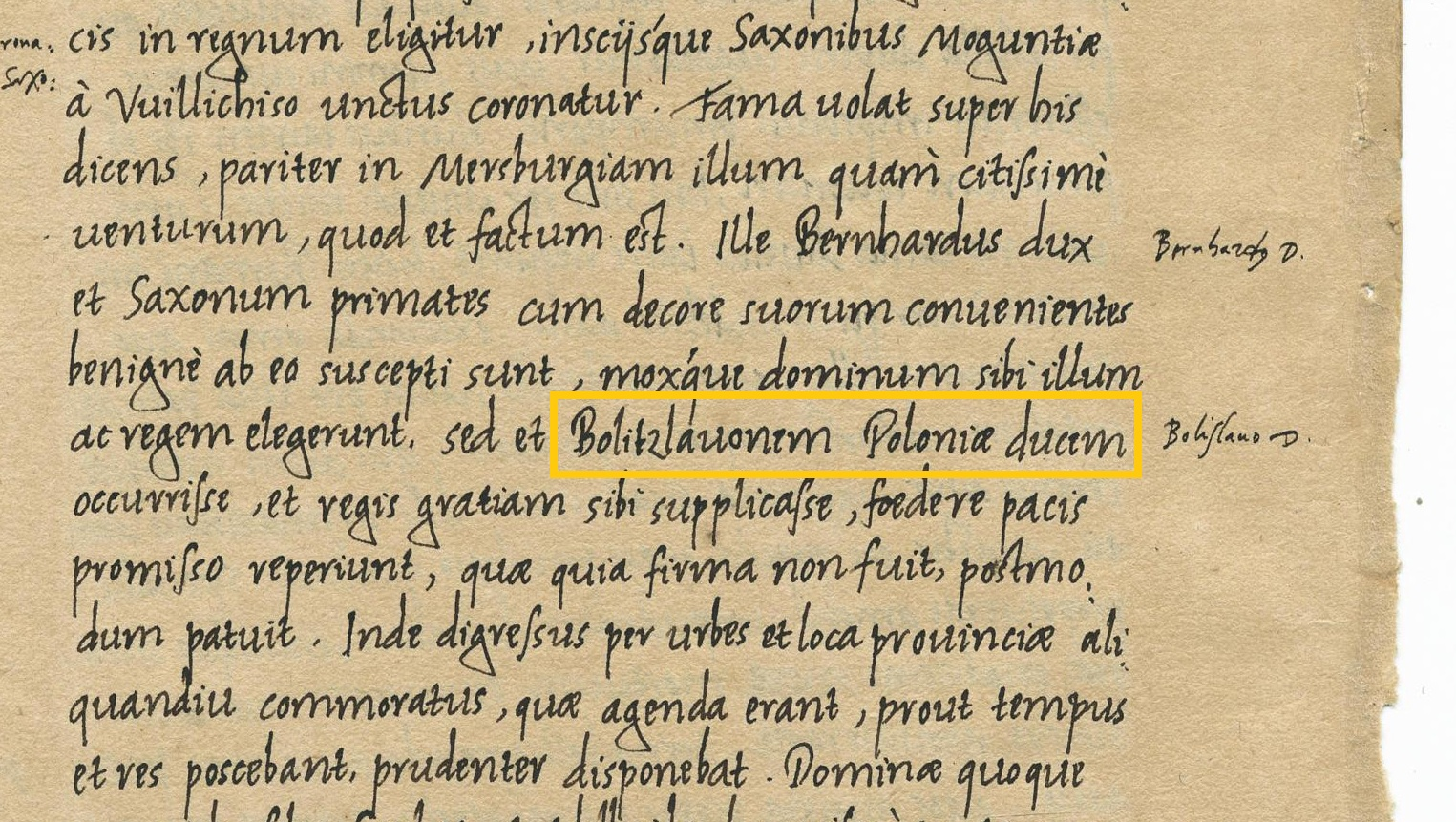
Name "Polonia" in the entry for 1002 in the 11th-century Annals of Quedlinburg, Dresden, Sächsische Landesbibliothek, Q.113, fol 29v

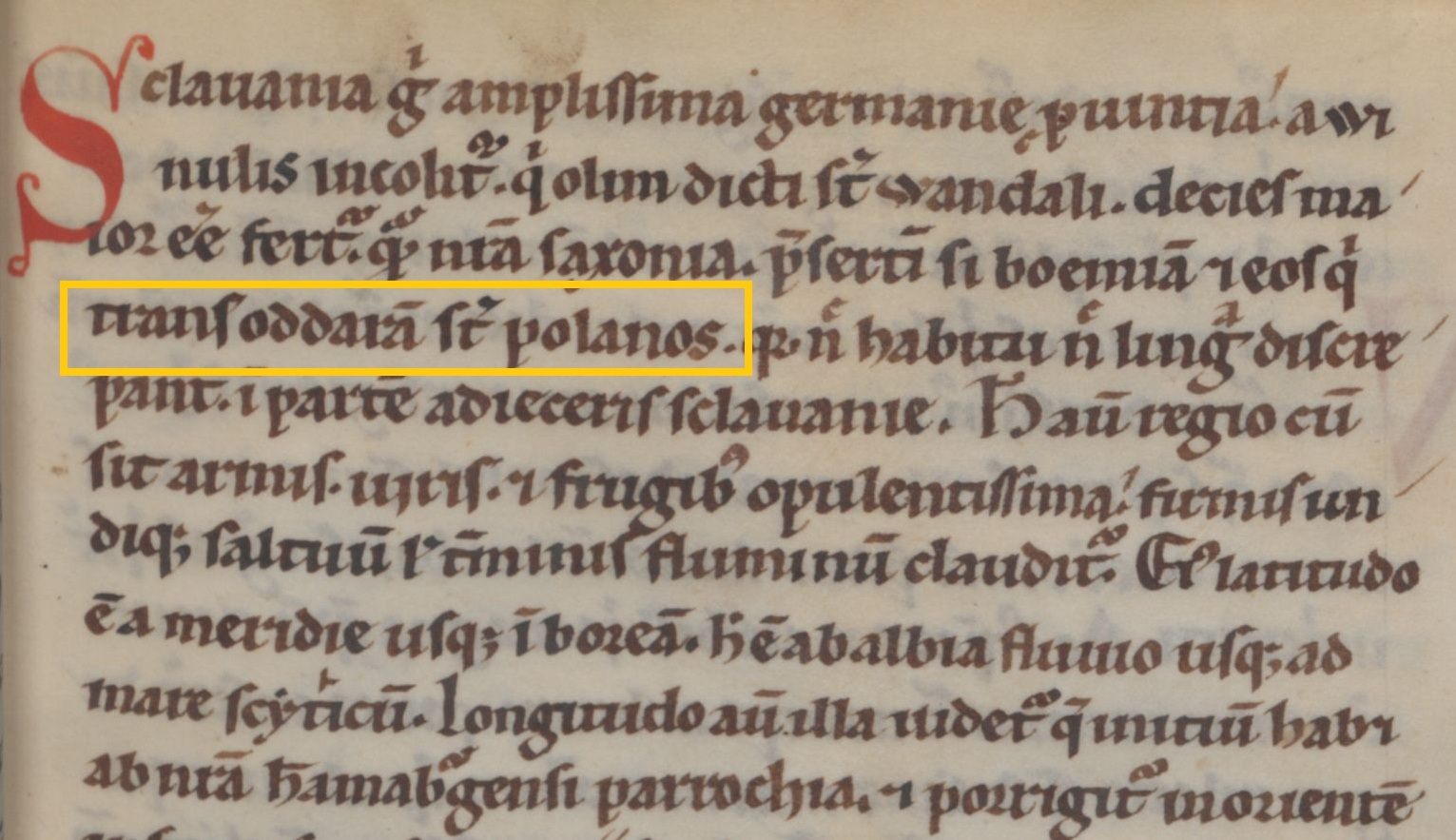
11th century „Gesta Hammaburgensis ecclesiae pontificum Adam of Bremen note Polans "trans Oddaram sunt Polanos"

The ethnonyms for the Poles (people) and Poland (their country) include endonyms (the way Polish people refer to themselves and their country) and exonyms (the way other peoples refer to the Poles and their country). Endonyms and most exonyms for Poles and Poland derive from the name of the West Slavic tribe of Polans (Polanie), while in some languages the exonyms for Poland derive from the name of another tribe – the Lendians (Lędzianie).

== Endonyms ==
The Polish words for a Pole are Polak (masculine) and Polka (feminine), Polki being the plural form for two or more women and Polacy being the plural form for the rest. The adjective "Polish" translates to Polish as polski (masculine), polska (feminine) and polskie (neuter). The common Polish name for Poland is Polska. The latter Polish word is an adjectival form which has developed into a substantive noun, most probably originating in the phrase polska ziemia, meaning "Polish land".

=== Rzeczpospolita ===
The full official name of the Polish state is Rzeczpospolita Polska which translates to "Republic of Poland". The word rzeczpospolita has been used in Poland since at least the 16th century. Originally it was a generic term used to denote any state with a republican or similar form of government. Today, however, the word is used almost solely in reference to the Polish State. Any other republic is referred to as republika in modern Polish.

=== Language roots ===
It is often assumed that all of the above names derive from the name of the Polans (Polanie), a West Slavic tribe which inhabited the territories of present-day Poland in the 9th–10th centuries. The origin of the name Polanie is theorized to be descended ultimately from Proto-Slavic and Proto-Indo-European. It may derive from the word pole, Polish for "field".

Many ancient tribes in Europe derived their names from the nature of the land they inhabited. Gervase of Tilbury wrote in his Otia imperialia ("Recreation for an Emperor", 1211): Inter Alpes Huniae et Oceanum est Polonia, sic dicta in eorum idiomate quasi Campania.(translation: "Between the Hunnic Alps and the Ocean there is Poland, thus called "Countryside" in their idiom.") Polans may have used Polska to describe their own territory in the Warta River basin. During the 10th century, they managed to subdue and unite the Slavic tribes between the rivers Oder and Bug into a single feudal state and in the early 11th century, the name Polska was extended to the entire ethnically Polish territory. The lands originally inhabited by the Polans became known as Staropolska, or "Old Poland", and later as Wielkopolska, or "Greater Poland", while the lands conquered towards the end of the 10th century, home of the Vistulans (Wiślanie) and the Lendians, became known as Małopolska, or "Lesser Poland."

In Polish literature, Poland is sometimes referred to as Lechia, derived from Lech, the legendary founder of Poland. In the 17th–18th centuries, Sarmaci ("Sarmatians") was a popular name by which Polish nobles referred to themselves (see Sarmatism).

=== "Poland" in European literary sources ===
The earliest recorded mention of the adjective "Polish" is found in a Latin text written in 1003 and titled "Annales Hildesheimenses": "Heinricus Berthaldi comitis filius, et Bruno frater regis, et ambo Bolizavones, Polianicus vide licet ac Boemicus, a rege infideliter maiestatis rei deficient." In English: Henry, son of Berthold, and Bruno, brother of the king, and both Boleslaws, Polish and Czech, left the circle of friends of the Emperor. Polonia is first found in the Annales Quedlinburgensis, in the entry for 1002: Sed et Bolitzlavonem Poloniae ducem occurrisse et regis gratiam sibi supplicasse foedere pacis promisso reperiunt, quae quia firma non fuit, postmodum patuit (But they also find that Boleslaw, Duke of Poland, had met and begged the king's favor, promising a treaty of peace, which, since it was not firm, was later revoked).

== Lechia ==
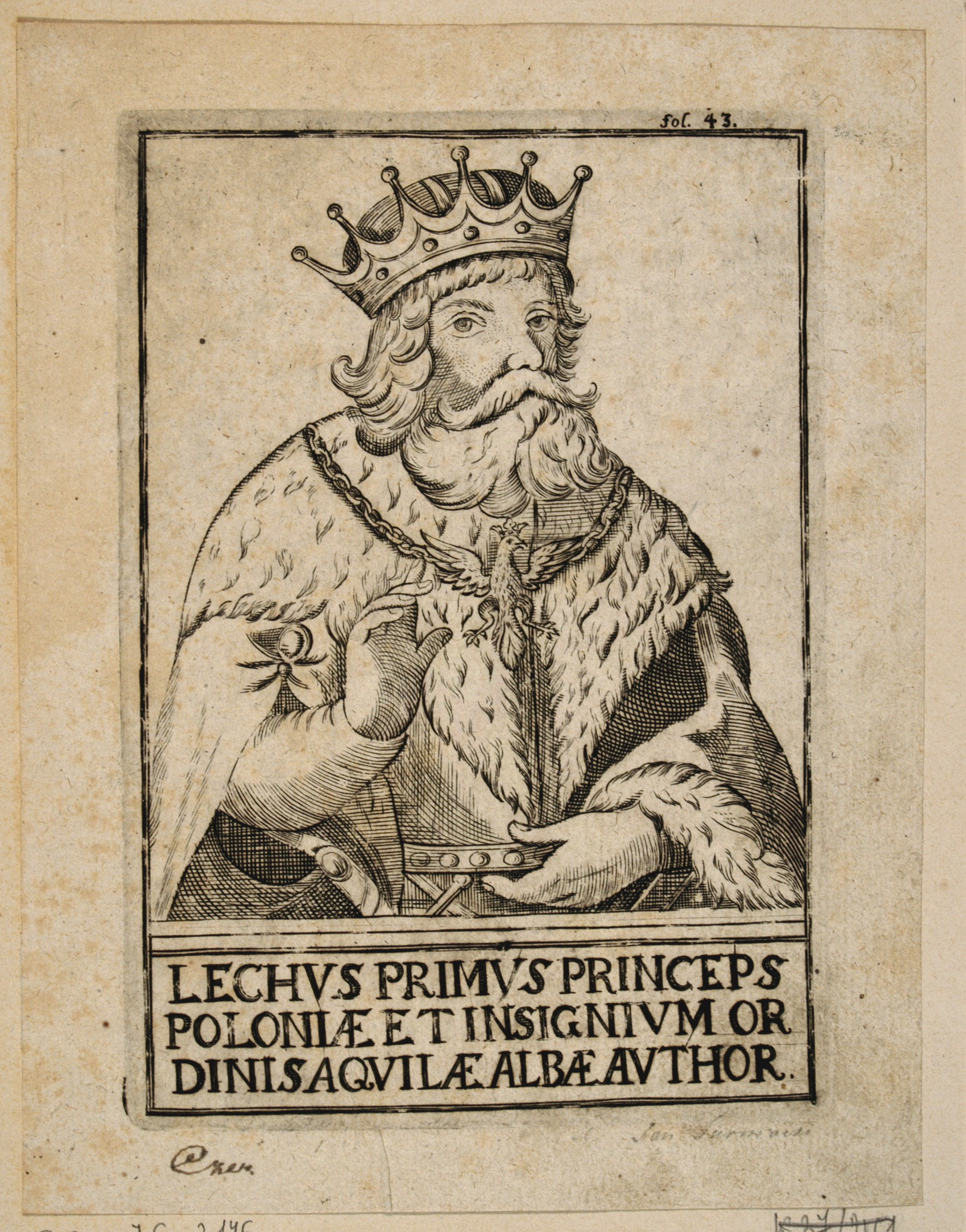
Depiction of the legendary ruler Lech, with the description: "Lech the first prince of Poland"

Lechia is an ancient name of Poland, stemming from the legendary founder and supposed ruler, Lech (a common first name today). The root syllable survives in several European languages and in some Central Asian and Middle Eastern names designating Poland, for example:

- Lenkija in Lithuanian
- Lehia in Romanian (archaic, replaced by Polonia)
- Lengyelország in Hungarian
- Լեհաստան "Lehastan" in Armenian
- Lehistan in Ottoman Turkish, Gagauz, Kumyk, and Crimean Tatar
- Ləhistan/Löhüstan (لهستان) in Middle Azerbaijani and Qashqai
- Лихѧна, Lixęna in Church Slavonic
- Лахьыбзэ, Laḥəbză in Kabardian
- Лаҳистон, Lahiston in Tajik
- Lahistān/Lahestān (لهستان) in Persian and Urdu
- Λεχία, Lechía in Greek
- Läxstan in Tatar, Bashkir and Siberian Tatar
- Liachistan, Liachija, Lech Jer, Liach, Liach Bijligi in Karaim

Similar names were used in older languages, such as:

- Lechitarum in Latin
- Leasir in Old Norse

Several Polish sports organizations have adopted the name Lechia. The best-known example is Lechia Gdańsk. Other examples include Lechia Lwów and Lechia Zielona Góra. In the People's Republic of Poland, the Nivea branch located in Poznań was named the Pollena-Lechia Cosmetics Factory (Fabryka Kosmetyków Pollena-Lechia).

== Exonyms ==
Variations of the country endonym Polska became exonyms in other languages.

=== In Slavic languages ===
Exonyms for Poland in Slavic languages. The West Slavic languages such as Czech and Slovak bear particular resemblance to the Polish endonym:

- Kashubian Pòlskô
- Czech Polsko
- Slovak Poľsko
- Serbo-Croatian: Пољска / Poljska
- Slovene Poljska
- Belarusian Польшча, Pol'shcha
- Ukrainian Польща, Pol'shcha
- Russian Польша, Pol'sha
- Bulgarian Полша, Polsha
- Macedonian Полска, Polska

Non-Slavic languages which borrowed their word for Poland from Slavic include:

- Abkhaz Польша, Ṗol’ša
- Azerbaijani, Gagauz Polşa
- Bashkir, Kazakh, Kyrgyz, Tatar, Turkmen Польша, Polşa
- North Korean standard language 뽈스까 Ppolsŭkka
- Uzbek Польша, Polsha
- Uyghur پولشا, Polsha

=== In Romance languages ===
In Latin, which was the principal written language of the Middle Ages, the exonym for Poland became Polonia. It later became the basis for Poland's name in all Romance languages:

- Catalan Polònia
- Occitan Polonha
- French Pologne
- Italian, Galician, Romanian, Spanish Polonia
- Portuguese Polónia (European) / Polônia (Brazilian)

Many other languages (e.g. Albanian Polonia; Arabic بولونيا Būlūniyā; Greek Πολωνία, Polōnía; Maltese Polonja) use a variation of the Latin name.

In Romanian, the current names used for Poles are neologisms polonezi and, less frequently, poloni, while the country is called Polonia. However, historically, the people were called by other names: poleci (sg. poleac) or leși/lehi/leahi (with singular forms leah, leav, leaf or leș). The latter forms are derived from the same source as Lechia, via Ukrainian. The name of Poland used in chronicles was Țara Leșască, literally "the Polish country".

=== In Germanic languages ===
Germans, Poland's western neighbors, called it Polen. Other Germanic languages use related exonyms:

- Dutch, Danish, Swedish, Norwegian Polen
- English Poland
- Icelandic, Pólland, Sléttumannaland (old translation: land of the plain dwellers), Pólínaland (old)
- Faroese Pólland
- Yiddish פּױלן, Poyln

Non-Germanic languages which borrowed their word for Poland from Germanic include:

- Arabic بولندا, Būlandā
- Esperanto Pollando, Polio / Polujo
- Hebrew פּוֹלִין, Polín (Older pronunciation: פּוֹלִין Pólin and פּוֹלַנְיָה Polánia)
- Indonesian Polandia
- Irish An Pholainn
- Japanese ポーランド, Pōrando
- Chinese 波兰 (simplified) or 波蘭 (traditional), Bōlán
- South Korean standard language 폴란드, Pollandeu
- Vietnamese Ba Lan (波蘭)

=== Other ===
The Lendians, a Proto-Polish tribe who lived around the confluence of the rivers Vistula and San (south-eastern Poland), are the source of another exonym. The tribe's name likely comes from the Proto-Polish word lęda, or "scorched land". Their name was borrowed to refer to Poland mainly by peoples who lived east or south of Poland:

- лях (lyakh) is used in East Slavic languages. It also appears in Polish literature as Lachy, a synonym for "Poles" and "Poland" used by East Slavic characters. Podlasie, a Polish region on the Belarusian border, derives its name from the same root. Lachy Sądeckie is the name of a small cultural group around Nowy Sącz in southern Lesser Poland.
- Lithuanian Lenkija
- Hungarian Lengyelország
- Persian لهستان, Lahestān. The word combines Lah with a common Persian suffix -stān, which means "The land of".
- Turkish Lehistan, a borrowing from Persian. It is now considered obsolete and replaced by Polonya.
- Armenian Լեհաստան, Lehastan was also borrowed from Persian.

== Related words ==
Some common English words, as well as scientific nomenclature, derive from exonyms of Poland in various languages.

- Alla polacca, like a polonaise (in musical notation); Italian for "Polish style"
- Polacca, a type of 17th-century sailing vessel
- Polka, a dance and genre of dance music originally from Bohemia; Czech (also Polish) "Pole" (feminine)
- Polonaise, several meanings including a dance of Polish origin; from French polonaise, "Polish" (feminine)
- Pologne, several meanings including Polish Haitians, from French name for Poland
- 1112 Polonia, an asteroid; from Latin Polonia, "Poland"
- Polonium, a chemical element; from Latin Polonia
- Polska, a dance of Swedish origin; from Swedish polska, "Polish"
- Poulaines, a type of shoes popular in the 15th century in Europe; from Old French polain, "Polish"
- Polonia, the term to describe people of Polish origin living outside of Poland and in other countries.

== See also ==
- Lech, Czech and Rus
- Civitas Schinesghe
- Endonym and exonym
- Lechitic languages
- Lechites
- List of country name etymologies
- Polish names
- Polish tribes
- Polonia (disambiguation)
