= Polonaise (disambiguation) =

A polonaise (French: [pɔlɔnɛz])) is a stately dance of Polish origin or a piece of music for this dance.

Polonaise may also refer to:

- Polonaises (Chopin), compositions by Frédéric Chopin
  - Polonaise in A-flat major, Op. 53 (French: Polonaise héroïque, Heroic Polonaise; Polish: Polonez Heroiczny)
- Polonaise (clothing), a woman's garment popular in late-18th-century Europe
- Polonaise (film) (or Leedvermaak), a 1989 Dutch drama film directed by Frans Weisz
- Polonaise (sauce), a garnish made of melted butter, breadcrumbs and herbs
- Polonaise (vodka), a Polish brand of vodka
- Polonaise nightclub in Manhattan, Caesar (cocktail) origin
- Lit à la polonaise, a type of richly decorated canopy bed

== Polonez ==
- Polonez (multiple rocket launcher), Belarusian 300 mm rocket artillery system
- Polonez Cove, a headland in the South Shetland Islands, Antarctica
- Polonez Cup, a Baltic Sea yachting regatta
- FSO Polonez, a Polish automobile

== See also ==
- Polonezköy, a neighborhood of Istanbul, Turkey
  - Polonezköy Nature Park
- Polonozercon, a genus of mites in the family Zerconidae
- Polonisation, acquisition or imposition of elements of Polish culture
