= Arthur Pollen =

English journalist (1866–1937)

Arthur Joseph Hungerford Pollen
- Born: September 13, 1866
- Died: January 28, 1937 (aged 70)
- Education: The Oratory School, Birmingham
- Alma mater: Trinity College, Oxford
- Occupations: Journalist; businessman; naval commentator, inventor
- Employer(s): Linotype & Machinery Co. Ltd, Birmingham Small Arms Company
- Organization: Argo Company
- Known for: Argo Clock fire-control system
- Notable work: "The Navy in Battle" (1918)
- Political party: Liberal
- Spouse: Maud Beatrice Lawrence (m. 1898)
- Children: 3
- Parents: John Hungerford Pollen (father); Maria Margaret Pollen (mother)

Arthur Joseph Hungerford Pollen (13 September 1866 – 28 January 1937) was an English journalist, businessman, and commentator on naval affairs who devised a new computerised fire-control system for use on battleships prior to the First World War. His most important technical innovation was one of the world's first electrically-powered analogue computers, patented as the Argo Clock: a differential analyser which enabled big guns to engage with long-range targets when both ships were moving at speed in different directions.

== Early life ==
Pollen was born on 13 September 1866, the sixth son and eighth child of eight sons and two daughters born to John Hungerford Pollen and Maria Margaret Pollen. His father being a leading convert to Catholicism along with Cardinal Newman, Arthur was educated at the school which the latter founded in Birmingham, The Oratory School (1878–1884). He then went up to read Modern History at Trinity College, Oxford where he gained a second-class degree in 1888. In 1893 he was called to the bar at Lincoln's Inn. He then took an interest in parliamentary politics, standing as Liberal candidate for the Walthamstow Division of Essex in the General Election of 1895 which he lost; his 4,523 votes to the 6,876 of his opponent, Edmund Widdrington Byrne, MP, QC. After this setback he continued to speak at Liberal Party events, but declined to stand in the by-election brought about by Byrne's resignation in 1897.

On 7 September 1898 he married Maud Beatrice, the only daughter of the leading Conservative politician Joseph Lawrence, (later Sir Joseph Lawrence, Bart.) who was also chairman of Linotype & Machinery Co. Ltd. With Maud he had one daughter, who died aged four, and two sons. In 1898 Pollen was made the managing-director of Linotype, which he ran successfully for the next decade.

== Fire control ==
Through a relative, Commander William Goodenough, Pollen saw a naval gunnery practice near Malta in 1900, and the accuracy was so poor that even at ranges of less than a mile the big guns could not reliably hit their targets. On the board of the Linotype Company at the time was Lord Kelvin, widely regarded as Britain's leading scientist. It was Kelvin who proposed using an analogue computer to solve the equations which arise from the relative motion of the ships engaged in the battle and the time delay in the flight of the shell to calculate the required trajectory and therefore the direction and elevation of the guns. Kelvin's brother James Thomson was responsible for producing a tidal analyser using a ball, disc and cylinder differential analyser which was the original source of the suggested analogue computer.

However first accurate data is needed of the target's position and relative motion. Pollen developed a plotting unit (or plotter) to capture this data. He added a gyroscope to allow for the yaw of the firing ship. Again this required substantial development of the, at the time, primitive gyroscope to provide continuous reliable correction. Pollen used the resources of Linotype for his work, specifically the services of a designer named Harold Isherwood. Trials were carried out in 1905 and 1906, which although completely unsuccessful showed promise. To further the development of fire control, Pollen set up in 1909 the Argo Company, and in 1911 took a holding in the firm of Thomas Cooke & Sons of York, who had been manufacturing components for his equipment.

Early on Pollen was encouraged in his efforts by the rapidly rising figure of Admiral Jackie Fisher, Admiral Arthur Wilson and the Director of Naval Ordnance and Torpedoes (DNO), John Jellicoe. Many officers in the navy were naturally interested in the prospect of being able to have ranges calculated for them so that they could achieve a greater rate of hits against the enemy. In early 1906, while presenting his planned "Aim Correction" system to naval officers, he met for the second time a promising gunnery lieutenant, Frederic Dreyer. The nature of Pollen's work involved close cooperation with the Navy, and upon Dreyer's appointment as Assistant to the DNO with responsibility for fire-control he was invited to view Pollen's Linotype works at Broadheath, near Altrincham. Pollen had had a long relationship with Dreyer's predecessor, Lieutenant Harding.

Pollen continued his work, with tests carried out on Royal Navy warships intermittently. Equipment was repeatedly purchased, despite the misgivings of successive DNOs Reginald Bacon and Gordon Moore.

Dreyer began producing his own fire-control computer. The fundamental difference between the systems was that the Dreyer system was a "dual rate" approach that plotted ranges and bearings separately, versus time rather than using a single rangefinder to take both ranges and bearings to drive the drawing of a plan view of own and target ships, as in the Argo system. The systems differed in other particulars.

The single prototype Dreyer Fire Control Table (called simply "the Original") did not include a gyroscope, though the first adopted for service in 1912—the Mark III—did. Conversely, the automatic plotting of rangefinder readings on the Original Dreyer table and early service examples was later discarded in favour of manual plotting keyboards which were capable of plotting the data of multiple rangefinders. Dreyer played a key role within the Admiralty in deciding which system to use, and always chose his own.

Certain aspects of the Dreyer Table Mk III were found by a subsequent Royal Commission to be similar to Pollen's work and £30,000 compensation was paid to Pollen in 1926 based on a theoretical number of his Argo units which might have been fitted in Royal Navy ships, most of which were never constructed. Pollen's supporters have argued that the poor performance of Naval gunnery at the Battle of Jutland and at Gallipoli was due to the shortcomings of the Dreyer system, but others cite the tactics of the commander of the British battlecruisers, Vice-Admiral David Beatty.

== Journalism ==
At the outbreak of World War I Pollen's relationship with the Admiralty had broken down to the extent that he had been removed from the list of recognised naval contractors. The war also interrupted negotiations which had begun with foreign navies aimed at selling the Argo system to them. Some units had been purchased by Russia before the outbreak of war and some more were sold but no other countries purchased units. Pollen was thus under-employed. He wrote to a friend, Alfred Spender, editor of the Westminster Gazette, asking whether he would be interested in articles about the naval war. Spender agreed. In April 1915 he accepted a post as a feature writer for Land and Water, making this a full-time employment rather just supplying one weekly article. His task was made easier by his good relations with various naval officers he had met as part of his work on the Argo AC system. He remained in contact with James Masterton-Smith, Private secretary to the First Lord of the Admiralty, and with William Reginald Hall, who had been impressed by tests conducted on his ship, HMS Natal, and was appointed Director of Naval Intelligence shortly after the start of the war. Hall commented on the usefulness to him of a responsive journalist, should he need to present a story to the public. Pollen also embarked on a career as a lecturer, speaking at public meetings about naval affairs.

After news of the Battle of Jutland broke in Britain, based on German reports of victory Pollen attempted to redress the shortcomings of official reports issued by the Admiralty. A terse statement of facts known to them, had invited the worst possible interpretation of events. Writing for the 'Westminster Gazette' he attempted to stress the strategic result of the engagement, that the German fleet had fled from the Grand Fleet. Pollen also tried to persuade other reporters to take this line. This response to the news was in contrast to many other leading newspapers, which only belatedly began to regard the battle as a victory. Pollen was generally supportive of the establishment and the Admiralty but on occasion he disagreed publicly with their handling of the war. Commentators, such as Winston Churchill had written articles observing that British supremacy at sea was secured by the dominance of the British fleet over the German, even though no battle had been fought. This was in accord with theories of sea power, such as advocated by Alfred Thayer Mahan. Pollen argued that the cost in this case of the unresolved conflict was that Germany retained significant control of the Baltic Sea and tied up the larger part of the British fleet patrolling the North Sea. The fleet might otherwise have been used combating submarine attacks.

In April 1917 Pollen wrote an article in Land and water critical of the way the war against submarine attacks was being conducted and against failures in administrative organisation of the Admiralty. This was followed by another article of 3 May arguing Britain had lost control of the seas in the face of mounting losses of merchant shipping to submarines, which was suppressed by the official censor. Reaction to the censorship of a respected columnist inevitably led to greater publicity of the issue than if the article had been published and its contents became known. The Admiralty had resisted introducing a convoy system for merchant ships for some time, believing it was impractical and that too few naval vessels were available as escorts. By the end of April the Admiralty had agreed to start forming ships into convoys, although it remains a source of debate to what extent this was a result of public pressure, the direct intervention of the prime minister, David Lloyd George or the natural result of convoy trials already being conducted. Although there was great concern at mounting shipping losses and shortages of materials and food, it also remains unclear to what extent the situation was sufficiently critical to have affected Britain's ability to conduct the war.

In June 1917 Pollen embarked on a visit to America to discuss possible sales of Argo systems. He was approached by John Buchan, Director of Propaganda in the British Foreign Office, asking that he could publicise the work of the navy while there and encourage the development of the American navy. Pollen sought to address a perception amongst Americans that the British fleet had failed to defeat the German fleet, or resolve the submarine issue, thus leaving American ships open to attack. It was felt that his position as a critic of British policy added to his credibility when defending it. The success of his visit led to an offer by the British government of a knighthood and salary, should he return to America and continue a propaganda campaign. Pollen declined, arguing that he would be received entirely differently if acting in an official capacity than as an independent commentator.

=== Jutland and Jellicoe ===
Pollen became extremely critical of the actions of the British Grand Fleet, in particular as commanded by Jellicoe. Ethel Beatty, wife of Admiral Beatty, made a point of becoming friendly with Pollen in May 1917. Pollen declared to her that he intended to have Jellicoe removed from his post as First Sea Lord within a month, and proceeded with a campaign seeking to impress his views upon anyone he could get to listen. Pollen later wrote a book about the Battle of Jutland which argued that any positive actions credited to Jellicoe must have been the work of Admiral Beatty ("The Navy in Battle", 1918). The book was described by the author of the official report on Jutland as a work which "teems with inaccuracies", and by Jellicoe's biographers as "full of errors", and "almost unreadable". Jellicoe wrote to a friend in 1921: "It fell to me to turn down his inventions on more than one occasion".

== Post-War ==
After World War I the Argo company had effectively ceased trading, and interest in naval journalism declined. Pollen had continued as a part-time director of Linotype and now joined the board of the Birmingham Small Arms Company (BSA). He became an active member of the Council of the Federation of British Industries and became its vice-president. He became chairman of the British Commonwealth Union and espoused the role of the entrepreneur in growth of industry, campaigning against the growth of socialism. In 1926 the post of managing director of Linotype became vacant, and he returned to it, hiring one of the first management consultants, T. Gerald Rose, to help reorganise the company. He was invited to become chairman of BSA, but declined, not having sufficient time to manage two companies. In 1936 he was part of a group of Catholics who acquired the Catholic magazine, The Tablet, and served as its chairman for a year while its fortunes were restored.

== Bibliography ==
- Brooks, John (2006). Dreadnought Gunnery and the Battle of Jutland – The Question of Fire Control. Routledge. ISBN 0-7146-5702-6.
- Brooks, John (2005). "Re: Questions on the Effectiveness of U.S. Navy Battleship Gunnery, Part III". Warship International. XLII (3): 264–266. ISSN 0043-0374.
- Marder, Arthur J. (1969). From the Dreadnought to Scapa Flow: The Year of Crisis. Vol. IV. Oxford University Press.
- Massie, Robert K. (2003). Castles of Steel: Britain, Germany, and the Winning of the Great War at Sea. Random House. ISBN 0-345-40878-0.
- Pollen, Anthony (1980). The Great Gunnery Scandal – The Mystery of Jutland. Collins. p. 23. ISBN 0-00-216298-9.
