= Pollin =

Pollin is a surname. Notable people with the surname include:

- Abe Pollin (1923–2009), American sports team owner
- Andy Pollin (born 1958), American radio and television personality
- Robert Pollin (born 1950), American economist
- William Pollin (1922–2008), American psychiatrist
