= Pollein =

Pollein Polèn (Valdôtain)
- Comune
- Comune di Pollein; Commune de Pollein
- Location within Italy Location within Aosta Valley
- Coordinates: 45°43′40.80″N 7°21′25.20″E
- Country: Italy
- Region: Aosta Valley
- Province: none
- Frazioni: Le Château, Chez-Buillet, La Cisaz, Chenaux, Chênières, Les Crêtes, Donache, Le Drégier, La Grand-Place, Le Grand-Pollein, L'Île-des-Lapins, Les Îles, Marchaussy, Le Moulin, Le Petit-Pollein, Le Plan-des-Crêtes, Les Prés-de-Doire, Le Rabloz, Rongachet, Saint-Bénin, Terre-Blanche-Dessous, Terre-Blanche-Dessus, Tharençan

Area
  - Total: 15 km^{2} (5.8 sq mi)
- Elevation: 551 m (1,808 ft)

Population (31 December 2022)
  - Total: 1,485
  - Density: 99/km^{2} (260/sq mi)
- Demonym: Pollençois
- Time zone: UTC+1 (CET)
  - Summer (DST): UTC+2 (CEST)
- Postal code: 11020
- Dialing code: 0165
- ISTAT code: 7049
- Patron saint: Saint George
- Saint day: 23 April
- Website: Official website

Pollein (French: [pɔlɛ̃]; Valdôtain: Polèn) is a town and comune in the Aosta Valley region of north-western Italy.
