= John Hungerford Pollen (Jesuit) =

English Jesuit and historian

John Hungerford Pollen (22 September 1858–1925) was an English Jesuit, known as a historian of the Protestant Reformation.

== Life ==
John Hungerford Pollen was the son of John Hungerford Pollen and Maria Margaret Pollen. The third of ten children, he was born in London in 1858. His father was professor of fine arts at the Catholic University in Dublin. Pollen junior was educated at The Oratory School in Birmingham, and then London University.

Pollen entered the Society of Jesus in 1877 and was ordained in 1891. In 1895 he was assigned the task of creating a history of the Society in England. Pollen became involved in historical research and archives. His research took him through England, France, and Italy. By 1920 he held the title of Keeper of the Archives.

He was one of the group of Jesuit historians restoring the reputation of Robert Persons. He was influential in the history of the term Counter-Reformation, accepting for the Catholic side the appellation for the period of Catholic reform centred on the Council of Trent, but at the same time offering an interpretation that made it less reactive, in relation to the Protestant Reformation. These ideas were put forth in the 1908 Catholic Encyclopedia article he wrote on the subject. Pollen was also a contributor to The Month, and the Dublin Review.

Pollen was vice-postulator for the beatification of the English Martyrs.

He was a correspondent of Georg Cantor, from 1896 and a founding member with Joseph Stanislaus Hansom of the Catholic Record Society in 1904.

== Works ==
- Acts of the English Martyrs, Burns and Oates, (1891)
- Life of Father John Morris (1886)
- Papal Negotiations with Mary, Queen of Scots (1901)
- Unpublished Documents Relating to the English Martyrs (1908)
- The Bedingfield Papers (1909)
- A Jesuit Challenge: Edmund Campion's Debates at the Tower of London in 1581 (1914; edited with Joseph Rickaby)
- The English Catholics in the Reign of Queen Elizabeth, Longmans, Green and Co. (1920)
- The Counter-Reformation in Scotland, Sands & Co., (1921)
- Sources for the history of Roman Catholics in England, Ireland, and Scotland, Society for Christian Knowledge, (1921)
- Saint Ignatius of Loyola, Burns Oates and Washbourne Limited, (1922)
