= John Hungerford Pollen (senior) =

English architect and writer (1820–1902)

John Hungerford Pollen (1820–1902) was an English architect and writer on crafts and furniture.

== Life ==
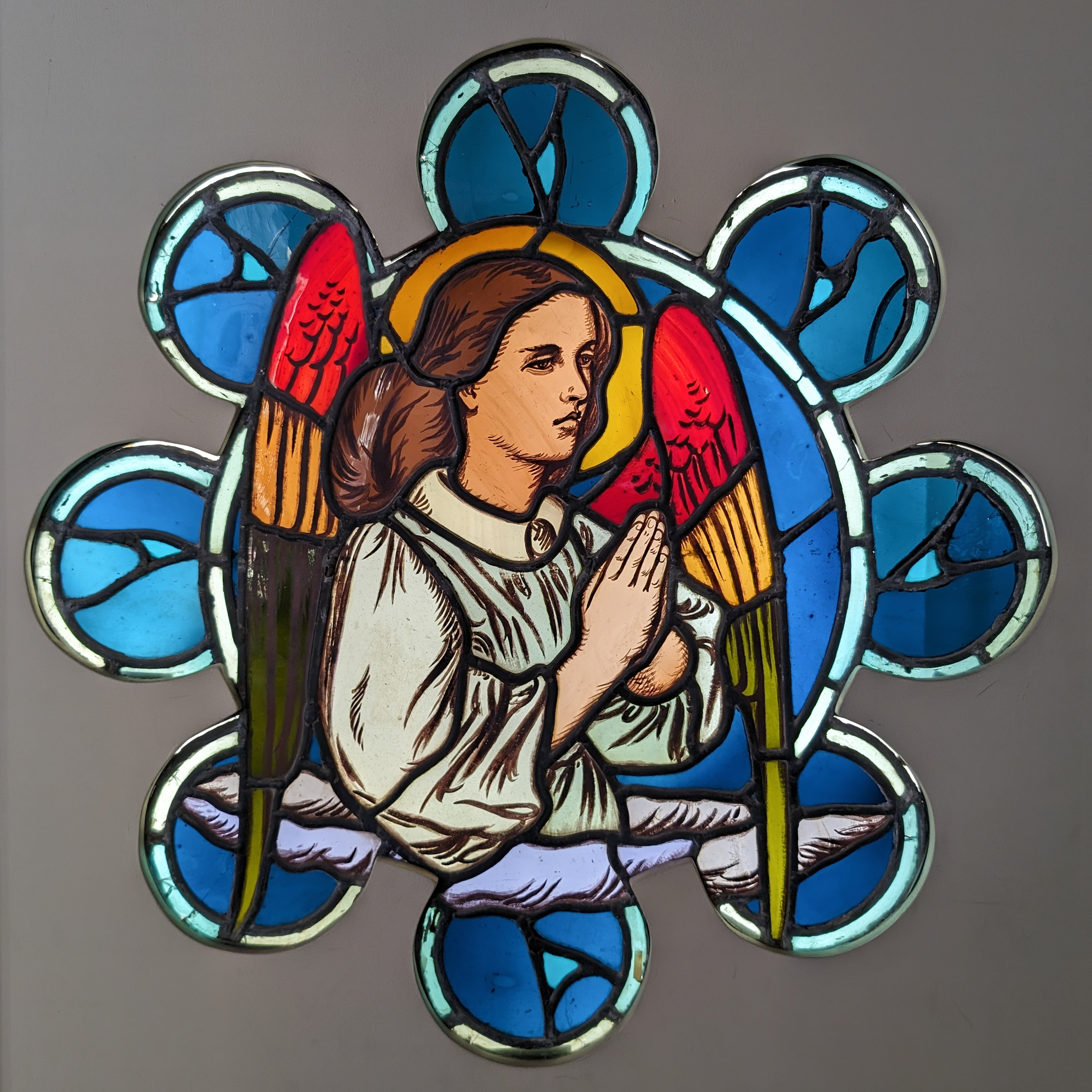
Stained glass of an angel designed by Pollen for the Catholic Church of Our Lady of the Assumption, Rhyl

Pollen was educated at Eton College and Christ Church, Oxford. He was ordained as an Anglican priest in 1845, with a parish in Leeds from 1847, writing of his experiences. Pollen converted to Roman Catholicism in 1852. He worked on numerous decorative projects in the 1850s, starting with the hall ceiling at Merton College, Oxford, where he was a Fellow from 1842; his conversion entailed his giving up that fellowship.

Other works, mainly in collaboration, were on the University Museum in Oxford, and the Arthurian murals at the Oxford Union, in a group led by Dante Gabriel Rossetti and including William Morris, Edward Burne-Jones, Val Prinsep, and Roddam Spencer Stanhope.

He worked with John Henry Newman on church architecture and decoration, and was responsible for the design of the Catholic University Church in Dublin. He also worked on the Brompton Oratory. Newman invited him to take up a position at the Catholic University of Ireland, and Pollen was Professor of Fine Arts there, from 1855 to 1857.

He returned to England in 1857, settling in Hampstead, London. He worked for The Tablet, and through John Everett Millais expanded his contacts with the Pre-Raphaelite circle.

Later he worked for the South Kensington Museum, where he was appointed assistant keeper in 1863, and was made editor to its science and art department, producing catalogues. He compiled, with Henry Cole, a Universal Catalogue of Books on Art. This was a multi-volume project, beginning publication in 1870, its aim being to furnish a complete bibliographical record of art books in libraries of the West.

He resigned his position at the South Kensington Museum to become private secretary to George Robinson, 1st Marquess of Ripon, whom he then accompanied on a visit to India.

There is a memorial stained glass window in the north aisle of St Mary of the Angels, Bayswater by James Powell & Sons based on a sketch of Pollen's for the Chapel of Studley Royal.

== Works ==
- Letter to the Parishioners of St. Saviour's, Leeds (1851)
- Narrative of Five Years at St. Saviour's, Leeds (1851)
- A Description of the Trajan Column, Chapman & Hall, London, (1874) online text
- Ancient and modern Furniture and Woodwork (1876)
- Gold and Silver Smiths' Work

== Family ==
Architect C. R. Cockerell was his uncle. He married Maria Margaret La Primaudaye in 1855. She was known as an authority on the history of textiles, notably lace.

They had ten children. His second child was John Hungerford Pollen, Jesuit and writer; his third child, Walter, died of fever in India; his eighth child was inventor Arthur Pollen. His daughter Anna wrote a biography of her father.

The Pollen family archive is held at the Bodleian Library, Oxford.
