= Healthcare in Norfolk =

Provision of medical services in England

Healthcare in Norfolk was the responsibility of five clinical commissioning groups: Great Yarmouth and Waveney CCG, Norwich CCG, North Norfolk CCG, West Norfolk CCG and South Norfolk CCG, they merged in April 2020 becoming the Norfolk and Waveney CCG until they were replaced by an integrated care system in July 2022. Social Care is the responsibility of Norfolk County Council. The Norfolk and Waveney Integrated Care System (ICS) works with NHS, local authorities and voluntary sector partners to plan, design and deliver health and care services across the region, including community engagement programmes that seek to tailor services to local needs.

== History ==
From 1947 to 1965, NHS services in Norfolk were managed by the East Anglian regional hospital boards. In 1974 the boards were abolished and replaced by regional health authorities. Norfolk came under the East Anglian RHA. There was a Norfolk Area Health Authority from 1974 until 1982. There were three district health authorities: Great Yarmouth and Waveney, West Norfolk and Wisbech and Norwich created in 1982. In 1993 these were reorganised into North West Anglia (which included a part of Cambridgeshire), Norwich, and Great Yarmouth and Waveney. Regional health authorities were reorganised and renamed strategic health authorities in 2002. Norfolk was under the Norfolk, Suffolk and Cambridgeshire SHA. In 2006 regions were again reorganised and Norfolk came under NHS East of England until that was abolished in 2013. There were two primary care trusts for the county: Norfolk and Great Yarmouth and Waveney.

Waveney has always been included with Norfolk as far as the administration of the NHS is concerned

== Health and wellbeing board for Norfolk and Waveney ==
In 2012 the Health and Social Care Act set up health and wellbeing boards; this led to the formation in 2013 of The Health and Wellbeing Board for Norfolk and Waveney that holds responsibility for public health its area. This has been chaired since 2017 by Cllr. Bill Borrett.

The members of the board are as follows:

Healthwatch Norfolk, the Norfolk Police and Crime Commissioner's Office, Norfolk's seven District Councils and East Suffolk District Council which contains the Waveney valley, The Norfolk and Waveney Clinical Commissioning Group, Norfolk's three acute hospitals, Norfolk County Council, the Norfolk and Waveney Sustainability Partnership (STP), Norfolk Community Health and Care NHS Trust, East Coast Community Healthcare CIC, voluntary community and social enterprise sector representatives and Norfolk and Suffolk NHS Foundation Trust.

The board meets in public once a quarter and members of the public can put questions to the board. The board produces and annual strategy which all the partner organisations agree to implement in their respective spheres. The details of the current strategy and future meeting dates are hosted on Norfolk County Council’s website (Health and Wellbeing Board).

== Sustainability and Transformation Plan (STP) ==
Norfolk and Waveney formed a sustainability and transformation plan area in March 2016. A board was constituted and Patricia Hewitt was elected to be the chairman in June 2017 after the previous chairman Dr Wendy Thompson stepped aside due to the increasing workload conflicting with her responsibilities at Norfolk County Council.

Once a year a forward strategy is submitted for approval to the Health and Wellbeing Board for Norfolk and Waveney.

Due to the aging population of the county leading to increased demand, the projected deficit in 2020/21 is £415 million. It is proposed that with investment in primary care, 20% of patients who currently go to hospital will be cared for in community instead.

Antek Lejk, chief officer of South Norfolk and North Norfolk clinical commissioning groups was the executive lead for the STP, he resigned and was appointed chief executive of Norfolk and Suffolk NHS Foundation Trust in March 2018. He was succeeded by Melanie Craig the chief officer of the Great Yarmouth and Waveney CCG. In April 2020 she was appointed joint chief officer and finance officer for the new Norfolk and Waveney CCG.

Consideration of a major reconfiguration of stroke services was reported in October 2018. There would be two major hubs at Norfolk and Norwich University Hospital and Addenbrooke's Hospital. Norwich is to be equipped to perform thrombectomies.

In September 2020 Norfolk and Norwich University Hospitals NHS Foundation Trust, James Paget University Hospitals NHS Foundation Trust and Queen Elizabeth Hospital King's Lynn NHS Foundation Trust established a “committee in common” where the senior managers will meet monthly to oversee the major acute integration strategy. Meetings will be in private with neither patients nor clinicians.

== Commissioning ==
There was one clinical commissioning group (CCG) for Norfolk and Waveney, which was formed in April 2020 from the merger of the five smaller boards,

== Primary care ==
There are 92 GP practices in the county (including Waveney). Out-of-hours services are provided by the East of England Ambulance Service NHS Trust. The Vida Healthcare group of practices runs the largest practice in Norfolk, and has a personal medical services contract. In 2016 it was proposed to cut this funding by £250,000 over four years from 2016 to 2020. At the time The Patient Participation Group was upset that they had not been consulted about this.

== Acute care ==
Norfolk and Norwich University Hospitals NHS Foundation Trust is the largest provider. The trust provides almost one million outpatient appointments, day-case procedures and inpatient admissions each year, and works in partnership with the University of East Anglia in medical education and research. Its A&E department is the busiest in the east of England. There are three acute hospitals in the county: The Norfolk and Norwich University Hospital in Norwich, The Queen Elizabeth Hospital in King's Lynn and the James Paget University Hospital in Great Yarmouth.

Ambulance services are provided by the East of England Ambulance Service.

== Mental health ==
Norfolk and Suffolk NHS Foundation Trust is the main NHS provider.

Norfolk and Suffolk NHS Foundation Trust supports a population of around 1.6 million and delivers specialist mental health services for people of all ages, including inpatient and community care for individuals with learning disabilities and autism.

In September 2021 a review commissioned by Norfolk County Council challenged the continued use of “profit-driven” private hospitals, noting “indifferent and harmful” care of patients with learning disabilities at Cawston Park where there had been deaths of three young adults. That hospital was closed and the provider, Jeesal Akman Care Corporation went into liquidation.

== Community services ==
Norfolk Community Health and Care NHS Trust is the main NHS provider.

Norfolk Community Health and Care NHS Trust provides more than 70 community-based services, delivering care in community hospitals, GP surgeries, and care in patients' homes, serving a population of nearly 900.000 people.

== HealthWatch ==
Healthwatch is an organisation set up under the Health and Social Care Act 2012 to act as a voice for patients.

== See also ==
- Category:Health in Norfolk
- Healthcare in the United Kingdom
