= Thomas Hayter =

English whig divine and bishop

The Right Reverend and Right Honourable Thomas Hayter FRS
- Lord Bishop of London
- Church: Church of England
- See: London
- Installed: 1761
- Term ended: 1762
- Predecessor: Thomas Sherlock
- Successor: Richard Osbaldeston
- Other post: Bishop of Norwich

Personal details
- Born: 1702 Chagford, Devon
- Died: 9 January 1762 (aged 59) London
- Buried: All Saints Church, Fulham, London

Ordination history
History
Diaconal ordination
- Ordained by: Lancelot Blackburne
Priestly ordination
- Ordained by: Lancelot Blackburne

Thomas Hayter FRS (1702 – 9 January 1762) was an English whig divine, who served as a Church of England bishop for 13 years as Bishop of Norwich (1749–1761) then Bishop of London (1761–1762), and was a royal chaplain. As a party advocate of the Pelhamites and a friend of the Duke of Newcastle, he was at the height of his powers in the 1750s. A scholar renowned in his days, it was for his divinity that Hayter was recommended, but his friendship with the court and royalty that exemplified his actual powers. He was considered tolerant and eclectic, learned and intelligent.

== Life ==
He was born in Chagford, Devon, the son of George Hayter, rector of Chagford, and his wife Grace, and was baptised in Chagford on 17 November 1702.

It has often been claimed that Hayter was the illegitimate son of Lancelot Blackburne, for instance in the letters of Horace Walpole. While Blackburne did resign as Sub-Dean of Exeter in 1703 when accused of a sexual scandal (of which he was cleared by a church investigation), this was with a woman named Mary Martin, unconnected with Hayter. It was not until decades later, in the 1730s, that opponents of Blackburne (then Archbishop of York) conflated the past accusation with Blackburne's patronage of Hayter and insinuated that Hayter was Blackburne's illegitimate son. However, Blackburne left a sizeable portion of his estate to Hayter.

Hayter studied at Blundell's School, Tiverton, and matriculated at Balliol College, Oxford on 30 May 1720, where he graduated BA on 21 January 1724. He took further degrees at Emmanuel College, Cambridge (MA 1727 and DD 1744).

After Oxford, he immediately went to work as secretary to Archbishop Blackburne, continuing in this role for nearly twenty years. He was initially a layman, but Blackburne ordained him as a deacon on 9 July 1727, and as a priest only twenty days later. Blackburne appointed him as one of his private chaplains in 1729.

In the church, Hayter held the following livings:

- Prebendary of York Minster (1728–1749)
- Prebendary of Southwell Minster (1728–1749)
- Rector of Kirkby Overblow, Yorkshire (1729–1749)
- Sub-Dean of York (1730–1749)
- Archdeacon of York (1730–1751)
- Rector of Etton, Yorkshire (1731)
- Chaplain to the King (1734–1749)
- Vicar of Kirkby-in-Cleveland, Yorkshire (1737–1749)
- Prebendary of Westminster Abbey (1739–1749)

Holding three prebendal stalls in succession in the northern episcopate marked him out for high promotion as he rose through the York chapter. He was Bishop of Norwich from 1749 to 1761. He had been elected a Fellow of the Royal Society in March 1750 he secured the dismissal of two Jacobite tutors in 1755 named Stone and Scott for seditious attempts to influence the Prince George in the ways of Jacobitism. In later life George III was a self-evident Tory but had learnt a hard lesson in politics from his learned counsel. He was a revelatory evangelist at the pulpit, a doctrinal latitudinarian, condemned mishandling of the poor, and urged temperance, and wider acceptance of clandestine marriages. "...the very ideas we form of them arise from their being distributed among Men in various Degrees and Proportions. They are indeed by the Appointment of God, adjusted by the Scheme of Things in this world only", exemplified a sophisticated aristocratic notion of how Man came down. However he then went on to qualify his remarks "...The Original quality of Human nature still subsists under all these external Distinctions..." his theology strongly upheld the goodness of human sensibilities as it permeates human consciousness. Yet he was a Man of the World "protecting the Innocent, countenancing the Virtuous, and spreading Prosperity, through Whole Nations." Warning of the uneasiness of vice, he yet remained uncloistered and enlightened. A moderate whig he asked the eternal question Does Temperance injure the Mind? asking those difficult questions posed by London living. In 1758, Hayter asked noted surgeon Benjamin Gooch to visit all the great hospitals in London with a view to building a general hospital for the County of Norfolk and the City of Norwich jointly. After Bishop Hayter's death in 1762, a friend and wealthy landowner, William Fellowes of Shotesham Park, stepped in "to revive the plan" and Norfolk and Norwich Hospital was founded in 1771.

It was the death of Frederick, Prince of Wales that precipitated his nomination as tutor to the Princess's household. In 1751, Hayter was chosen to replace Francis Ayscough as the tutor to the future George III. Impressed, Newcastle, also a friend, called him "a sensible and well-bred man", pro-Establishment leanings, earned excoriating criticism from the septic society gossip Horace Walpole. The whiggish dislike of the Princess doting over her many children was largely blamed on Hayter's seemingly Tory-inspired influences, often misinterpreted as mischievous. Nonetheless Hayter remained in favour at court. His conduct with Prince George, the future king, earned praise from the staid The Gentleman's Magazine.

In the House of Lords Hayter took a surprisingly liberal stance on the Jewish Naturalisation bill, for which he was roundly insulted at York. Feeling weak and frequently feverish he joined the royals on their habitual progresses to the Spa towns of the west of England. In 1758 he preached a renowned sermon at the London Guildhall in front of the Duke of Devonshire to inspire the government on the treatment of patients at the Foundling Hospital in St Bartholomew's. He was seen taking the waters at Malvern as early as 1761 for rheumatic pains.

Hayter gained preferment as Bishop of London on 19 September 1761, was made a Privy Councillor the same year. He was patronised by Lord Talbot, the Catholic nobleman, who secured his nomination at Bow Church in the East End to be Bishop of London on 24 October 1761 where he was ordained. As bishop of London he held the subsidiary post of dean of the Chapel Royal, a post he held until his death on 9 January 1762 at his house in Lisle Street, Leicester Fields, London from dropsy. He was recognised by the erection of a white marble tomb and was buried in the churchyard of All Saints Church, Fulham, London, on 16 January 1762.

Church of England titles
| Preceded by Samuel Lisle | Bishop of Norwich; 1749–1761 | Succeeded by Philip Yonge |
| Preceded by Thomas Sherlock | Bishop of London; 1761–1762 | Succeeded by Richard Osbaldeston |
