= Richard Lubbock =

English chemist and physician

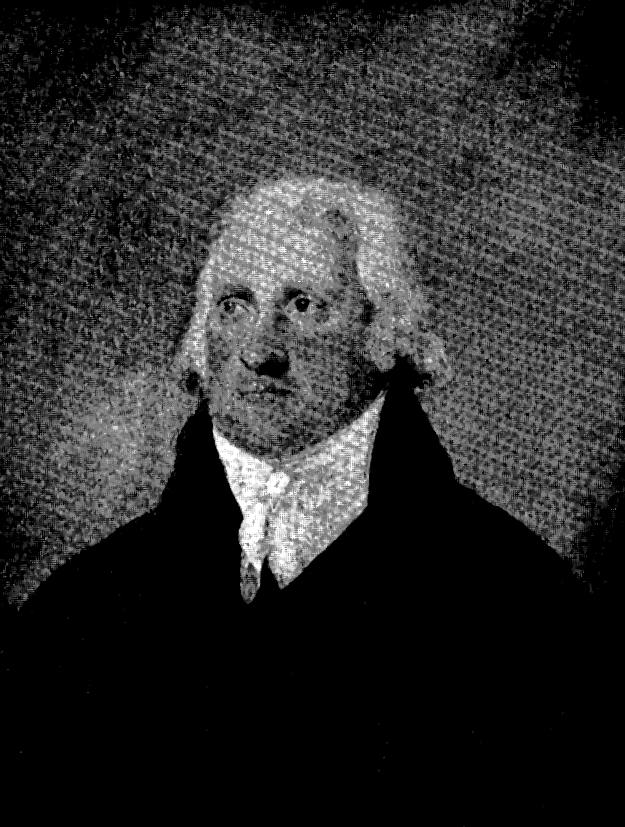
The only known portrait of Lubbock, by John Crome, 1808

Richard Lubbock (c. 1759 – 2 September 1808) was an English physician and chemist who documented the contemporary history of phlogiston theory in England in his 1784 dissertation, which was based on the teachings of Joseph Black.

== Life and work ==
Lubbock was born in Norwich where he was educated at the Grammar School under a Mr Lemon and Mr Rigby before going to the University of Edinburgh. He then returned to practice as a physician in Norfolk and Norwich Hospital. His son Reverend Richard Lubbock, who became rector of Eccles is known for his work in natural history of the Norfolk Broads while another son Edward also became a physician. Lubbock lived on 76 St. Gile's Street. He also wrote papers on diabetes, catalepsy, apoplexy and vaccination and was held in high regard as a physician.

=== Chemical theory of oxygen ===
The main work of Lubbock that has been examined by historians of chemistry is Lubbock's MD dissertation of 1784. Here he examined the contemporary phlogiston theory at a time when his teacher Joseph Black was beginning to give up the idea in favour of Lavoisier's theory. Lubbock conducted experiments, suggested theories, and demonstrated how some hypotheses could be rejected based on the experimental results. Lubbock conjectured that burning involved a substance reacting with air and producing another substance along with light and heat. He used the word "pure air" which he considered also as "principium sorbile sive commune" for oxygen. He noted that it combined with sulphur, charcoal, and phosphorus, setting free heat and light ("principium aeri proprium" which he considered as massless) and that the "air" lost a part of its volume. He used the terms Attractio duplex (AB+CD=AC+BD) and Attractio simplex (A+BC=AC+B) as guiding possibilities to be compared. Lubbock noted that his teacher Joseph Black taught phlogiston theory, despite having lost confidence in its soundness. A footnote in the thesis suggests that Black had rejected the idea at least by 1784 and not much later as suggested by a 1790 letter that Black wrote to Lavoisier. Lubbock also examined if "phlogiston" was involved in the gravitational force. Lubbock finally came with his theory of combustion and set out his ideas as - "pure air"/principium sorbile sive commune (now oxygen); principium aeri proprium (matter of light and heat); combustibles (phosphorus, sulphur, charcoal, some metals etc.) which after absorbing more principium sorbile than the principium aeri proprium gives up upon calcination the principium aeri proprium (heat); that the combustibles themselves never lose any principle; principium aeri proprium comes from the sun and is massless; water is made up of principium sorbile and inflammable air; organic respiration, fermentation and decay involve the use of principium sorbile from the air; and acid and calces (alkalis) are made up of some principle in combination with principium sorbile. Lubbock's ideas spread quickly into Europe.
