= Bernard Ribeiro, Baron Ribeiro =

British surgeon and life peer (born 1944)

The Right Honourable The Lord Ribeiro CBE FRCS
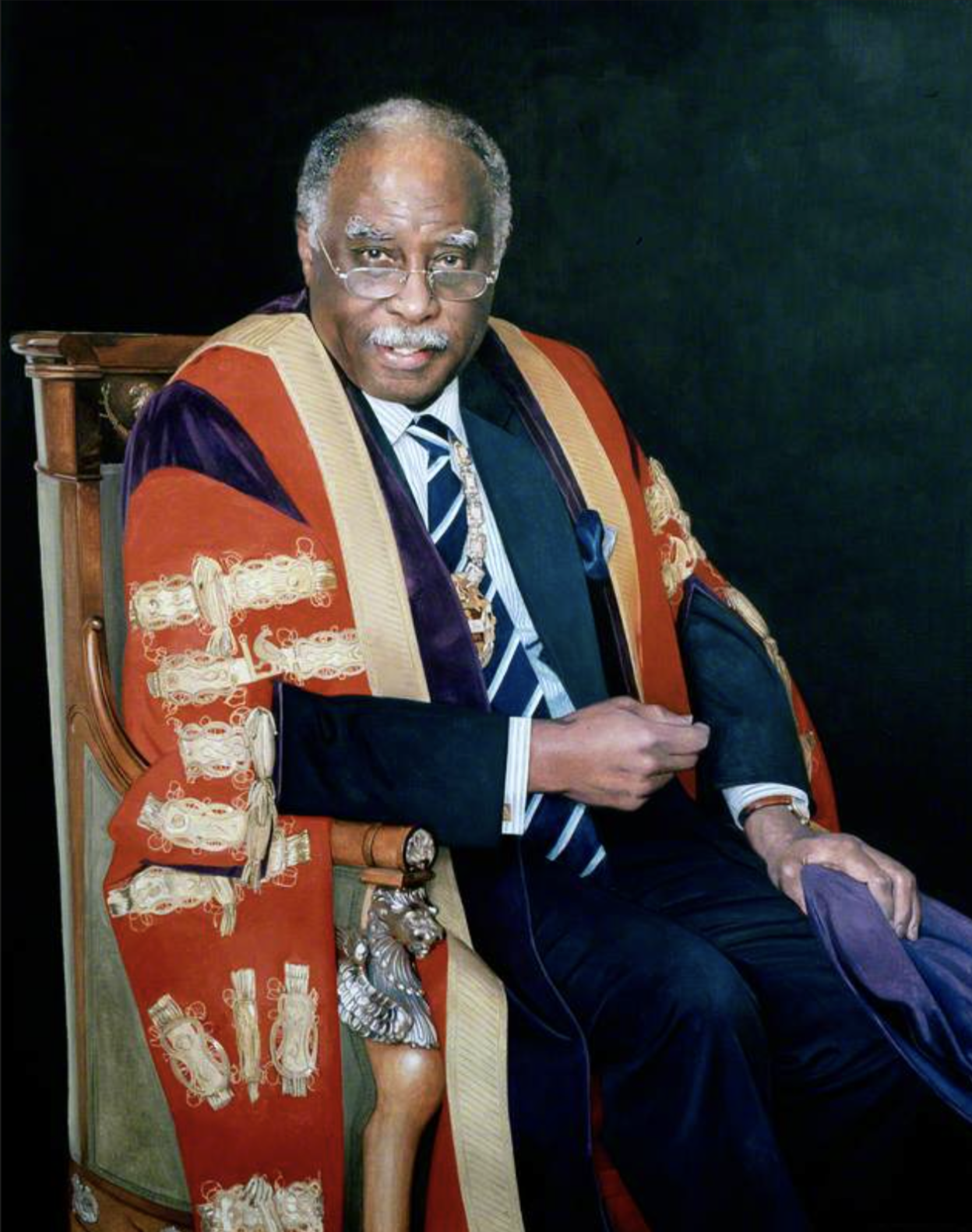

Member of the House of Lords
- Lord Temporal
- Life peerage 20 December 2010 – 23 October 2023

Personal details
- Born: Bernard Francisco Ribeiro; 20 January 1944 (age 82) Achimota, Gold Coast
- Scientific career
- Education: Dean Close School, Cheltenham, Gloucestershire; Middlesex Hospital Medical School
- Known for: President of the Royal College of Surgeons of England 2005–08
- Awards: CBE 2004; FRCS; Knight Bachelor 2009

Bernard Francisco Ribeiro, Baron Ribeiro (born 20 January 1944), is a British surgeon who served as President of the Royal College of Surgeons of England (RCS England) from 2005 to 2008. He was created a life peer in 2010 and sat in the House of Lords on the Conservative benches until his retirement in 2023.

== Biography ==
Born in 1944 in Achimota in the Gold Coast (now Ghana), Bernard Ribeiro was educated at Dean Close School, Cheltenham, Gloucestershire, and at Middlesex Hospital Medical School.

Ribeiro qualified as a doctor at Middlesex Medical School in 1967 and then specialised in surgery, five years later being awarded Fellowship of the Royal College of Surgeons (FRCS). From 1979 until his retirement in April 2008, he was consultant general surgeon at Basildon Hospital, with a special interest in urology and colorectal surgery, pioneering the use of invasive keyhole surgery, and helping to establish the Basildon and Thurrock University Hospitals NHS Foundation Trust's advanced laparoscopic unit. He was elected to the Council of the Royal College of Surgeons of England in 1998. In 2008, he was awarded the Honorary degree of Doctor of Science by Anglia Ruskin University. Also in 2008 he received an Honorary Fellowship from the American College of Surgeons.

In the 2004 New Year Honours, he was appointed a Commander of the Order of the British Empire (CBE) for services to medicine, and was appointed Knight Bachelor in the 2009 New Year Honours. He was created a life peer on 20 December 2010, as Baron Ribeiro, of Achimota in the Republic of Ghana and of Ovington in the County of Hampshire.

In 2012, Lord Ribeiro was confirmed as Chair of the Department of Health's Independent Reconfiguration Panel, advising the Secretary of State for Health on changes to local health services in England. He serves as Master of the Worshipful Company of Barbers for 2013–14. He is President of the Council of Dean Close School.

Lord Ribeiro is an active Freemason and currently serves the United Grand Lodge of England as the Right Worshipful Senior Grand Warden. He was previously the Senior Grand Deacon in 2005, and Junior Grand Warden in 2018.

In November 2020, he was appointed to the board of the Equality and Human Rights Commission, and was appointed Chancellor of Anglia Ruskin University on 1 January 2021.

== Family ==
Ribeiro's immediate family is made up of his wife, Elisabeth, and four children, Joanna Charlotte, Tessa Elisabeth, Nicola Helen, and Richard Francisco Ribeiro.

== Medical work ==
In 2014, there was an Assisted Dying Bill that was proposed by Lord Falconer. This bill aimed to make it legal for doctors to provide patients medication that would end their life if they chose. Ribeiro was not in favour of this bill, believing that it would complicate patient-doctor relationships.

In 2007, Ribeiro responded to two of his colleagues Maynard and Ayalew, detailing how establishments such as Royal College of Surgeons of England are working to implement patient-reported outcome measures for elective surgical procedures. Ribeiro believed that the entire National Health Service and its patients would benefit. This implementation would also lead to higher levels of training and teaching standards.

Ribeiro began his career at Basildon Hospital, where he was appointed in 1979. In addition to his development of many surgery techniques, such as minimally invasive surgery, he was also instrumental in bringing the construction of the Essex Cardiothoracic Centre to the Basildon Hospital. The Essex Cardiothoracic Centre at Basildon Hospital routinely sees 300,000 outpatients in addition to seeing 103,000 accident and emergency patients.

== Career and later roles ==
Lord Bernard Francisco Ribeiro (born 20 January 1944) is a British surgeon and life peer whose career spans clinical practice, professional leadership, and public service. He qualified as a medical doctor at Middlesex Hospital Medical School in 1967 and became a consultant general surgeon at Basildon University Hospital in Essex in 1979, where he pioneered minimally invasive "keyhole" surgery and helped establish the advanced laparoscopic unit at Basildon & Thurrock University Hospitals NHS Foundation Trust. From 2005 to 2008, he served as President of the Royal College of Surgeons of England, one of the most senior surgical leadership roles in the United Kingdom.

In the 2004 New Year Honours, Ribeiro was appointed a CBE for services to medicine, and in the 2009 New Year Honours he was knighted as a Knight Bachelor. He was created a life peer on 20 December 2010, taking the title Baron Ribeiro, of Achimota in the Republic of Ghana and of Ovington in the County of Hampshire, and sat in the House of Lords on the Conservative benches until his retirement from the Lords on 23 October 2023.

Following his retirement from clinical practice in 2008, Ribeiro held several public sector leadership roles. From 2012 to 2019, he was Chair of the Independent Reconfiguration Panel, advising the Secretary of State for Health on major changes to local health services in England. He has also served on the Royal College of Surgeons of England’s diversity review panel. In November 2020, he was appointed a member of the Equality and Human Rights Commission board to provide medical and public health expertise.

In January 2021, Ribeiro was appointed Chancellor of Anglia Ruskin University (ARU), succeeding Lord Ashcroft. In this capacity, he has delivered lectures and engaged publicly on issues at the intersection of medicine, education, and public policy.

== Awards and honours ==
Ribeiro was awarded the Fellowship of the Royal College of Surgeons in 1972. He was then awarded the role of Consultant General Surgeon in 1979 at Basildon Hospital. From 1999 until 2000, he was President of the Association of Surgeons across Great Britain as well as Ireland.

From 2005 to 2008, Ribeiro was President of the Royal College of Surgeons, being particularly notable as its first black president. He received the CBE award in 2004, for making outstanding contributions towards medicine. In 2012, Ribeiro was appointed Chairman of the Independent Recognition Panel, whose responsibility was to advise the Secretary of State for Health. Ribeiro was also added as a member of the European Union's Home Affairs Sub-Committee in the House of Lords. He was also tasked as a committee member for the Select Committee on the Long-Term Sustainability of the NHS and Adult Social Care.

Ribeiro is best known for his development and execution of keyhole surgery. It was this achievement that helped Ribeiro become acknowledged and inducted into the House of Lords. He also holds honorary degrees from multiple universities—including the University of Bath and Anglia Ruskin University—as well as an honorary fellowship with the American College of Surgeons.

Academic offices
| Preceded by Hugh Phillips | President of the Royal College of Surgeons of England; 2005–2008 | Succeeded by John Black |
Orders of precedence in the United Kingdom
| Preceded by The Lord Sharkey | Gentlemen; Baron Ribeiro | Followed by The Lord Lexden |
