= Kenneth McKee =

English orthopaedist

- Born: 5 January 1906; Ilford, Essex, England
- Died: 18 July 1991 (aged 85)
- Education: St. Bartholomew’s Hospital Medical College
- Medical career
- Profession: Orthopedics
- Institutions: Norfolk and Norwich University Hospital
- Research: Hip replacement

George Kenneth McKee CBE (5 January 1906 – 18 July 1991) was an English orthopaedist, one of the pioneers of hip replacement surgery in the 1950s. He is now honoured with a bust at the Norfolk and Norwich University Hospital.

== Early life ==
McKee's father was a medical practitioner in Ireland in the late 19th century. He then migrated to England around 1900. McKee was born in Ilford, Essex, in 1906, attending Chigwell School and then studying medicine at St. Bartholomew's Hospital Medical College. He received his Fellowship of the Royal College of Surgeons in 1934. He worked at the Sheffield Royal Hospital before being appointed consultant in orthopaedics at the Norfolk and Norwich Hospital (N&N) in 1939.

== Hip replacement work ==
McKee moved to Norfolk in 1939. He worked in Norwich at the Norfolk and Norwich Hospital (N&N), which he joined in 1939 as a consultant orthopaedic surgeon, going on to pioneer primary hip replacements in the 1950s. According to Hugh Phillips, the President of the Royal College of Surgeons of England 2004–2005, "Ken McKee started experimenting with model hip joints in 1938, working with dentists and an engineering firm in Norwich to create the original brass mock-ups. He carried out his first primary hip replacement on a patient in 1951, before Sir John Charnley perfected his own version."

He retired to Tacolneston in the 1970s.

== Commemorations ==
In 1972 in recognition of his services to orthopaedic surgery he was appointed Commander of the Order of the British Empire and three years later received an Honorary Doctorate of Science of Cambridge University. He was awarded the Honorary Fellowship of the Royal Society of Medicine in 1986.

In addition to a bronze bust cast by his daughter-in-law, the Belgian sculptor Myriam De Kepper, McKee's work at the hospital is remembered with a residence block, McKee House, at the Norfolk and Norwich University Hospital and a road, Kenneth McKee Plain, built on the former N&N site.
