= Hugh Phillips (surgeon) =

British doctor

- Born: 19 March 1940; Blackheath, London, England
- Died: 24 June 2005 (aged 65); Norwich, England
- Medical career
- Profession: Orthopaedics
- Institutions: Norfolk and Norwich Hospital
- Research: Hip replacement

Hugh Phillips was a Consultant Trauma and Orthopaedic Surgeon to the Norfolk and Norwich Hospital. His special surgical interests were in hip and knee reconstruction, following on from Kenneth McKee. He received his Fellowship of the Royal College of Surgeons of England in 1970 and succeeded Professor Sir Peter Morris as the President on 8 July 2004.

Hugh Phillips who lived in Ashwellthorpe was appointed Deputy Lieutenant of Norfolk in 1996.

== Notes ==
Academic offices
Preceded by Sir Peter Morris	President of the Royal College of Surgeons of England; 2004–2005	Succeeded by Bernard Ribeiro
