= Cromer Hospital =

Cromer and District Hospital
- Norfolk and Norwich University Hospitals NHS Foundation Trust
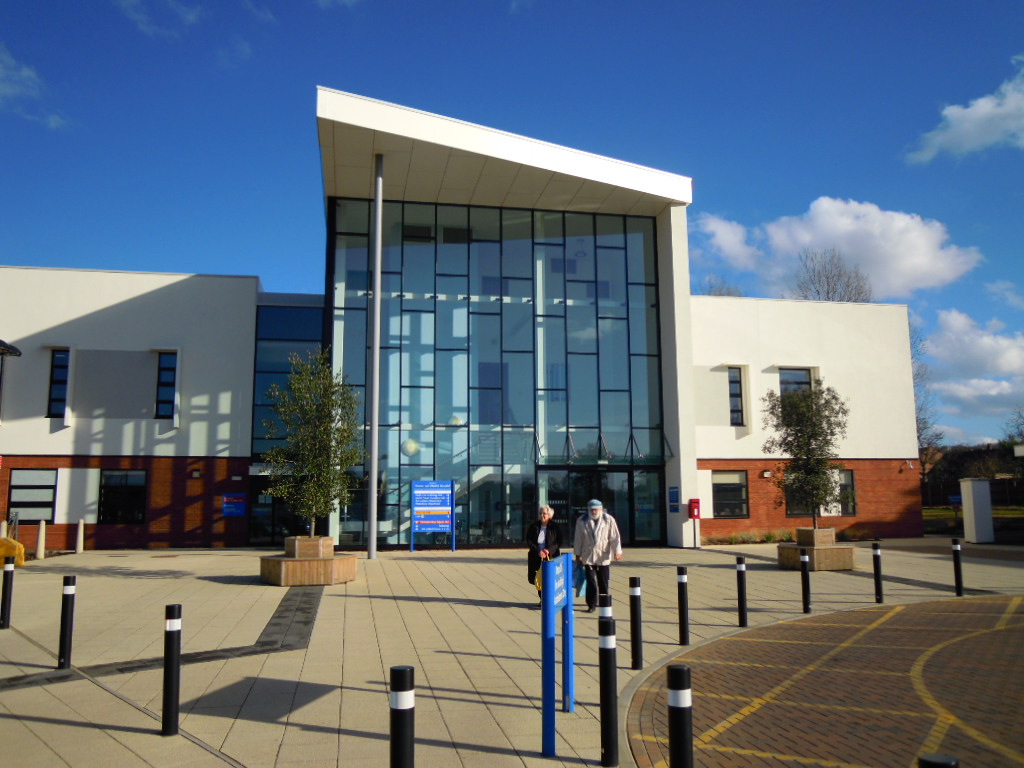
- Main entrance, Cromer Hospital

- Location in Norfolk

Geography
- Location: Cromer, Norfolk, England, United Kingdom
- Coordinates: 52.9238°N 1.3092°E

Organisation
- Care system: Public NHS
- Type: Acute Hospital
- Affiliated university: University of East Anglia

Services
- Emergency department: Minor Injuries Unit only

History
- Founded: 1932

Links
- Website: www.nnuh.nhs.uk/our-services/our-hospitals/cromer-and-district-hospital/
- Lists: Hospitals in England

Cromer and District Hospital (formerly known as Cromer Cottage Hospital) opened in 1932 in the suburb of Suffield Park in the town of Cromer within the English county of Norfolk. The hospital is run by the Norfolk and Norwich University Hospitals NHS Foundation Trust and provides an important range of acute consultant and nurse-led services to the residents of the district of North Norfolk.

== History ==
=== Early history ===
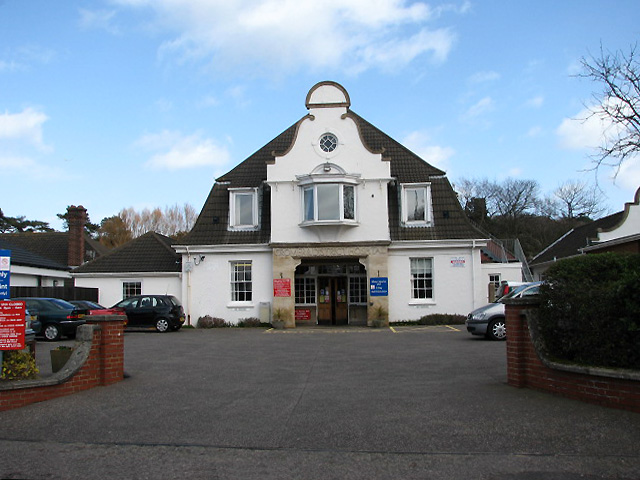
The main entrance to the old hospital before it was demolished

The hospital has its origins in a medical facility formed from two cottages in Louden Road in 1866. The hospital was rebuilt in Louden Road in 1888 but then moved to a purpose-built facility opened by Lady Suffield at Old Mill Road in 1932. The hospital joined the National Health Service in 1948 and a new out-patients building opened in 1954.

=== Redevelopment of the site ===
In 2001 Mrs Sagle Bernstein, a Cromer resident, left £11m to Cromer and District Hospital in recognition of the excellent care that her sister had received as a patient at the hospital. The terms of Mrs Bernstein's will were that it was to be spent on "improvement of general facilities" and could only be spent at Cromer Hospital. Some £500,000 of the legacy was spent on an eight-station renal dialysis unit which opened in June 2006. The dialysis unit was relocated to the refurbished Barclay ward in January 2011.

Following a feasibility study carried out in 2006, a tender competition for the new hospital was undertaken and a planning application for a £26 million scheme was submitted to North Norfolk District Council in November 2008. The trust subsequently scaled back the scheme and a revised planning application for a £15 million scheme was submitted to the District Council in June 2009. After the application was approved in May 2010, construction of the works, which were designed by Purcell Miller Tritton and were undertaken by Mansell, part of Balfour Beatty, started in autumn 2010 and were completed in Autumn 2012.

== Notable Staff ==
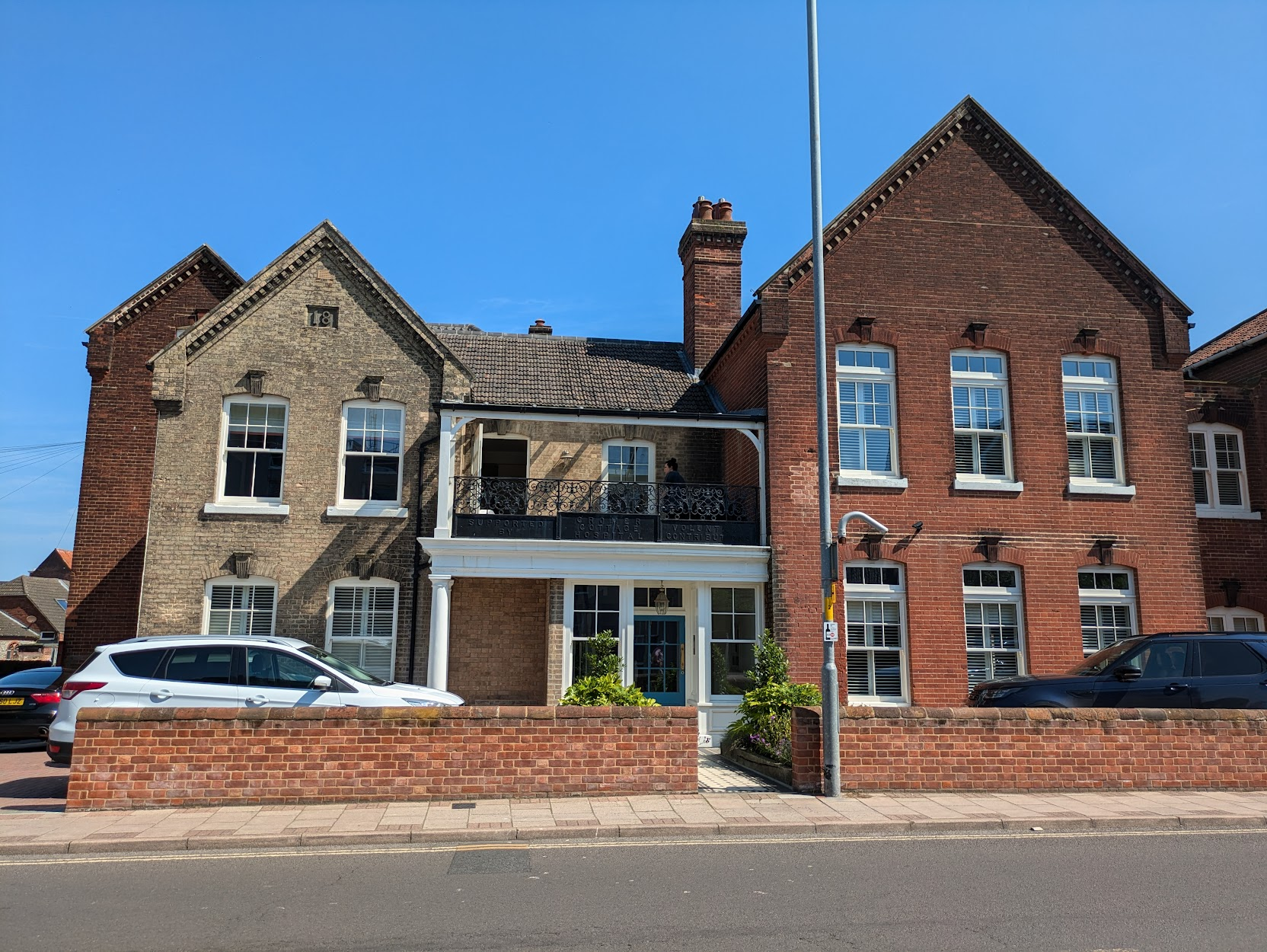
The original 1888 Cromer Cottage Hospital in Louden Road

When the hospital was reopened in 1888 in two houses in Louden Road, a succession of London Hospital trained matrons ran the nursing department of the new hospital until at least 1917. They appear to have been selected because some of the Quaker founders philanthropic interests in both The London Hospital and Cromer Cottage Hospital. Philanthropic individuals who were interested in the management of the cottage hospital and attended the opening of the new cottage hospital in 1888 included Sir Samuel Hoare M.P., and the Buxton and Gurney families, prominent Quaker families. The matrons listed below all trained at The London under Eva Luckes, an influential matron and friend of Florence Nightingale's.

- Emma Minnedew (1859/1860– ), from March 1889
- Sarah Lambert (1858/1859– ), from 1891
- Mary Thompson, from January 1895
- Jessie Brooks (1864– ), from March 1895
- Sarah Lambert, reappointed in 1902
- May Beatrice Towill (1886–1980), from June 1915
- Elsie Mabel Marriot, from November 1917
