= Radiology-Integrated Training Initiative =

The Radiology-Integrated Training Initiative (R-ITI) is a public-sector UK programme to provide an increased number of high-quality radiologists by 2008.

R-ITI is a collaboration between the Royal College of Radiologists, the UK Department of Health and the NHS. It is tasked with providing three new radiology academies, a national archive of peer-validated cases (Validated Case Archive), and over 1,000 e-learning sessions for self-paced learning & knowledge acquisition.

== The reasoning ==
The UK does not produce enough UK trained radiologists to meet clinical need. Calculations show that traditional training will not produce the necessary increase in numbers. Training schemes are becoming saturated and consultant training time is pressurised by heavy service workloads.

The Radiology Integrated Training Initiative (R-ITI) has been created to respond to this need and develop a new approach to training radiologists, increasing capacity to meet demand without putting additional strain on current resources.

Three academies have been established, one in Leeds, one in Norwich at the Norfolk and Norwich University Hospital and one in Plymouth. A fourth academy has been announced in South Wales, to begin intake in August 2017. Each academy offers trainees access to:

- computer linked e-learning sessions
- the Validated Case Archive (VCA) where they can study images and films of actual cases alongside their pathologies and diagnoses
- skills labs to practice practical techniques before going into clinics
- library and tutorial/lecture room facilities
- Norwich Radiology Academy Website

== About Integrated Training Initiatives ==
The Integrated Training Initiative (ITI) creates a stimulating learning environment by combining different teaching methods. These methods include:

- e-learning
- self-assessment using an archive of validated images (VCA)
- formal assessments
- skills labs
- tutorials/lectures
- clinical placements

== Key principles of an ITI ==
- To use small groups and peer learning to enhance the learning experience
- To use technology to extend and enhance the clinical learning environment
- To reach larger numbers of trainees within the existing training structure
- To extend the clinical environment by involving trainees in local service delivery
- To provide more consistent training and effective resources

== Website ==
- RITI web site
