= Norwich Radiology Academy =

Training centre for radiologists

Coordinates: 52.6247°N 1.2230°E

The Norwich Radiology Academy, opened in November 2005, is part of the Norfolk and Norwich University Hospital NHS Trust and is one of only three training centres in England specially created for training consultant radiologists. The Norwich Radiology Academy is located in the Cotman Centre on the Norwich Research Park and was formally opened in February 2006 by the President of the Royal College of Radiologists, Professor Janet Husband.

The Department of Health and Royal College of Radiologists jointly developed the Radiology-Integrated Training Initiative. The initiative provides additional radiology training by splitting training time between a teaching hospital and the radiology academy.
