= Charles Lyttelton (bishop) =

English churchman and antiquary

The Right Reverend Charles Lyttelton
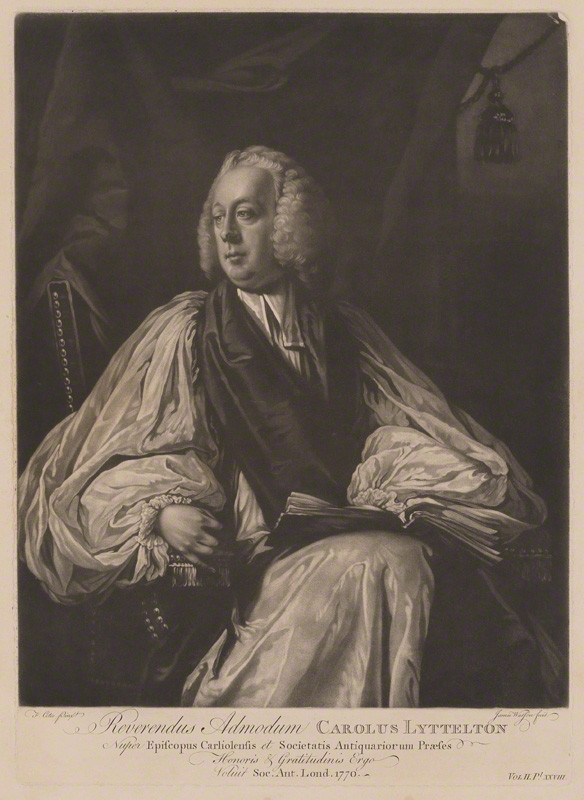
- Diocese: Carlisle
- In office: 1762–1768
- Predecessor: Richard Osbaldeston
- Successor: Edmund Law

Orders
- Ordination: 1742
- Consecration: 21 March 1762

Personal details
- Born: 1714 Hagley, Worcestershire, England
- Died: 22 December 1768 (aged 53–54) London, England
- Buried: St John the Baptist Church, Hagley
- Denomination: Church of England
- Parents: Sir Thomas Lyttelton, 4th Baronet (father)
- Education: Eton College, University College, Oxford

Charles Lyttelton FRS FSA (1714–1768) was an English churchman and antiquary from the Lyttelton family, who served as Bishop of Carlisle from 1762 to 1768 and President of the Society of Antiquaries of London from 1765 to 1768.

== Life ==
Lyttelton was the third son of Sir Thomas Lyttelton, 4th Baronet, by his wife Christian, daughter of Sir Richard Temple, 3rd Baronet of Stowe, Buckinghamshire. He was born at Hagley, Worcestershire, and educated at Eton College and University College, Oxford, where he matriculated on 10 October 1732, and graduated B.C.L. March 1745, D.C.L. June 1745. He was called to the bar at the Middle Temple in 1738, but soon abandoned it for the church, being ordained in 1742.

Almost immediately (13 August 1743) he was instituted to the rectory of Alvechurch, Worcestershire. Through his family influence he was made chaplain to George II in December 1747, installed as Dean of Exeter on 4 June 1748, and collated to a prebendal stall in Exeter Cathedral on 5 May 1748. In 1761 the Dean describes the cathedral library as having over 6,000 books and some good manuscripts. He describes the work which has been done to repair and list the contents of the manuscripts. At the same time the muniments and records had been cleaned and moved to a suitable muniment room. George Grenville, a cousin, pressed for Lyttelton's advancement. He was promoted to the see of Carlisle, and was consecrated in Whitehall Chapel on 21 March 1762, but his health was not good. He died unmarried in Clifford Street, London, on 22 December 1768, and was buried at St John the Baptist Church, Hagley, on 30 December. The chancel of that church had been ornamented in 1764 at his expense with shields of arms of his paternal ancestors.

== Works ==
Lyttelton was elected a Fellow of the Royal Society in January 1743, and Fellow of the Society of Antiquaries in 1746; and in 1765 he was promoted to be President of the Society of Antiquaries. He contributed to the Philosophical Transactions, and wrote for Archaeologia (vols. 1–3.). Rosemary Sweet writes:

Antiquaries such as Charles Lyttelton and Richard Gough played a pivotal role in establishing the systematic study of architectural history, and in their re-evaluation of the Gothic style of architecture contributed to the development of a historicist approach to the past.

== Legacy ==
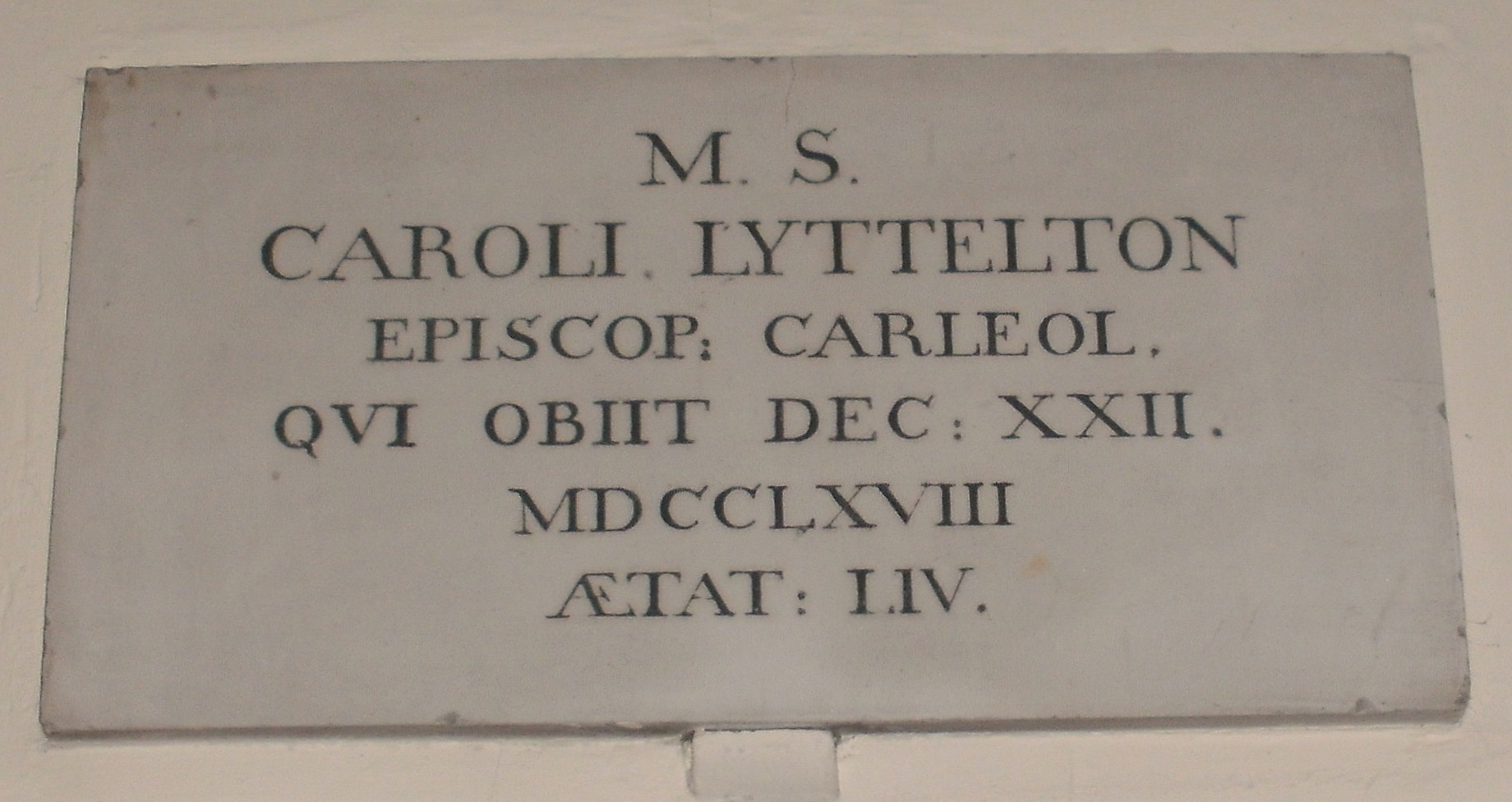
St John the Baptist Church, Hagley, memorial to Bishop Charles Lyttelton

William Borlase addressed to him his volume on Scilly (1758), Andrew Coltee Ducarel inscribed to him a work on Anglo-Norman antiquities (1767), and Samuel Pegge wrote to him an essay on the coins of Cunobelin (1766). Lyttelton bequeathed his manuscripts to the Society of Antiquaries. They formed the basis of Treadway Russell Nash's History of Worcestershire, and of the works of later writers on the county. Stebbing Shaw's History of Staffordshire was partly compiled from them, and from the same source many improvements were made in Sampson Erdeswicke's Survey of Staffordshire (1820 and 1844). Not the least of his impact was in his encouragement of his ward Samuel Hellier to study at Exeter College, Oxford, where he developed a passion for music.

Notes by the Rev. Charles Lyttelton on churches, other buildings and antiquities in various counties known as the Lyttelton Bequest at the Society of Antiquaries are of importance because, as Rosemary Sweet observed in her book Antiquaries: The Discovery of the Past in Eighteenth-Century Britain, "Charles Lyttelton was one of the first to attempt a systematic study of Saxon and Gothic architecture…" and "he put pressure upon the society to publish plates of what he took to be Saxon buildings…and supported the move to commission engravings of the illustrations of the Caedmon manuscript, chiefly because they served to illustrate Saxon architectural features". Images held in the archive of the Conway Library at The Courtauld Institute of Art, which are listed as "From 'Drawings of Saxon Churches'; collection by Lyttleton, Soc. Of Antiq.", are being digitised under the wider Courtauld Connects project.

== Notes ==
Church of England titles
Preceded by Richard Osbaldeston	Bishop of Carlisle; 1762–1768	Succeeded by Edmund Law
