= William Fellowes of Shotesham Park =

English landowner

William Fellowes F.R.S.
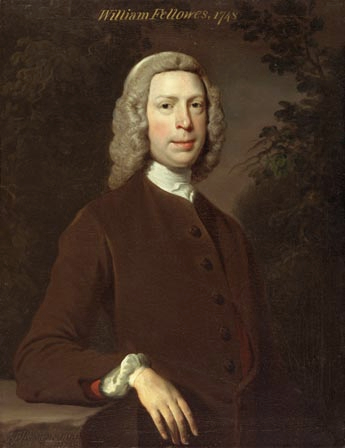
- Portrait from 1748 of William Fellowes of Shotesham Park by Joseph Highmore
- Born: 1706
- Died: 1775 (aged 68–69)
- Occupation: landowner
- Known for: Norfolk and Norwich Hospital
- Children: Robert Fellowes
- Father: William Fellowes

William Fellowes (1706–1775) of Shotesham Park was an English landowner, a founder of Norfolk and Norwich Hospital. He was elected a Fellow of the Royal Society in 1731.

== Life ==
He was the third son of the barrister William Fellowes. He acquired Shotesham Park and associated land in 1731; or was given property there amounting to 871 acres (352 ha) in the early 1720s by his father. It has been suggested that William Fellowes the elder was at the point using profit from South Sea Company investment to acquire land.

When his father died in 1724, under his will his son William received only investments, the bulk of the estate going to his elder brother Coulson Fellowes. The three brothers Coulson, Martin and William Fellowes all appear on the subscription list for Miscellanea Analytica de Seriebus et Quadraturis (1730), a mathematical work by Abraham de Moivre. Bellhouse, Renouf, Raut and Bauer deduce that, probably, their father had engaged de Moivre as a tutor to his sons.

In the years 1731 to 1754, Fellowes developed a cottage hospital in Shotesham village. Thomas Hayter, bishop of Norwich, was interested in setting up a hospital in Norwich on the London model, and consulted the physician Benjamin Gooch. Hayter died in 1761. Gooch lived in Shotesham, and he and Fellowes revived the idea in 1770. Fellowes laid a foundation stone for the Norfolk and Norwich Hospital in 1771. Notable early medical staff were Edward Rigby and Philip Meadows Martineau.

== Family ==
With his wife Elizabeth, Fellowes had two sons:

- William Fellowes (1740–1778), married Elizabeth Harris, daughter of the barrister Samuel Harris, resided at Gay Bowers, Danbury, and had two sons and two daughters. William, the elder son, died in 1835 at age 69, unmarried. The younger son was Robert Fellowes.
- Robert Fellowes, second son, inherited Shotisham Park and was a Member of Parliament.
