= Richard Osbaldeston =

British clergyman

The Right Reverend and Right Honourable Richard Osbaldeston
- Bishop of London
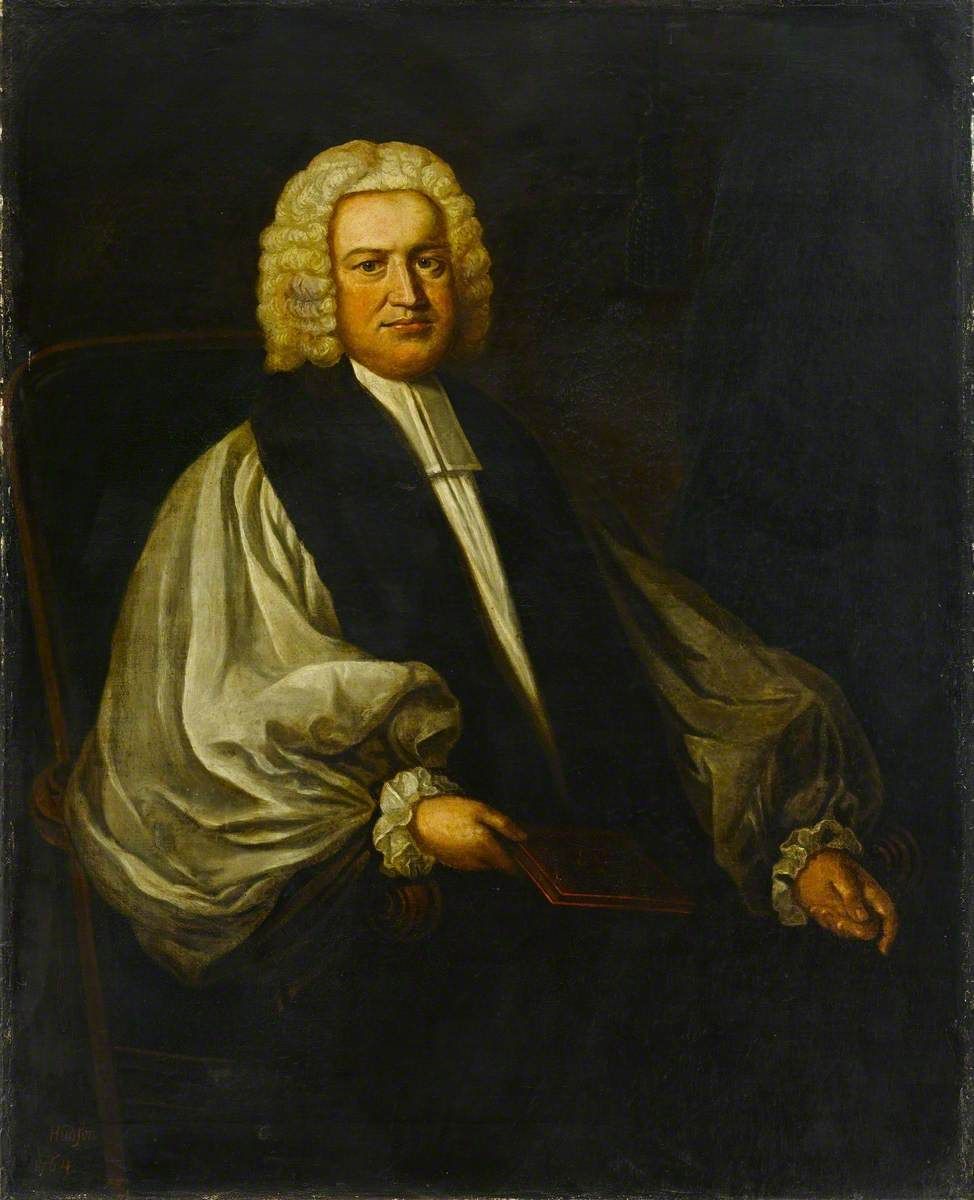
- Bishop Osbaldeston by Thomas Hudson
- Church: Church of England
- Diocese: Diocese of London
- Elected: 1762
- Term ended: 1764 (death)
- Predecessor: Thomas Hayter
- Successor: Richard Terrick
- Other posts: Bishop of Carlisle; 1747–1762

Orders
- Consecration: c. 1747

Personal details
- Born: 6 January 1691
- Died: 15 May 1764 (aged 73)
- Denomination: Anglican
- Profession: Tutor
- Education: St John's College, Cambridge

Richard Osbaldeston (6 January 1691 – 15 May 1764) was a Church of England clergyman, Bishop of Carlisle from 1747 to 1762 and Bishop of London from 1762 to 1764.

== Life ==
Osbaldeston was born at Hunmanby, Yorkshire on 6 January 1690/1, the second son of Sir Richard Osbaldeston and his second wife Elizabeth, daughter of John Fountayne of Melton, Yorkshire. Sir Richard was the head of the Yorkshire branch of an old Lancashire family, son of William Osbaldeston MP, son of Sir Richard Osbaldeston, Attorney-General for Ireland (Bishop Osbaldeston's great-grandfather). Two of Bishop Osbaldeston's brothers (William and Fountayne) went on to serve as MP for Scarborough, their grandfather's former constituency. Through his paternal grandmother Anne Wentworth, he was related to Thomas Wentworth, 1st Earl of Strafford, Lord Deputy of Ireland, with whom the Attorney-General had been closely associated.

He was educated at Beverley Grammar School, and matriculated at St John's College, Cambridge in 1707, graduating B.A. 1711, M.A. 1714, D.D. 1726. He was a Fellow of Peterhouse, Cambridge 1714–1717.

He was a chaplain to Kings George I and George II, and a tutor to King George III. In the church, he held the following positions:

- Rector of Hinderwell, North Riding of Yorkshire, 1714–47
- Vicar of Hunmanby, East Riding of Yorkshire, 1715–62
- Rector of Folkton, East Riding of Yorkshire, 1727–62
- Dean of York, 1728–47
- Bishop of Carlisle, 1747–62
- Bishop of London, 1762–64, and Dean of the Chapel Royal

He became Bishop of Carlisle in 1747. He was mostly non-resident in Carlisle, and neglected the diocese, leaving Carlisle Cathedral and the bishop's residence Rose Castle in disarray. He was not highly regarded as a bishop, but he was translated to London in 1762, "to nobody's joy that I know of" according to Richard Hurd, while Archbishop Thomas Secker considered him "in every way unequal to the situation". As Bishop of London, he objected to a plan to commemorate a former lord mayor with a statue in St Paul's Cathedral, despite Archbishop Secker's approval, on the grounds that such monuments were not part of Christopher Wren's design.

He was a patron of John Jortin.

== Notes ==
Church of England titles
Preceded by Henry Finch	Dean of York; 1728–1747	Succeeded by John Fountayne
Preceded by Sir George Fleming, Bt	Bishop of Carlisle; 1747–1762	Succeeded by Charles Lyttelton
Preceded by Thomas Hayter	Bishop of London; 1762–1764	Succeeded by Richard Terrick
