= Peter Morris (surgeon) =

Australian surgeon (1934–2022)

Professor Sir Peter Morris AC FRS FMedSci FRCP FRCS
- Born: 17 April 1934; Horsham, Victoria, Australia
- Died: 29 October 2022 (aged 88); Richmond Village, Oxfordshire, England
- Education: University of Melbourne
- Known for: Organ transplantation
- Awards: Fellow of the Royal Society; Medawar prize
- Scientific career
- Institutions: University of Oxford; Massachusetts General Hospital; University of Melbourne
- Website: www.nds.ox.ac.uk/about-nds/staff-listing/sir-peter-john-morris

Sir Peter John Morris (17 April 1934 – 29 October 2022) was an Australian surgeon and Nuffield professor of surgery at the University of Oxford. Morris was President of the Royal College of Surgeons of England, founder of the Oxford Transplant Centre and director of the Centre for Evidence in Transplantation at the Royal College of Surgeons of England.

== Education and career ==
Peter John Morris was born in Horsham, Victoria, Australia on 17 April 1934. After an education at Xavier College, Melbourne, he was a medical student at St. Vincent's Hospital and the University of Melbourne, graduating in 1957. He commenced his surgical training in Melbourne before moving to the UK and the US to complete his training.

Morris returned to Melbourne in 1968 to the University of Melbourne's Department of Surgery, becoming Reader in Surgery in 1971. In 1973, at the age of 39, he was appointed to the Nuffield Chair of Surgery at the University of Oxford. He held this post for 28 years before being elected as President of The Royal College of Surgeons of England from 2001 to 2004. On arrival in Oxford he established the transplantation program at the Oxford Transplant Centre of which he was Director. He was also the co-founder with John Bell of the Wellcome Trust Centre for Human Genetics. He served as Director of the Centre for Evidence in Transplantation (CET) at the Royal College of Surgeons and the London School of Hygiene and Tropical Medicine, where he held an honorary professorship and was a member of Court. He served as Chairman of the British Heart Foundation for 8 years and was President of the Medical Protection Society.

He was elected as a Fellow of the Royal Society in 1994 and as a Foundation Fellow of the Academy of Medical Sciences in 1998. In the USA he was elected as a Foreign Member of both the Institute of Medicine of the National Academy of Sciences (1997) and the American Philosophical Society (2002).

== Career ==
His professional scientific career has revolved around transplantation and transplantation biology, with a major interest in the immune response to histocompatibility antigens and their suppression. One of his key contributions was the discovery of cytotoxic antibodies in patients after renal transplantation and their association with graft failure. Other research interests included extensive studies of HLA and disease and the use of HLA as a genetic marker in anthropology. His clinical interests have been in transplantation and vascular surgery. He was a former President of The Royal College of Surgeons of England, The Transplantation Society (International), the British Transplantation Society, the European Surgical Association and the International Surgical Society. He was the editor of Kidney Transplantation: Principles and Practice, which is now in its 6th edition, and the widely acclaimed Oxford Textbook of Surgery, which is in its 2nd edition.

== Personal life and death ==
Morris died from bowel cancer at his home in Richmond Village, near Witney, Oxfordshire, on 29 October 2022, at the age of 88.

== Awards ==
He had been awarded numerous honorary fellowships, including those of the American Surgical Association, the American College of Surgeons, the Royal Australasian College of Surgeons, Royal College of Physicians and Surgeons of Canada, German Surgical Society, Japanese Surgical Society and the Royal Colleges of Surgeons of Edinburgh, Glasgow and Ireland, The Royal College of Physicians of Edinburgh and London as well as the Lifetime Achievement Award from the Indian Society of Transplantation. He has received an honorary DSc of Imperial College, London and the University of Hong Kong, and most recently an Honorary Doctorate of Laws of the University of Melbourne. He has served as a visiting professor in some 50 institutions and delivered over 30 eponymous lectures worldwide.

He had received a number of prizes for his work, the most prestigious of which are the Lister Medal in 1997 for his contributions to surgical science and the Medawar Prize in 2006 for his contributions to transplantation.

In 2002 he was a castaway on Desert Island Discs.

In 1996 he was knighted by the Queen for services to medicine. He was made a Companion of the Order of Australia for services to medical sciences in 2004.

Academic offices
Preceded by Barry Jackson	President of the Royal College of Surgeons of England; 2001–2004	Succeeded by Hugh Phillips
