= Benjamin Gooch =

English physician

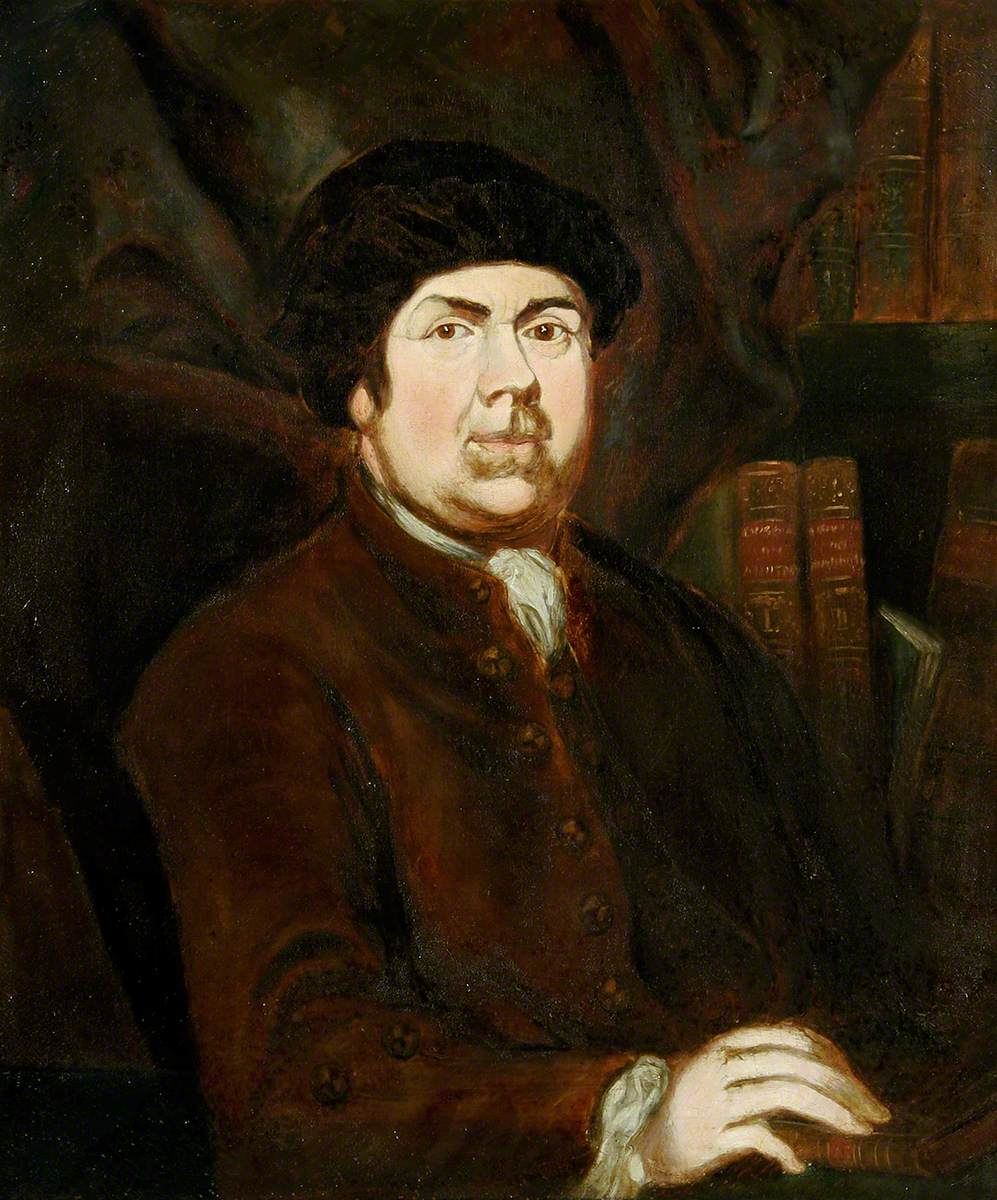
- Born: 1707-8
- Died: February 1776
- Occupation: Physician

Benjamin Gooch (1707-8 – February 1776) was an English physician and surgeon. Gooch's splint is named after him.

== Biography ==
Gooch was probably the son of Benjamin Gooch (d. 1728), rector of Ashwellthorpe, Norfolk, and his wife Anne Phyllis (d. 1701). He practised chiefly at Shotesham in Norfolk. He was appointed surgeon to the infirmary there by the founder, William Fellowes. In 1758 he published ‘Cases and Practical Remarks in Surgery,’ 8vo, London; re-issued as ‘A Practical Treatise on Wounds and other Chirurgical Subjects; to which is prefixed a short Historical Account of … Surgery and Anatomy,’ 2 vols. 8vo, Norwich, 1767. An appendix was called ‘Medical and Chirurgical Observations,’ 8vo, Lond., 1773. A collective edition of his works appeared in 3 vols. 8vo, Lond., 1792. Before 1759, at the request of Thomas Hayter, bishop of Norwich, Gooch visited all the great hospitals in London in order to observe their working, and his reports were of great service to the committee of the Norfolk and Norwich Hospital, which opened in 1771. On 9 October 1771, Gooch was chosen consulting surgeon to the hospital. Some surgical cases communicated by him to the Royal Society are in the ‘Philosophical Transactions’ (vols. lix. lxv.).
