= Lancelot Blackburne =

Archbishop of York from 1724 to 1743

The Most Reverend and Right Honourable Lancelot Blackburne
- Archbishop of York
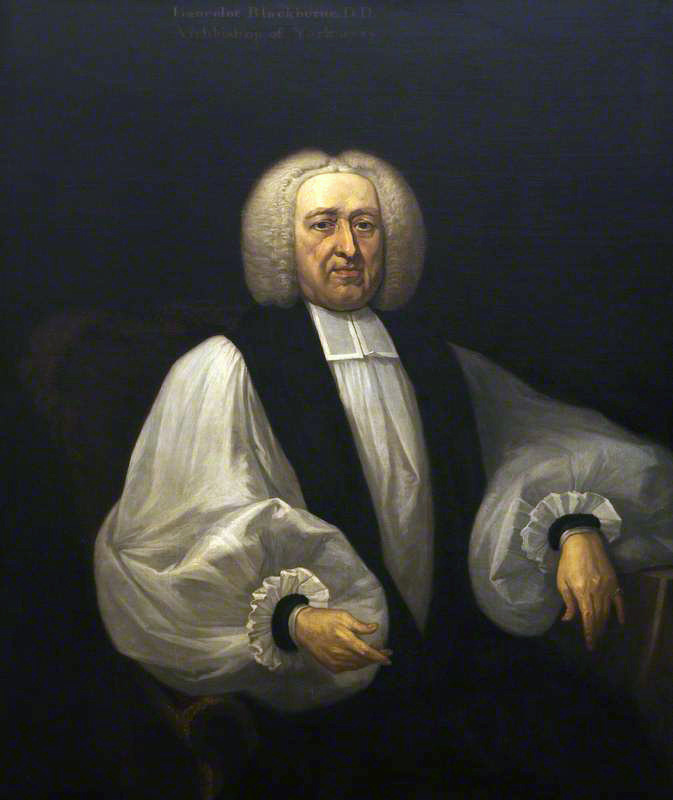
- Archbishop Blackburne (attr. Joseph Highmore)
- Province: Province of York
- Diocese: Diocese of York
- In office: 1724–1743 (death)
- Predecessor: William Dawes
- Successor: Thomas Herring
- Other posts: Dean of Exeter (1705–1717); Archdeacon of Cornwall (1715–1717); Personal chaplain to George I (1716); Bishop of Exeter (1717–1724); Lord High Almoner (1723–1743)

Orders
- Ordination: 1681 (deacon)
- Consecration: 24 February 1717 by William Wake

Personal details
- Born: 10 December 1658 London, Great Britain
- Died: 23 March 1743 (aged 84)
- Buried: St Margaret's, Westminster
- Denomination: Anglicanism
- Spouse: Catherine (m. 1684)
- Education: Westminster School; Christ Church, Oxford

Lancelot Blackburne (sometimes Blackburn, Blackborne or Blackbourn[e]; 10 December 1658 – 23 March 1743) was an English clergyman, who became Archbishop of York, and – in popular belief – a pirate.

He was described by Horace Walpole, in his Memories, as "the jolly old Archbishop of York, who had all the manners of a man of quality, though he had been a buccaneer, and was a clergyman; but he retained nothing of his first profession, except his seraglio".

== Early life and career as a pirate ==
He was born in London, a younger brother of Richard Blackburne. He attended Westminster School, and in 1676 entered Christ Church, Oxford. He graduated in 1680, was ordained a deacon on 25 September 1681 at Christ Church by John Fell, Bishop of Oxford, and travelled to the West Indies. In January 1684 he was granted an MA by the university; at this time, he is known to have been in Nevis. A popular story recounts that he spent these years sailing with buccaneers, either as their chaplain or as a pirate himself; there is little evidence either way, although a record of 1681 notes that he was paid £20 (equivalent to £3,691 in 2025) by Charles II for "secret services".

== Archbishop of York ==
He returned to England in 1684, marrying Catherine Talbot (the elder sister of William Talbot) on 2 September at the Savoy Chapel, and shortly thereafter took up the first of a set of church posts.

In 1691 he became a Canon of Exeter, and in 1705 Dean of Exeter, succeeding William Wake whose patronage would later stand him in good stead, and in 1715 Archdeacon of Cornwall. In 1716 he travelled to Hanover as the personal chaplain to George I and the next year became Bishop of Exeter. As Bishop, he was active in the House of Lords where he supported the repeal of the Occasional Conformity Act.

In 1724 he became Archbishop of York (and therefore a Privy Counsellor), a position he held until his death. While he continued to be politically active, he often neglected his spiritual duties; he appears to have carried out few confirmations, and stopped ordaining priests after 10 years. Instead, he kept apartments in Downing Street, Westminster and spent much time at the royal court. Downing Street is listed as his abode on the 1739 royal charter of the Foundling Hospital, a charity for which he was a founding governor. Blackburne was Lord High Almoner from 1723 to 1743.

His career was controversial, with rumours that he had secretly married George I to his mistress. The Dictionary of National Biography mentions "his reputation for carnality" and "the laxity of his moral precepts", while Brewer's Rogues, Villains and Eccentrics comments that "[his] behaviour was seldom of a standard to be expected of an archbishop. In many respects, his behaviour was seldom of a standard to be expected of a pirate." He was famously ejected by John Disney, the vicar of St Mary's Church, Nottingham, after a confirmation service during which he asked for his pipe, tobacco and ale. One local legend in York even claimed that Dick Turpin was his butler.

Blackburne died at his home in Downing Street on 23 March 1743 after a "lingering illness". His wife Catherine had died on 9 June 1726 at the age of 80 and they left no children. It has often been claimed that he fathered Thomas Hayter; there is no conclusive evidence either way: he did not himself identify Hayter as his son, but he did leave a sizeable portion of his estate to Hayter.

== Legacy ==
In a 1780 letter to David Dalrymple, Horace Walpole gave a lengthy description of Blackburne:

He was perfectly a fine, gentleman to the last, to eighty-four; his favourite author was Waller, whom he frequently quoted... I often dined with him, his mistress, Mrs. Conwys, sat at the head of the table, and Hayter, his natural son by another woman, and very like him, at the bottom, as chaplain: he was afterwards Bishop of London. I have heard, but do not affirm it, that Mrs. Blackbourne, before she died, complained of Mrs. Conwys being brought under the same roof. To his clergy he was, I have heard, very imperious. One story I recollect, which showed how much he was a man of this world: and which the Queen herself repeated to my father. On the King's last journey to Hanover, before Lady Yarmouth came over, the Archbishop being With her Majesty, said to her, "Madam, I have been with your minister Walpole, and he tells me that you are a wise woman, and do not mind your husband's having a mistress."

== Titles, Styles, Honours and Arms ==
- 1658–1681: Lancelot Blackburne Esq.
- 1681–1691: The Reverend Lancelot Blackburne
- 1691–1705: The Reverend Canon Lancelot Blackburne
- 1705–1717: The Very Reverend Lancelot Blackburne
- 1717–1724: The Right Reverend Lancelot Blackburne
- 1724–1743: The Most Reverend and Right Honourable Lancelot Blackburne

Coat of arms of Lancelot Blackburne
Notes When Blackburne was serving as a bishop his arms would be displayed impaled with the arms of the diocese and topped with a mitre. Escutcheon Argent a fess nebuly between three mullets Sable.

Church of England titles
Preceded by Offspring Blackall	Bishop of Exeter; 1717–1724	Succeeded by Stephen Weston
Preceded by William Dawes	Archbishop of York; 1724–1743	Succeeded by Thomas Herring
