= Independent Reconfiguration Panel =

The Independent Reconfiguration Panel (IRP) is the independent expert on National Health Service (NHS) service change in England. Set up in 2003, the IRP advises the Secretary of State for Health and Social Care on contested proposals for health service change in England. The IRP also offers informal support and guidance to the NHS and other organisations on achieving successful change. The secretary of state can refer reconfigurations to the panel for scrutiny but only after a local authority has formally referred the changes to him. He can then choose whether to adopt their advice.

The IRP is made up of experienced clinicians, managers and lay members who have wide-ranging expertise in clinical healthcare, NHS management, involving the public and patients, and handling and delivering successful changes to the NHS. The panel is led by the IRP Chair and supported by the Secretariat.

There were suggestions that the panel was to be abolished as part of the Health and Care Bill 2021, but that was not included in the legislation.
