= Norfolk and Norwich University Hospital =

- Norfolk and Norwich University Hospitals NHS Foundation Trust
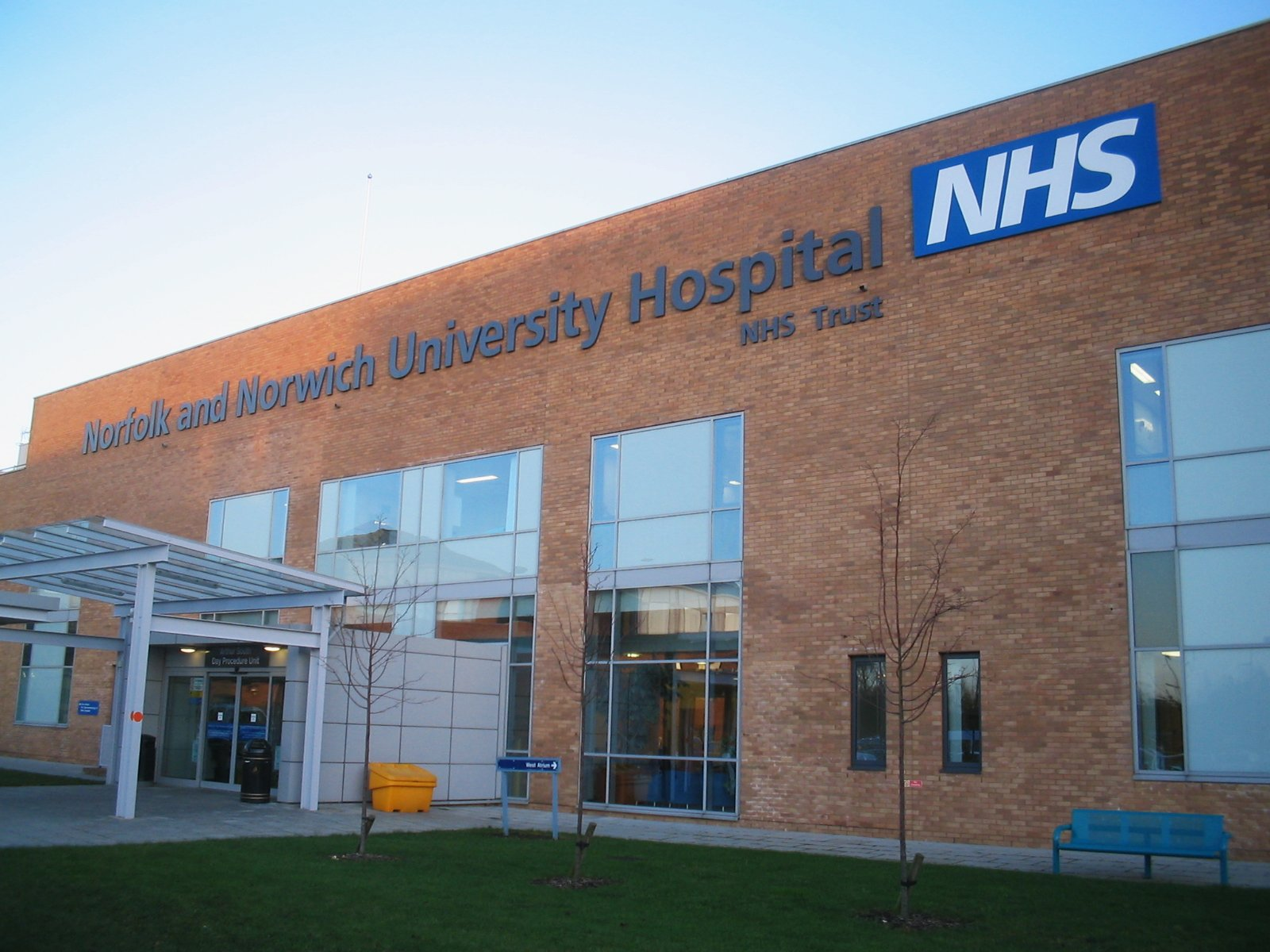
- Arthur South Day Procedure Unit entrance

- Shown in Norfolk

Geography
- Location: Colney Lane, Norwich, Norfolk, England
- Coordinates: 52.617°N 1.220°E

Organisation
- Care system: NHS England
- Type: Teaching
- Affiliated university: Norwich Medical School; University of East Anglia

Services
- Emergency department: Yes
- Beds: 1237
- Speciality: Neonatal Intensive Care, Foetal Medicine, Orthopaedics, Cancer, Plastic Surgery, Rheumatology, Ophthalmology, Paediatric Medicine and Surgery

History
- Founded: 2001

Links
- Website: www.nnuh.nhs.uk/our-services/our-hospitals/norfolk-and-norwich-university-hospital/

The Norfolk and Norwich University Hospital (NNUH) is a large National Health Service (NHS) academic teaching hospital in the Norwich Research Park on the western outskirts of Norwich, England.

The university hospital replaced the former Norfolk and Norwich Hospital, which was founded in 1771, and the West Norwich Hospital. The Norfolk and Norwich University Hospital was built under the Private Finance Initiative (PFI), and opened in late 2001: it has 1237 acute beds and offers a wide range of NHS acute health services plus private patient facilities. It is one of the largest hospitals in the United Kingdom in terms of in-patient capacity. The hospital is part of the Norfolk and Norwich University Hospitals NHS Foundation Trust.

NNUH was the first new NHS teaching hospital built in England for more than 30 years and the hospital trust is a partner with the University of East Anglia in the delivery of courses. The hospital is a teaching centre for nurses (adult and children's), midwives, doctors, radiographers, therapists and operating department practitioners. It hosts the Norwich GP speciality training scheme.

== Construction ==
On 11 January 1998, Prime Minister Tony Blair announced the go-ahead for the construction of a £214 million, 809-bed, new hospital in a broadcast from Tokyo on the BBC's Breakfast with Frost show. Site work started the following day (12 January 1998). The project was the first large PFI hospital scheme in the NHS. In July 2000 approval was given to extend the Norfolk and Norwich University Hospital with a second phase that included an additional 144 beds and took the project cost to £229 million. The Norfolk and Norwich University Hospitals NHS Foundation Trust pays the private PFI Octagon consortium in the region of £41 million a year. In 2004, the Association of Chartered Certified Accountants assessed the actual costs at £1.16 billion, or around five times the initial cost of £229 million.

Project team:

- Anshen & Allen (architect)
- John Laing plc (main contractor)
- WSP Group (structural engineer)
- Hoare Lea (services engineer)
- Serco (maintenance/support services)

The hospital was completed in August 2001, five months ahead of schedule, and on budget. The hospital won the Building Better Healthcare Award for Best Designed Hospital in September 2002. The Norfolk and Norwich University Hospital was also highly commended in the Commission for Architecture and the Built Environment Prime Minister's Better Public Building Award in 2002.

It is one of a small number of Accident and Emergency departments to benefit from Pearson Lloyd's redesign – 'A Better A&E' – which reduced aggression against hospital staff by 50 per cent. A system of environmental signage provides location-specific information for patients. Screens provide live information about how many cases are being handled and the current status of the A&E department.

== Development ==
A £4.5m radiotherapy cancer treatment unit, the Winterton Unit, at the Norfolk and Norwich University Hospital, was opened by the Duke of Gloucester in May 2014. The unit is set to increase capacity at the Norfolk and Norwich University Hospital by 25pc.

== Controversy ==
The controversial Private Finance Initiative was first introduced to the public sector under the Conservative government of John Major and the contract for NNUH, one of the first PFI hospitals, was signed in 1996. The level of subsequent potential risks and costs borne by the public sector was thought by some critics of the deal to be unacceptably high. In 2006 Edward Leigh, Conservative Member of Parliament (MP) and chairman of the Public Accounts Committee, appropriated a famous Edward Heath quote (originally used with reference to Tiny Rowland of Lonrho International) to describe the Department of Health's approach to a refinancing deal for the NNUH PFI:

"It is hard to escape the conclusion that the public sector staff managing the project were not up to the rough and tumble of negotiating refinancing proposals with the private sector ... The unacceptable face of capitalism."

The hospital neighbours the constituency of South Norfolk MP Richard Bacon, also a member of the Public Accounts Committee. Mr. Bacon wrote about the financing of the hospital on his website; "The Department of Health would not allow the hospital to include a refinancing clause in the original contract. This meant the hospital had no right to receive any proceeds from the refinancing at all, let alone the 29% share it eventually secured. And that right was only obtained by taking on huge extra potential liabilities."

In 2006/07, the trust projected a savings target of £14.8 million but recorded a surplus of £867,000 by the end of the same financial year. In 2007, the Audit Commission's "Review of the NHS financial year 2006/07" reported that the trust was delivering the best financial management of any NHS Trust in the country

In 2006, the Public Accounts Committee released report into the PFI refinancing conducted by the private Octagon Healthcare consortium, of which Innisfree Ltd owns a quarter, involved in building the Norfolk and Norwich University Hospital of "lining investors' pockets" and putting the trust at increased financial risk. The report noted that the consortium was receiving an over £80 million windfall from the deal, and the National Audit Office said that the windfall was the third it had uncovered after complaints from MPs and the public. The Consortium lengthened the NHS's repayment term from 34 to 39 years, but raising their own rate of return from 16 to 60 per cent.

== Healthcare associated infections and black alerts ==
Between 2002 and 2006 the hospital saw 65 patients die from Methicillin-resistant Staphylococcus aureus (MRSA), making it one of the ten worst hospitals in the United Kingdom in terms of deaths from the superbug. In 2006 an outbreak of a community-acquired infection Methicillin-resistant Staphylococcus Aureus on the neonatal intensive care unit at the hospital, resulted in five babies carrying the organism and possibly contributing to the death of one baby.

The hospital was placed on black alert in November 2007 when it ran out of beds for a time. Ambulances were forced to queue outside the building while non-urgent patients were discharged to free up beds and a major incident emergency plan implemented. In March 2011 several wards in the hospital were closed as a result of an outbreak of the community infection Norovirus.

In 2011, a Care Quality Commission inspection found that the hospital was in the moderate concern category with regards to nutritional screening. The inspection report stated "People who use the service can be assured that they will be provided with respect, dignity and privacy by the staff during their stay in hospital. However, we observed that some improvements were needed". In March 2014 the N&N, Norfolk's biggest hospital, marked two years of being MRSA free.

== Performance ==
In December 2019 the hospital was unable to provide a safe service for patients. Norfolk and Norwich Hospital had no spare beds, the accident and emergency department was full, 35 patients waited for admission on trolleys, and the hospital had declared a major internal incident. The Trust told senior doctors, "We would like you to know that the trust will support you in making difficult decisions that may be the least unsafe decision, and we would appreciate your cooperation over the coming days with this". Dr Julia Patterson, a spokeswoman for EveryDoctor, which campaigns to improve doctors' working conditions, said the trust's message meant "optimal care is unavailable now for some NHS patients [because] 'the least unsafe option' is the best we can offer. When hospitals are so full that there are no intensive care beds, no hospital beds at all, and essential operations are being cancelled because there's simply no one to do the surgery, then every option carries undue risk".

== People and NNUH ==
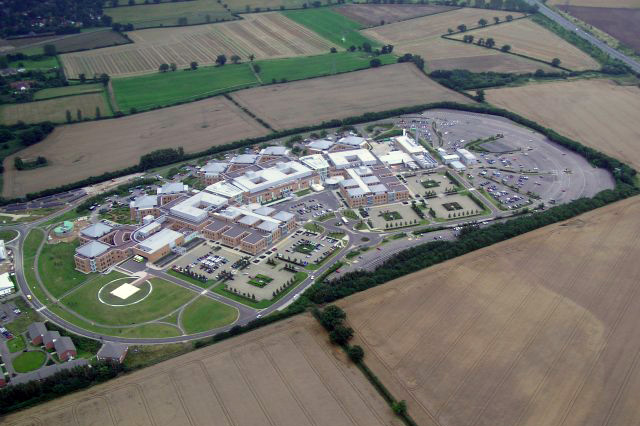
Norfolk and Norwich University Hospital from the air

The Norfolk and Norwich University Hospital has been visited by a number of notable people in public life:

- September 1998, Secretary of State for Health Frank Dobson unveiled a plaque marking foundation work on the Norfolk and Norwich University Hospital
- September 2001, Health Minister Lord Hunt of Kings Heath attended the handover ceremony where the keys to the Norfolk and Norwich University Hospital were given to the trust by the builders
- May 2002, Prime Minister Tony Blair visited the Norfolk and Norwich University Hospital and was shown a pioneering Radiology digital imaging system and visited the Coronary Care Unit
- December 2002, food critic and TV presenter Loyd Grossman visited the Norfolk and Norwich University Hospital to raise awareness of the importance of good hospital food
- December 2002, Actor Chris Rankin, who plays Percy Weasley in the Harry Potter films, visited the Norfolk and Norwich University Hospital's children's ward to help spread the hand hygiene message.
- January 2003, Norway's ambassador to the UK, Tarald Brautaset, visited the medical school complex at the Norfolk and Norwich University Hospital in a visit marking links with the county and the Trondheim area of Norway.
- September 2003 National cancer director Professor Mike Richards formally opened the £20 million Colney Centre for Oncology and Haematology patients at the Norfolk and Norwich University Hospital.
- February 2004, The Queen formally opened the Norfolk and Norwich University Hospital, visiting Medicine for the Elderly patients and staff on Holt ward and meeting staff in the Radiology department
- March 2004, President of the Royal College of Physicians Professor Dame Carol Black visited the Norfolk and Norwich University Hospital's pioneering Emergency Assessment Unit
- May 2004, Health Minister Rosie Winterton visited patients and staff in the hospital's Critical Care Complex and Emergency Assessment Unit
- February 2006, President of the Royal College of Radiologists Professor Janet Husband formally opened the Norwich Radiology Academy in the Cotman Centre
- May 2006, the Department of Health's Chief Medical Officer Sir Liam Donaldson visited the Norwich Radiology Academy to meet the radiology academy team and trainees
- June 2006, Secretary of State for Health Patricia Hewitt visited the Norfolk and Norwich University Hospital to meet staff and union representatives
- June 2007, Journalist and TV presenter Esther Rantzen visited the Norfolk and Norwich University Hospital to promote the use of the Liverpool Care of the Dying Pathway for terminal patients
- July 2007, Actors Stephen Fry and Richard Briers took part in location filming for the second series of Kingdom (ITV) at the Norfolk and Norwich University Hospital
- November 2007, the Archbishop of Canterbury, the Most Rev Dr Rowan Williams, visited the hospital's Chaplaincy team and the Neonatal Intensive Care Unit
- January 2009, Neighbours actress Caitlin Stasey, appearing at the Theatre Royal, Norwich, in the pantomime Snow White, visited the children's ward at the Norfolk and Norwich University Hospital
- March 2009, The Bishop of Thetford, the Right Revd David John Atkinson, visited the Norfolk and Norwich University Hospital's renal unit. Rhonwen Washford, one of the staff nurses on Langley Ward at the NNUH, had recently been ordained and the Bishop had expressed an interest in her work at the hospital

== See also ==
- List of hospitals in England
