= Norfolk and Norwich Hospital =

- Norfolk and Norwich University Hospitals NHS Trust
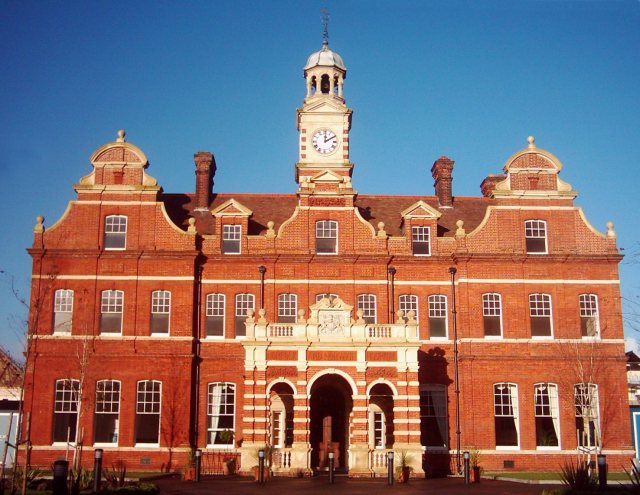
- Original Norfolk and Norwich Hospital

- Location within Norfolk

Geography
- Location: Norwich, Norfolk, England, United Kingdom
- Coordinates: 52.6229°N 1.2863°E

Organisation
- Care system: NHS England
- Type: General hospital

History
- Founded: 1771
- Closed: 2003

Links
- Lists: Hospitals in England

The Norfolk and Norwich Hospital stood on a site in St Stephen's Road, Norwich, Norfolk, England. Founded in 1771, it closed in 2003 after its services had been transferred to the new Norfolk and Norwich University Hospital. Many of the buildings were then demolished and replaced by housing.

== History ==
=== Construction and expansion ===
The Norfolk and Norwich Hospital was founded in 1771 as a charitable institution for the care of "the poor and the sick" and was established by William Fellowes of Shotesham Park and Benjamin Gooch. A new hospital designed by Edward Boardman and Thomas Henry Wyatt in the pavilion layout opened on the same site in 1883.

The Norfolk and Norwich Eye Infirmary, which had been founded in 1822 by physicians Lewis Evans and Robert Hull and the surgeon, Thomas Martineau, moved to the St Stephen's Road site in 1913.

During the First World War the Norfolk and Norwich cared for servicemen and in February 1915 a new ward, the Eastern Daily Press (EDP) ward, was opened. An ear, nose and throat building was built in 1930 and a maternity and gynecology building was added in 1935. The Second World War saw the hospital bombed on a number of occasions, including in April 1942, during the German Baedeker Blitz, and the site was severely damaged by bombing on 27 June. As a result of the June 1942 raid, four wards and the main operating theatres were destroyed.

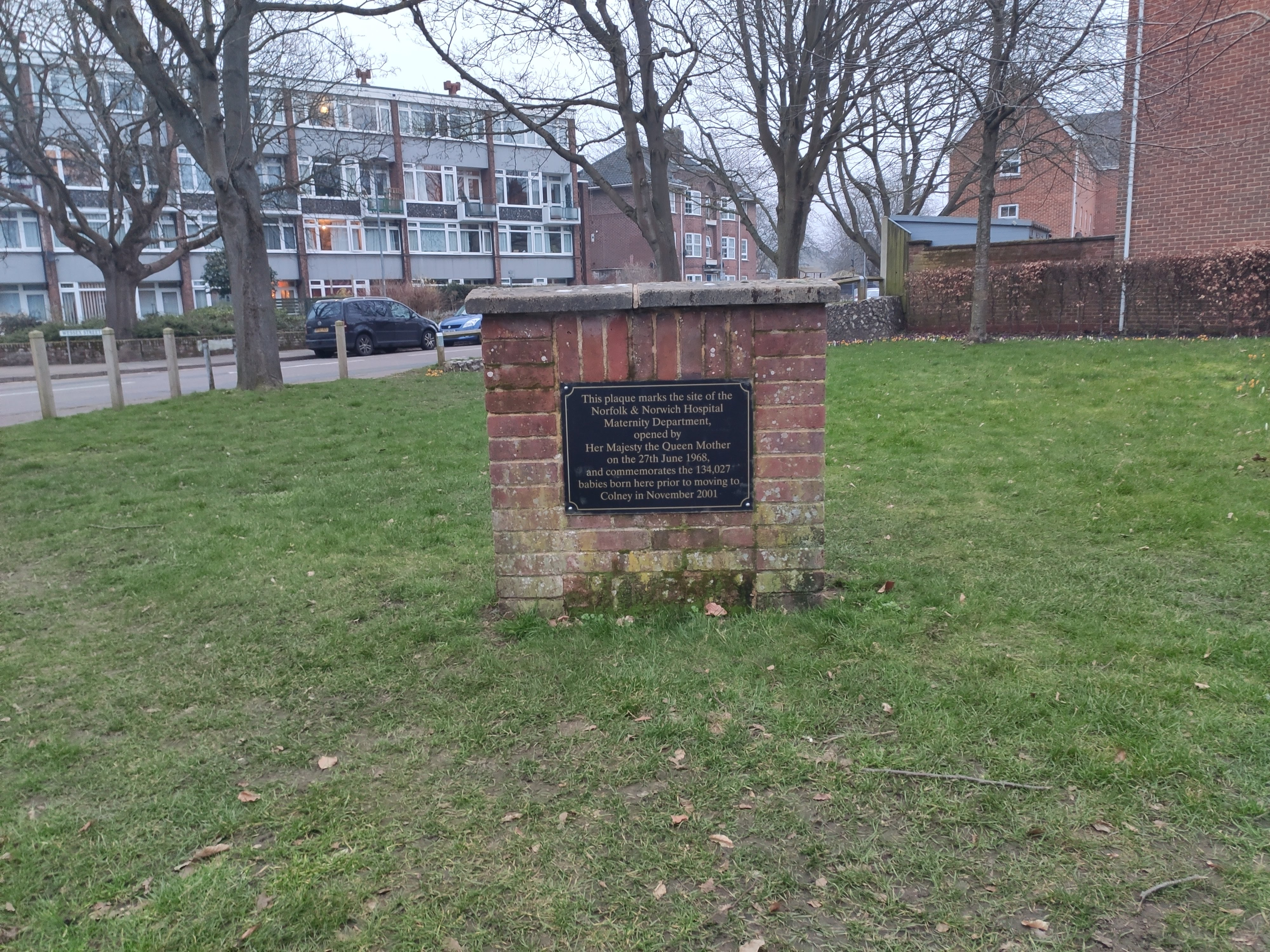
A plaque marking the site of the Maternity Department

In 1948 the National Health Service was founded and the Norfolk and Norwich Hospital became an NHS hospital. Major expansion took place at the Norfolk and Norwich Hospital in the late 1960s with the construction of a ten-storey maternity block, opened by the Queen Mother in 1968. A new main ward block, diagnostic and treatment area, and a teaching centre were all built in the 1970s.

=== Closure and demolition ===
By late 2001 most of the clinical services had left the Norfolk and Norwich Hospital for the new university hospital on the Norwich Research Park with the last departments vacating the site in January 2003.

In October 2002 a thanksgiving service was held at Norwich Cathedral to mark the contribution the Norfolk and Norwich Hospital and its staff had made over the centuries. Around 800 staff, patients and visitors attended the service of thanksgiving for the old hospital.

The Department of Health sold the old site to developer Persimmon Homes and the site was redeveloped as Fellowes Plain. The medical tradition was commemorated in the Fellowes Plain street names, which were named after notable Norfolk and Norwich Hospital figures: Sarah West Close (after the hospital's first matron), Thomas Wyatt Close (an architect of the 1883 building), Edward Jodrell Plain (a major benefactor), Benjamin Gooch Way (surgeon and hospital founder), Phillipa Flowerday Plain (first known industrial nurse) and Kenneth McKee Plain (surgeon famed for hip replacements).

== Notable doctors ==
- Jasper Blaxland (1880–1963), consultant general surgeon 1925 to 1946
