= Norfolk and Norwich University Hospitals NHS Foundation Trust =

Healthcare trust in England

- Type: NHS foundation trust
- Headquarters: Colney Lane; Norwich; NR4 7UY
- Hospitals: Cromer Hospital; Norfolk and Norwich University Hospital
- Staff: 7,866
- Website: www.nnuh.nhs.uk

Norfolk and Norwich University Hospitals NHS Foundation Trust is an NHS Foundation Trust which runs Cromer Hospital and Norfolk and Norwich University Hospital, both in Norfolk, England. The trust was first established on 8 February 1994 as the Norfolk and Norwich Health Care NHS Trust and authorised as the Norfolk and Norwich University Hospitals NHS Foundation Trust on 1 May 2008.

In 2000 the Government announced that a joint venture bid with the University of East Anglia to have a medical school and university hospital in Norwich had been successful. As a result, the trust had been established as the Norfolk and Norwich University Hospital NHS Trust on 18 January 2001.

== Education ==
The trust is a joint venture partner in University of East Anglia's School of Medicine, Health Policy and Practice, including undergraduate and postgraduate medical education. A five-year MB/BS programme began in September 2002 with an intake of over 160 students a year.

There are strong links with the University of East Anglia (UEA) centred in the medical school with the appointment of Chairs in Primary Care, Education, Epidemiology, Cancer Studies. The medical school has close links with Health Economics, Clinical Psychology, Clinical Epidemiology, and the School of Biological Sciences where there is a Chair in Cancer Studies.

The trust is also home to the Norwich Radiology Academy one of only three national Radiology training centres established jointly by the Department of Health and Royal College of Radiologists.

The UEA School of Nursing and Midwifery's Edith Cavell building on the Norfolk and Norwich University Hospital campus opened in 2006. This provides teaching facilities for Nursing and Midwifery education.

== Development ==
The trust was one of the biggest beneficiaries of Boris Johnson's announcement of capital funding for the NHS in August 2019, with an allocation of £69.7 million for new diagnostic centres in Norwich, Great Yarmouth and Kings Lynn. In July 2022 the trust was planning a very substantial increase in patient-initiated follow-up appointments, which could replace half of its outpatient follow-up list. DrDoctor is providing a patient engagement service for the project, and Infinity Health is supplying software which will send alerts to clinicians about patients who have not responded to prompts or questionnaires.

== Performance ==
In June 2018 after a Care Quality Commission (CQC) inspection it was put into special measures after inspectors rated the trust leadership inadequate, found a "bullying culture" and an "obvious deterioration" in services. In May 2019, the CQC rated the hospital as "Requires improvement" overall and in most subcategories.

== See also ==
- List of NHS trusts
