= Thomas A. Smith =

Thomas A. Smith may refer to:

- Thomas Alexander Smith (1850–1932), American politician
- Thomas Assheton Smith I (1752–1828), English landowner and all-round sportsman
- Thomas Assheton Smith II (1776–1858), English landowner and all-round sportsman
- Thomas Adams Smith, United States Army officer
