= Thomas Assheton Smith =

Thomas Assheton Smith may refer to:

- Thomas Assheton Smith (1752–1828), English landowner and sportsman
- Thomas Assheton Smith (1776–1858), his son, English landowner and sportsman
