= Lord William Paget =

British naval commander and politician (1803–1873)

Captain Lord William Paget

Member of Parliament for Carnarvon
- In office 1826-1830

Personal details
- Born: 1 March 1803
- Died: 17 May 1873 (aged 70)
- Party: Whig
- Spouse: Frances de Rottenburg (m. 1827)
- Parents: Henry Paget (father); Caroline Campbell (mother)
- Relatives: Henry Paget (brother); Clarence Paget (half-brother); Alfred Paget (half-brother); George Paget (half-brother); Charles Paget (uncle); George Villiers (grandfather); Frances Villiers (grandmother)
- Military career
- Branch: Royal Navy
- Rank: Captain
- Commands: HMS Royal Charlotte

Captain Lord William Paget (1 March 1803 – 17 May 1873) was a British naval commander and Whig politician.

== Biography ==
Paget was the second son of Field Marshal Henry Paget, 1st Marquess of Anglesey, by his first wife Lady Caroline Elizabeth, daughter of George Villiers, 4th Earl of Jersey, and Frances Villiers, Countess of Jersey. He was the brother of Henry Paget, 2nd Marquess of Anglesey and the half-brother of Lord Clarence Paget, Lord Alfred Paget and Lord George Paget. Paget served in the Royal Navy and achieved the rank of Captain. He also served as the Member of Parliament (MP) for Carnarvon from 1826 to 1830 (succeeding his uncle Sir Charles Paget) and Andover from 1841 to 1847.

He was made a post captain in the Royal Navy on 18 October 1826, and was appointed captain of the vice-regal yacht HMS Royal Charlotte in November 1827 on a salary of £1,200, by the duke of Clarence for the duration of Paget's fathers, Irish lord lieutenancy.

In 1828 he spoke in the House of Commons on the subject of Roman Catholic emancipation.

Paget married Frances, daughter of Lieutenant-General Francis de Rottenburg, Baron de Rottenburg, in 1827. They had several children, including William Henry Paget, a Major-General in the Indian Army. Paget died in May 1873, aged 70. Lady William Paget survived him by two years and died in May 1875.

== See also ==
- O'Byrne, William Richard (1849). "Paget, William" . A Naval Biographical Dictionary . John Murray – via Wikisource.
- Sykes, Christopher Simon (1982). Black Sheep. Chatto & Windus. ISBN 0-7011-2548-9.

Parliament of the United Kingdom
Preceded by Hon. Sir Charles Paget	Member of Parliament for Carnarvon; 1826–1830	Succeeded by William Ormsby-Gore
Preceded by Ralph Etwall; Sir John Pollen, Bt	Member of Parliament for Andover; 1841–1847; With: Ralph Etwall	Succeeded by Henry Beaumont Coles; William Cubitt
