= Henry Arthur Wallop Fellowes =

English Whig and Liberal politician

Henry Arthur Wallop Fellowes (29 October 1799 – 17 February 1847) was an English Whig and Liberal politician who sat in the House of Commons from 1831 to 1835

Fellowes was born at Eggesford, Devon, the son of Newton Fellowes, 4th Earl of Portsmouth and his first wife Frances Ferrard, daughter of the Rev. Castel Ferrard. He was educated at Eton College and was admitted to Trinity College, Cambridge on 19 June 1816. He migrated to Trinity Hall, Cambridge on 23 October 1818 and was awarded MA in 1820.

At the 1831 general election Fellowes was elected member of parliament for Andover. He held the seat until 1835.

Fellowes died, unmarried, at the age of 47. He had for some years been in charge of the care and the estates of his uncle, John Wallop, 3rd Earl of Portsmouth, who had been judged insane by the Commissioners in Lunacy. Elizabeth Foyster, in her book about the earl, writes that Henry's obituary ignores the sacrifice of his life to family interests: the stigma of having a lunatic in the family "meant that Henry's years of service to his family had no mention".

Parliament of the United Kingdom
Preceded by Thomas Assheton Smith II; Sir John Pollen	Member of Parliament for Andover; 1831–1835; With: Ralph Etwall	Succeeded by Ralph Etwall; Sir John Pollen
