= 1901 Andover by-election =

UK parliamentary by-election

The 1901 Andover by-election was held on 26 August 1901 after the death of the incumbent Conservative MP Bramston Beach. The seat was retained by the Conservative candidate Edmund Faber.

Andover by-election, 1901
Party	Candidate	Votes	%	±%
Conservative	Edmund Faber	3,696	51.6	N/A
Liberal	George Judd	3,473	48.4	New
Majority		223	3.2	N/A
Turnout		7,169	75.8	N/A
Registered electors		9,460		
Conservative hold		Swing	N/A	
