= Lockhart Gordon =

British Indian officer

Lieutenant Colonel Hon. Lockhart Gordon (1732 – 24 March 1788) was an aristocrat, army officer and colonial administrator in India who served as Judge-Advocate-General of Bengal.

== Career ==
Gordon was born the third son of John Gordon, 3rd Earl of Aboyne and his wife Grace Lockhart, daughter of George Lockhart of Lee and Lady Euphemia Montgomerie. Initially he studied for the bar however he eventually entered the army and became a lieutenant-colonel. Whilst in the army he served in India at which point he was appointed Judge-Advocate-General of Bengal in 1787.

== Personal life ==
Gordon married first Isabella, the daughter of Elias Levi on 25 April 1753, however she died on 17 March 1754 without issue. His second wife was the Hon. Catherine Wallop who he married on 3 October 1770, she was daughter of the politician John Wallop, Viscount Lymington and his wife Catherine Conduitt, daughter of John Conduitt of Cranbury Park, Hampshire and Catherine Barton the niece of Sir Isaac Newton. Her father, Lord Lymington was the eldest son and heir of John Wallop, 1st Earl of Portsmouth however he predeceased his father. Gordon and his second wife Catherine had three children together:

- Caroline Gordon (1772 – 13 December 1801), married Lt.-Col. William James, son of Charles James and Catherine Napier
- Rev. Lockhart Gordon
- Loudon Harcourt Gordon, an officer in the Royal Artillery

Gordon died in Calcutta, India on 24 March 1788.
