= Manor of Halliwick =

Coordinates: 51°36′45.18″N 0°9′31.44″W

The Manor of Halliwick was an historic manor in Friern Barnet, Middlesex, England,

The Halliwick manor house was built around 1602 and located near the crossroads at Colney Hatch, on the corner between Colney Hatch Lane and Woodhouse Road. The modern flats and shops known as Halliwick Court are now located on the site.

It was once in the ownership of John Trott MP.
