= Andover (constituency) =

Former parliamentary constituency in the United Kingdom

- Former borough constituency for the House of Commons

1586–1885
- Seats: two (1586–1868); one (1868–1885)

Hampshire, Western or Andover Division
- Former county constituency for the House of Commons

1885–1918
- Seats: one
- Replaced by: Basingstoke and Winchester

Andover was the name of a constituency of the House of Commons of the Parliament of England from 1295 to 1307, and again from 1586, then of the Parliament of Great Britain from 1707 to 1800 and of the Parliament of the United Kingdom from 1801 to 1918. It was a parliamentary borough in Hampshire, represented by two Members of Parliament until 1868, and by one member from 1868 to 1885. The name was then transferred to a county constituency electing one MP from 1885 until 1918.

== History ==
The parliamentary borough of Andover, in the county of Hampshire (or as it was still sometimes known before about the eighteenth centuries, Southamptonshire), sent MPs to the parliaments of 1295 and 1302–1307. It was re-enfranchised as a two-member constituency in the reign of Elizabeth I of England. It elected MPs regularly from 1586.

The House of Commons decided, in 1689, that the elective franchise for the seat was limited to the twenty four members of the Andover corporation and not the freemen of the borough. This ruling was confirmed after another disputed election in 1727. Matthew Skinner and Abel Kettleby received the most votes, from many householders, but James Brudenell and Charles Colyear (Viscount Milsington) were declared elected for winning the most support from corporation members. Under the Reform Act 1832 the electorate was expanded by allowing householders, whose property was valued at £10 or more, to vote. There were 246 registered electors in 1832.

From the 1868 United Kingdom general election the constituency returned one member. The electorate was further extended, in 1868, to 775 registered electors.

Apart from the period between 1653 and 1658, Andover continued to be represented as a borough constituency until that was abolished in 1885. Immediately thereafter, from the 1885 United Kingdom general election, the town of Andover was combined with surrounding rural territory to form a county division of Hampshire, known formally as the Western or Andover division. The registered electorate for the expanded seat was 9,175 in 1885, and 9,460 in 1901.

The constituency was abolished in 1918, when the Municipal Borough of Andover and Andover Rural District were included in the Basingstoke seat.

== Boundaries ==
The constituency was based on the northern Hampshire town of Andover.

The Parliamentary Boundaries Act 1832 (2 & 3 William IV, c. 64) defined the seat as "the respective parishes of Andover and Knights Enham, and the tithing of Foxcot". The boundaries were left unaltered, until the end of the borough constituency in 1885.

Under the Redistribution of Seats Act 1885, the county division was defined as including the Sessional Divisions of Andover, and Kingsclere; with parts of the Sessional Divisions of Winchester, Romsey, and Basingstoke, and the Municipal Boroughs of Andover and Winchester, and the parish of Coombe, Hampshire in the Hungerford Sessional Division of Berkshire.

== Members of Parliament ==
The Roman numerals after some names are to distinguish different members for this constituency, with the same name. It is not suggested this use of Roman numerals was applied at the time.

- In this section by-elections are indicated by an asterisk after the date.

=== Parliament of England 1586-1707 (two members) ===
As there were sometimes significant gaps between Parliaments held in this period, the dates of first assembly and dissolution are given. Where the name of the member has not yet been ascertained or (before 1558) is not recorded in a surviving document, the entry unknown is entered in the table.

| Elected | Assembled | Dissolved | First Member | Second Member |
|---|---|---|---|---|
| 1586 | 13 October 1586 | 23 March 1587 | Edwin Sandys | James Hawley |
| 1588 | 4 February 1589 | 29 March 1589 | Thomas Temple | Henry Reade |
| 1593 | 18 February 1593 | 10 April 1593 | Miles Sandys | Edward Barker |
| 1597 | 24 October 1597 | 9 February 1598 | Edward Reynolds | Edward Phelips |
| 1601 | 27 October 1601 | 19 December 1601 | Henry Ludlow | Nicholas Hyde |
| 1604 | 19 March 1604 | 9 February 1611 | Sir Thomas Jermyn | Thomas Antrobus |
| 1614 | 5 April 1614 | 7 June 1614 | Richard Venables | Peter Noyes |
| 1620 or 1621 | 16 January 1621 | 25 August 1621 | Richard Venables | John Shuter |
| 1621 | 22 November 1621 | 8 February 1622 | Robert Wallop | John Shuter |
| 1623 or 1624 | 12 February 1624 | 27 March 1625 | Robert Wallop | John Shuter |
| 1625 | 17 May 1625 | 12 August 1625 | Sir Henry Wallop | Henry Shuter |
| 1626 | 6 February 1626 | 15 June 1626 | Lord Henry Paulett | John Shuter |
| 1628 | 17 March 1628 | 10 March 1629 | Robert Wallop | Ralph Conway |
| 1640 | 13 April 1640 | 5 May 1640 | Robert Wallop | Sir Richard Wynn |
| 1640 | 3 November 1640 | 5 December 1648 | Robert Wallop | Sir Henry Rainsford |
| 1641 * | 3 November 1640 | 5 December 1648 | Robert Wallop | Henry Vernon |
| 3 May 1642 | 3 November 1640 | 5 December 1648 | Robert Wallop | Sir William Waller |
| | 6 December 1648 | 20 April 1653 | Robert Wallop | Seat vacant |
| 1653 | 4 July 1653 | 12 December 1653 | unrepresented | |
| 1654 | 3 September 1654 | 22 January 1655 | John Duns | |
| 1656 | 17 September 1656 | 4 February 1658 | Thomas Hussey | |
| 1658 or 1659 | 27 January 1659 | 22 April 1659 | Colonel Gabriel Beck | Robert Gough |
| N/A | 7 May 1659 | 20 February 1660 | Robert Wallop | Seat vacant |
| N/A | 21 February 1660 | 16 March 1660 | Robert Wallop | Sir William Waller |
| 1660, April 20 | 25 April 1660 | 29 December 1660 | Sir John Trott, Bt | John Collins |
| 1661 | 8 May 1661 | 24 January 1679 | Sir John Trott, Bt | John Collins |
| 1673, January 31 * | 8 May 1661 | 24 January 1679 | Sir Kingsmill Lucy, Bt | John Collins |
| 1678, October 29 * | 8 May 1661 | 24 January 1679 | Charles West | John Collins |
| 1679, February 11 | 6 March 1679 | 12 July 1679 | Francis Powlett | William Wither |
| 1679, August 14 | 21 October 1680 | 18 January 1681 | Francis Powlett | Sir Robert Henley |
| 1681, March 4 | 21 March 1681 | 28 March 1681 | Charles West | Sir John Collins |
| 1685, March 16 | 19 May 1685 | 2 June 1687 | Robert Phelips | Sir John Collins |
| 1689, January 14 | 22 January 1689 | 6 February 1690 | Francis Powlett | John Pollen II |
| 1690, March 3 | 20 March 1690 | 11 October 1695 | Francis Powlett (Whig) | John Pollen II (Tory) |
| 1695, October 30 | 22 November 1695 | 6 July 1698 | John Smith (Whig) | Sir Robert Smyth, Bt (Whig) |
| 1698, July 21 | 24 August 1698 | 19 December 1700 | John Smith (Whig) | Anthony Henley (Whig) |
| 1701, January 14 | 6 February 1701 | 11 November 1701 | John Smith (Whig) | Francis Shepheard (Whig) |
| 1701, November 25 | 30 December 1701 | 2 July 1702 | John Smith (Whig) | Francis Shepheard (Whig) |
| 1702, July 16 | 20 August 1702 | 5 April 1705 | John Smith (Whig) | Francis Shepheard (Whig) |
| 1705, May 11 | 14 June 1705 | 1707 | John Smith (Whig) | Francis Shepheard (Whig) |

=== 1707–1868 (two members) ===
| Date | First member | First party | Second member | Second party |
|---|---|---|---|---|
| 1707, October 23 | John Smith | Whig | Francis Shepheard | Whig |
| 1708, May 6 | John Smith | Whig | William Guidott | Whig |
| 1713, August 25 | Sir Ambrose Crowley | Tory | William Guidott | Whig |
| 1714, March 30 * | Gilbert Searle | Tory | William Guidott | Whig |
| 1715, January 29 * | John Wallop | | William Guidott | Whig |
| 1715, April 1 | James Brudenell | | William Guidott | Whig |
| 1727, August 23 | James Brudenell | | Viscount Milsington | |
| 1730, January 20 * | James Brudenell | | William Guidott | Whig |
| 1734, April 25 | John Pollen III | Whig | William Guidott | Whig |
| 1741, May 5 | John Pollen III | Whig | Hon. John Wallop | Whig |
| 1749, November 28 * | John Pollen III | Whig | Sir John Griffin | |
| 1754, April 16 | Sir Francis Blake Delaval | | Sir John Griffin | |
| 1768, March 21 | Benjamin Lethieullier | | Sir John Griffin | |
| 1784, August 11 * | Benjamin Lethieullier | | William Fellowes | |
| 1796, May 25 | Benjamin Lethieullier | | Hon. Coulson Wallop | |
| 1797, December 14 * | Thomas Assheton Smith I | Tory | Hon. Coulson Wallop | |
| 1802, July 5 | Thomas Assheton Smith I | Tory | Hon. Newton Fellowes | Whig |
| 1820, March 8 | Thomas Assheton Smith I | Tory | Sir John Pollen, 2nd Bt | Tory |
| 1821, May 11 * | Thomas Assheton Smith II | Tory | Sir John Pollen, 2nd Bt | Tory |
| 1831, May 2 | Henry Arthur Wallop Fellowes | Whig | Ralph Etwall | Whig |
| 1835, January 8 | Sir John Pollen, 2nd Bt | Conservative | Ralph Etwall | Whig |
| 1841, June 29 | Lord William Paget | Whig | Ralph Etwall | Whig |
| 1847, July 29 | Henry Beaumont Coles | Conservative | William Cubitt | Conservative |
| 1857, March 28 | Hon. Dudley Fortescue | Whig | William Cubitt | Conservative |
| 1859 | Hon. Dudley Fortescue | Liberal | William Cubitt | Conservative |
| 1861, July 29 * | Hon. Dudley Fortescue | Liberal | Henry Beaumont Coles | Conservative |
| 1862, December 17 * | Hon. Dudley Fortescue | Liberal | William Cubitt | Conservative |
| 1863, November 18 * | Hon. Dudley Fortescue | Liberal | William Humphery | Conservative |
| 1867, February 11 * | Hon. Dudley Fortescue | Liberal | Sir John Burgess Karslake | Conservative |
| 1868 | constituency reduced to one member | | | |

- In this sub-section Liberal MPs elected before the formal founding of the Liberal Party, in 1859, are indicated by a + symbol after the party name.

=== 1868-1918 (one member) ===
| Year | Member | Party | Note |
|---|---|---|---|
| 1868 | Hon. Dudley Fortescue | Liberal | |
| 1874 | Henry Wellesley | Conservative | |
| 1880 | Francis Buxton | Liberal | |
| 1885 | Bramston Beach | Conservative | Re-elected unopposed 1886, 1892, 1895, 1900; died 3 August 1901 |
| 1901 | Edmund Faber | Conservative | |
| 1906 | Walter Faber | Conservative | Last MP for the constituency |
| 1918 | constituency abolished | | |

== Elections ==
=== Elections in the 1830s ===
General election 1830: Andover
| Party | Candidate | Votes | % | ±% |
|---|---|---|---|---|
| Tory | Thomas Assheton Smith | Unopposed | | |
| Tory | John Pollen | Unopposed | | |
| Tory hold | | | | |
| Tory hold | | | | |

General election 1831: Andover
| Party | Candidate | Votes | % | ±% |
|---|---|---|---|---|
| Whig | Henry Arthur Wallop Fellowes | Unopposed | | |
| Whig | Ralph Etwall | Unopposed | | |
| Whig gain from Tory | | | | |
| Whig gain from Tory | | | | |

General election 1832: Andover
| Party | Candidate | Votes | % | ±% |
|---|---|---|---|---|
| Whig | Henry Arthur Wallop Fellowes | Unopposed | | |
| Whig | Ralph Etwall | Unopposed | | |
| Registered electors | | 246 | | |
| Whig hold | | | | |
| Whig hold | | | | |

General election 1835: Andover
| Party | Candidate | Votes | % | ±% |
|---|---|---|---|---|
| Whig | Ralph Etwall | 149 | 38.0 | N/A |
| Conservative | John Pollen | 108 | 27.6 | New |
| Whig | William Nightingale | 100 | 25.5 | N/A |
| Conservative | Edward Rose Tunno | 35 | 8.9 | New |
| Turnout | | 209 | 87.1 | N/A |
| Registered electors | | 240 | | |
| Majority | | 41 | 10.4 | N/A |
| Whig hold | | Swing | N/A | |
| Majority | | 8 | 2.1 | N/A |
| Conservative gain from Whig | | Swing | N/A | |

General election 1837: Andover
| Party | Candidate | Votes | % | ±% |
|---|---|---|---|---|
| Whig | Ralph Etwall | Unopposed | | |
| Conservative | John Pollen | Unopposed | | |
| Registered electors | | 265 | | |
| Whig hold | | | | |
| Conservative hold | | | | |

=== Elections in the 1840s ===
General election 1841: Andover
| Party | Candidate | Votes | % | ±% |
|---|---|---|---|---|
| Whig | Ralph Etwall | 131 | 37.6 | N/A |
| Whig | William Paget | 112 | 32.2 | N/A |
| Conservative | John Pollen | 105 | 30.2 | N/A |
| Majority | | 7 | 2.0 | N/A |
| Turnout | | 213 | 91.0 | N/A |
| Registered electors | | 234 | | |
| Whig hold | | Swing | N/A | |
| Whig gain from Conservative | | Swing | N/A | |

General election 1847: Andover
| Party | Candidate | Votes | % | ±% |
|---|---|---|---|---|
| Conservative | Henry Beaumont Coles | 134 | 31.8 | +16.7 |
| Conservative | William Cubitt | 121 | 28.7 | +13.6 |
| Whig | John Newton Fellowes | 107 | 25.4 | −12.2 |
| Whig | Thomas Chaloner Smith | 60 | 14.2 | −18.0 |
| Majority | | 14 | 3.3 | N/A |
| Turnout | | 211 (est) | 86.8 (est) | −4.2 |
| Registered electors | | 243 | | |
| Conservative gain from Whig | | Swing | +15.9 | |
| Conservative gain from Whig | | Swing | +14.4 | |

=== Elections in the 1850s ===
General election 1852: Andover
| Party | Candidate | Votes | % | ±% |
|---|---|---|---|---|
| Conservative | William Cubitt | 140 | 49.8 | +21.1 |
| Conservative | Henry Beaumont Coles | 121 | 43.1 | +11.3 |
| Whig | John Curling | 20 | 7.1 | −32.5 |
| Majority | | 101 | 36.0 | +32.7 |
| Turnout | | 151 (est) | 62.4 (est) | −24.4 |
| Registered electors | | 241 | | |
| Conservative hold | | Swing | +18.7 | |
| Conservative hold | | Swing | +13.8 | |

General election 1857: Andover
| Party | Candidate | Votes | % | ±% |
|---|---|---|---|---|
| Conservative | William Cubitt | 143 | 39.2 | −10.6 |
| Whig | Dudley Fortescue | 120 | 32.9 | +25.8 |
| Conservative | Henry Beaumont Coles | 102 | 27.9 | −15.2 |
| Turnout | | 183 (est) | 78.3 (est) | +15.9 |
| Registered electors | | 233 | | |
| Majority | | 23 | 6.3 | −29.7 |
| Conservative hold | | Swing | −11.8 | |
| Majority | | 18 | 5.0 | N/A |
| Whig gain from Conservative | | Swing | +25.8 | |

General election 1859: Andover
| Party | Candidate | Votes | % | ±% |
|---|---|---|---|---|
| Conservative | William Cubitt | 153 | 39.5 | +0.3 |
| Liberal | Dudley Fortescue | 120 | 31.0 | −1.9 |
| Conservative | Richard William Johnson | 114 | 29.5 | +1.6 |
| Turnout | | 194 (est) | 81.0 (est) | +2.7 |
| Registered electors | | 239 | | |
| Majority | | 33 | 8.5 | +2.2 |
| Conservative hold | | Swing | +0.6 | |
| Majority | | 6 | 1.5 | −3.5 |
| Liberal hold | | Swing | +1.3 | |

=== Elections in the 1860s ===
Cubitt resigned to contest the 1861 by-election at City of London, causing a by-election.

By-election, 29 Jul 1861: Andover
| Party | Candidate | Votes | % | ±% |
|---|---|---|---|---|
| Conservative | Henry Beaumont Coles | Unopposed | | |
| Conservative hold | | | | |

Coles' death caused a by-election.

By-election, 17 Dec 1862: Andover
| Party | Candidate | Votes | % | ±% |
|---|---|---|---|---|
| Conservative | William Cubitt | Unopposed | | |
| Conservative hold | | | | |

Cubitt's death caused a by-election.

By-election, 18 Nov 1863: Andover
| Party | Candidate | Votes | % | ±% |
|---|---|---|---|---|
| Conservative | William Humphery | 130 | 61.0 | −8.0 |
| Liberal | John Clarke Hawkshaw | 83 | 39.0 | +8.0 |
| Majority | | 47 | 22.0 | +13.5 |
| Turnout | | 213 | 87.3 | +6.3 |
| Registered electors | | 244 | | |
| Conservative hold | | Swing | −8.0 | |

General election 1865: Andover
| Party | Candidate | Votes | % | ±% |
|---|---|---|---|---|
| Conservative | William Humphery | Unopposed | | |
| Liberal | Dudley Fortescue | Unopposed | | |
| Registered electors | | 255 | | |
| Conservative hold | | | | |
| Liberal hold | | | | |

Humphery resigned, causing a by-election.

By-election, 11 Feb 1867: Andover
| Party | Candidate | Votes | % | ±% |
|---|---|---|---|---|
| Conservative | John Burgess Karslake | Unopposed | | |
| Conservative hold | | | | |

Karslake was appointed Attorney General for England and Wales, requiring a by-election.

By-election, 22 Jul 1867: Andover
| Party | Candidate | Votes | % | ±% |
|---|---|---|---|---|
| Conservative | John Burgess Karslake | Unopposed | | |
| Conservative hold | | | | |

The seat was reduced to one member.

General election 1868: Andover
| Party | Candidate | Votes | % | ±% |
|---|---|---|---|---|
| Liberal | Dudley Fortescue | 377 | 55.1 | N/A |
| Conservative | Henry Wellesley | 307 | 44.9 | N/A |
| Majority | | 70 | 10.2 | N/A |
| Turnout | | 684 | 88.3 | N/A |
| Registered electors | | 775 | | |
| Liberal hold | | Swing | N/A | |

=== Elections in the 1870s ===
General election 1874: Andover
| Party | Candidate | Votes | % | ±% |
|---|---|---|---|---|
| Conservative | Henry Wellesley | 395 | 60.4 | +15.5 |
| Liberal | Dudley Fortescue | 259 | 39.6 | −15.5 |
| Majority | | 136 | 20.8 | N/A |
| Turnout | | 654 | 85.6 | −2.7 |
| Registered electors | | 764 | | |
| Conservative gain from Liberal | | Swing | +15.5 | |

=== Elections in the 1880s ===
General election 1880: Andover
| Party | Candidate | Votes | % | ±% |
|---|---|---|---|---|
| Liberal | Francis Buxton | 405 | 52.7 | +13.1 |
| Conservative | Henry Wellesley | 364 | 47.3 | −13.1 |
| Majority | | 41 | 5.4 | N/A |
| Turnout | | 769 | 92.3 | +6.7 |
| Registered electors | | 833 | | |
| Liberal gain from Conservative | | Swing | +13.1 | |

General election 1885: Andover
| Party | Candidate | Votes | % | ±% |
|---|---|---|---|---|
| Conservative | Bramston Beach | 4,559 | 59.5 | +12.2 |
| Liberal | Francis Buxton | 3,108 | 40.5 | −12.2 |
| Majority | | 1,451 | 19.0 | N/A |
| Turnout | | 7,667 | 83.6 | −8.7 |
| Registered electors | | 9,175 | | |
| Conservative gain from Liberal | | Swing | +12.2 | |

General election 1886: Andover
| Party | Candidate | Votes | % | ±% |
|---|---|---|---|---|
| Conservative | Bramston Beach | Unopposed | | |
| Conservative hold | | | | |

=== Elections in the 1890s ===
General election 1892: Andover
| Party | Candidate | Votes | % | ±% |
|---|---|---|---|---|
| Conservative | Bramston Beach | Unopposed | | |
| Conservative hold | | | | |

General election 1895: Andover
| Party | Candidate | Votes | % | ±% |
|---|---|---|---|---|
| Conservative | Bramston Beach | Unopposed | | |
| Conservative hold | | | | |

=== Elections in the 1900s ===
General election 1900: Andover
| Party | Candidate | Votes | % | ±% |
|---|---|---|---|---|
| Conservative | Bramston Beach | Unopposed | | |
| Conservative hold | | | | |

1901 Andover by-election
| Party | Candidate | Votes | % | ±% |
|---|---|---|---|---|
| Conservative | Edmund Faber | 3,696 | 51.6 | N/A |
| Liberal | George Judd | 3,473 | 48.4 | New |
| Majority | | 223 | 3.2 | N/A |
| Turnout | | 7,169 | 75.8 | N/A |
| Registered electors | | 9,460 | | |
| Conservative hold | | Swing | N/A | |

General election 1906: Andover
| Party | Candidate | Votes | % | ±% |
|---|---|---|---|---|
| Conservative | Walter Faber | 4,603 | 50.4 | N/A |
| Liberal | George Judd | 4,524 | 49.6 | N/A |
| Majority | | 79 | 0.8 | N/A |
| Turnout | | 9,127 | 87.6 | N/A |
| Registered electors | | 10,423 | | |
| Conservative hold | | Swing | N/A | |

=== Elections in the 1910s ===
General election January 1910: Andover
| Party | Candidate | Votes | % | ±% |
|---|---|---|---|---|
| Conservative | Walter Faber | 6,127 | 62.2 | +11.8 |
| Liberal | P Wodehouse | 3,723 | 37.8 | −11.8 |
| Majority | | 2,404 | 24.4 | +23.6 |
| Turnout | | 9,850 | 86.6 | −1.0 |
| Conservative hold | | Swing | +11.8 | |

General election December 1910: Andover
| Party | Candidate | Votes | % | ±% |
|---|---|---|---|---|
| Conservative | Walter Faber | Unopposed | | |
| Conservative hold | | | | |

General Election 1914–15:

Another General Election was required to take place before the end of 1915. The political parties had been making preparations for an election to take place and by July 1914, the following candidates had been selected;

- Conservative: Walter Faber
- Liberal:
