= Sir John Pollen, 2nd Baronet =

British politician

Sir John Pollen Bt
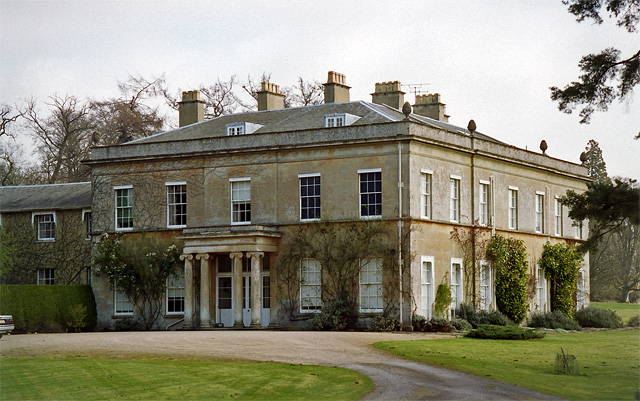
- Redenham Park, Hampshire

Member of Parliament for Andover
- In office 8 January 1835 – 29 June 1841 Serving with Ralph Etwall
- Preceded by: Henry Arthur Wallop Fellowes; Ralph Etwall
- Succeeded by: Ralph Etwall; William Paget
- In office 8 March 1820 – 2 May 1831 Serving with Thomas Assheton Smith II (1821–1831); Thomas Assheton Smith I (1820–1821)
- Preceded by: Thomas Assheton Smith I Newton Fellowes
- Succeeded by: Henry Arthur Wallop Fellowes; Ralph Etwall

Personal details
- Born: 6 April 1784
- Died: 2 May 1863 (aged 79)
- Party: Conservative/Tory

Sir John Walter Pollen, 2nd Baronet of Redenham (6 April 1784 – 2 May 1863) was a British Conservative and Tory politician.

He was the eldest son of Sir John Pollen, 1st Baronet of Redenham Park, Hampshire and educated at Eton (1799) and Christ Church, Oxford (1803) after which he entered Lincoln's Inn to study law (1806). He succeeded in 1814 to the baronetcy and the Redenham estate, upon the death of his father.

He was commissioned as a Captain in the South Hampshire Light Infantry Militia on 21 February 1810, transferring to the North Hampshire Militia as Major on 4 August 1812, before returning to the South Hants as Lieutenant-Colonel on 2 June 1814. In the years after the Battle of Waterloo the Militia remained disembodied apart from occasional training. On 25 June 1827 he was promoted to Colonel of the South Hants regiment, many months after the previous incumbent had died. He remained in titular command until the regiment disappeared in the militia reorganisation of 1853.

Pollen was elected MP for Andover at the 1820 general election and held the seat until 1831 when he did not seek re-election. He returned to the seat in 1835 and held it again until 1841, when he stood but was defeated.

He married in 1819, Charlotte Elizabeth, the daughter of Rev. John Craven of Chilton Foliat, Wiltshire, but left no children. Upon his death in 1863 he was succeeded in the baronetcy by his nephew Sir Richard Hungerford Pollen, 3rd Baronet. Redenham passed to his widow and on her death in 1877 to the son of the 3rd Baronet, also Richard Hungerford Pollen, later the 4th Baronet.

Parliament of the United Kingdom
Preceded by Thomas Assheton Smith I Newton Fellowes	Member of Parliament for Andover; 1820–1831; With: Thomas Assheton Smith II (1821–1831); Thomas Assheton Smith I (1820–1821)	Succeeded by Henry Arthur Wallop Fellowes; Ralph Etwall
Preceded by Henry Arthur Wallop Fellowes; Ralph Etwall	Member of Parliament for Andover; 1835–1841; With: Ralph Etwall	Succeeded by Ralph Etwall; William Paget
Baronetage of Great Britain
Preceded by John Pollen	Baronet (of Redenham); 1814–1863	Succeeded by Richard Hungerford Pollen
