= Thomas Assheton Smith (1776–1858) =

British cricket player and politician

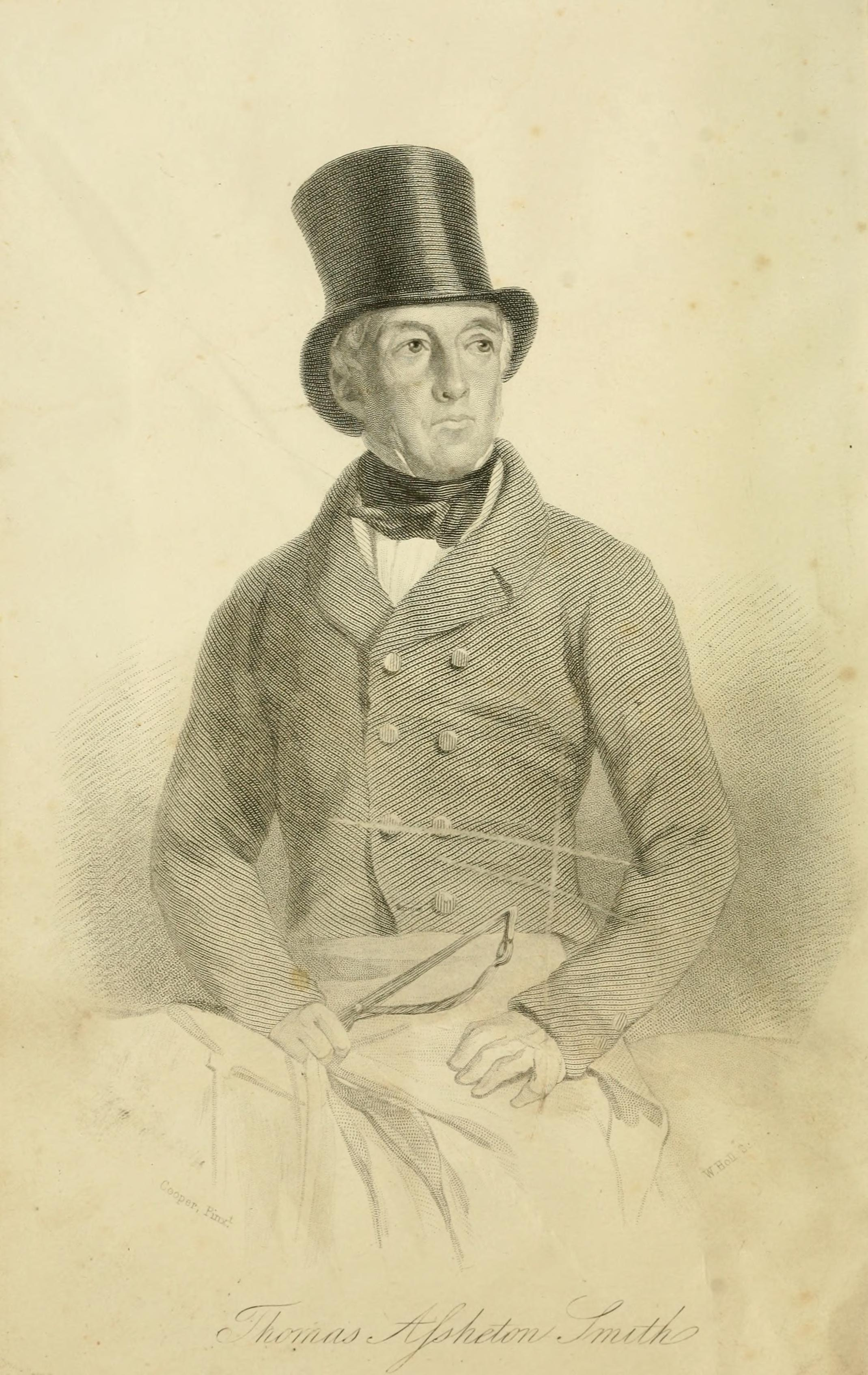
- Thomas Assheton Smith

Member of Parliament for Caernarvonshire
- In office 1832–1837
- Preceded by: Charles Griffith-Wynne
- Succeeded by: John Ormsby-Gore

Member of Parliament for Andover
- In office 1821–1831 Serving with Sir John Pollen, 2nd Baronet
- Preceded by: Thomas Assheton Smith I Sir John Pollen, 2nd Baronet
- Succeeded by: Henry Arthur Wallop Fellowes; Ralph Etwall

Personal details
- Born: 2 August 1776 Westminster, London
- Died: 9 September 1858 (aged 82) Vaynol Park, Bangor
- Spouse: Matilda Webber (m. 1827)
- Parent(s): Thomas Assheton Smith I Elizabeth Wynn
- Education: Eton College
- Alma mater: Christ Church, Oxford

Thomas Assheton Smith (the younger) (2 August 1776 – 9 September 1858) was an English landowner and all-round sportsman who was notable for being one of the outstanding amateur cricketers of the early 19th century. He was a Tory politician who sat in the House of Commons from 1821 to 1837. He was also known for his pioneering work on the design of steam yachts in conjunction with the Scottish marine engineer Robert Napier.

== Early life ==
Smith was born in Queen Anne Street, Cavendish Square, Westminster, London. He was the second son of Elizabeth (née Wynn) Smith and Thomas Assheton Smith I (1752–1828), who made his fortune in the Welsh slate industry and was a noted patron of cricket in the early years of Marylebone Cricket Club (MCC) from the 1787 English cricket season. He had five sisters and an elder brother, John, who was expelled from the family after marrying a servant, paving the way for Thomas to become his father's heir. His younger brother, William, saw action at Trafalgar on HMS Temeraire but drowned in 1806.

Smith was educated at Eton between 1783 and 1794, eventually playing for the school's cricket team. He went on to Christ Church, Oxford where he joined the Bullingdon Club and was a prominent member of its team in 1796.

== Career ==
Smith was elected Member of Parliament representing Andover in 1821 and held the seat until 1831; at the 1832 general election he was elected MP for Caernarvonshire and held the seat until 1837. He was High Sheriff of Wiltshire in 1838.

=== Cricket career ===
Smith was a hard hitting right-handed batsman and made 45 known appearances in important matches up to the 1820 season. His career spanned the Napoleonic Wars which had a detrimental effect on the game and so reduced his opportunities for playing.

Smith played for the Gentlemen in the inaugural and second Gentlemen v Players matches in 1806.

According to Scores & Biographies (S&B), Smith "being a good hard hitter was pretty successful". He was also, says S&B, a "crack" shot and a "mighty hunter" who acquired the name of the "British Nimrod". In the contemporary scorecards, he is generally shown as "T A Smith, Esq." whereas his father was usually recorded as "A Smith, Esq."

=== Foxhunting ===
From 1806 to 1816, Smith was Master of the Quorn Hunt in Leicestershire, then from 1816 to 1824 of the Burton hounds in Lincolnshire. He established his pack at Penton, near Andover, Hampshire, in 1826. In 1834 he bought many of Sir Thomas Burghley's hounds and in 1842 the whole pack of the Duke of Grafton. He hunted his hounds four days a week and sometimes had two packs out on the same day. In 1830, after the death of his father, he moved his stable and kennels to Tedworth House, also in Hampshire.

=== Yachting ===
Assheton Smith spent summers at his Vaynol Park estate in North Wales, on the shore of the Menai Strait and close to the family's slate quarries at Dinorwic. He had several sailing yachts built, then in 1829 engaged Scottish engineer and shipbuilder Robert Napier to build the first of what would become eight steam yachts, which were among the first vessels of their kind. Assheton Smith contributed to their design, in particular seeking an efficient hull design to maximise speed.

== Personal life ==
On 29 October 1827, Smith married Matilda Webber (d. 1859) of Berkshire. They had no children. During his ownership of the Tedworth estate, the house was rebuilt in ornate classical style.

Smith died at Vaynol Park, Bangor, Caernarvonshire on 9 September 1858 and was buried at Tedworth, where he lived in his later years. His widow died the following year on 18 May 1859.

== Bibliography ==
- Arthur Haygarth, Scores & Biographies, Volume 1 (1744–1826), Lillywhite, 1862.
- Eardley-Wilmot, Sir John E (1893) [1859]. A Famous Fox Hunter. Reminiscences of the late Thomas Assheton Smith, Esq., or The Pursuits of an English Country Gentleman (5th and cheaper ed.). London: Sampson Low, Marston & Co – via Internet Archive.

Parliament of the United Kingdom
| Preceded by Thomas Assheton Smith I Sir John Pollen, 2nd Baronet | Member of Parliament for Andover; 1821–1831; With: Sir John Pollen, 2nd Baronet | Succeeded by Henry Arthur Wallop Fellowes; Ralph Etwall |
| Preceded by Charles Griffith-Wynne | Member of Parliament for Caernarvonshire; 1832–1837 | Succeeded by John Ormsby-Gore |
