= John Wallop, Viscount Lymington =

British politician (1718–1749)

John Wallop Viscount Lymington
- Viscount Lymington
- Arms of the Earls of Portsmouth
- Born: 3 August 1718
- Died: 19 November 1749 (aged 31)
- Offices: Member of Parliament
- Spouse: Catherine Conduitt (m. 1740; died 1749)
- Issue Detail: John Wallop, 2nd Earl of Portsmouth; Henry Wallop; Barton Wallop; Bennet Wallop; Catharine Wallop; Jemima Wallop
- Parents: John Wallop, 1st Earl of Portsmouth; Lady Bridget Bennet

John Wallop, Viscount Lymington (3 August 1718 – 19 November 1749) was a British politician, styled Hon. John Wallop from 1720 to 1743.

== Early life ==
The eldest son of John Wallop, 1st Viscount Lymington, Wallop was educated at Winchester School from 1731 to 1734 and at Christ Church, Oxford in 1735. From 1739 to 1740, he was mayor of Lymington.

== Family ==
On 8 July 1740, he married Catherine Conduit (d. 15 April 1750), the daughter of John Conduitt and great-niece of Isaac Newton, by whom he had four sons and two daughters:

- John Wallop, 2nd Earl of Portsmouth (1742–1797), who succeeded his grandfather as Earl of Portsmouth
  - Lady Urania Annabella Wallop, died 17 Dec 1844
  - Lady Henrietta Dorothea Wallop, died 10 Jun 1862
  - John Charles Wallop, 3rd Earl of Portsmouth, born 18 Dec 1767, died 14 Jul 1853, married firstly, Hon. Grace Norton, daughter of Fletcher Norton, 1st Baron Grantley, and Grace Chapple, he married secondly, Mary Anne Hanson, daughter of John Hanson (the marriage was annulled in 1828)
  - Newton Fellowes, 4th Earl of Portsmouth, born 26 Jun 1772, died 9 Jan 1854, married firstly Frances Sherard, daughter of Reverend Castell Sherard, he married, secondly, Lady Catherine Fortescue, daughter of Hugh Fortescue, 1st Earl Fortescue and Hester Grenville
- Hon. Henry Wallop (d. 1794), a Groom of the Bedchamber
- Hon. Rev. Barton Wallop (3 January 1744 – 1 September 1781), married Camilla Powlett Smith in 1771 and had issue, Master of Magdalene College, Cambridge
  - Urania Catharine Camilla Wallop, born 23 Nov 1774, died 2 Jan 1815, married Reverend Henry Wake, son of Rev. Dr. Charles Wake and Barbara Beckford, daughter of William Beckford
  - Major William Barton Wallop, born 24 Dec 1781, died Dec 1824, married Elizabeth Ward, daughter of Major Ward
- Hon. Bennet Wallop (29 January 1745 – 12 February 1815), married and had issue
- Hon. Catharine Wallop (3 January 1746 – May 1813), married on 3 October 1770 Lt.-Col. Hon. Lockhart Gordon, son of John Gordon, 3rd Earl of Aboyne and had issue
  - Caroline Gordon, born 1772, died 13 December 1801, married Lt Col. William James, son of Lt Col Charles James and Catherine Napier, daughter of Sir Gerrard Napier, 5th Baronet
  - Reverend Lockhart Gordon
  - Loudon Harcourt Gordon
- Hon. Jemima Wallop (b. 14 April 1750)

== Parliamentary career ==
In 1741, Wallop was returned to Parliament on his family's interest for Andover; he and John Pollen defeated William Guidott and John Pugh, the former a local official and former MP who had gotten himself disliked by the Andover corporation. Wallop was likewise returned for Whitchurch, where he had inherited an interest through his wife, but chose to sit for Andover.

He sat as a Whig, supporting Robert Walpole's administration, and voted for Giles Earle in his unsuccessful candidacy for chairman of the Committee of Privileges and Elections that year. He abstained from the vote to investigate Walpole's conduct in 1742. In 1743, his father (who had lost a number of local offices in Hampshire on Walpole's fall), was created Earl of Portsmouth, and Wallop adopted the style of Viscount Lymington. He voted against the Carteret Ministry in 1744 on their bill to hire Hanoverian troops for the War of the Austrian Succession. Lymington was considered a supporter of the Pelham government in 1747, when he and Pollen were returned for Andover without a contest. Lymington died in late 1749, in the life of his father.

Parliament of Great Britain
Preceded by William Guidott; John Pollen	Member of Parliament for Andover; 1741–1749; With: John Pollen	Succeeded by John Pollen; John Griffin
Preceded by John Selwyn; John Mordaunt	Member of Parliament for Whitchurch; 1741–1742; With: John Selwyn	Succeeded by John Selwyn; William Sloper
