= John Collins (Andover MP) =

English academic and politician

John Collins (11 July 1624 – 1711) was an English academic and politician who sat in the House of Commons in two periods between 1660 and 1689.

Collins was the son of the theologian Samuel Collins. He was a King's Scholar at Eton College and was admitted at King's College, Cambridge on 30 January 1639. He was also admitted at Gray's Inn on 14 May 1639. In 1643 he was awarded BA and became a Fellow of his college, remaining until 1653. He was awarded MA in 1646. After 1653 he travelled.

In 1660, Collins was elected Member of Parliament for Andover in the Convention Parliament. He was re-elected MP for Andover in 1661 for the Cavalier Parliament and sat until 1679. He was re-elected MP for Andover in March 1681 and sat until 1689. He was knighted at Windsor Castle on 14 June 1681. In 1683, he was awarded LLD.

Collins was of Chute Lodge, Wiltshire and died at the age of 86.
