= William Guidott =

English lawyer and Whig politician

William Guidott (1671–1745), of Laverstoke and Preston Candover, Hampshire, was an English lawyer and Whig politician who sat in the House of Commons between 1708 and 1741.

== Early life ==
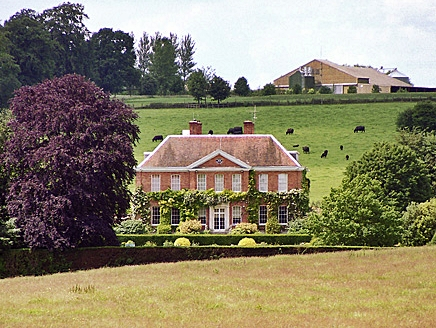
Preston House at Preston Candover, built for William Guidott.

Guidott was the eldest son of William Guidott of Wootton St Lawrence, Hampshire and his first wife Grace. He matriculated at New Inn Hall, Oxford University, on 22 March 1685, aged 14, and on 10 November 1686 became a student of Lincoln's Inn. In 1698, he succeeded his father and like his father was Steward of Andover, serving from 1703 for the rest of his life. He married Jane Hunt, daughter of James Hunt of Popham, Hampshire by licence dated 1 July 1706. In 1707 he succeeded his uncle Anthony Guidott as lawyer to the Marlborough family.

== Career ==
Guidott was returned unopposed as Whig Member of Parliament for Andover at the 1708 British general election. He voted in favour of naturalizing the Palatines in 1709, and voted for the impeachment of Dr Sacheverell in 1710. He married, as his second wife, Jane Child, daughter of Sir Francis Child, on 6 May 1710. At the 1710 British general election, he was returned unopposed again. He voted for the motion of ‘No Peace Without Spain’ on 7 December 1711, and voted against the French commerce bill on 18 June 1713. He was returned for Andover in a contest at the 1713 British general election.

Guidott was returned as a Whig again at the 1715 British general election and voted with the Administration on the septennial bill in 1716 and voted for the Peerage Bill. He became bencher of his Inn in 1719. At the 1722 British general election, he was again returned for Andover. In 1727 he was sued in Chancery by the Duchess of Marlborough for the recovery of £9,547, which she claimed he had embezzled. He was ordered to pay £5,494, which on appeal was increased by £754. At the 1727 British general election he lost his seat at Andover, after he had quarrelled with the corporation. He was returned for Andover again at a by-election on 20 January 1730. He voted with the Opposition in every recorded division He was returned unopposed at the 1734 British general election. At the 1741 British general election.

Guidott married, as his third wife, Patience Soper, daughter of John Soper of Preston Candover, Hampshire, on 30 November 1739. They lived in Preston House, which he built at Preston Candover near Basingstoke and at Andover. He left no children and on the death of his wife in 1749 Preston Candover passed to their kinsman and heir William Woodroffe, who adopted the name of Guidott.

Parliament of Great Britain
Preceded by John Smith; Francis Shepheard	Member of Parliament for Andover; 1708–1727; With: John Smith; Sir Ambrose Crowley; Gilbert Searle; John Wallop; James Brudenell	Succeeded by James Brudenell; Viscount Milsington
Preceded by James Brudenell; Viscount Milsington	Member of Parliament for Andover; 1730–1741; With: James Brudenell; John Pollen	Succeeded by John Pollen; Hon. John Wallop
