= John Pollen (died 1775) =

British lawyer and Whig politician

John Pollen (c. 1702–1775), of Andover, Hampshire, was a British lawyer and Whig politician who sat in the House of Commons from 1734 to 1754.

Pollen was the third son of John Pollen, MP of Andover, and his third wife Mary Sherwood, daughter of Edward Sherwood of East Hendred, Berkshire. He was admitted at Lincoln's Inn on 28 November 1718 and matriculated at Corpus Christi College, Oxford on 17 October 1719, aged 17. In 1726, he was called to the bar. He married Hester St John, daughter of Ellis St. John (formerly Mews) of Farley and Dogmersfield Park, Hampshire on 8 July 1731.

Pollen was a practising lawyer. At the 1734 British general election, he was returned as a Whig Member of Parliament for Andover on his own interest. He voted with the Administration in all recorded divisions, except on the place bill of 1740, when he was absent. At the 1741 British general election, he was elected MP for Andover in a contest. In 1742 he was appointed 2nd justice on the Carmarthen circuit. He became a bencher of his Inn in 1746. At the 1747 British general election he was returned unopposed again for Andover. In 1749 he applied to Hardwicke to become chief justice of his circuit, and was awarded the post in 1753. He did not stand at the 1754 British general election.

Pollen was Chief Justice for the rest of his life, and died on 24 July 1775. He left two sons and four daughters.

Parliament of Great Britain
| Preceded by James Brudenell; William Guidott | Member of Parliament for Andover; 1734–1754; With: William Guidott 1734-1741; Hon. John Wallop 1741-1749; Sir John Griffin 1749-1754 | Succeeded by Sir Francis Blake Delaval; Sir John Griffin |
