= James Brudenell (died 1746) =

British courtier, office holder and Whig politician

James Brudenell (c.1687–1746), of Luffenham, (Note: One or other of the neighbouring villages of North Luffenham and South Luffenham. The former Luffenham Hall was in North Luffenham.) Rutland, was a British courtier, office holder and Whig politician who sat in the House of Commons from 1713 to 1746.

== Early life ==
Brudenell was the second son of Francis Brudenell, Lord Brudenell and his wife Lady Frances Savile, daughter of Thomas Savile, 1st Earl of Sussex. Like all his family, Brudenell had been brought up a Roman Catholic. He and his brother George went to Italy in 1703. They enjoyed an unruly time there and while they were still in Rome, the Duke of Shrewsbury was asked to castigate Brudenell for neglecting his studies, and he may have been instrumental in converting the brothers to Anglicanism. Their guardian, Robert Constable, 3rd Earl of Dunbar, ordered them back to England in the autumn of 1704 but instead, they went on to Venice where Brudenell developed smallpox. The brothers finally returned to England at the end of April 1706.

== Career ==
Brudenell was elected as Whig Member of Parliament for Chichester at the 1713 general election on the interest of his brother-in-law, the Duke of Richmond. He voted against the expulsion of Richard Steele on 18 March 1714. He was defeated at Chichester at the 1715 general election, but was brought in by his friend, Lord Lymington, as MP for Andover at a by-election on 1 April 1715. He was appointed Master of the Jewel Office in 1716 at £450 per annum, and voted regularly with the Government. He was returned unopposed for Andover at the 1722 general election. The only surviving record of his thirty-three years in Parliament occurred on 14 November 1722 when for lack of a seat during a very large committee, he got into the Speaker's chair, and confidently stayed there for the whole committee which was something no one had done before.

Brudenell married in March 1725, Susan Burton, daughter of Bartholomew Burton of a wealthy merchant of Ashwell, Rutland and a sister of William and Bartholomew Burton. She was a Woman of the Bedchamber to the Queen. He was returned again for Andover at the 1727 general election, and in 1730 was promoted to the Board of Trade at £1,000 per annum, although he did not often attend. In 1731, he became Groom of the Bedchamber at £500 per annum. At the 1734 general election he stood again at Chichester as the nominee of his nephew, the 2nd Duke of Richmond and headed the poll. He was master of the horse under his nephew and he became a Gentleman of the Horse at £250 per annum, bringing his own and his wife's income from official posts to over £2,000 per annum. He was returned again for Chichester at the 1741 general election. He voted consistently with the government.

== Death and legacy ==
Brudenell died from apoplexy on 9 August 1746. He and his wife had two sons and two daughters.

== Notes ==
Parliament of Great Britain
Preceded by Sir John Miller, 2nd Bt; Sir Richard Farington, 1st Bt	Member of Parliament for Chichester; 1713–1715; With: William Elson	Succeeded by Sir Richard Farington, 1st Bt; Thomas Miller
Preceded by John Wallop; William Guidott	Member of Parliament for Andover; 1715–1734; With: William Guidott 1715-1727; Viscount Milsington 1727-1730; William Guidott 1730-1734	Succeeded by John Pollen; William Guidott
Preceded by Sir Thomas Prendergast, 2nd Baronet; James Lumley	Member of Parliament for Chichester; 1734–1746; With: Thomas Yates 1734-1741; John Page 1741-1746	Succeeded by George Keppel; John Page
