= Edmund Faber, 1st Baron Faber =

British Conservative politician

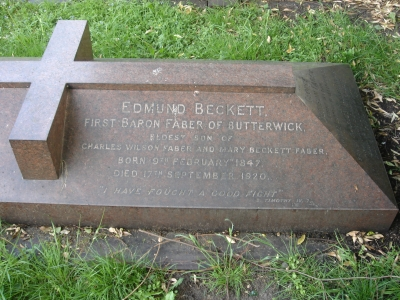
Gravestone, Brompton Cemetery, London

Edmund Beckett Faber, 1st Baron Faber (9 February 1847 – 17 September 1920) was a British Conservative politician.

== Background ==
Faber was the eldest son of Charles Wilson Faber, of Northaw, a Deputy Lieutenant of Hertfordshire and Mary Beckett, daughter of Sir Edmund Beckett, 4th Baronet, and thus sister of the 1st Baron Grimthorpe. His maternal grandfather had been a Conservative Member of Parliament for Yorkshire.

Two younger brothers were also in parliament, Denison Faber (1852-1931), who became Lord Wittenham, and Captain Walter Vavasour Faber (1857-1928), who succeeded his eldest brother as member for Andover. It has been claimed that they had a sister, Mary Eliza, who married Edward Kennard and was a sporting novelist as Mrs Edward Kennard. However this is contradicted by official birth and marriage records.

== Political career ==
Faber was educated at Eton and Trinity College, Cambridge, and was a senior partner in Beckett's Bank, Leeds and York. He was also Chairman of the English Country Bankers' Association, Chairman of the Yorkshire Post, and Chairman of the London and North Western Railway.

He also served as Justice of the Peace and Deputy Lieutenant for the West Riding of Yorkshire.

In the 1900 general election he unsuccessfully contested Pudsey, but was elected a Member of Parliament for Andover in a by-election in August 1901, after the death of Bramston Beach. On 29 December 1905 he was raised to the peerage as Baron Faber, of Butterwick in the County of Lincoln, and thus did not stand for re-election in the January 1906 general election. The constituency was won by his younger brother, Walter Vavasour Faber.

== Personal life ==
Faber died in Marylebone, London, on 17 September 1920, aged 73, and is buried in Brompton Cemetery. The grave lies to the east side of the main north approach path and is visible only through a low tunnel in the shrubbery. He is buried with his brother Denison, who died childless, leaving the barony extinct.

Parliament of the United Kingdom
Preceded by Bramston Beach	Member of Parliament for Andover; 1901 – 1905	Succeeded by Walter Faber
Peerage of the United Kingdom
New creation	Baron Faber; 1905–1920	Extinct
