= Francis Buxton =

British politician

Francis William Buxton (5 August 1847 – 14 November 1911) was a British barrister and Liberal Party politician.

Buxton was the son of Sir Edward Buxton, 2nd Baronet, and the grandson of the anti-slavery campaigner Sir Thomas Buxton, 1st Baronet. His mother was Catherine, daughter of Samuel Gurney, while Sir Thomas Buxton, 3rd Baronet, was his elder brother, Charles Buxton his uncle, Noel Noel-Buxton, 1st Baron Noel-Buxton, his nephew and Sydney Buxton, 1st Earl Buxton, his first cousin.

He was born at Colne House, Cromer, Norfolk, and educated at Trinity College, Cambridge, graduating B.A. in 1869 before training for the bar at Lincoln's Inn. Called to the Bar in 1874, he became a partner in the London banking firm of Prescott and Company. Between 1880 and 1885 he sat as Member of Parliament for Andover. He was also a Justice of the Peace for the County of London and for Hertfordshire, a Public Works Loan Commissioner in 1893 and a member of the London School Board from 1899 to 1904. He was also a member of the council of the Girls' Public Day School Company, 1886–1903, and one of its vice-presidents from 1903.

Buxton married the Hon. Mary Emma, daughter of John Lawrence, 1st Baron Lawrence, in 1872. Their sons included John Lawrence Buxton, a brigadier in the British Army and Robert Vere Buxton DSO, a cricketer, soldier and banker.

Buxton died in Marylebone, London in November 1911, aged 64. His wife was appointed an OBE in 1918. She died in February 1939.

== See also ==
- Buxton baronets
- Baron Noel-Buxton

Parliament of the United Kingdom
Preceded by Henry Wellesley	Member of Parliament for Andover; 1880 – 1885	Succeeded by Bramston Beach
