= Bluett Wallop =

British soldier and politician (1726–1749)

Bluett (or Bluet) Wallop (27 April 1726 – 6 June 1749) was a British soldier and politician.

The fourth son of John Wallop, 1st Earl of Portsmouth, Bluett was appointed a Page of Honour to George II on 8 November 1739. He served the King on campaign in Flanders in 1743 and 1744. In the latter year, he left the royal household, having obtained a commission as a cornet in Honywood's Regiment of Horse. He was with his regiment at Fontenoy, and soon thereafter got a captaincy in Lord Sempill's Regiment of Foot. He fought at Culloden, and later got the captaincy of a troop of horse and served as equerry to the Duke of Cumberland.

In 1747, he was returned to Parliament as a member for Newport, Isle of Wight, owing to his father's influence as Governor of the Isle of Wight. He died of smallpox in 1749.

Parliament of Great Britain
Preceded by Anthony Chute; Monoux Cope	Member of Parliament for Newport (Isle of Wight); 1747–1749; With: Thomas Lee Dummer	Succeeded by Thomas Lee Dummer; Ralph Jenison
Court offices
Preceded by John Ashburnham	Page of Honour; 1739–1744	Succeeded by Hon. William Howe
