= Faberstown =

Coordinates: 51.253°N 1.603°W

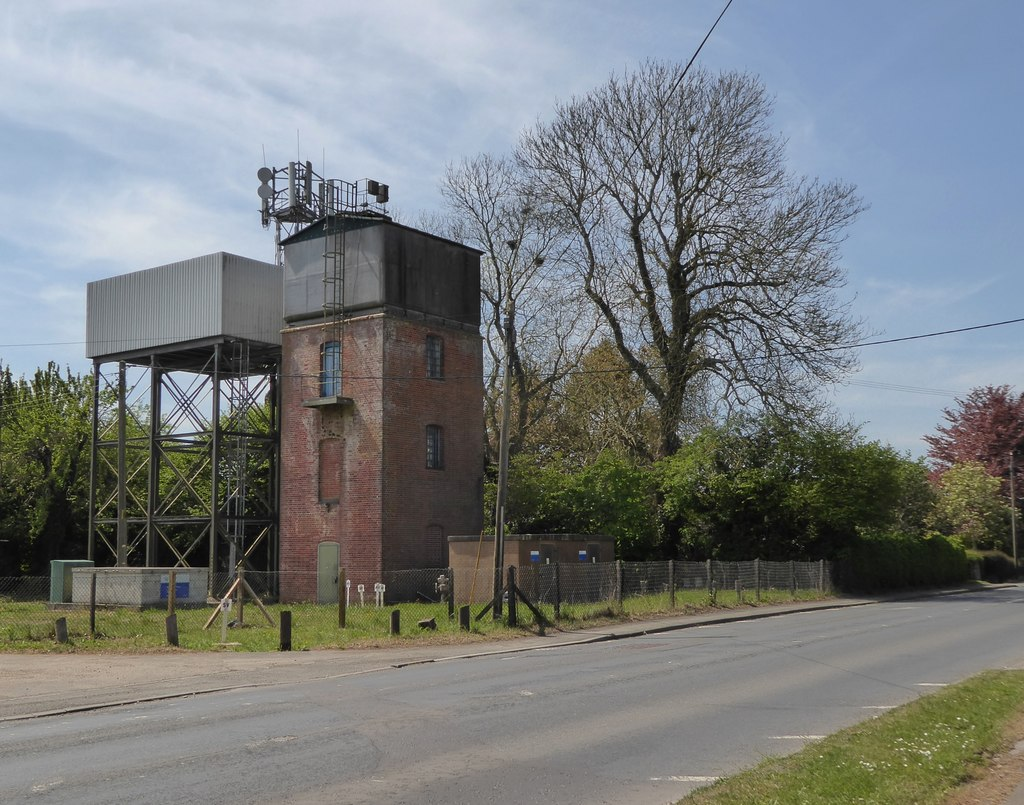
- Water towers at Faberstown

- Location within Wiltshire
- OS grid reference: SU278505
- Civil parish: Ludgershall
- Unitary authority: Wiltshire
- Ceremonial county: Wiltshire
- Region: South West
- Country: England
- Sovereign state: United Kingdom
- Post town: ANDOVER
- Postcode district: SP11
- Dialling code: 01264
- Police: Wiltshire
- Fire: Dorset and Wiltshire
- Ambulance: South Western
- UK Parliament: East Wiltshire

Faberstown is a settlement in the civil parish of Ludgershall, Wiltshire, England. Its nearest town is Andover, approximately 6 miles (9.7 km) to the southeast.

At the beginning of the 20th century a local Member of Parliament, Walter Faber, began building houses to the east of the village of Ludgershall, on land in Hampshire. This settlement became known as Faberstown. By 1970 Ludgershall and Faberstown were in essence a single village, and in 1992 a boundary change brought Faberstown into Wiltshire from Hampshire.
