= John Parry (1724–1797) =

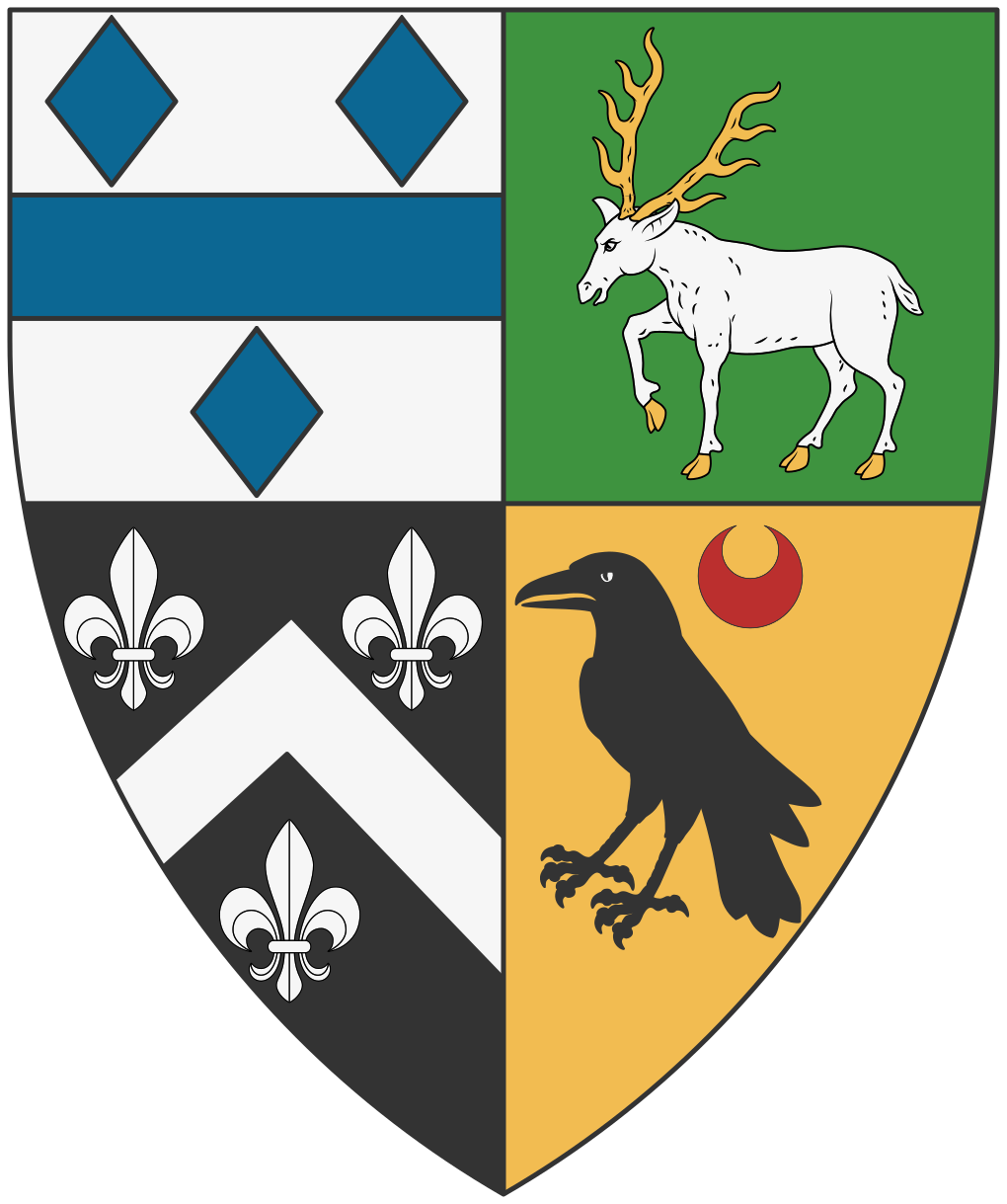
John Parry's arms as they appeared on his portrait.Jones quartering Hughes, Penarth-fawr, and Corbet

John Parry (22 September 1724 – 26 October 1797), was a Welsh lawyer and politician who sat in the House of Commons from 1780 to 1790.

Parry was the second son of Love Parry of Wernfawr and his wife Rachel Corbet, daughter of Vincent Corbet of Ynysymaengwyn, Merionethshire. He was educated at Wrexham under Mr Jones and was admitted at Lincoln's Inn on 29 March 1742 and at St John's College, Cambridge on 5 April 1742. In 1748, he was called to the bar. He married Elizabeth Warrington, daughter of George Warrington of Wrexham. In June 1769 he was appointed attorney-general for the North Wales circuit, and in December 1769 as Constable of Conway Castle. He became a bencher of Lincoln's Inn in 1772 and Treasurer in 1785.

Parry was returned unopposed as Member of Parliament for Carnarvonshire at the 1780 general election and was returned unopposed again in 1784. In the last parliament he was twice passed over for a Welsh judgeship and he did not stand in 1790.

Parry ceased to be attorney-general for the North Wales circuit in April 1797, six months before his death on 26 October 1797. He and his wife Elizabeth had no children.

Parliament of Great Britain
Preceded by Thomas Assheton Smith	Member of Parliament for Caernarvonshire; 1780–1790	Succeeded by Robert Williams
