= Walter Faber =

British politician and military officer

Walter Vavasour Faber (11 February 1857 – 2 April 1928) was a Conservative politician and soldier.

== Background ==
Faber was the youngest son of Charles Wilson Faber, of Northaw, a Deputy Lieutenant of Hertfordshire and Mary Beckett, daughter of Sir Edmund Beckett, 4th Baronet, and thus sister of the 1st Baron Grimthorpe. His maternal grandfather had been a Conservative Member of Parliament for Yorkshire.

His two elder brothers were both members of parliament who were ennobled, Edmund Faber (1847–1920), who later became Lord Faber, and Denison Faber (1852–1931), who later became Lord Wittenham. There are claims that Mary Eliza (1850–1936), who became a novelist, was their sister but birth and marriage records contradict these claims.

Faber was educated at Malvern College before attending the Royal Military Academy, Woolwich. He served in the Royal Artillery, rising to the rank of captain, before he retired. He was subsequently appointed a lieutenant in the Royal Wiltshire Yeomanry, and promoted to captain (supernumerary) in the regiment on 6 June 1902. He was appointed a deputy lieutenant of Hampshire on 3 December 1920.

== Political career ==
His elder brother Denison was the MP for Andover until he was raised to the peerage as Baron Faber in December 1905, when his seat was vacated. Walter stood and won the January 1906 general election, and served as Member of Parliament (MP) for Andover until 1918.

== Legacy ==
The Wiltshire village of Faberstown is named after him.

Parliament of the United Kingdom
Preceded by Edmund Faber	Member of Parliament for Andover; 1906–1918	Succeeded by Constituency abolished
