= HMS Royal Charlotte (1824) =

History

United Kingdom
- Name: HMS Royal Charlotte
- Launched: 22 November 1824
- Fate: Broken up in 1832

General characteristics
- Tons burthen: 202 (bm)
- Propulsion: Sails

HMS Royal Charlotte was a 6-gun yacht launched in 1824 and broken up in 1832.

Lord William Paget son of the marquess Anglesey was appointed captain of the vice-regal yacht, in November 1827 on a salary of £1,200, by the duke of Clarence for the duration of Paget's fathers, Irish lord lieutenancy.

Royal Charlotte was broken up in October 1832. From her materials, a vessel of 40-50 tons was constructed at Pembroke Dockyard. Named Fountain, she was launched in December 1833. She was a tank vessel used for supplying water to ships on the River Medway.
