= 1820 English cricket season =

Cricket season review

The 1820 English cricket season was the 34th since the foundation of Marylebone Cricket Club (MCC). Fuller Pilch made his first known appearance at Lord's. Details of five historically important eleven-a-side matches are known. (Note: Any match listed in the ACS' Important Match Guide (1981) is historically important, and therefore of the highest standard, whether or not a scorecard might exist. The same applies to numerous matches discovered by researchers since 1981. For further information, see First-class cricket.)

== Events ==
- According to Wisden Cricketers' Almanack, the original Northamptonshire County Cricket Club was founded in 1820, but was subject to substantial reorganisation and reformation in 1878. 1820 also has the earliest mention of wicket-keeping gloves.
- William Ward scored 278 for Marylebone Cricket Club (MCC) v Norfolk at Lord's in 1820, the first known double-century, and a new world record for the highest individual innings in all forms of cricket, beating James Aylward's score of 167 in 1777. Opinion about the match's status is divided, so Aylward can be said to have held the record for important matches until 1826.
- With cricket still recovering from the effects of the Napoleonic War, only a few important matches were recorded in 1820:
  - 23/25 May — Cambridge Town Club v Cambridge University @ Parker's Piece, Cambridge.
  - 30 May — Cambridge Town Club v Cambridge University @ Parker's Piece, Cambridge.
  - 19–20 June — Gentlemen v Players @ Lord's.
  - 3–5 July — England v Hampshire @ Lord's.
  - In addition, on 24 July, the MCC v Norfolk match at Lord's, which has dubious provenance.

== Bibliography ==
- ACS (1981). A Guide to Important Cricket Matches Played in the British Isles 1709–1863. Nottingham: ACS. OCLC 85045528.
- Haygarth, Arthur (1996) [1862]. Scores & Biographies, Volume 1 (1744–1826). Kennington: Frederick Lillywhite. ISBN 978-19-00592-23-9.
- Rae, Simon (1998). W. G. Grace: A Life. London: Faber & Faber. ISBN 978-05-71178-55-1.
