= Coombe, Hampshire =

Village in Hampshire, England

Coordinates: 50.98011°N 1.05837°W

Coombe is a hamlet in Hampshire, England. It is located in East Hampshire, in the civil parish of East Meon.

== Location ==
Coombe is located at grid reference SU662205
