= Sir John Trott, 1st Baronet =

English politician

Sir John Trott, 1st Baronet (c. 1615 – 14 July 1672) of Laverstoke, Hampshire was an English politician who sat in the House of Commons from 1660 to 1672.

He was the only son of John Trott, a haberdasher of London and Laverstoke and educated at Clare College, Cambridge.

In 1660 Trott was elected Member of Parliament for Andover in the Convention Parliament. He was created a baronet, of Leverstoke in the County of Southampton, on 12 October 1660. In 1661 he was re-elected MP for Andover in the Cavalier Parliament and sat until his death.

He died in 1672 and was buried in Laverstoke. He had married Elizabeth Wright, daughter of Sir Edmund Wright, Lord Mayor of London in 1640. There was no male heir and the baronetcy thus became extinct. Their daughter Catherine, who had married Sir Hugh Stukeley, 2nd Baronet of Hinton, inherited his Laverstoke estate.

Baronetage of England
New creation	Baronet (of Leverstoke); 1660–1672	Extinct
