= Bramston Beach (politician) =

English Conservative politician

The Right Honourable Bramston Beach MP PC
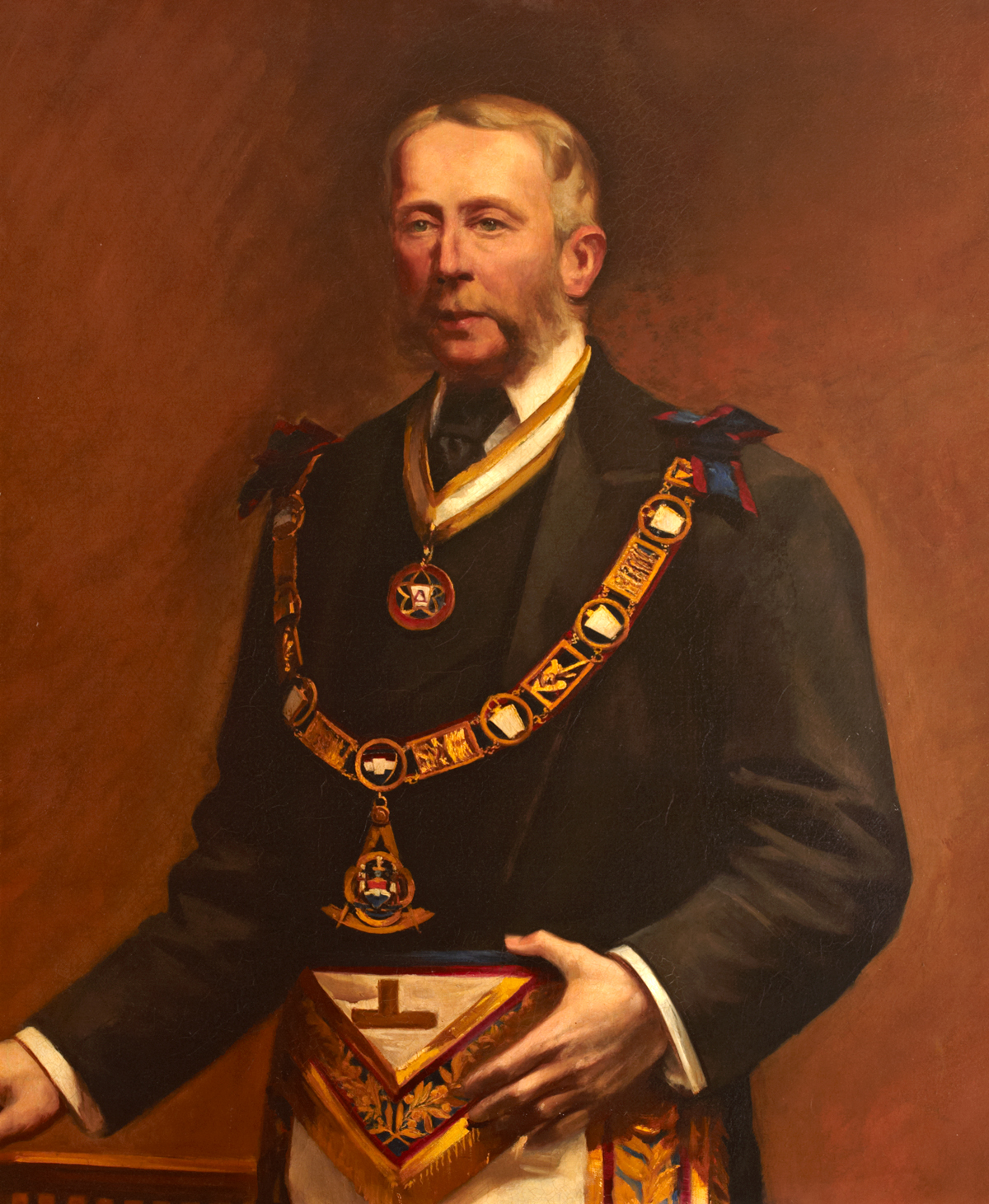
- Portrait attributed to Jean Marius Rogier

Father of the House of Commons
- In office 23 April 1899 – 3 August 1901
- Preceded by: John Mowbray
- Succeeded by: Michael Hicks Beach

Member of Parliament for Andover
- In office 24 November 1885 – 3 August 1901
- Preceded by: Francis Buxton
- Succeeded by: Edmund Faber

Member of Parliament for North Hampshire
- In office 27 March 1857 – 24 November 1885
- Preceded by: Charles Shaw-Lefevre
- Succeeded by: Constituency abolished

Personal details
- Born: 25 December 1826 Oakley Hall, Hampshire, England
- Died: 3 August 1901 (aged 74) London, England
- Party: Conservative
- Education: Eton College, Christ Church, Oxford

William Wither Bramston Beach PC (25 December 1826 – 3 August 1901) was an English Conservative politician, who served in the House of Commons for 44 years between 1857 and 1901, becoming Father of the House of Commons in 1899.

== Birth and education ==
Beach was the son of former MP for Malmesbury, William Beach (1783-1856) of Oakley Hall, Hampshire and his wife Jane Henrietta Browne (1804-1831), daughter of John Browne of Salperton Park, Gloucestershire. His paternal grandfather was Michael Hicks Beach, ancestor of the Hicks Beach baronets. His paternal cousin was Michael Hicks Beach, Chancellor of the Exchequer. Beach was educated at Eton and Christ Church, Oxford where he excelled as an athlete. He participated in steeple-chases, but was badly injured after falling from a horse in 1852.

== Political career ==
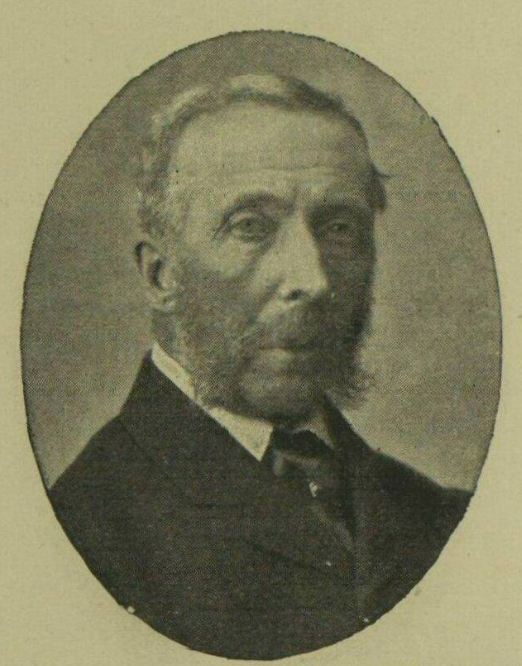
Beach pictured c.1890

Beach's political career began in January 1856, when at a meeting chaired in Basingstoke by William Lyde Wiggett Chute, it was decided that he was the desired candidate to stand in the 1857 general election, succeeding the retiring Charles Shaw-Lefevre. He was elected Member of Parliament for North Hampshire the following year, alongside George Sclater-Booth. Beach would be re-elected five times for the constituency between 1859 & 1880, before the seat was re-organised under the Redistribution of Seats Act 1885. He was consequently elected MP for Andover and held the seat until his death.

In the House of Commons, he spoke little (not making his maiden speech until 1860, almost three years after being elected), but did much hard work in committee and was appointed a Privy Councillor in January 1900. Beach served on the management committee for the Royal Free Hospital, London, from 1858, and the Winchester Diocesan Training School in 1862. He was against the Parliamentary Oaths Act 1866, and was a supporter of the campaign to repeal malt duty, serving as a member of the Central Malt Duty Repeal Association in the 1860s.

Beach was actively involved in the rapidly growing British railway industry, and became a Director of the London and South Western Railway, becoming Deputy Chairman of the railway's Board under the Chairmanship of Sir William Wyndam Portal, 2nd Baronet. When a Masonic Lodge was formed for the staff of the London and South Western Railway it was named Beach Lodge after the Deputy Chairman, who also served as the Lodge's first Worshipful Master.

== Private life ==
Beach married Caroline Chichester Clevland, daughter of Colonel Augustus Clevland of Tapeley Park, North Devon in Westleigh, on 8 October 1857. They lived at Oakley Hall, which Beach had inherited following his father's death the previous year. The couple had three children: Archibald, Margaret, and Ellice.

He was a J. P. for Hampshire and was also commissioned in the Hampshire Yeomanry Cavalry in 1858. He was made Hon. Major in 1881, and retired the following year. Beach was a member of the Northants Agricultural Society, and served on the building committee for the Basingstoke Corn Exchange, built 1864–65.

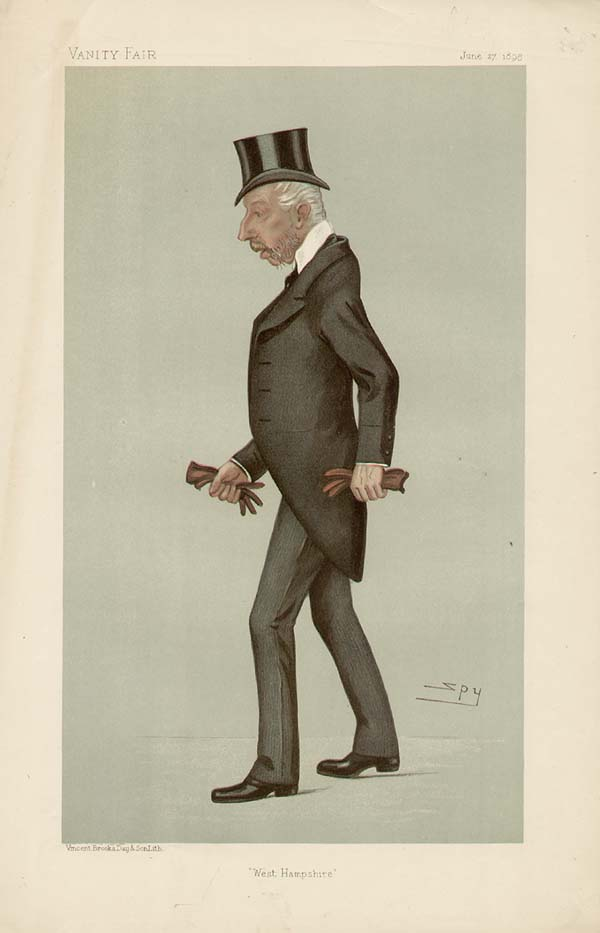
"West Hampshire" Beach as caricatured by Spy (Leslie Ward) in Vanity Fair, June 1895

Beach was a very active Freemason, having been initiated in the Apollo University Lodge, Oxford, whilst at university. He subsequently became a member of multiple Masonic lodges and Holy Royal Arch Chapters, becoming Provincial Grand Master for Hampshire and Isle of Wight in 1869, and later Third Grand Principal (the third most senior member) of the Supreme Grand Chapter of Royal Arch Freemasons of England.

== Death ==
On the evening of 2 August 1901 Beach was severely injured when the horse of the Hansom cab in which he was riding stumbled onto an unguarded roadworks trench while attempting to avoid a bus on Parliament Street. Beach and the driver of the cab were thrown onto the road, and Beach was taken, unconscious, to Westminster Hospital. He woke around three hours later, and was noted to have suffered several head injuries, including a concussion and several abrasions. After appearing to slowly recover, he succumbed to his injuries the following night, aged 74. An inquiry was opened into his death the following week, and a verdict of accidental death was returned.

Beach's funeral was held on 9 August at the All Saints Church, Deane, Hampshire. His wife, Caroline, died in 1918, aged 82.

Parliament of the United Kingdom
Preceded by Charles Shaw-Lefevre; Melville Portal	Member of Parliament for North Hampshire; 1857 – 1885; With: George Sclater-Booth	Constituency divided
Preceded by Francis Buxton	Member of Parliament for Andover; 1885 – 1901	Succeeded by Edmund Faber
Preceded by Sir John Mowbray, 1st Baronet	Father of the House; 1899–1901	Succeeded by Sir Michael Hicks Beach
