= John Wallop, 1st Earl of Portsmouth =

British politician (1690–1762)

John Wallop, 1st Earl of Portsmouth (15 April 1690 – 22 November 1762), of Hurstbourne Park, near Whitchurch and Farleigh Wallop, Hampshire, known as John Wallop, 1st Viscount Lymington from 1720 to 1743, was a British politician who sat in the House of Commons from 1715 to 1720, when he vacated his seat on being raised to the peerage as Viscount Lymington and Baron Wallop.

== Early life ==
Wallop was the third son of John Wallop, of Farleigh Wallop and his wife Alicia, daughter of William Borlase. The Wallops were an old and influential Hampshire family; his great-grandfather was the regicide Robert Wallop. His father died about 1694, and he succeeded an elder brother, Bluett Wallop, in the family estates in 1707. Wallop was educated at Eton in 1708, in Geneva from 1708 to 1709, and took his Grand Tour through Italy and Germany in 1710.

== Political career ==
In 1715, Wallop was returned as a Whig Member of Parliament for both Andover, where a family interest existed, and Hampshire, choosing to sit for the latter. In 1717, he took the side of Stanhope and Sunderland over Walpole and Townshend and was rewarded with appointment as a junior Lord of the Treasury. He was re-elected without opposition at the ensuing by-election in Hampshire. However, he voted against the Government on the repeal of the Occasional Conformity and Schism Acts.

When Sunderland fell in 1720 after the South Sea Bubble, Wallop was put out of the Treasury. He was compensated with a peerage, being created Viscount Lymington and Baron Wallop on 11 June 1720. In 1731, he suggested to Queen Caroline (through the medium of her favorite, Charlotte Clayton) that he should replace the Duke of Bolton as the Government's electoral manager in Hampshire, but nothing immediately came of this.

On 11 January 1732 (O.S.) he was appointed Justice in Eyre for the forests north of Trent. In 1733, when the Duke of Bolton broke with Walpole over the proposed Excise Bill, he was stripped of most of his offices; Lymington succeeded him as Lord Lieutenant of Hampshire, Vice-Admiral of Hampshire, and Vice-Admiral of the Isle of Wight. In July 1734, the Duke of Montagu, who had succeeded Bolton as Governor of the Isle of Wight, resigned that office and Lymington received it as well, although he resigned office as Justice in Eyre that year. The disaffection of Bolton threatened the Whig interest in Hampshire. Lymington worked in "perfect harmony" with Lord Harry Powlett, Bolton's brother and one of the Whig candidates, but Bolton's opposition to Anthony Chute, the other Whig, resulted in the defeat of Chute and the victory of one of the Tory candidates, Edward Lisle.

Upon Walpole's fall in 1742 (due in part to the failed siege of Cartagena, which had claimed the life of Lymington's second son), the Duke of Bolton regained all of his prior offices in Hampshire and the Isle of Wight, to Lymington's loss. As in 1720, Lymington was compensated with a peerage, and was created Earl of Portsmouth on 11 October 1743. He regained the offices of Governor and Vice-Admiral of the Isle of Wight in 1746, when Bolton supported the abortive ministry of Bath and Granville and was deprived of those posts by the Pelhams.

== Family ==
On 20 May 1716, Wallop had married Lady Bridget Bennet (d. 12 October 1738), the daughter of Charles Bennet, 1st Earl of Tankerville. They had six sons and four daughters:

- Hon. Bridget Wallop (20 February 1717 – 26 June 1736)
- John Wallop, Viscount Lymington (1718–1749)
- Hon. Borlace Wallop (3 June 1720 – April 1741)(elsewhere Burlace), educated as a gentleman commoner at Winchester College (around 1731), ensign in the Royal Regiment of Foot Guards, aide-de-camp to General Wentworth, carried orders at the attack on Fort Saint Lazarus and died of fever soon thereafter
- Hon. Mary Wallop (17 August 1721 – 13 April 1722)
- Hon. Charles Wallop (1722–1771)
- Hon. Anne Wallop (d. 3 March 1759), unmarried
- Hon. Bluett Wallop (1726–1749)
- Hon. Elizabeth Wallop (d. June 1727)
- Henry Wallop, died in infancy
- Bennet Wallop, died young

Lymington remarried on 9 June 1741 to Elizabeth, widow of Henry Grey and daughter of James Griffin, 2nd Baron Griffin of Braybrooke; they had no children.

Two of his sons died in 1749: Bluett, his youngest, in June, and John, Viscount Lymington in November. Upon his death in 1762, Wallop was succeeded by his grandson John Wallop, 2nd Earl of Portsmouth.

Parliament of Great Britain
Preceded by William Guidott; Gilbert Searle	Member of Parliament for Andover; 1715; With: William Guidott	Succeeded by William Guidott; James Brudenell
Preceded by Thomas Lewis; Sir Anthony Sturt	Member of Parliament for Hampshire; 1715–1720; With: George Pitt	Succeeded by George Pitt; Lord Nassau Powlett
Legal offices
Preceded by The Earl of Harborough	Justice in Eyre north of the Trent; 1733–1734	Succeeded by The Duke of Ancaster and Kesteven
Honorary titles
Preceded by The 3rd Duke of Bolton	Lord Lieutenant of Hampshire; 1733–1742	Succeeded by The 3rd Duke of Bolton
Preceded by The 3rd Duke of Bolton	Vice-Admiral of Hampshire and the Isle of Wight; 1733–1742	Succeeded by The 3rd Duke of Bolton
Preceded by The Duke of Montagu	Governor of the Isle of Wight; 1734–1742	Succeeded by The 3rd Duke of Bolton
Preceded by The 3rd Duke of Bolton	Governor and Vice-Admiral of the Isle of Wight; 1746–1762	Succeeded by The Lord Holmes
Peerage of Great Britain
New creation	Earl of Portsmouth; 1743–1762	Succeeded by John Wallop
New creation	Viscount Lymington; 1720–1762	Succeeded by John Wallop
