= Thomas Assheton Smith (1752–1828) =

English landowner

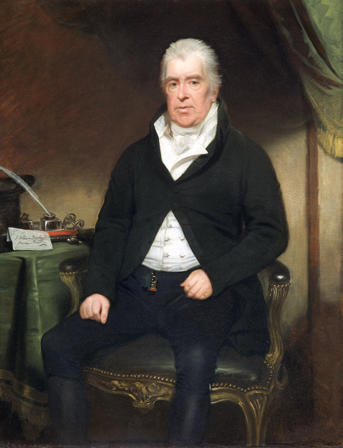

Member of Parliament for Caernarvonshire
- In office 1774–1780
- Preceded by: Thomas Wynn
- Succeeded by: John Parry

Personal details
- Born: 1752
- Died: 12 May 1828 (aged 75–76)

Thomas Assheton Smith (the elder) (1752 – 12 May 1828) was an English landowner and all-round sportsman who played a major part in the development of the Welsh slate industry.

== Life ==
Smith was the eldest son of Thomas Assheton of Ashley, Mobberley in Cheshire, who had added "Smith" to his surname when he inherited the Vaynol (Caernarvonshire) and Tidworth (then in Hampshire) estates from his uncle, William Smith.

He was High Sheriff of Caernarfonshire for 1774–75 and 1783–84 and High Sheriff of Anglesey for 1784–85. He was Member of Parliament for Caernarvonshire from 1774 to 1780 and also MP for the English borough of Andover, Hampshire between 1797 and 1821. He served as Lord Lieutenant of Caernarvonshire from 1822 until his death.

In 1806 he induced Parliament to pass an act enclosing the common land of Llanddeiniolen parish, adding over 2,600 acres to his land holdings, and giving him the right as lord of the manor to the slate on the commons. He put down the rioting which resisted exercise of his new rights of control over the commons with the support of a cavalry unit. In 1809, he took over control of slate quarrying on his estate, forming a company of four under his presidency. The company was later dissolved and he took over sole control of the enterprise. By 1826 the Dinorwic Quarry was employing 800 men and producing 20,000 tons of slate per year. Assheton Smith developed Port Dinorwic (Y Felinheli) as a port for the export of the slates.

== Cricket ==
Thomas Assheton Smith was a keen sportsman and was particularly noted for his involvement in cricket. He was a close friend of George Finch, 9th Earl of Winchilsea and became one of cricket's main patrons following the establishment of Marylebone Cricket Club (MCC) in 1787. Smith was not a good player, unlike his son, but is known to have taken part in 45 major matches between the 1787 and 1796 seasons. In the contemporary scorecards, he is generally shown as "A Smith, Esq." whereas his son was usually recorded as "T A Smith, Esq.".

== Family and death ==
Assheton Smith married Elizabeth Wynn, daughter of Watkin Wynn of Foelas. His eldest son, John, was expelled from the family after marrying a servant, and was subsequently wiped from their family records. Assheton Smith's third son, William, saw action at Trafalgar on HMS Temeraire but drowned in 1806. There were also five daughters.

He died at Tidworth in 1828, and the Tidworth and Vaynol estates were inherited by his namesake second son, Thomas Assheton Smith (1776–1858), who was also a noted amateur cricketer and all-round sportsman.

Parliament of Great Britain
Preceded by Thomas Wynn	Member of Parliament for Caernarvonshire; 1774–1780	Succeeded by John Parry
Preceded by Benjamin Lethieullier; Hon Coulson Wallop	Member of Parliament for Andover; 1797–1800; With: Hon Coulson Wallop	Succeeded by Parliament of the United Kingdom
Parliament of the United Kingdom
Preceded by Parliament of Great Britain	Member of Parliament for Andover; 1800-1821; With: Hon Coulson Wallop 1800-1802; Hon Newton Fellowes 1802-1820; Sir John Pollen, 2nd Baronet 1820-1821	Succeeded by Thomas Assheton Smith II; Sir John Pollen, 2nd Baronet
Honorary titles
Preceded by The Viscount Bulkeley	Lord Lieutenant of Caernarvonshire; 1822–1828	Succeeded by The Lord Gwydyr
