= Ralph Etwall =

English politician

Ralph Etwall (30 May 1804 – 15 December 1882) was an English Whig and Liberal politician who sat in the House of Commons from 1831 to 1847.

Etwall was the son of Ralph Etwall who owned several hundred acres, and he was described as "the most ungainly person, and for a gentleman the most uncouth".

At the 1831 general election Etwall was elected Member of Parliament for Andover. He held the seat until 1847. Etwall was active in parliament in pursuing the scandalous treatment of children at the Andover workhouse.

Etwall was fond of field sports and also kept race-horses for about 15 years. However, with the expense of his elections and the cost of his sports he ended up heavily in debt and left England to live many years in seclusion in France. He died at the age of 78.
