= Jenyns =

Jenyns is a surname. Notable persons with that name include:

- Bob Jenyns (born 1944), Australian artist
- Essie Jenyns (1864–1920), Australian stage actress
- John Jenyns (c. 1660–1717), English politician
- Leonard Jenyns, (1800–1893), English clergyman, author and naturalist
- Roger Jenyns (1663–1740), English knight and landowner
- Soame Jenyns (1704–1787), English writer
- Stephen Jenyns (c. 1450 – 1523), English politician

== See also ==
- Jennings (disambiguation)
