= Cadogan Estates =

British property company

Cadogan Estates logo

Cadogan Group Limited and its subsidiaries, including Cadogan Estates Limited, are British property investment and management companies that are owned by the Cadogan family, one of the richest families in the United Kingdom. They also hold the titles of Earl Cadogan and Viscount Chelsea, the latter used as a courtesy title by the Earl's eldest son. The Cadogan Group is the main landlord in the west London districts of Chelsea and Knightsbridge, and it is now the second largest of the surviving aristocratic Freehold Estates in Central London, after the Duke of Westminster's Grosvenor Estate, to which it is adjacent, covering Mayfair and Belgravia.

== Property ==
The Cadogan Estate covers 93 acres (over 376,000 square metres) of the Royal Borough of Kensington and Chelsea, including residential properties, offices and retail space. The Foundations of the Estate were established in 1717 when Charles Cadogan, 2nd Baron Cadogan, married Elizabeth Sloane, daughter of Sir Hans Sloane, having purchased the Manor of Chelsea in 1712. This part of London has remained under the ownership of the Cadogan family ever since, the tradition continuing today under the present Chairman, Edward Cadogan, 9th Earl Cadogan.

Today the Estate includes approximately 3,000 flats, 200 houses, 300 shops, 500,000 square feet (over 46,000 square meters) of office space and over a dozen gardens covering 15 acres (some 60,000 square meters).

The Estate's long history, family ownership and conservative financial structure permit a long-term approach, the area developing into one of London's most notable neighbourhoods.

== History ==
The company owes its origins to Sir Hans Sloane, a well-known explorer, physician and collector, having purchased the manor of Chelsea in 1712 and the 10-acre (40,000 m2) site of Beaufort House at Cheyne Walk in 1737. Sloane later died in 1753 without any male heirs, leaving his estate to two daughters.

In 1777, Charles Cadogan, 1st Earl Cadogan – granted a lease to architect Henry Holland to create the first-ever purpose-built new town. "Hans Town" provided attractive Georgian terraced houses to people of moderately affluent means. Jane Austen and her brother lived in one; William Wilberforce, who led the movement to abolish slavery, in another.

As London swelled during the industrial age, George Cadogan, 5th Earl Cadogan (1840-1915), undertook a review of his estate and decided on a comprehensive redevelopment. He commissioned cutting-edge architecture and a new red-brick style that became synonymous with the area: Pont Street Dutch. The opening of Sloane Square Station happened in 1868 and the completion of the riverside embankment in 1874. During the period 1877 to 1900 much of the modern Estate took shape. Cadogan Square – the "jewel in the crown" of the new development – the Royal Court Theatre at Sloane Square and Holy Trinity Church on Sloane Street were built under the 5th Earl's auspices and received support from Cadogan to the present day.

The 5th Earl was a Chelsea councillor and its first Mayor. His grandson, William Cadogan, 7th Earl Cadogan was Chelsea's last (before being incorporated with the Royal Borough of Kensington). He died in 1997 aged 83, the title passing to Charles Cadogan, 8th Earl Cadogan. The 8th Earl died in 2023 and was followed by his son Edward Cadogan, 9th Earl Cadogan, who is the current chairman.[4]

Chelsea has a bohemian history and has long been a haven for artists, authors, musicians and designers from Dante Gabriel Rossetti to The Rolling Stones and Vivienne Westwood. Jane Austen stayed in Sloane Street with her brother Henry whilst writing Pride and Prejudice, and poet and writer Oscar Wilde called the borough his home.[5]

== Sloane Street ==
The estate includes a retail district centered on Sloane Street, as well as residential properties in central London. Originally developed in the 18th century by Charles Cadogan, 1st Earl Cadogan, Sloane Street has developed into a location for a number of international luxury retail brands, such as Chloe, Salvatore Ferragamo, Armani, Tom Ford and Valentino. The street runs between Knightsbridge and Sloane Square and forms part of one of London’s upmarket retail areas.

In July 2016, Cadogan launched George House, a £205 million office and retail development on Sloane Street that includes luxury flagship stores – Red Valentino, Boutique One, and Delpozo and smaller independent shops that can be accessed via Pavilion Road. George House also connects directly with new public realm, an open-air courtyard that also features a Granger & Co restaurant and gym from KX Urban.

== Pavilion Road ==
Following a consultation with the local community in summer 2015, Cadogan pledged to create a destination for independent, artisan traders behind the new George House development on Sloane Street. Established fashion and beauty boutiques have now been joined by exciting new artisan food shops in November 2016: a traditional family butcher, Provenance; fine wine shop – Pavilion Wine; bakery and school – Bread Ahead; Natoora – a fruit and vegetable specialist, offering a range of fresh seasonal produce, Ottolenghi - a fancy breakfast chain, and London Cheesemongers, who specialise in sourcing traditionally produced cheeses.

== King's Road ==
The King's Road has roots dating back to the 17th century, when access along the route was only granted to those carrying a special token bearing the king's initials. The route was made public in 1830, at a time when the area was becoming settled by artists, creatives and bohemians who hugely influenced its legacy.

It is still one of Chelsea's most popular destinations.

In October 2015, The Royal Borough of Kensington and Chelsea unanimously granted planning approval for Cadogan to redevelop 196-222 King's Road. Plans include a new 400-seat boutique cinema auditorium, a new pub for the local community, as well as retail, residential and office space that will respect the heritage and enhance the special character of its surroundings. Completion of the scheme is expected to be 2020.

== Sloane Square ==
Sloane Square is located in Chelsea and includes landmarks such as the Royal Court Theatre and the Peter Jones department store. Cultural venues in the square include the Royal Court Theatre and Cadogan Hall, which serves as a performance venue for the Royal Philharmonic Orchestra.

== Duke of York Square ==
Opened by Cadogan in 2004, Duke of York Square was described as the first new public square in London in approximately a century. The development includes around 30 shops, six restaurants, residential flats, schools, offices, and a weekly market.

The redevelopment of former Ministry of Defence land and buildings also included the relocation of the Saatchi Gallery, which displays a private collection of contemporary art and hosts public exhibitions. Duke of York Square is located at the junction of King’s Road and Sloane Square in Chelsea.

The café, designed by NEX Architects, opened in 2018 as the Duke of York Restaurant. The building features retractable curved glass walls that descend into the basement during warm weather and a public roof terrace overlooking Duke of York Square.

== Cadogan Hall ==
Cadogan Hall, just north of Sloane Square, is another example of a successful acquisition and repurposing on the Estate. Cadogan bought it in 2000 as a dilapidated church and converted it into a concert hall that seats 900 – creating a new subsidised home for the Royal Philharmonic Orchestra. The refurbishment retains many of the original features including stained glass windows by Arild Rosenkrantz (who trained at Tiffany & Co. in New York).

== Asbestos exposure ==
On 14 June 2018, Westminster Magistrates' Court fined Cadogan Estates a total of £180,000 for the 'uncontrolled release' of asbestos during renovation works to one of the Estate's properties. The asbestos contamination occurred at Rosetti Studios, Flood Street, Chelsea, in June 2015. Cadogan Estates admitted that there were failures in procedures to ensure the adequate control of asbestos during the renovation process.

== See also ==
Other large privately owned historic estates in London include:

- Bedford Estate (Bloomsbury)
- Portman Estate (Marylebone)
- Grosvenor Group (Mayfair and Belgravia)
- Howard de Walden Estate (Marylebone)
- Smith's Charity Estate (South Kensington, SW7)
- Pettiward Estate (West Brompton, SW10 & Putney)
