= Baron Montfort =

Barony in the Peerage of Great Britain

Baron Montfort is a title that has been created twice in British history. The first creation came in the Peerage of England when John de Montfort was summoned to parliament on 23 June 1295. In 1367 the title either became extinct or fell into abeyance on the death of the third Baron. The second creation came in the Peerage of Great Britain in 1741 when Henry Bromley was made Lord Montfort, Baron of Horseheath, in the County of Cambridge. He had previously represented Cambridgeshire in Parliament, as had his father John Bromley and grandfather John Bromley. Lord Montfort was succeeded by his only son, the second Baronet. He sat as Member of Parliament for the city of Cambridge. The title became extinct on the death of his son, the third Baron, in 1851.

The second family descended from the 16th century Lord Chancellor Sir Thomas Bromley and Lord Chief Justice of the same name and were still in the 18th century equally recorded with the alternative spelling and pronunciation Montford. This is a corruption as 'Montfort' means a fortified mountain or mound as in Montfort l'Amaury, the place of birth of Simon I of Montfort their 11th century French patriarch. Simon de Montfort, 6th Earl of Leicester led to the first Parliament called to act as a check on the monarch in 1295 and was commonly known as Simon de Montford hence the unusually long continuation in the alternative spelling, see Montfort for examples.

== Barons Montfort (1295) ==
- John de Montfort, 1st Baron Montfort (died 1296)
- John de Montfort, 2nd Baron Montfort (1291–1314)
- Peter de Montfort, 3rd Baron Montfort (died 1367)

== Barons Montfort (1741) ==
- Henry Bromley, 1st Baron Montfort (1705–1755)
- Thomas Bromley, 2nd Baron Montfort (1733–1799)
- Henry Bromley, 3rd Baron Montfort (1773–1851)
