= Rushout Cullen =

English landowner and Whig politician

Sir Rushout Cullen, 3rd Baronet (1661–1730), of Upton, Ratley, Warwickshire and Isleham, Cambridgeshire, was an English landowner and Whig politician who sat in the English and British House of Commons between 1697 and 1710.

== Early life ==
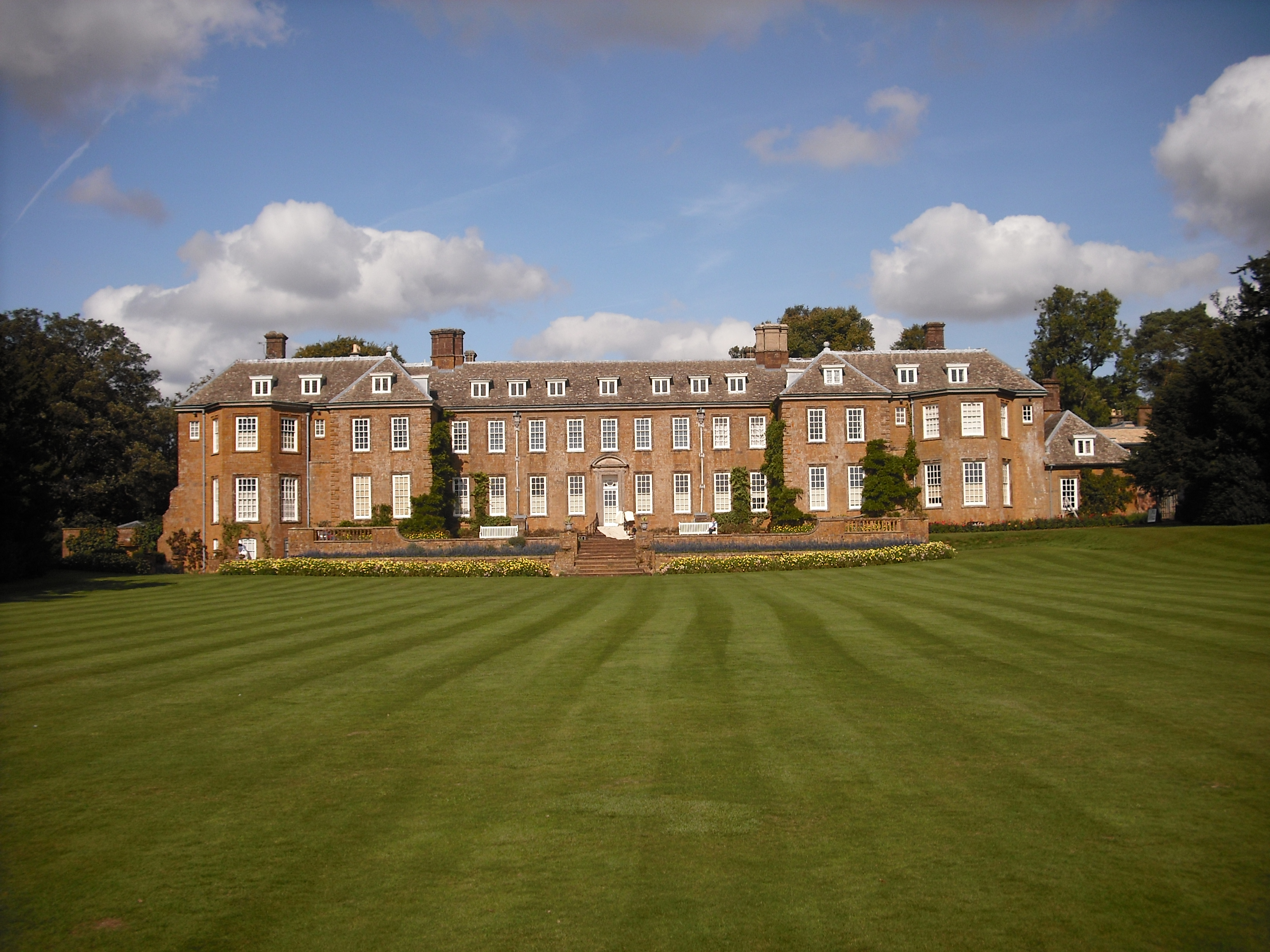
Upton House, commissioned by the 3rd Baronet

Cullen was the son of Sir Abraham Cullen, 1st Baronet, MP of East Sheen, Surrey and Upton near Banbury in Warwickshire, and his wife Abigail Rushout, daughter of John Rushout, merchant of St Dionis Backchurch, London and Maylords, Havering, Essex. In 1677, he succeeded his brother John to the baronetcy. He married his cousin Mary Adams widow of William Adams of Sprowston, Norfolk and daughter of Sir John Maynard of Tooting Graveney, Surrey on 13 April 1686. In 1688, he sold the estate at East Sheen, and bought more property at Upton, for £7,000. His wife who died in about 1694, had inherited property in Cambridgeshire where he was appointed a deputy-lieutenant. At Upton, he built the mansion known as Upton House in about 1695 and he then married, as his second wife, Eleanor Jarrett, daughter of William Jarrett, merchant, of St Dionis Backchurch, on 19 July 1696.

== Career ==
Cullen stood for Parliament as a Whig at Cambridgeshire at a by-election on 21 December 1693, and lost by seven votes to The Lord Cutts. At the 1695 English general election he stood on the suggestion of his brother-in-law, Sir James Rushout, 1st Baronet at Evesham, but, being an outsider, was narrowly defeated. He was finally returned as a Member of Parliament (MP) for Cambridgeshire at a by-election on 16 December 1697. At the 1698 English general election, he was returned in a contest, and was returned unopposed at the two general elections of 1701. In February 1702 he acted as a teller for the first time. He was a Whig and, by an electoral pact, was returned unopposed, with the Tory Granado Pigot, at the 1702 English general election. At the 1705 English general election he topped the poll in a close contest and voted for the Court candidate for Speaker on 25 October 1705. He supported the Court side over the 'place clause' of the regency bill on 18 February 1706. At the 1708 British general election, he was returned unopposed and continued to support the Whig administration acting as teller twice in the first session. He voted for the naturalization of the Palatines in 1709 and for the impeachment of Dr Sacheverell in 1710. He did not seek re-election at the 1710 British general election, and retired to his Warwickshire estates.

== Death and legacy ==
Cullen died on 15 October 1730, and was buried at Upton. He had one daughter, Mary, who married Sir John Dutton, 2nd Baronet but no male heir, so the baronetcy became extinct. He left as his heir his nephew Thomas Bedford of the Middle Temple.

Parliament of England
| Preceded by The Lord Cutts; Edward Russell | Member of Parliament for Cambridgeshire; 1697–1707; With: The Lord Cutts 1697-1707; Granado Pigot 1702-1705; John Bromley 1705-1707 | Succeeded by Parliament of Great Britain |
Parliament of Great Britain
| Preceded by Parliament of England | Member of Parliament for Cambridgeshire; 1707–1710; With: John Bromley | Succeeded by John Bromley; John Jenyns |
Baronetage of England
| Preceded by John Cullen | Baronet (of East Sheen); 1677-1730 | Extinct |
