= Jennings (disambiguation) =

Jennings is a surname.

Jennings may also refer to:

== Places ==
=== Australia ===
- Jennings, New South Wales, a town

=== Caribbean ===
- Jennings, Antigua and Barbuda, a small settlement

=== United States ===
- Jennings, Florida, a town in Florida
- Jennings County, Indiana, a county in Indiana
- Jennings, Kansas, a city in northwestern Kansas
- Jennings, Anne Arundel County, Maryland, an incorporated community in Maryland
- Jennings, Garrett County, Maryland, an incorporated area in Maryland
- Jennings, Louisiana, a city in Louisiana near Lake Charles
- Jennings, Missouri, a city in Missouri near St. Louis
- Jennings, Oklahoma, a town in Pawnee County, Oklahoma
- Jennings, Wisconsin, an incorporated community in the town of Schoepke, Wisconsin
- Jennings Creek, a stream in Ohio
- Jennings Environmental Education Center, a state park in Pennsylvania
- Jennings Township (disambiguation)

== Other uses ==
- Jennings (novel series), by Anthony Buckeridge
- Bryco Arms/Jennings Firearms/Jimenez Arms, a former firearms manufacturer in California
- Jennings Brewery, Cumbria, England
- Jennings Musical Instruments
- William M. Jennings Trophy, a National Hockey League trophy
- Jennings, a steam engine character from Thomas the Tank Engine, created by Wilbert Awdry

== See also ==
- Jenyns, a surname
