= William Ruck-Keene =

Royal Navy Admiral (1867–1935)

Admiral William Ruck-Keene MVO
- Born: William George Elmhirst Ruck-Keene; 30 January 1867
- Died: 30 July 1935 (aged 68)
- Military career
- Allegiance: United Kingdom
- Branch: Royal Navy
- Rank: Admiral
- Commands: HMS Opossum, HMS Superb, HMS Bacchante, Admiralty yacht HMS Enchantress, HMS Cochrane, and the Royal Naval College, Dartmouth
- Conflicts: First World War
- Awards: Member of the Royal Victorian Order

William George Elmhirst Ruck-Keene MVO (30 January 1867 – 30 January 1935) was an Admiral of the Royal Navy.

From 1896 to 1916, he commanded naval vessels, primarily armoured cruisers, with a three-year break during which he trained cadets at the Royal Naval College, Osborne. His final command, from 1916 to 1919, was as Captain of the Royal Naval College, Dartmouth. In 1918, Ruck-Keene was promoted to Rear-Admiral, and he retired in 1920. While on the Retired List, he received two additional promotions and attained the rank of full Admiral in 1927.

== Career ==
Born in Henley-on-Thames, Ruck-Keene was the son of Lieutenant-Colonel Edmund Ruck-Keene. His father was a descendant of Edmund Keene (1714–1781), who served as the Master of Peterhouse, Cambridge, and later the Bishop of Ely. His great-grandfather, the barrister Benjamin Keene (1753–1837), married Mary Ruck in 1780, and about 1837 his grandfather, the Rev. Charles Edmund Keene, changed the family name to Ruck-Keene by royal licence. His father was the eldest of six brothers.

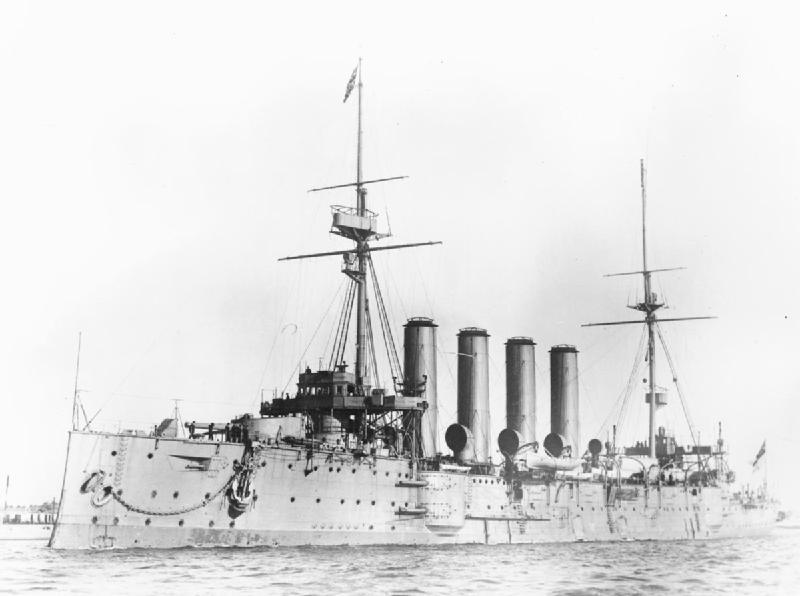
HMS Bacchante, Ruck-Keene's command from 1907 to 1910.

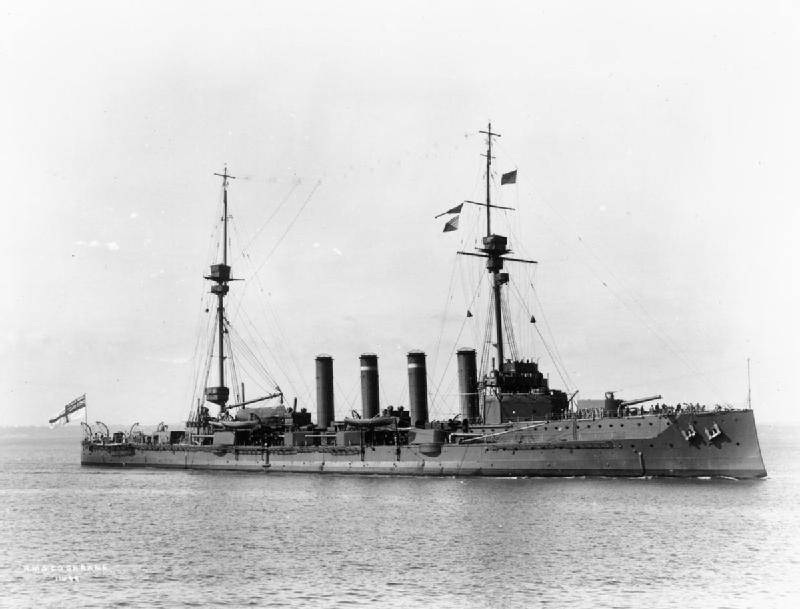
HMS Cochrane, Ruck-Keene's ship from 1912 to 1915.

The young Ruck-Keene was educated at Stubbington House School, known at the time as "the cradle of the Navy", from where he entered the Royal Navy as a Midshipman. On 1 July 1890 he was posted to the Royal Yacht Victoria and Albert and in August was promoted to Lieutenant. On 8 July 1896 he was appointed Flag Lieutenant to Vice-Admiral Edward Seymour for Annual Manœuvres and in August 1896 was given his first command, HMS Opossum, a newly launched Sunfish-class destroyer. He was promoted to Commander on 6 November 1901 and was given a series of short-lasting commands of destroyers. He was appointed in command of the HMS Falcon on 9 January 1903, serving in the instructional flotilla. On 12 March 1903 he was posted to take command of the elderly ironclad battleship HMS Superb, and on the same day was also appointed as Executive Officer at the nascent Royal Naval College, Osborne, which opened in the late summer.

Ruck-Keene's command of Superb ended on 1 August 1903, leaving him free to take up his duties at the new officer cadet training college when it opened at the beginning of September. He was promoted to Captain on 30 June 1906 and in January 1907 took command of HMS Bacchante, an armoured cruiser, and was also made Flag Captain to Rear-Admiral Sir Henry Barry of the 6th Cruiser Squadron, remaining as Flag Captain to Admiral Sir Henry Jackson when he took over the squadron from Barry in 1908. On 4 May 1909 he was appointed a Member of the Royal Victorian Order, an honour in the personal gift of the king, Edward VII, and remained in command of Bacchante until October 1910. In April 1911 he took command of the Admiralty yacht Enchantress, then in August 1912 of HMS Cochrane, another armoured cruiser.

The Great War broke out in August 1914. On 27 June 1915, Admiral Jellicoe, Commander-in-Chief of the Grand Fleet, shared with Sir Henry Jackson other officers' concerns that Ruck-Keene had become "lazy, lacks energy & has run to seed & is nervous". On 30 June 1915 Ruck-Keene's command of Cochrane was terminated, and it was not until 21 February 1916 that he was given a new command, HMS Drake, an elderly armoured cruiser. Three months later, with effect from 31 May 1916, Rucke-Keene was appointed as Captain of the Royal Naval College, Dartmouth, where he remained until 21 January 1919, after the end of the war.

In June 1917 a meeting of the Board of Admiralty had debated whether Ruck-Keene had a future in the Royal Navy. On 1 January 1918 Ruck-Keene was promoted to Rear-Admiral, and he continued his service career until 17 February 1920, when he joined the Retired List at his own request. He was promoted to Vice-Admiral on the Retired List in October 1923 and Admiral on the Retired List in August 1927.
