= 2nd Duke of Newcastle =

2nd Duke of Newcastle may refer to:

- Henry Cavendish, 2nd Duke of Newcastle (1630–1691), English politician
- Henry Pelham-Clinton, 2nd Duke of Newcastle (1720–1794), British nobleman
