= Sir Robert Clarke, 2nd Baronet =

British politician

Sir Robert Clarke, 2nd Baronet (1683 – November 1746) was a British politician who sat in the House of Commons from 1717 to 1722.

== Early life ==
Clarke was the elder son of Sir Samuel Clarke, 1st Baronet of Snailwell and his wife Mary Thompson, daughter of Robert Thompson of Newington Green, Middlesex. In 1719, he succeeded his father as baronet. He was admitted at Sidney Sussex College, Cambridge on 12 December 1701, aged 18 and was also admitted at Gray's Inn in 1701. He married Mary Barnardiston, only daughter of Arthur Barnardiston of Hoxton in around 1712.

== Political career ==
Clarke was returned unopposed as a Whig Member of Parliament (MP) for Cambridgeshire at a by election on 18 November 1717. He was defeated at the 1722 general election, and never stood again.

== Family ==
Clarke died in November 1746. By his wife he had ten children. He was succeeded in the baronetcy successively by his sons Samuel and Robert. After the death of his last surviving son Arthur, the sixth baronet, the title became extinct.

Parliament of Great Britain
Preceded by John Bromley; John Jenyns	Member of Parliament for Cambridgeshire; 1717 – 1722; With: John Bromley 1717–1718; Francis Whichcote 1718–1722	Succeeded by Lord Harley; Sir John Hynde Cotton, Bt
Baronetage of England
Preceded by Samuel Clarke	Baronet (of Snailwell); 1719–1746	Succeeded by Samuel Clarke
