= Charles Cadogan, 2nd Earl Cadogan =

British noble (1749–1832)

Charles Henry Sloane Cadogan, 2nd Earl Cadogan (29 November 1749 – 23 December 1832) was a British nobleman, styled Viscount Chelsea from 1800 to 1807.

The eldest child of Charles Cadogan, 3rd Baron Cadogan and Frances Bromley, he was baptised on 13 December 1749 at St George's, Hanover Square. He became 2nd Earl Cadogan on the death of his father in 1807.

He served briefly in the British Army in his youth. By the time he had inherited it, he had already become a lunatic. He died unmarried in Enfield and so his title passed to his half-brother George Cadogan, 3rd Earl Cadogan. He was buried at Chelsea on 3 January 1833 and his will was probated in July of that year.

== Notes ==
Peerage of Great Britain
Preceded by Charles Cadogan	Earl Cadogan; 1807–1832	Succeeded by George Cadogan
