= Earl Cadogan =

Title in the Peerage of Great Britain

Earldom of Cadogan
- Quarterly: 1st and 4th gules, a lion rampant reguardant or (for Cadogan); 2nd and 3rd argent, three boar's heads couped sable.
- Creation date: 27 December 1800
- Creation: Second
- Created by: George III
- Peerage: Peerage of Great Britain
- First holder: Charles Cadogan, 3rd Baron Cadogan
- Present holder: Edward Charles Cadogan, 9th Earl
- Heir apparent: George Edward Charles Diether Cadogan, Viscount Chelsea
- Remainder to: Heirs male of the first earl's body lawfully begotten
- Subsidiary titles: Viscount Chelsea; Baron Oakley
- Former seat: Culford Park
- Motto: QUI INVIDET MINOR EST ("He who envies is the inferior")

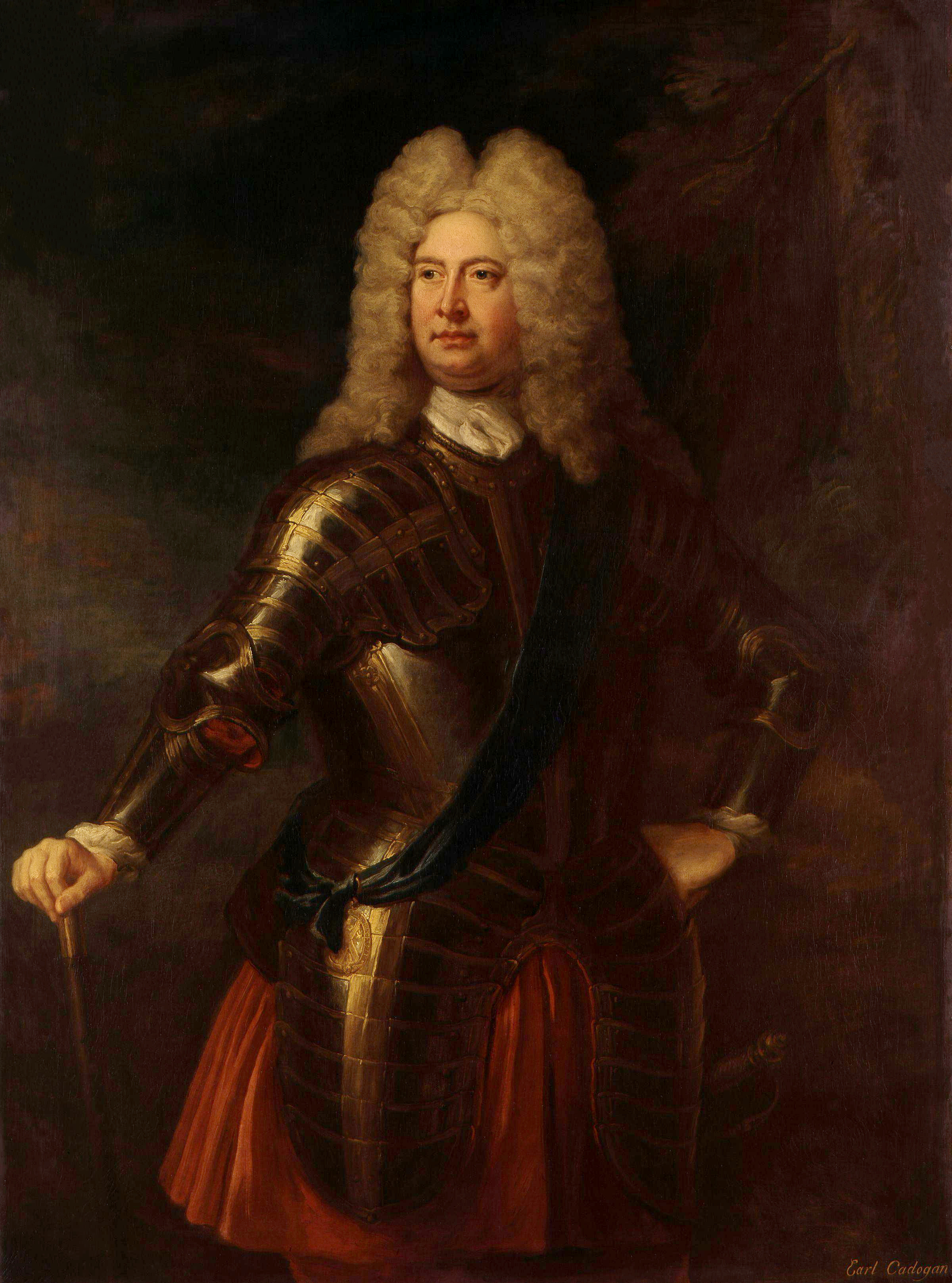
William Cadogan, 1st Earl Cadogan

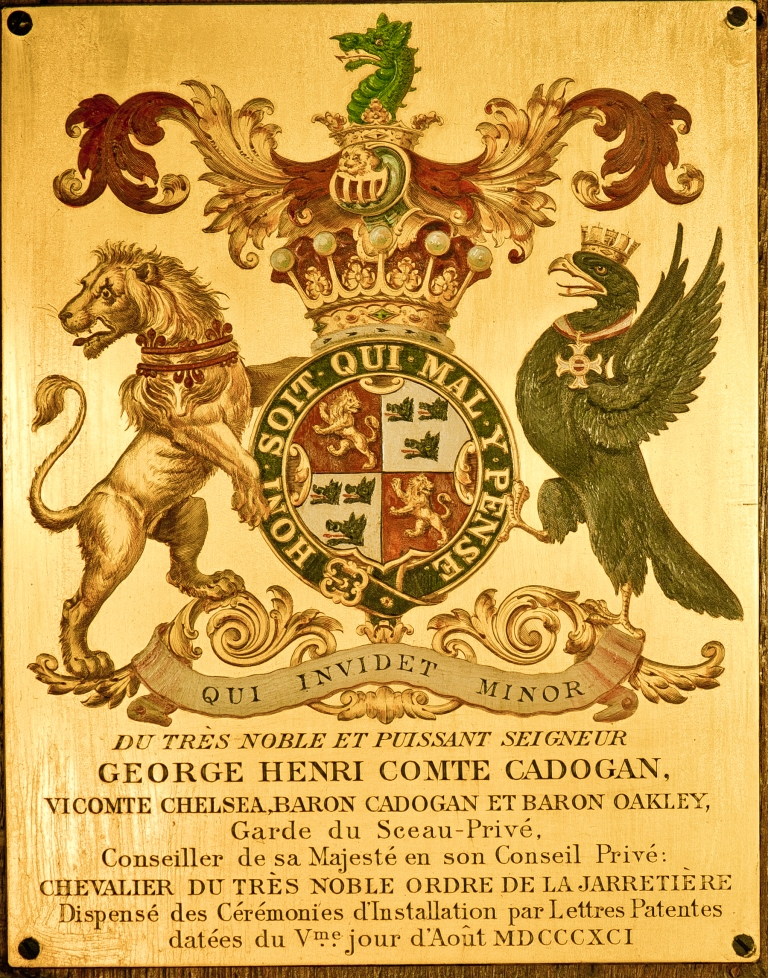
Garter stall plate of the 5th Earl Cadogan (1840–1915), in St George's Chapel, Windsor Castle. Arms: Quarterly 1 & 2: Gules, a lion rampant reguardant or (Cadogan); 2 & 3: Argent, three boar's heads couped sable. Crest: Out of a ducal coronet or a dragon's head vert The sinister supporter wears the Cross of the Austrian Military Order of Maria Theresa, commemorating the naval services of the 3rd Earl

Racing Colours of Lord Cadogan

Earl Cadogan /kəˈdʌɡən/ is a title that has been created twice in the Peerage of Great Britain for the Cadogan family. The second creation, in 1800, was for Charles Cadogan, 3rd Baron Cadogan.

== History ==
Of Welsh origin, the family name was spelt Cadwgan until the early 15th century. According to Burke's Peerage, the family descends from: Rees ap Griffith ap Llewelyn ap Meredith Bengoch ap Howell (Lord of Penbuallt) ap Sitsylt (Lord of Builth) ap Llewelyn (Lord of Builth) ap Cadwgan ap Elystan Glodrydd ("The Renowned"), Prince of Fferreg, of Dol-y-Gaer, Breconshire.

Major William Cadogan (1601–1661) was a cavalry officer in Oliver Cromwell's army. His son Henry Cadogan was a barrister in Dublin. His eldest son William Cadogan was a noted soldier, politician and diplomat. He was a general in the army and fought in the War of the Spanish Succession and also served as Ambassador to the Netherlands and as Master-General of the Ordnance. In 1716, he was raised to the Peerage of Great Britain as Baron Cadogan, of Reading in the County of Berkshire, with normal remainder to the heirs male of his body. In 1718, he was further honoured when he was made Baron Cadogan, of Oakley in the County of Buckingham, with remainder, failing heirs male of his own, to his younger brother Charles Cadogan and the heirs male of his body, and Viscount Caversham, in the County of Oxford, and Earl Cadogan, in the County of Denbigh, with remainder to the heirs male of his body. These titles were also in the Peerage of Great Britain.

Lord Cadogan had two daughters but no sons, so on his death in 1726, three titles—the barony of 1716, the viscountcy, and earldom—became extinct. However, he was succeeded in the barony of 1718 according to the special remainder by his brother Charles, the second Baron. He was a General of the Horse and also represented Reading and Newport, Isle of Wight, in the House of Commons. Cadogan married Elizabeth, second daughter and heiress of the prominent physician and collector Sir Hans Sloane. Through this marriage the Sloane estates in Chelsea and Knightsbridge came into the Cadogan family, and these have been the basis of the family wealth ever since.

His son, the third Baron, sat as member of parliament for Cambridge and served as Master of the Mint. In 1800 the earldom of Cadogan held by his uncle was revived when he was created Viscount Chelsea, in the County of Middlesex, and Earl Cadogan. These titles were in the Peerage of Great Britain. His youngest son, the third Earl (who succeeded his half-brother in 1832), was an admiral in the Royal Navy. In 1831, one year before he succeeded in the earldom, he was raised to the Peerage of the United Kingdom in his own right as Baron Oakley, of Caversham in the County of Oxford. He was succeeded by his eldest son, the fourth Earl. He was a Conservative politician and served under Lord Derby and Benjamin Disraeli as whip, Captain of the Yeomen of the Guard from 1866 to 1868.

His eldest son, the fifth Earl, was also a noted Conservative politician. He held office under Disraeli and later Lord Salisbury as Under-Secretary of State for War, Under-Secretary of State for the Colonies, Lord Privy Seal and Lord Lieutenant of Ireland (with a seat in the cabinet). His second son Henry Cadogan, Viscount Chelsea, heir apparent to the earldom from 1878 to 1908, represented Bury St Edmunds in Parliament as a Conservative, but died in 1908, seven years before his father. His only son Edward, Viscount Chelsea, died in 1910 at the age of seven. Lord Cadogan was therefore succeeded by his third but eldest surviving son, the sixth Earl. As of 2023, the titles are held by the latter's great-grandson, the ninth Earl, who succeeded his father in 2023.

Several other members of the Cadogan family have gained distinction. Lady Sarah Cadogan, daughter of the first Earl of the first creation, married Charles Lennox, 2nd Duke of Richmond, and was the mother of the famous Lennox sisters (and also the grandmother of Charles James Fox). Sir George Cadogan, second son of the third Earl, was a general in the army. Two further members represented seats in the House of Commons. (Note: Frederick William Cadogan, third son of the third Earl, represented Cricklade, Wiltshire, and Sir Edward Cadogan, seventh son of the fifth Earl was elected by the Reading, Finchley and Bolton seats, in the 19th and 20th centuries respectively.) Sir Alexander Cadogan, eighth and youngest son of the fifth Earl, was the most senior civil servant to a troubled government department (Permanent Under-Secretary for Foreign Affairs) between 1938 and 1946, that of World War II and his personal notes reflect his part in shaping the policies which aided the survival of Britain and its British Empire's resources in Asia during that war.

The Earls Cadogan are wealthy landowners, having planned and developed and still owning Cadogan Estates, which covers much of Chelsea and parts of the much smaller area of Knightsbridge, and second only to the Duke of Westminster as Central London's richest landlords (whose surname, Grosvenor, is also closely associated with some of the most ornate London architecture).

The family seat was Culford Park, near Culford, Suffolk.

The rampant lion in the Earl Cadogan coat of arms is shown in the badge of Chelsea F.C.

== Horse racing ==
In horse racing the family who own horses use the colour Eton blue, which is similar to the turquoise of Cambridge University, registered c. 1889.

== Earls Cadogan, First Creation (1718) ==
- William Cadogan, 1st Earl Cadogan (1672–1726)

== Barons Cadogan (1716) ==
- William Cadogan, 1st Earl Cadogan (1672–1726)
- Charles Cadogan, 2nd Baron Cadogan (1685–1776)
- Charles Sloane Cadogan, 3rd Baron Cadogan (1728–1807) (created Earl Cadogan in 1800)

== Earls Cadogan, Second Creation (1800) ==
- Charles Sloane Cadogan, 1st Earl Cadogan (1728–1807)
- Charles Henry Sloane Cadogan, 2nd Earl Cadogan (1749–1832)
- George Cadogan, 3rd Earl Cadogan (1783–1864)
- Henry Charles Cadogan, 4th Earl Cadogan (1812–1873)
- George Henry Cadogan, 5th Earl Cadogan (1840–1915)
- Gerald Oakley Cadogan, 6th Earl Cadogan (1869–1933)
- William Gerald Charles Cadogan, 7th Earl Cadogan (1914–1997)
- Charles Gerald John Cadogan, 8th Earl Cadogan (1937–2023)
- Edward Charles Cadogan, 9th Earl Cadogan (b.1966)

== Present peer ==
Edward Charles Cadogan, 9th Earl Cadogan (born 10 May 1966) is the son of the 8th Earl Cadogan and his wife Lady Philippa Dorothy Bluet Wallop, a daughter of Gerard Wallop, 9th Earl of Portsmouth. He was educated at St David's College, Llandudno, and served with the Royal Air Force during the Gulf War. He was styled as Viscount Chelsea between 1997 and 2023, when he succeeded to the peerages. He was appointed Deputy lieutenant of Greater London in 2012, becoming Representative Deputy Lieutenant for Kensington & Chelsea in 2022.

The heir apparent is the present holder's eldest son George Edward Charles Diether Cadogan, Viscount Chelsea (b. 1995).

== See also ==
- Cadogan Estates
