= George Cadogan, 3rd Earl Cadogan =

Royal Navy Admiral and earl (1783–1864)

Admiral The Right Honourable The Earl Cadogan CB
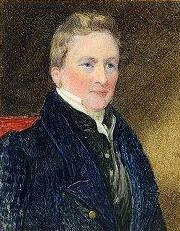
- Born: 5 May 1783; London, England
- Died: 15 September 1864 (aged 81); London, England
- Military career
- Allegiance: United Kingdom
- Branch: Royal Navy
- Service years: 1796 to 1864
- Rank: Admiral
- Conflicts: French Revolutionary Wars; Napoleonic Wars; Adriatic campaign
- Awards: Knight of the Order of Maria Theresa, Companion of the Order of the Bath

Admiral George Cadogan, 3rd Earl Cadogan, CB (5 May 1783 – 15 September 1864) was a British Royal Navy officer and politician of the mid-nineteenth century who first gained fame for his service in the Adriatic campaign of the Napoleonic Wars in command of HMS Havannah. Cadogan later served as aide-de-camp to successive British monarchs and received promotion to full admiral.

The son of Charles Cadogan, 3rd Baron Cadogan and his second wife Mary Churchill, Cadogan inherited his father's titles from his half-brother Charles in 1832 and became the third Earl Cadogan. He was also created 1st Baron Oakley of Caversham on 10 September 1831. Later in life, Cadogan was elected to become a Fellow of the Society of Antiquaries of London and died in 1864.

== Life ==
George Cadogan was born in 1783 at St James's Square in London, the eighth son of Charles Cadogan, 3rd Baron Cadogan and the second son of Mary Churchill, the Baron's second wife. George would follow his brother Thomas, 29 years his senior, into the Royal Navy, although Thomas had drowned in an accident in 1782. Joining the Navy aged 13 in 1796, Cadogan served in the French Revolutionary Wars.

In 1804 Commander Cadogan was captain of the 18-gun ship-sloop HMS Cyane. On 11 November 1804, Cyane was off Marie-Galante when she captured the 18-gun French privateer brig Bonaparte. However, on 12 May 1805, the French captured Caddogan and Cyane. She was cruising between Barbados and Martinique when she had the misfortune to encounter a French fleet under Admiral Villeneuve. The French frigates Hortense and Hermione so out-gunned Cyane that Cadogan had no choice but to strike his colours.

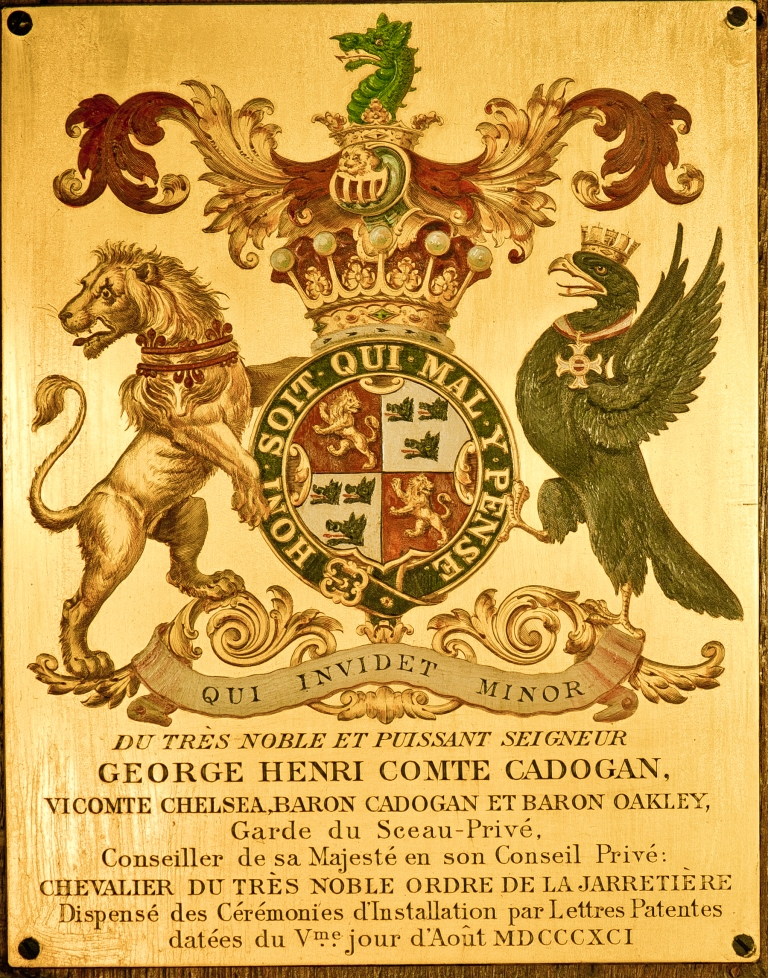
Cross of the Austrian Military Order of Maria Theresa in the arms of the Earls Cadogan, commemorating the naval services of the 3rd Earl

By 1807, George was a Post Captain and in 1811 he was given command of the newly commissioned HMS Havannah, a 36-gun fifth rate frigate. In 1812 Havannah was ordered to the Adriatic, to reinforce the British squadron there that had already defeated the French forces in the area at several battles in 1811. Havannah was based at the island of Lissa, but in 1813 Cadogan was ordered to operate against the Northern Italian coastline in conjunction with the approaching forces of the Austrian Empire during the War of the Sixth Coalition.

Cadogan was highly successful in this endeavour, destroying or capturing numerous French and Italian ships off Vasto and other ports on the French-held coastline. In October 1813, Cadogan was attached to the force under Thomas Fremantle that forced the surrender of Trieste and later in the year Havannah successfully captured Zara from the French garrison in a daring coastal raid. In 1815, Cadogan returned to Britain and was made Companion of the Order of the Bath.

He is said in Rome in January 1816, received by the Pope on Monday 29th together with Col. George Wittmore and some other British Officers.

The untimely deaths of six of Cadogan's seven brothers brought him the title of Earl Cadogan (which his father had been awarded in 1800) on the death of his eldest brother Charles Cadogan, 2nd Earl Cadogan in 1832. Cadogan took his seat in the House of Lords, but remained a prominent naval officer, continuing to rise in the service and serving as aide-de-camp to King William IV between 1830 and 1837 and Queen Victoria between 1837 and 1841. By 1851, Cadogan was a vice-admiral and in 1852 he became a fellow of the Society of Antiquaries of London.

Cadogan died a full admiral in 1864 in his London home in Piccadilly. As a naval captain in 1809 he had fought a duel with Lord Paget, who had seduced Cadogan's sister, Lady Charlotte.

== Family ==
Cadogan was married to Honoria Louisa Blake and the couple had five children, the eldest surviving son of whom, Henry, became on his death 4th Earl Cadogan and the fifth General Sir George Cadogan of the British Army. His youngest son Frederick William Cadogan sat as member of parliament for Cricklade.

== Citations ==
Peerage of the United Kingdom
New creation	Baron Oakley; 1831–1864	Succeeded by Henry Charles Cadogan
Peerage of Great Britain
Preceded by Charles Cadogan	Earl Cadogan; 1832–1864	Succeeded by Henry Charles Cadogan
