= Henry Bromley, 1st Baron Montfort =

British landowner and Whig politician

Henry Bromley, 1st Baron Montfort (20 August 1705 – 1 January 1755), of Horseheath Hall, Cambridgeshire, was a British landowner and Whig politician who sat in the House of Commons from 1727 until 1741 when he was raised to the peerage as Baron Montfort. He was a cricketer but also a gambler who killed himself in the face of financial ruin.

== Early life ==
Bromley was the only son of John Bromley MP, and his wife Mercy Bromley, the daughter and eventual sole heir of William Bromley MP (1656–1707). His mother died in childbirth and his father died in 1718. One of his guardians was Samuel Shepheard. He was educated at Eton College, which he entered in 1718, and was admitted to Clare College, Cambridge on 29 January 1723/4. He married Frances Wyndham, daughter of Thomas Wyndham and sister and heiress of Sir Francis Wyndham, 4th Baronet, of Trent, Dorset on 18 March 1728. She died in a childbed after the birth of their only son, and was buried in St Margaret's, Westminster.

== Career ==
In1727 Bromley was elected in a contest as Whig Member of Parliament for Cambridgeshire with Samuel Shepheard, but was defeated at Cambridge where he also stood. He was Lord-Lieutenant of Cambridgeshire between 1729 and 1742 and became the chief Whig election manager in Cambridgeshire. His first reported speech, said to be ‘well worded’ and ‘studied’ was made on 27 February 1730 in the Dunkirk debate, when he was put up by Walpole to sidetrack an opposition motion. In 1731, he was one of the Members ordered by the House to draw up a bill for encouraging the sugar colonies, presumably because of his West Indian interests (as a result of his inheritance from his father he was an absentee slave-owner on Barbados), and this was the basis of the 1733 Molasses Act. He spoke on the Address in 1732 and moved the address on the Princess Royal's marriage in 1733 with another ‘studied’ speech. At the 1734 British general election, he was returned unopposed. He moved the Address in 1740, and in 1741 warmly opposed the proposal that Walpole should leave the House while the motion for his dismissal was being debated. He was considered a ‘useful speaker for the Court’. After he was raised to the House of Lords he carried on managing the Cambridgeshire elections, and is said to have spent £100,000 out of his own pocket in supporting the government interest in the county and the Cambridge corporation. In May 1741 he was raised to the peerage as Lord Montfort, Baron of Horseheath, in the County of Cambridge.

== Cricket ==
Montfort was active in cricket, both as a player (for London Cricket Club) and as a patron. In the 1743 season, he was the patron and captain of a London, Middlesex & Surrey XI for the match against a Kent XI led by Lord John Sackville at Bromley Common on Thursday, 16 May. The stakes were £500 a side. Montfort's team scored 97 and Kent replied with 69. In their second innings, Montfort's team had reached 112–4 by eight o'clock when the patrons agreed to "leave off and play it out the next day". In fact, the play did not restart on Friday because Sackville conceded defeat. There are no other cricketing references to Montfort.

== Later life, death and legacy ==
Through his mother Lord Montfort inherited the manor of Great Malvern in Malvern, Worcestershire, from his ancestor Sir Thomas Bromley and sold it, in about 1740, to Lord Foley. He spent extravagantly on Horseheath. His gambling, in which he was supposed to be ‘the sharpest genius of his time’, also consumed vast sums of money. He was seriously short of funds by the end of 1754, and applied to Newcastle for some employment. When Newcastle was unable to provide anything it was said he was very reasonable but seemed dejected. On the following morning, 1 January 1755, he wrote his will, and asked his lawyer if it would hold good even if he shot himself. After being told that it would, he went into the next room and blew his brains out. He left debts of £30,000, with an estate out of repair and in a very ruinous condition. He was succeeded in the barony by his only son, Thomas. His daughter, Frances, married Charles Cadogan, 1st Earl Cadogan.

Parliament of Great Britain
Preceded by Sir John Hynde Cotton, Bt; Samuel Shepheard	Member of Parliament for Cambridgeshire; 1727–1741; With: Samuel Shepheard	Succeeded by Samuel Shepheard; Soame Jenyns
Honorary titles
Preceded by The Earl of Lincoln	Lord-Lieutenant of Cambridgeshire; 1729–1742	Succeeded by The Duke of Newcastle
Peerage of Great Britain
New creation	Baron Montfort; 1741–1755	Succeeded by Thomas Bromley
