= Bottisham =

Village in Cambridgeshire, England

Coordinates: 52.221°N 0.261°E

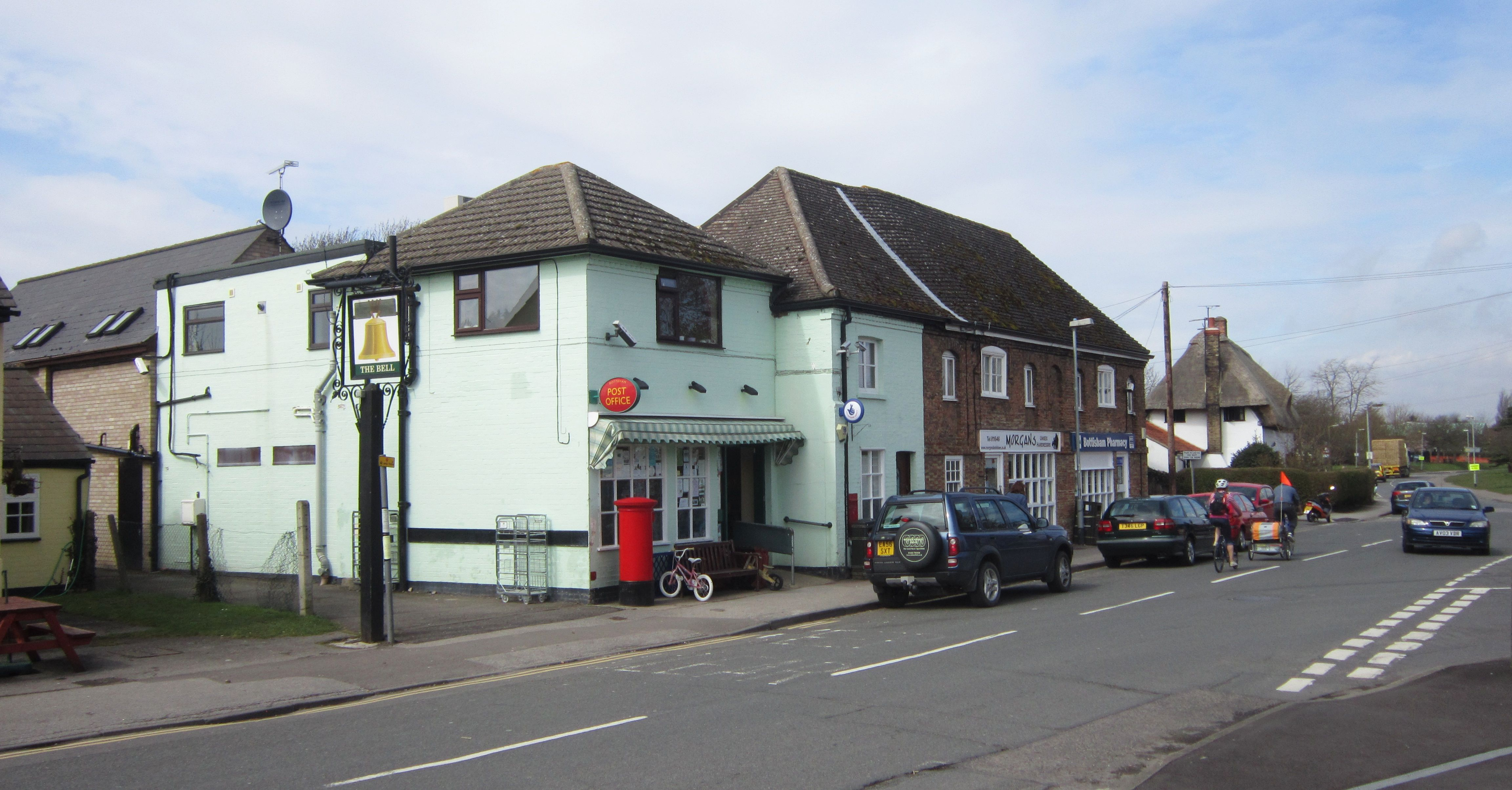
- Village centre

- Location within Cambridgeshire
- Population: 2,199 (2011)
- OS grid reference: TL543607
- Shire county: Cambridgeshire
- Region: East
- Country: England
- Sovereign state: United Kingdom
- Post town: CAMBRIDGE
- Postcode district: CB25
- Dialling code: 01223

Bottisham is a village and civil parish in the East Cambridgeshire district of Cambridgeshire, England, about 6 miles (10 km) east of Cambridge, halfway to Newmarket. According to the 2001 census it had a population of 1,983, including Chittering, increasing to 2,199 at the 2011 Census.

== Church ==
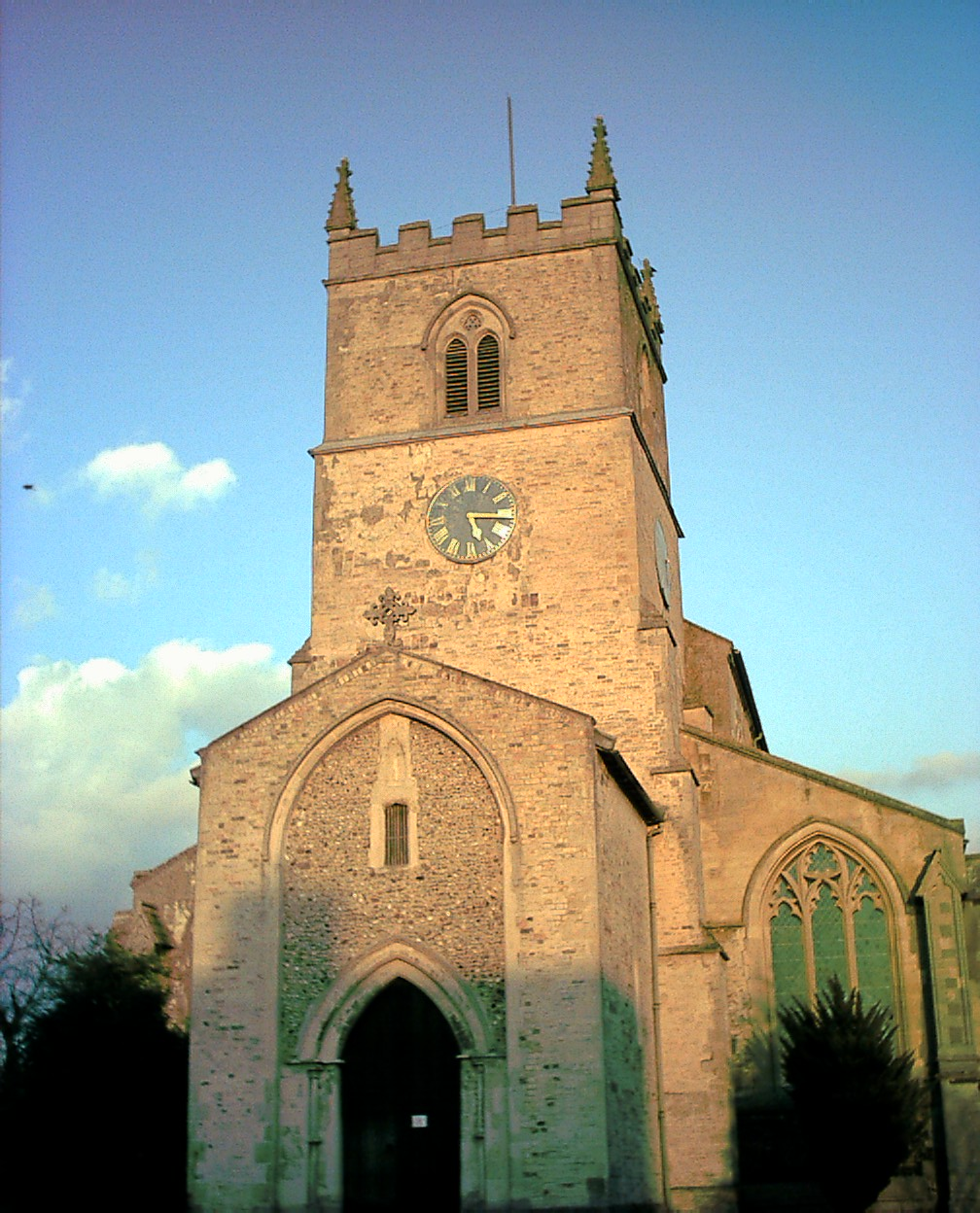

Bottisham has overhanging cottages and the tower of the Church of the Holy Trinity which has some of the finest fourteenth-century work in the county. The tower and the chancel with its stone seats are thirteenth century but the nave and aisles and porches are all from the fourteenth. The south aisle has a stone seat for the priest, a piscina, and in its floor an ancient coffin lid. Above the arcades is a clerestory of fluted lancet windows. There is a font and three old screens of the fourteenth century, two of oak and the other of stone, with three delicate open arches before the chancel. There is an iron-bound chest of 1790, and some fragments of carved stones, the oldest being a Norman tympanum.

A table tomb within the church has the mark of a vanished monumental brass portrait of Elias de Beckingham, who was said to be with one exception the only honest judge in the reign of King Edward I. Only he and one other were acquitted when every judge was charged by the king with bribery. A sculptured monument of three centuries later (1598/9) shows Margaret (née Coningsby) kneeling behind her second husband, Thomas Pledger, both in black robes and ruffs. Cherubs hold back the curtains of a stone canopy to show two children asleep with flowers in their hands, Leonard and Dorothea Alington (whose family had an estate nearby), of whom the inscription of 1638 tells:

These the world's strangers were, not here to dwell.
They tasted, like it not, and bade farewell.

The east window and a tablet close by are in memory of Colonel Soame Gambier-Jenyns, who rode (as a captain) down the Valley of Death at Balaclava, and survived. Other memorials to this family, whose home, Bottisham Hall, was rebuilt in 1797, show Sir Roger Jenyns and his wife sitting on their tomb holding hands, with dressing-gowns thrown over their night things as if they had just woken from sleep. Their son, Soame Jenyns, was for 38 years a member of parliament, a keen debater, and is remembered here by angels garlanding an urn.

There are some pictures and a description of the church at the Cambridgeshire Churches website.

== Education ==
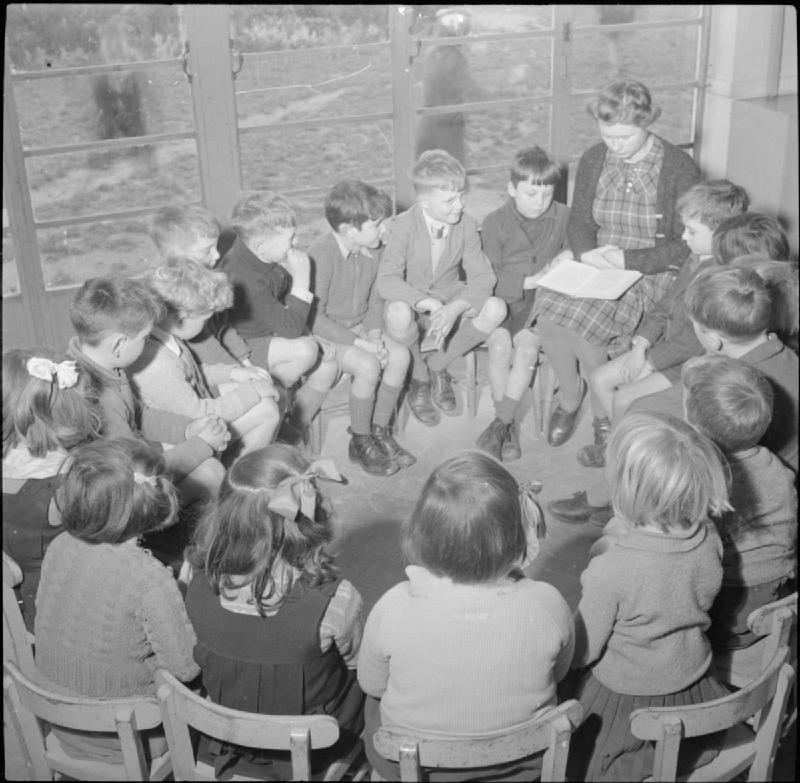
Bottisham Junior School, 1944

Bottisham is one of the group of villages in which the village colleges of Cambridgeshire were originally developed. Opened in 1937, Bottisham Village College was the second of Henry Morris' colleges. The first college was built at Sawston in 1930, and the idea of these magnificent buildings is to draw children over eleven from the villages round into an atmosphere in which they will develop a taste and a capacity for rural life and craftsmanship, with facilities for training themselves in whatever career they desire, and with opportunities for practising music or drama, cooking or needlework; the colleges also serve as adult educational and cultural centres – they act as a social focus for the life of the whole community. The buildings at Bottisham are charmingly planned so that all the principal rooms run round a curve and look out onto the playing field. Now, it is more of a community centre and a school.

== Housing ==
The Park Estate makes up just less than half of the houses in Bottisham and was built in the 1960s. The original concept was to have fairly large detached houses, with big open green spaces and a strong community. However, halfway through the development the building firm went out of business and a new one replaced it. This firm added many more houses than planned, more semi-detached and smaller, creating a more compact estate. Despite the changes to the plan it is now a large but open estate, with many community lawns and grassed areas. The estate itself is led by a horse-shoe shape road, Beechwood Avenue, which encloses the housing. At one end is the entrance to Bottisham Primary School, which moved to this location in the late 1970s having previously been next to the village college.

== See also ==
- HMS Bottisham, a Ham class minesweeper that was named after the village
- RAF Bottisham, a World War II airfield for the RAF in the 1940s
- Bottisham and Lode railway station, a disused railway station near Lode
