= Benjamin Keene (MP) =

British barrister and member of parliament

- Born: 1753
- Died: 21 November 1837 (aged 83–84)
- Burial place: Bartlow
- Education: Peterhouse, Cambridge
- Occupations: barrister and member of parliament
- Father: Edmund Keene, Bishop of Ely

Benjamin Keene (1753–1837) was a British barrister and member of parliament who sat in the House of Commons from 1776 to 1784.

== Early life ==
Keene was the eldest son of Rt. Rev. Edmund Keene, Bishop of Ely, and his wife Mary Andrews, daughter. of Lancelot Andrews of Edmonton. His uncle, Sir Benjamin Keene, MP was ambassador to Madrid. Keene was educated at Eton College from 1762 to 1770 and was admitted at Gray's Inn in 1767 and at Peterhouse, Cambridge on 6 October 1770. In 1774 he was awarded MA at Cambridge. He married Mary Ruck, daughter of George Ruck of Swyncombe, Oxfordshire on 18 March 1780, and succeeded his father in July 1780.

== Political career ==
Keene was elected as Member of Parliament for Cambridge at a by-election on 7 November 1776. He was re-elected for Cambridge at the 1780 general election. In 1784, he was a member of the St. Alban's Tavern group who tried to bring Fox and Pitt together. He did not stand in 1784 .

== Later life and legacy ==
Keene was High Sheriff of Cambridgeshire and Huntingdonshire in 1804.

In 1806 he leased Westoe Lodge in Castle Camps and by 1825 he had bought the freehold. Westoe Lodge became his main seat but was demolished within 30 years of his death.

He died on 21 November 1837. By his marriage to Mary Ruck he had two sons, Benjamin, an Army officer, and Charles Edmund, a clergyman of the Church of England. He also had three daughters, Frances, Sophie-Elizabeth, and Mary-Anne, who married Sir William Blackett, 5th Baronet. Admiral William Ruck-Keene (1867–1935) was one of his great-grandsons.

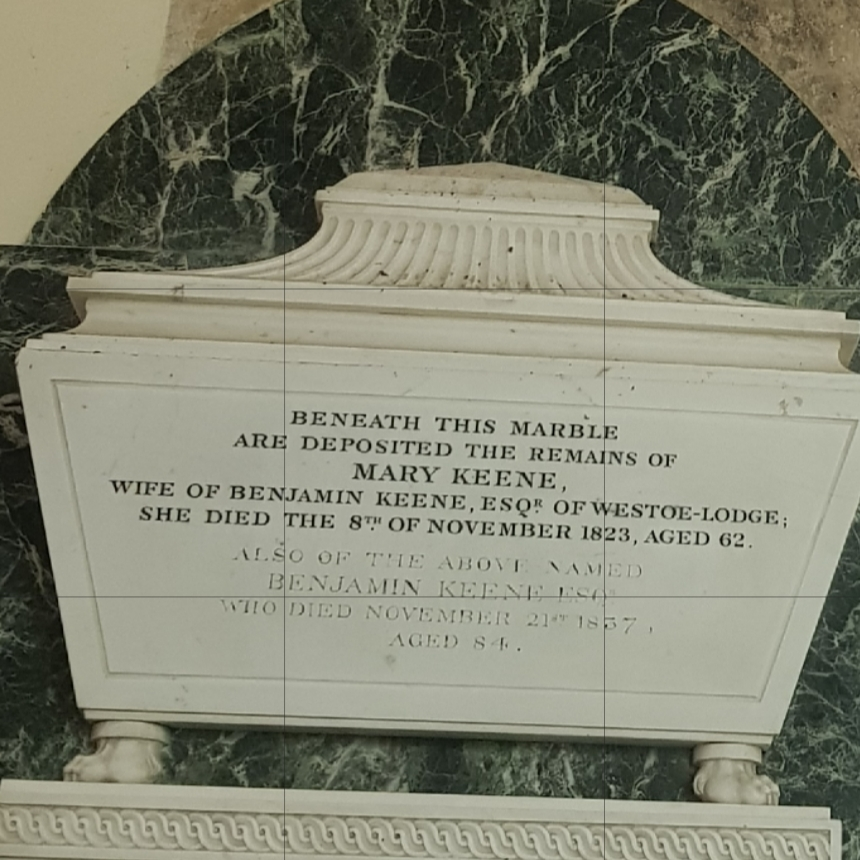
Memorial in Bartlow church

Parliament of Great Britain
Preceded by Soame Jenyns; Charles Cadogan	Member of Parliament for Cambridge; 1776–1784; With: Soame Jenyns; James Whorwood Adeane	Succeeded by James Whorwood Adeane; John Mortlock
