= Thomas Bromley, 2nd Baron Montfort =

British politician

Thomas Bromley, 2nd Baron Montfort, also known as Lord Montford, (January 1733 – 24 October 1799), was a British politician.

Bromley was the only son and heir of Henry Bromley, 1st Baron Montfort and Frances Wyndham, daughter of Thomas Wyndham and sister and heiress of Sir Francis Wyndham, 4th Baronet of Trent, Somerset. He was educated at Eton College from 1742 to 1748. He was returned to Parliament as one of the two representatives for Cambridge in 1754, a seat he held until the following year, when he entered the House of Lords at the age of 21 after his father had committed suicide. His seat in the Commons passed in an uncontested election to his brother-in-law Charles Cadogan, who was later raised in the peerage himself as the 1st Earl Cadogan.

In 1759 his political ally, Viscount Royston (later 2nd Earl of Hardwicke), who was Lord Lieutenant of Cambridgeshire, appointed Montfort Lieutenant-Colonel Commandant of the Cambridgeshire Militia, which was struggling to find enough officers among the county gentry. The regiment was eventually completed, but was never embodied for service during the Seven Years' War. After the war the officers resigned en masse, Royston declaring that Montfort's behaviour was impossible, and serving under him in the militia went against the grain with most people. The regiment was reformed in 1764 in time for the county to avoid paying a fine. Thereafter it carried out its annual training. However, at the training in May 1774 Montfort was insulted and knocked down by members of Cambridge University; his men hesitated to help him until urged on by some of the bystanders. Their action led to a riot. Town and gown riots were common in Cambridge, and Montfort was closely connected with the town corporation.

In 1775 Montfort fled to Paris to avoid his creditors, but clung onto the command of the militia because he could use its patronage to reward dependents and because the outbreak of the American War of Independence meant that there was the prospect of war service, with the consequent pay. However, when the militia were embodied in March 1778, Hardwicke forced Montfort to resign the command because no gentleman would serve under him, and there were consequently not enough officers. Hardwicke was uneasy at his removal, but was advised by Sir John Hynde Cotton, 4th Baronet that 'if there was no precedent for turning a peer out of a commission there was also none for such a peer having one'. Montfort had sold all his property in Cambridgeshire and so was no longer qualified for the position. Montfort complained that losing his command would mean a loss of five or six hundred pounds to him, but Hardwicke used his position to get promotion in the army for Montfort's son.

He bought a seven-bedroom home in Sunbury on Thames facing the Thames to serve as his home whilst on business in London in 1783. The house was later acquired by Captain Lendy and has become Lendy Place. An adjoining road built on part of its gardens is named Montford Close.

He died in October 1799, aged 66, and was succeeded in the barony by his only son, Henry. Lord Montfort had married Mary Anne Blake, sister of MP Sir Patrick Blake, 1st Baronet, of Langham, Suffolk at Marylebone in 1772.

Parliament of Great Britain
Preceded by Viscount Dupplin; Charles Cadogan	Member of Parliament for Cambridge; 1754–1755; With: Viscount Dupplin	Succeeded by Viscount Dupplin; Charles Cadogan
Peerage of Great Britain
Preceded by Henry Bromley	Baron Montfort; 1755–1799	Succeeded by Henry Bromley
