= Henry Clinton, 7th Earl of Lincoln =

English noble (1684–1728)

The Right Honorable The Earl of Lincoln KG PC
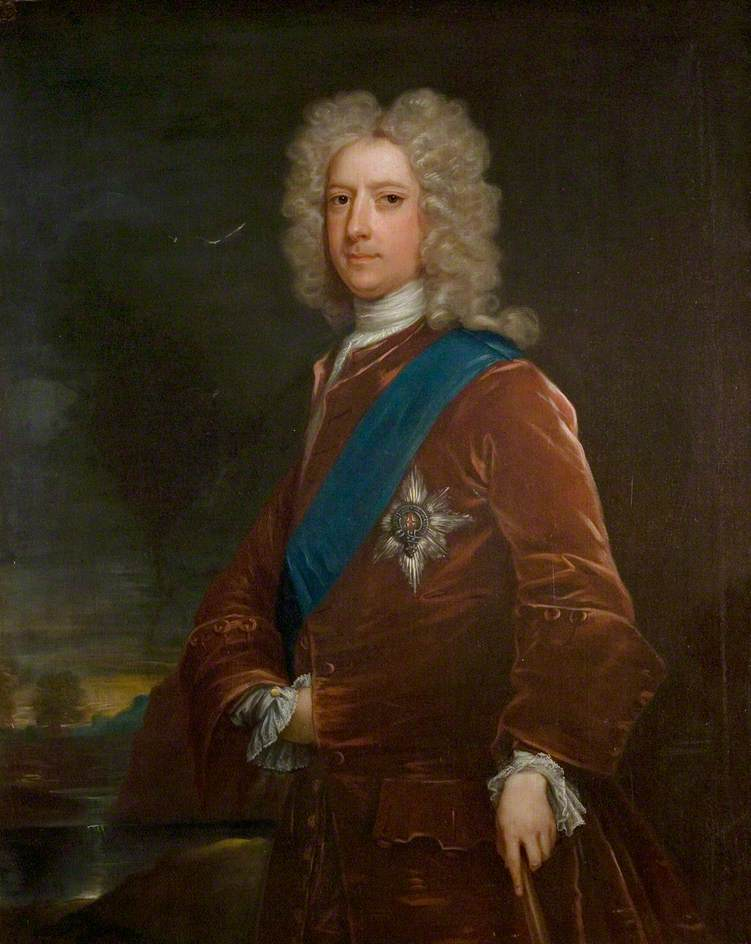
- Portrait by Godfrey Kneller, 18th Century

Lord Lieutenant of Cambridgeshire
- In office 28 March 1728 – 7 September 1728
- Preceded by: The Earl of Orford
- Succeeded by: The Lord Montfort

Personal details
- Born: Henry Fiennes Clinton; 1684 England
- Died: 7 September 1728 (aged 43–44) England
- Spouse: Lucy Pelham (m. 1717)
- Children: Henry Pelham-Clinton, 2nd Duke of Newcastle
- Parent(s): Francis Clinton, 6th Earl of Lincoln; Susan Penyston

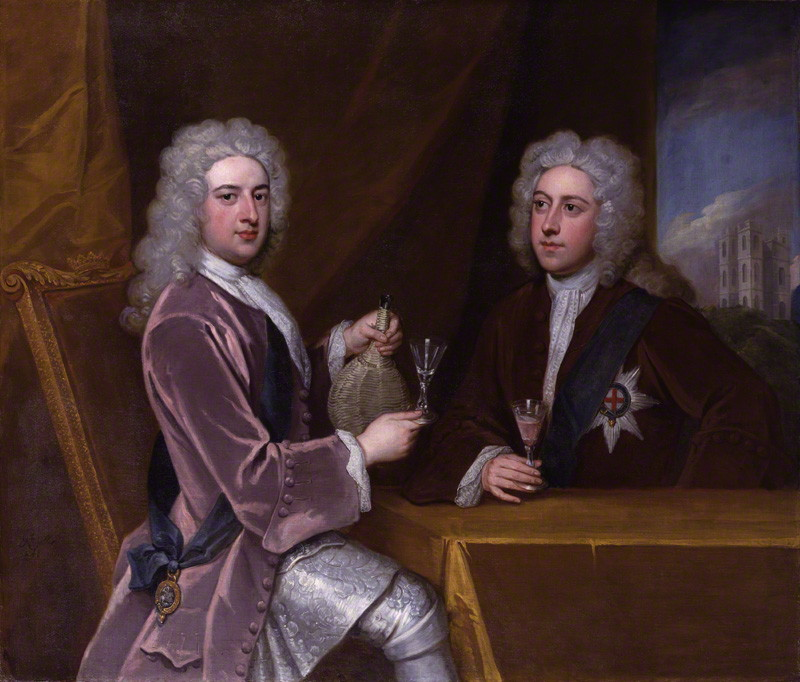
Lord Lincoln (right), and his brother-in-law, the Duke of Newcastle.

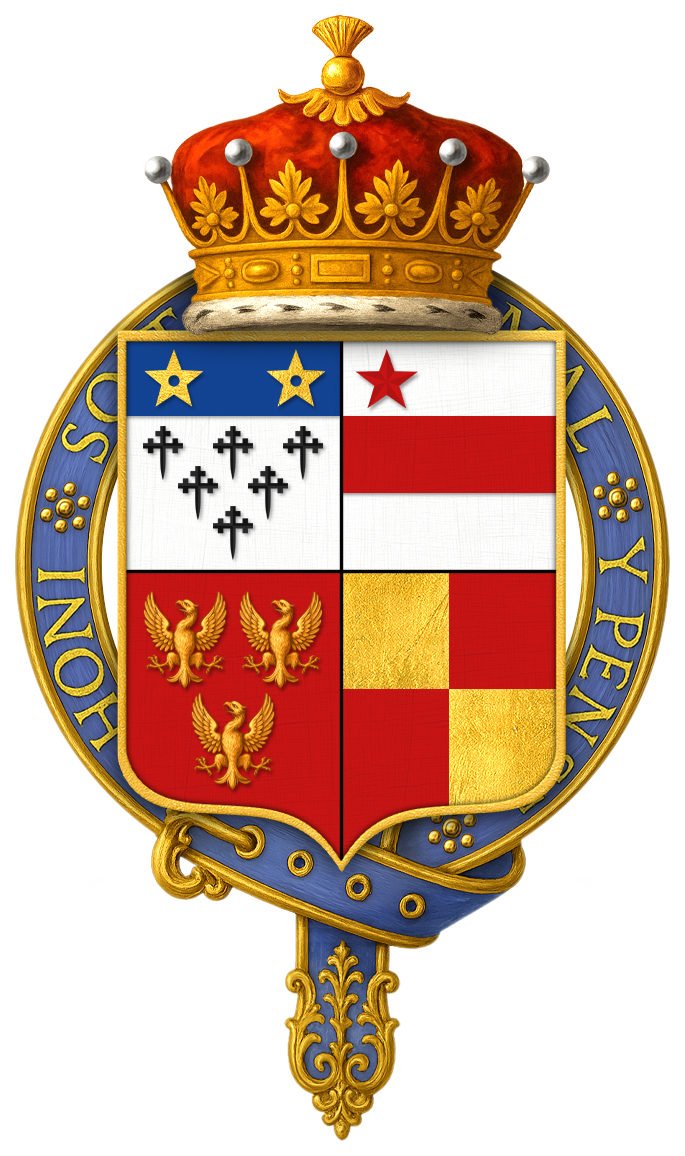
Quartered coat of arms of Henry Clinton, 7th Earl of Lincoln, KG

Henry Clinton, 7th Earl of Lincoln, KG, PC (1684 – 7 September 1728) was the elder surviving son of Francis Clinton, 6th Earl of Lincoln and his second wife Susan Penyston (died 1720), younger daughter of Rev Anthony Penyston (son of Sir Thomas Penyston). He succeeded as Earl of Lincoln upon his father's death in 1693, taking his seat in the House of Lords in 1708.

As the brother-in-law of a prominent politician (Newcastle), he served in several offices of state during his lifetime. In 1719 he was one of the main subscribers in the Royal Academy of Music (1719), a corporation that produced baroque opera on stage. From 1715 to 1720, he served as Paymaster of the Forces. Three years later, he was appointed Lord Lieutenant of the Tower Hamlets and Constable of the Tower of London, a prestigious position. He was then elected as a bailiff of the Bedford Level Corporation in 1724, and appointed Lord Lieutenant of Cambridgeshire in 1728, serving until his death later that year.

In 1725, the refusal of Lord Pulteney to follow Walpole's instructions led to Pulteney's dismissal as Cofferer of the Household. Lord Lincoln was then appointed in his place as well as being sworn ex officio of the Privy Council and, following his father, was a Sword Bearer at the coronation of King George II in 1727.

== Family ==
On 16 May 1717, Lord Lincoln married the Hon. Lucy Pelham, a daughter of Thomas Pelham, 1st Baron Pelham, and they had two children:

- George Clinton, 8th Earl of Lincoln (1718–1730), previously styled by courtesy, Lord Fynes
- Henry Fiennes Pelham-Clinton, 2nd Duke of Newcastle and 9th Earl of Lincoln (1720–1794)

His sons George and Henry succeeded him in turn, the latter inheriting, by special remainder, the title of 2nd Duke of Newcastle (-under-Lyme) from his uncle Thomas Pelham-Holles, 1st Duke of Newcastle (both -on-Tyne and -under-Lyme).

A cousin was General Sir Henry Clinton of the American Revolutionary War.

== See also ==
- Earl of Lincoln
- Knight of the Garter

Political offices
Preceded by Robert Walpole	Paymaster of the Forces; 1715–1720	Succeeded by Robert Walpole
Preceded by William Pulteney	Cofferer of the Household; 1725–1728	Vacant Title next held by Horace Walpole
Honorary titles
Preceded by The Earl of Carlisle	Constable of the Tower of London; Lord Lieutenant of the Tower Hamlets; 1723–1725	Succeeded by The Duke of Bolton
Preceded by The Earl of Orford	Lord Lieutenant of Cambridgeshire; 1728	Succeeded by Henry Bromley
Peerage of England
Preceded by Francis Clinton	Earl of Lincoln; 1693–1728	Succeeded by George Clinton
