= Thomas Hay, 9th Earl of Kinnoull =

Scottish earl and British politician (1710–1787)

The Right Honourable The Earl of Kinnoull PC
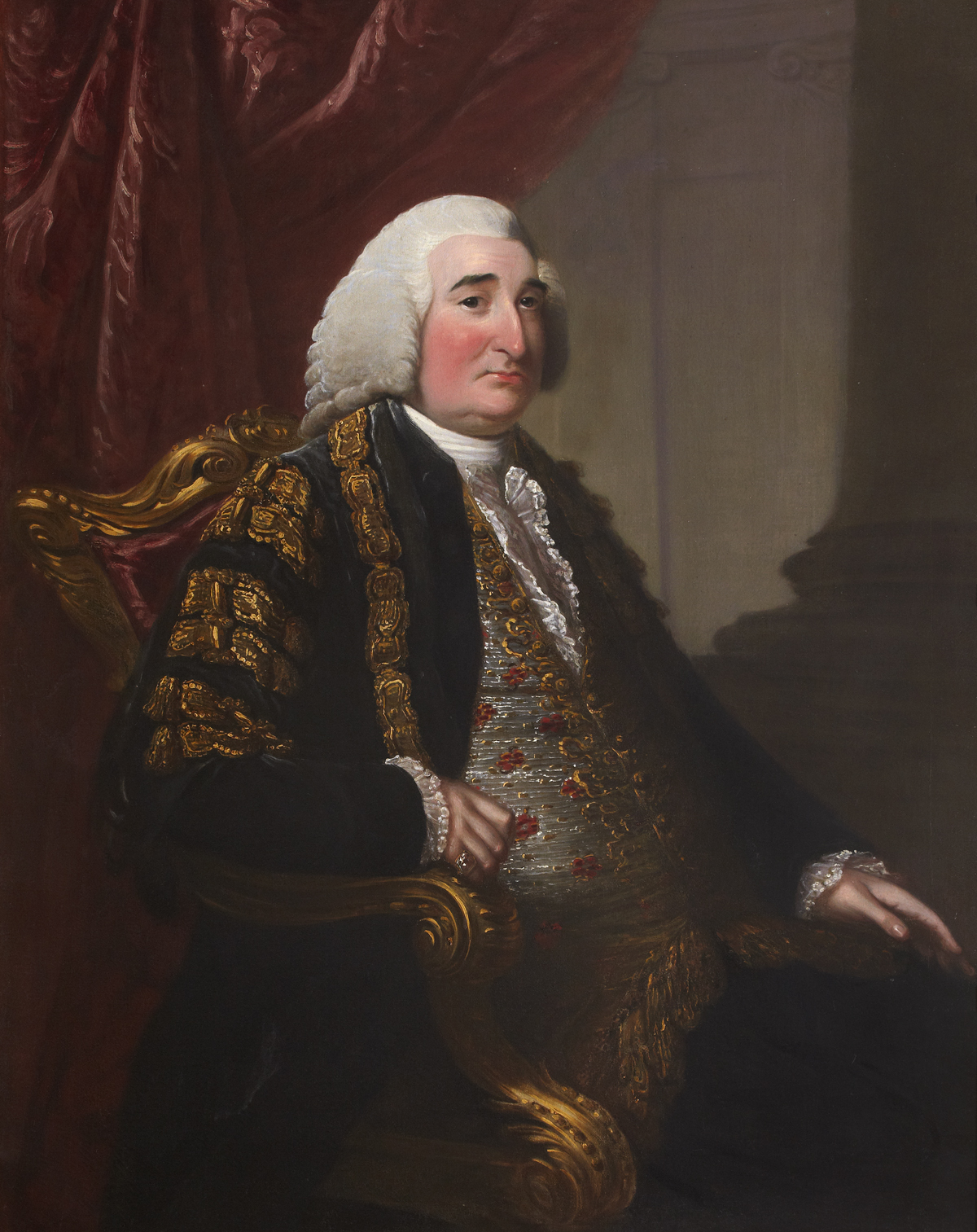
- Portrait by David Martin

Lord Commissioner of the Treasury
- In office 1754–1755

Member of Parliament for Cambridge
- In office 1741–1758
- Preceded by: Sir John Hynde Cotton, Bt
- Succeeded by: Soame Jenyns

Personal details
- Born: 4 July 1710
- Died: 27 December 1787 (aged 77)
- Spouse: Constantia Ernle (m. 1741; died 1753)
- Parents: George Hay, 8th Earl of Kinnoull; Abigail Harley

Thomas Hay, 9th Earl of Kinnoull, PC (4 July 1710 – 27 December 1787), styled Viscount Dupplin from 1719 to 1758, was a Scottish peer, British politician, and scholar.

== Family and education ==
Hay was the eldest son of George Hay, 8th Earl of Kinnoull, and Abigail, daughter of Robert Harley, 1st Earl of Oxford and Earl Mortimer.

He was educated at Westminster School and then at Christ Church, Oxford.

On 12 June 1741, at Oxford Chapel, Marylebone, he married Constantia Ernle, the only daughter and heiress of John Kyrle Ernle of Whetham House, near Calne, Wiltshire. Her great-grandfather was Sir John Ernle, who served as Chancellor of the Exchequer between 1676 and 1689.

They had a son, born 12 August 1742, who died 14 October 1743. She died in July 1753, and was buried in Calne. She had left her money to James Money, son of her first cousin, Elizabeth. A lengthy lawsuit followed between Kinnoull and Money.

He succeeded to the earldom upon his father's death on 28 July 1758.

== Career ==
As Viscount Dupplin, he was elected for Scarborough in 1736, but his election was overturned on petition. He sat as Member of Parliament (MP) for Cambridge from 1741 until 1758. As an MP, he gradually rose to a position of influence. In the final two parliaments, he served as chairman of the committee of privileges and elections. In 1741, he was appointed one of the commissioners of the revenue in Ireland, and in 1746 was made a lord of trade and plantations. In 1751, Horace Walpole described the earl as "fond of forms and trifles," but "not absolutely a bad speaker." He took a prominent part in the efforts to improve the condition of Nova Scotia. In 1754, Thomas Pelham-Holles, 1st Duke of Newcastle made him a Lord of the Treasury. He also served joint Paymaster of the Forces from 1755 until 1757.

He was well known in political and literary circles, and his friends included Philip Yorke, 1st Earl of Hardwicke, William Murray, 1st Earl of Mansfield, and the Archbishop of Canterbury Thomas Secker. He was also acquainted with Alexander Pope, who used him as a model for the character Balbus in his Epistle to Dr Arbuthnot.

He served as Chancellor of the Duchy of Lancaster from 1758 to 1762. In 1759, he served as special envoy to Portugal, returning the next year. After the Duke of Newcastle resigned his posts in 1762, Kinnoull told George III he would support whatever minister the King should name. However, when the William Cavendish, 4th Duke of Devonshire was dismissed, Kinnoull resigned his posts from his "inviolable friendship" to Devonshire.

He then retired to the country. His final post was as Chancellor of the University of St Andrews from 1765 to his death on 27 December 1787. He was buried in Aberdalgie.

The earldom passed to his nephew, Robert Hay-Drummond.

== Legacies ==
The 9th Earl built a modest castle near the highest point of Kinnoull Hill, its tower overlooking the Tay. It was inspired by castles he saw along the Rhine in Germany, during his Grand Tour. Jane Austen described Kinnoull Tower in Lesley Castle, a story she wrote in 1790, the year after she stayed there with D'Arcy Wentworth, during their ramble through Scotland :

I continue secluded from Mankind in our old and Mouldering Castle, which is situated two miles from Perth on a bold projecting rock, and commands an extensive view of the Town and its delightful Environs... You can form no idea sufficiently hideous, of its dungeon like form. It is actually perched on a Rock to appearance so totally inaccessible, that I expected to have been pulled up by a rope.

Today, Kinnoull Tower is more easily accessible, via a winding footpath through Kinnoull Hill Woodland Park. Another of the 9th Earl's lasting legacies is the Perth Bridge over the River Tay, "the Auld Brig" in the local Scots dialect, which he helped fund. Construction commenced in 1766 and was completed in 1771.

Duplin County, North Carolina, was named for Viscount Dupplin, as the 9th Earl was known when he served on the Board of Trade and Plantations in the 1740s. Lempster, New Hampshire, was briefly named Dupplin from 1753 to 1767.

Parliament of Great Britain
Preceded by Sir John Hynde Cotton, Bt; Gilbert Affleck	Member of Parliament for Cambridge; 1741–1758; With: James Martin 1741–1744; Christopher Jeaffreson 1744–1747, 1748–1749; Samuel Shepheard 1747–1748; Charles Sloane Cadogan 1749–1754, 1755–1758; Hon. Thomas Bromley 1754–1755	Succeeded by Charles Sloane Cadogan; Soame Jenyns
Political offices
Preceded by The Lord Edgcumbe	Chancellor of the Duchy of Lancaster; 1758–1762	Succeeded by James Stanley
Preceded by William Pitt the Elder	Jt Paymaster of the Forces; 1755–1757; With: The Earl of Darlington 1755–56; Thomas Potter 1756–57	Succeeded by Lord Holland
Academic offices
Preceded by The Duke of Cumberland	Chancellor of the University of St Andrews; 1765–1787	Succeeded by The Viscount Melville
Peerage of Scotland
Preceded by George Hay	Earl of Kinnoull; 1758–1787	Succeeded by Robert Hay-Drummond
