= Natoora =

Natoora Ltd
- Company type: Private
- Founder: Franco Fubini
- Headquarters: London, United Kingdom
- Area served: London, Paris, New York City, and Copenhagen

Natoora is a high-end greengrocer serving parts of the United Kingdom, the United States, France, and Denmark. Founded by Franco Fubini in 2004 as an online produce market for chefs and restaurants, Natoora expanded delivery operations to home cooks in 2020 during the COVID-19 pandemic via a mobile app. The company also operates a series of brick and mortar shops in London, Brooklyn, and Copenhagen. The company holds a Royal Warrant.

In 2021 Natoora launched a podcast titled "Transform the Food System", that has interviewed farmers and chefs including Magnus Nilsson, Dan Barber, and Alice Waters.
