= Granado Pigot =

English politician (c. 1650–1724)

Granado Pigot (c. 1650 – February 1724), of Bassingbourn, Cambridgeshire, was an English politician.

He was born the second son of John Pigot of Abington Pigotts, Cambridgeshire, and educated at Jesus College, Cambridge, where he graduated MA in 1669. He also studied law at Lincoln's Inn from 1668 and was called to the bar in 1677. He succeeded his father to property at Abington Pigotts and Litlington, Cambridgeshire in 1679.

He was a Member (MP) of the Parliament of England for Cambridge in 1690–1695 and for Cambridgeshire in 1702–1705. He served as High Sheriff of Cambridgeshire and Huntingdonshire for 1696.

He married twice; firstly Margaret, the daughter of Sir Robert Smyth, 1st Baronet of East Ham, Essex, with whom he had two surviving sons and one surviving daughter and secondly Alice, the daughter of Sir Brockett Spencer, 1st Baronet of Offley Place, Hertfordshire.

He died in February 1724 and was buried at Abington Pigotts. His younger surviving son, Thomas, became a fellow of Peterhouse, Cambridge.
