= Jennings Township =

Jennings Township may refer to:

== Indiana ==
- Jennings Township, Crawford County, Indiana
- Jennings Township, Fayette County, Indiana
- Jennings Township, Owen County, Indiana
- Jennings Township, Scott County, Indiana

== Kansas ==
- Jennings Township, Decatur County, Kansas

== Ohio ==
- Jennings Township, Putnam County, Ohio
- Jennings Township, Van Wert County, Ohio
