= Henry Pelham-Clinton, 2nd Duke of Newcastle =

British peer (1720-1794)

His Grace The Duke of Newcastle KG PC
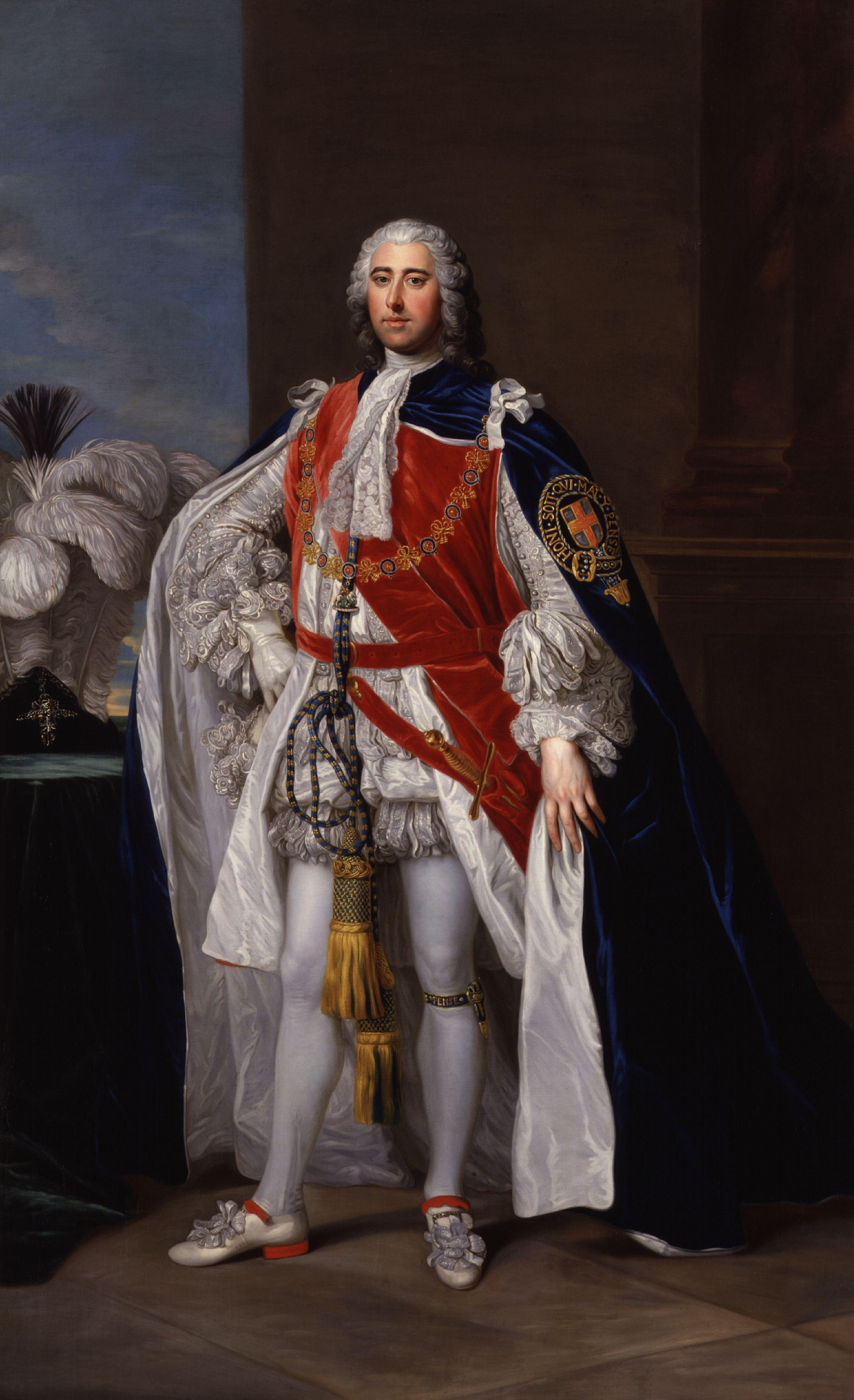
- The Duke of Newcastle in the robes of the Order of the Garter, by William Hoare, c. 1752-60

Lord Lieutenant of Nottinghamshire
- In office 28 December 1768 – 22 February 1794
- Preceded by: The Duke of Newcastle
- Succeeded by: The Duke of Newcastle

Personal details
- Born: Henry Fiennes Pelham-Clinton; 16 April 1720 London, England
- Died: 22 February 1794 (aged 73) Westminster, England
- Spouse: Catherine Pelham (m. 1744; died 1760)
- Children: Henry Pelham-Clinton, Earl of Lincoln; Thomas Pelham-Clinton, 3rd Duke of Newcastle
- Parent(s): Henry Clinton, 7th Earl of Lincoln; Lady Lucy Pelham

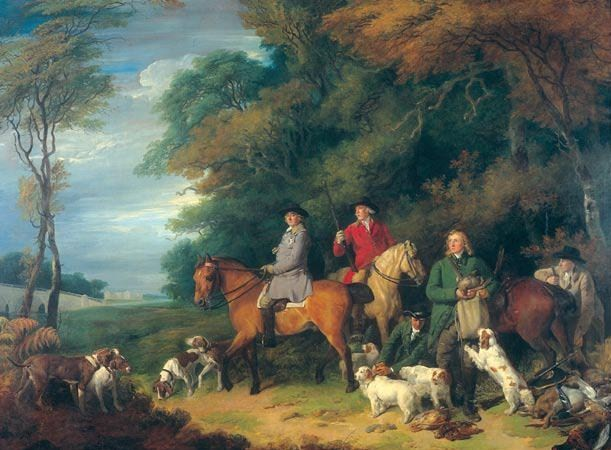
"The Return From Shooting" (1788) by Sir Francis Wheatley depicting The Duke of Newcastle, his friend Colonel Litchfield and the Duke's gamekeeper, Mansell along with four Clumber Spaniels.

Henry Fiennes Pelham-Clinton, 2nd Duke of Newcastle-under-Lyne, KG, PC (16 April 1720 – 22 February 1794) was born in London, the second son of the 7th Earl of Lincoln.

== Life ==
Henry's father died in 1728, and his brother, the 8th Earl of Lincoln, died in 1730, making Henry the 9th Earl of Lincoln. As he was still a minor, his guardian was his uncle, the 1st Duke of Newcastle-upon-Tyne. Newcastle was childless and soon regarded Lord Lincoln as his heir. Newcastle, and his brother Henry Pelham, were the two most powerful men in England, and both would serve as Prime Minister. Newcastle controlled political patronage of Parliament and the Crown, and so Lord Lincoln was showered with sinecure posts which brought him a large income. Chief among these sinecures was the lifetime appointment as Controller of Customs for the port of London.

On 16 October 1744, Lord Lincoln married his cousin Catherine Pelham (24 July 1727 – 27 July 1760), the daughter of his uncle Henry Pelham, who was at that time prime minister. An agreement was signed whereby Lord Lincoln became the heir of both his uncles, Henry Pelham and the Duke. Through his uncles, Lord Lincoln was also given a place at court, being made a gentleman of the King's Bedchamber. In 1752, he was made a Knight of the Garter. Lincoln was also "famous among the aristocracy for the length of his penis and the degree to which he used it with both women and men."

In 1756, his uncle, who was already Duke of Newcastle-upon-Tyne, requested from King George II to also be created Duke of Newcastle-under-Lyne with a special remainder to his nephew, Lord Lincoln. George II granted the request, and when the Duke died in 1768, Lord Lincoln became the 2nd Duke of Newcastle-under-Lyne.

The new duke steered clear of most politics, except in two instances. He had considerable influence because of the parliamentary seats he controlled. He used his influence to promote the career of his cousin Sir Henry Clinton, a career army officer. The Duke lobbied successfully for Sir Henry to be appointed commander-in-chief of the British forces in America during the American Revolution. The Duke's son, Thomas, was the aide-de-camp to Sir Henry Clinton. In 1768, the Duke was appointed to the Privy Council.

In December 1783, the Duke was asked by King George III to support the new ministry of William Pitt the Younger, who was facing difficulty in mustering support in parliament for his premiership. Henry ordered the six MPs under his control to support Pitt, helping Pitt gain enough votes in parliament to form a ministry.

The Duke died in 1794 aged 73 in Westminster.

== Legacy ==
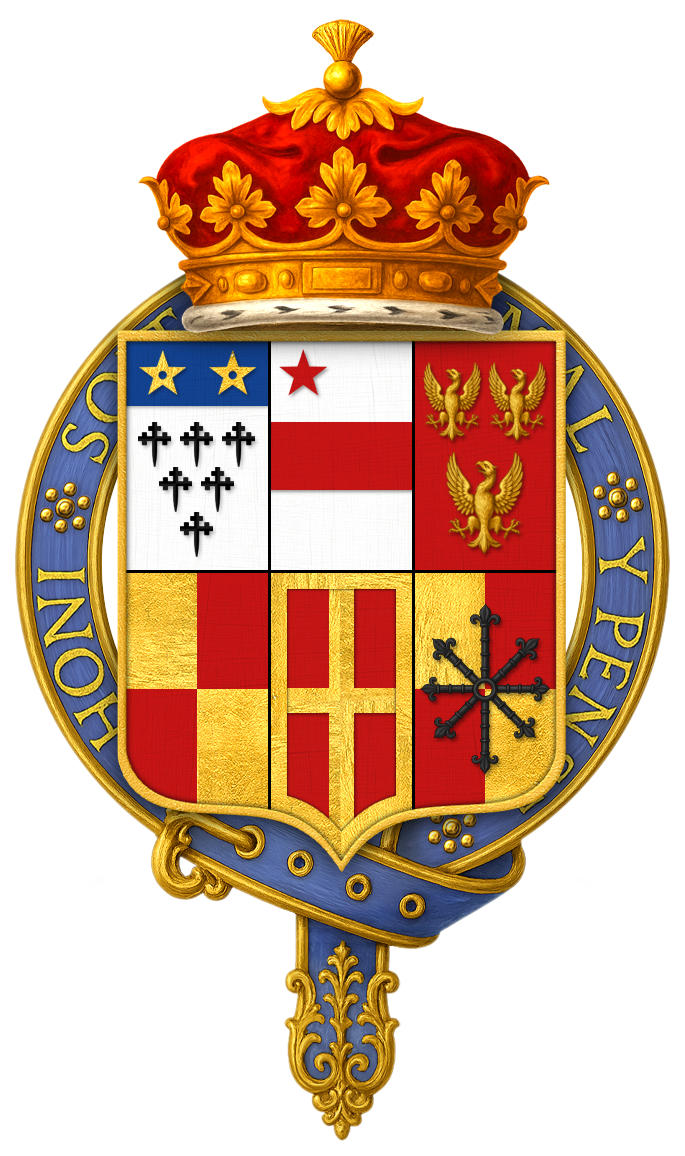
Coat of arms of Henry Fiennes Pelham-Clinton, 2nd Duke of Newcastle, KG, PC

The Duke is mainly known today as the creator of Clumber Park, his country seat in Nottinghamshire, and the dog breed the Clumber Spaniel, named after the estate. Clumber Park was begun in 1768 on the large estate the Duke had inherited from his uncle. Four thousand acres (16 square kilometres) of barren heath were landscaped into one of the most beautiful private parks in England, complete with a large man-made lake. The great mansion built there was demolished in 1938, but the park is today owned by the National Trust and is open to the public.

He had also been a Bailiff on the board of the Bedford Level Corporation Fenland reclamation scheme from 1742 to 1764.

The papers of the 2nd Duke are now held by Manuscripts and Special Collections at the University of Nottingham.

The town of Lincoln, New Hampshire is named for him.

== Family life ==
Before his wife's death at the age of 33, the Duke had four sons with her:

- George Pelham-Clinton, Lord Clinton (26 November 1745 – 19 August 1752)
- Henry Fiennes Pelham-Clinton, Earl of Lincoln (5 November 1750 – 18 October 1778), who married Lady Frances Seymour-Conway (4 December 1751 – 11 November 1820) on 21 May 1775 and had issue.
- Thomas Pelham-Clinton, 3rd Duke of Newcastle-under-Lyne (1 July 1752 – 18 May 1795), who married Lady Anna Maria Stanhope (31 March 1760 – 18 October 1834) on 2 May 1782 and had issue.
- Lord John Pelham-Clinton (died 1781)

He was said to have been a lover of Horace Walpole.

Political offices
Preceded by The Lord Bergavenny	Master of the Jewel Office; 1744–1745	Succeeded by Lord Glenorchy
Preceded by Edmund Waller	Cofferer of the Household; 1747–1754	Succeeded by Sir George Lyttelton, Bt
Preceded by The Earl of Orford	Auditor of the Exchequer; 1751–1794	Succeeded by The Lord Grenville
Honorary titles
Preceded by The Lord Montfort	Lord Lieutenant of Cambridgeshire; 1742–1757	Succeeded by Viscount Royston
Preceded by The Duke of Newcastle-upon-Tyne	Lord Lieutenant of Nottinghamshire; 1768–1794	Succeeded by The Duke of Newcastle-under-Lyne
Peerage of Great Britain
Preceded by Thomas Pelham-Holles	Duke of Newcastle-under-Lyne; 1768–1794	Succeeded by Thomas Pelham-Clinton
Peerage of England
Preceded by George Clinton	Earl of Lincoln; 1730–1794	Succeeded by Thomas Pelham-Clinton
