= John Bromley (the younger) =

English politician

John Bromley (c. 1682 – 20 October 1718), of Horseheath Hall, Cambridgeshire, was an English owner of land in England and Barbados, and a Tory politician who sat in the House of Commons from 1707 to 1718.

== Biography ==
Bromley was born in Barbados, the son of John Bromley and his wife Dorothy White, daughter of Thomas White of Fittleford, Dorset. (Note: Presumably Fiddleford) His father was a prosperous sugar planter of unknown origins who settled back in England. He was admitted at Clare College, Cambridge in 1700. He married Mercy Bromley, daughter of William Bromley on 10 August 1704. In 1704 his father "settled two estates and the enslaved people attached to them on his son John and the latter's new wife and kinswoman Mercy Bromley".

For the year 1704 to 1705, he served as High Sheriff of Cambridgeshire and Huntingdonshire. In 1707 he inherited estates in Cambridgeshire from his father.

== Parliament ==
Bromley was returned unopposed as Member of Parliament (MP) for Cambridgeshire in succession to his father at a by-election on 4 December 1707. He was returned unopposed in 1708 and voted consistently with the Tories. He was to some extent beholden to the local Whigs and after he voted against the impeachment of Henry Sacheverell in 1710, he faced a contest at the 1710 British general election, but nevertheless topped the poll. In Parliament, he showed himself as a staunch Tory, and was one of the ‘worthy patriots’ who exposed the mismanagements of the previous ministry. He was also a member of the October Club. At the 1713 general election he was returned unopposed. He was elected in a contest again in 1715 and sat until his death.

== Death ==
Bromley died of smallpox at Horseheath Hall, aged 36, on 20 October 1718 and was interred in a vault in All Saints church, Horseheath where there is a memorial tablet. He and his wife had one son, Henry, who became the 1st Baron Montfort. Mercy, his wife, died on 29 August 1705, as a result of giving birth to Henry (b. 20 August 1705).

Bromley and his wife were the beneficiaries of the "whole inheritance in Worcestershire" of Mercy's father. In his will Bromley specified that the Horseheath estate should be completed in accordance with his plans.

Parliament of Great Britain
Preceded by John Bromley; Sir Rushout Cullen, Bt	Member of Parliament for Cambridgeshire; 1707– 1718; With: Sir Rushout Cullen, Bt 1707-1710; John Jenyns 1710-1717; Robert Clarke 1717-1718	Succeeded by Francis Whichcote; Robert Clarke
