= Roger Jenyns =

English landowner (1663–1740)

Sir Roger Jenyns (1663–22 September 1740), of Bottisham, Cambridgeshire was an English knight and landowner.

He was the son of Roger Jenyns of Hayes, Middlesex (1636-1693) and his wife Sarah Latch (d 1703), daughter of Joseph Latch.

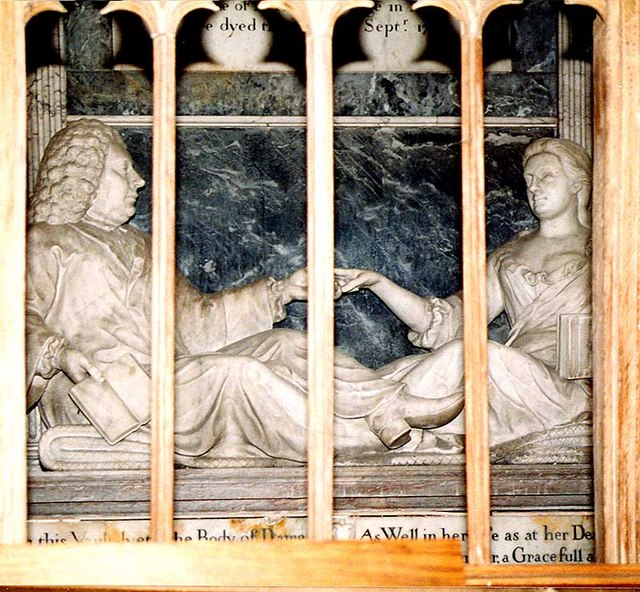
Effigy of Sir Roger and Elizabeth Soame in Bottisham church

He married Martha widow of John Mingay and they had three children – Roger, Veare, Sarah – who all died in infancy. After his wife's death in 1701, he married Elizabeth Soame, daughter of Sir Peter Soame, 2nd Bt. Their children were:

- Soame Jenyns (1704–1787), the MP and writer.
- Sarah Jenyns (1667–1670) died aged 3 years
- Thomas (1670–1696) unmarried
- Dorothy (?-?) married Thomas Biggs

He served as High Sheriff of Cambridgeshire and Huntingdonshire for 1701–02 and was knighted when he bought the Manor of Allington and Vaux, including Bottisham Hall. Jenyns also served as the Receiver & Expenditor General for the Bedford Level Corporation, the company which drained the Great Level of the Fens in the mid-seventeenth century. His brother, John Jenyns, succeeded their father as the surveyor general of the corporation.

He died in 1740 and was laid to rest in Holy Trinity church, Bottisham, where there is an elaborate lifesized monument of Sir Roger and his second wife in night attire, sculpted by Peter Scheemakers.
