= John Jenyns =

English Tory politician (d. 1717)

John Jenyns (c. 1660 – 1717), of Hayes and Bedford Row, St Andrew Holborn, Middlesex, was an English Tory politician who sat in the House of Commons from 1710 to 1717.

Jenyns was the eldest son of Roger Jenyns of Hayes and his wife Sarah Latch, daughter of Joseph Latch. He was admitted at Middle Temple in 1681. He married Jane Clitherow, the daughter of James Clitherow of Boston House by licence dated 16 February 1682. In 1687 he was admitted to Inner Temple. He succeeded his father to the manor of Hayes in 1693.

Jenyns was elected a conservator of the Fen Corporation at the age of 25. He succeeded his father as Surveyor General of the Fens in 1693, a post he then held for 20 years. He acquired an estate at Donnington, Isle of Ely, but in 1702 he was still serving on the bench and in the lieutenancy for Middlesex. He was High Sheriff of Cambridgeshire and Huntingdonshire for the year 1708 to 1709. At the 1710 general election, he was elected as a Tory Member of Parliament (MP) for Cambridgeshire. He was returned unopposed for Cambridgeshire at the 1713 general election. He voted against the French commercial treaty in 1713 and against the expulsion of Richard Steele in 1714. He was re-elected MP for Cambridgeshire at the 1715 general election. In 1716 he voted against the septennial bill.

Jenyns died on 1 February 1717 and was buried in the parish church at Hayes. He had three sons, none of whom went into parliament. He was the brother of Sir Roger Jenyns.

Parliament of Great Britain
Preceded by John Bromley; Sir Rushout Cullen, Bt	Member of Parliament for Cambridgeshire; 1710–1717; With: John Bromley	Succeeded by John Bromley; Robert Clarke
