= Charles Cadogan, 1st Earl Cadogan =

British peer and politician (1728–1807)

The Right Honourable The Earl Cadogan

Master of the Mint
- In office 1769–1784
- Preceded by: The Viscount Chetwynd
- Succeeded by: The Earl of Effingham

Member of Parliament for Cambridge
- In office 1755–1776 Serving with Viscount Dupplin, Soame Jenyns
- Preceded by: Viscount Dupplin; Thomas Bromley
- Succeeded by: Soame Jenyns; Benjamin Keene
- In office 1749–1754 Serving with Viscount Dupplin
- Preceded by: Viscount Dupplin; Christopher Jeaffreson
- Succeeded by: Viscount Dupplin; Thomas Bromley

Personal details
- Born: Charles Sloane Cadogan; 29 September 1728
- Died: 3 April 1807 (aged 78) Santon Downham, Suffolk
- Party: Whig
- Spouses: Frances Bromley (m. 1747; died 1768) Mary Churchill (m. 1777; div. 1796)
- Children: 14
- Parent(s): Charles Cadogan, 2nd Baron Cadogan; Elizabeth Sloane
- Relatives: Sir Hans Sloane (grandfather); Hans Stanley (cousin)
- Education: Magdalen College, Oxford

Charles Sloane Cadogan, 1st Earl Cadogan (29 September 1728 – 3 April 1807) was a British peer and Whig politician.

== Early life ==
Cadogan was the only son of Charles Cadogan, 2nd Baron Cadogan and his wife, the former Elizabeth Sloane.

His maternal grandparents were Elisabeth (née Langley) Sloane and Sir Hans Sloane, 1st Baronet. Following the 1780 suicide of his cousin, Ambassador Hans Stanley (son of his maternal aunt Sarah Sloane Stanley and George Stanley of Paultons), he inherited Stanley's half of the Sloane estate.

Cadogan matriculated at Magdalen College, Oxford in 1746.

== Career ==
From 1749 to 1754 and again from 1755, Cadogan was returned on the interest of his father-in-law, Lord Montfort, as a Member of Parliament for Cambridge until he inherited his father's title in 1776. He was also appointed Keeper of the Privy Purse to Prince Edward in 1756, Surveyor of the King's Gardens from 1764 to 1769 and Master of the Mint from 1769 to 1784. In 1800, he was elevated in the Peerage as 1st Viscount Chelsea and 1st Earl Cadogan.

In 1774, Cadogan entered into an agreement to loan £20,500 to Sir Robert Cockburn, Sir George Colebrooke, John Stewart and John Nelson to enable the four men to purchase a 320-acre estate in St George Parish, Grenada, together with the enslaved people on the estate.

In 1777 he leased 100 acres (0.40 km^{2}) of the family estate in Chelsea to architect Henry Holland for building development. Holland built Sloane Square, Sloane Street, Cadogan Place and Hans Place. Lord Cadogan also served as Sloane Trustee of the British Museum from 1779 until his death in 1807.

== Personal life ==
On 30 May 1747, Cadogan married Frances Bromley, a daughter of Henry Bromley, 1st Baron Montfort and the former Frances Wyndham (only daughter of Thomas Wyndham of Trent). Together, they had six sons:

- Charles Henry Sloane Cadogan, 2nd Earl Cadogan (1749–1832), an officer in the British Army who became insane before his father's death.
- William Bromley Cadogan (1751–1797), who married Jane Bradshaw in 1782.
- Thomas Cadogan (1752–1782), a naval officer lost at sea aboard HMS Glorieux.
- George Cadogan (1754–1780), who was killed in India while an officer in the HEIC Army.
- Edward Cadogan (1758–1779), an army officer.
- Henry William Cadogan (1761–1774), who died young.

Cadogan's first wife died in 1768, and on 10 May 1777, he married Mary Churchill, a daughter of Col. Charles Churchill and Lady Mary Walpole (a daughter of former Prime Minister Robert Walpole). Together, Mary and Charles were the parents of three sons and three daughters before they divorced in 1796:

- Lady Emily Mary Cadogan (ABT 1778-1839), who married Gerald Valerian Wellesley, a younger son of Garret Wesley, 1st Earl of Mornington and brother to Arthur Wellesley, 1st Duke of Wellington, and became the mother of George Wellesley.
- Henry Cadogan (1780–1813), who was killed at the Battle of Vitoria.
- Lady Charlotte Cadogan (1781–1853), who married Henry Wellesley, 1st Baron Cowley, also a son of the 1st Earl of Mornington, in 1803. After their divorce in 1810, she married Henry Paget, 1st Marquess of Anglesey, the eldest son of Henry Paget, 1st Earl of Uxbridge, also in 1810.
- George Cadogan, 3rd Earl Cadogan (1783–1864), who married Louisa Blake, sister of Joseph Blake, 1st Baron Wallscourt and fifth daughter of Joseph Blake of Ardfry.
- Lady Louisa Cadogan (1787–1843), who married the Rev. William Marsh in 1840.
- Lt. Colonel Edward Cadogan (1789–1851), who married Ellen Donovan, daughter of Laurence Donovan in 1823, and then, secondly, Jeanne Marie-Zoé Dipierrin in 1849 at Tarbes, France. He died at Château Ayzac.

Lord Cadogan died at Santon Downham, Suffolk, on 3 April 1807, and his titles passed to his eldest son by his first wife, Charles.

Parliament of Great Britain
Preceded by Viscount Dupplin; Christopher Jeaffreson	Member of Parliament for Cambridge; 1749–1754; With: Viscount Dupplin	Succeeded by Viscount Dupplin; Thomas Bromley
Preceded by Viscount Dupplin; Thomas Bromley	Member of Parliament for Cambridge; 1755–1776; With: Viscount Dupplin 1755–1758; Soame Jenyns 1758–1776	Succeeded by Soame Jenyns; Benjamin Keene
Political offices
Preceded by The Viscount Chetwynd	Master of the Mint; 1769–1784	Succeeded by The Earl of Effingham
Peerage of Great Britain
New creation	Earl Cadogan; 1800–1807	Succeeded by Charles Cadogan
Preceded by Charles Cadogan	Baron Cadogan; 1776–1807	Succeeded by Charles Cadogan
