= Soame Jenyns =

English writer (1704–1787)

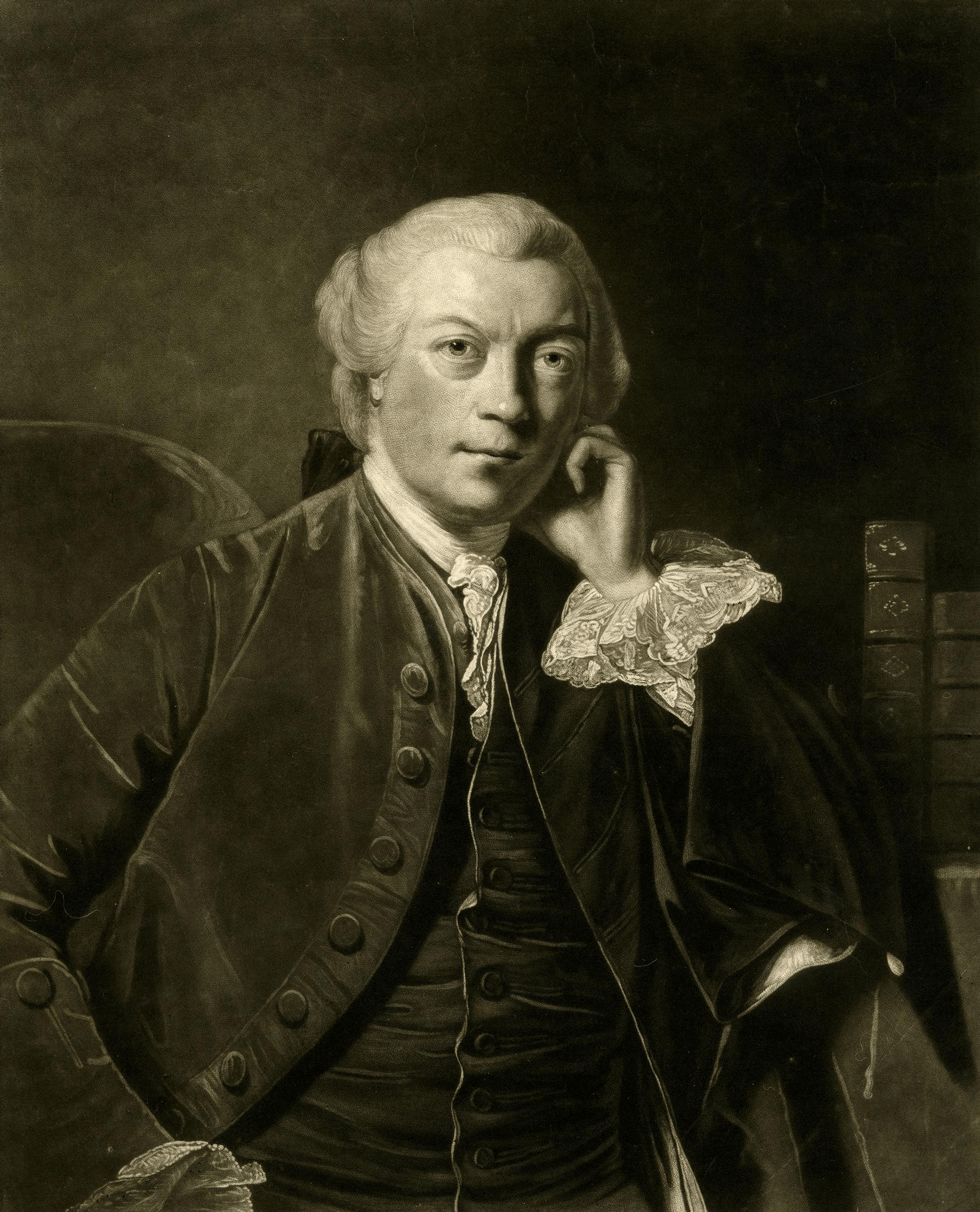
- Portrait from 1776
- Born: 1 January 1704; London, England
- Died: 18 December 1787 (aged 83); London, England
- Occupations: Writer, politician
- Spouses: Mary Soame (m. 1726; died 1753) Elizabeth Gray (m. 1754)
- Father: Roger Jenyns

Soame Jenyns (1 January 1704 – 18 December 1787) was an English writer and Member of Parliament. He was an early advocate of the ethical consideration of animals.

== Life and work ==
He was the eldest son of Sir Roger Jenyns and his second wife Elizabeth Soame, daughter of Sir Peter Soame. He was born in London, and was educated at St John's College, Cambridge. In 1742, he was chosen M.P. for Cambridgeshire, in which his property (Bottisham Hall, which he inherited from his father in 1740) was situated, and he afterwards sat for the borough of Dunwich and the town of Cambridge. From 1755 to 1780 he was one of the commissioners of the Board of Trade. He was elected as a Bailiff to the board of the Bedford Level Corporation for 1748–1769 and 1771–1787.

For the measure of literary repute which he enjoyed during his life Jenyns was indebted as much to his wealth and social standing as to his accomplishments and talents, though both were considerable. His poetical works, the Art of Dancing (1727) and Miscellanies (1770), contain many passages graceful and lively though occasionally verging on licence.

The first of his prose works was his Free Inquiry into the Nature and Origin of Evil (1756). This essay was severely criticized on its appearance, especially by Samuel Johnson in the Literary Magazine. Johnson condemned the book as a slight and shallow attempt to solve one of the most difficult of moral problems. Jenyns, a gentle and amiable man in the main, was extremely irritated by his review. He put forth a second edition of his work, prefaced by a vindication, and tried to take vengeance on Johnson after his death by a sarcastic epitaph:

Here lies poor Johnson. Reader, have a care,
Tread lightly, lest you rouse a sleeping bear;
Religious, moral, generous, and humane
He was—but self-sufficient, rude, and vain;
Ill-bred and over-bearing in dispute,
A scholar and a Christian—yet a brute.

In 1776 Jenyns published his View of the Internal Evidence of the Christian Religion. Though at one period of his life he had affected a kind of deistic scepticism, he had now returned to orthodoxy, and there seems no reason to doubt his sincerity, questioned at the time, in defending Christianity on the ground of its total agreement with the principles of human reason. The work was praised for its literary merits.

Jenyns published Disquisitions on Several Subjects in 1782. In "Disquisition II", Jenyns argued, using the great chain of being, that animals should be viewed in the same way that humans would want to be viewed by God. He also asserted that: "We are unable to give life, and therefore ought not wantonly to take it away from the meanest insect, without sufficient reason; they all receive it from the same benevolent hand as ourselves, and have therefore an equal right to enjoy it."

== Marriages ==
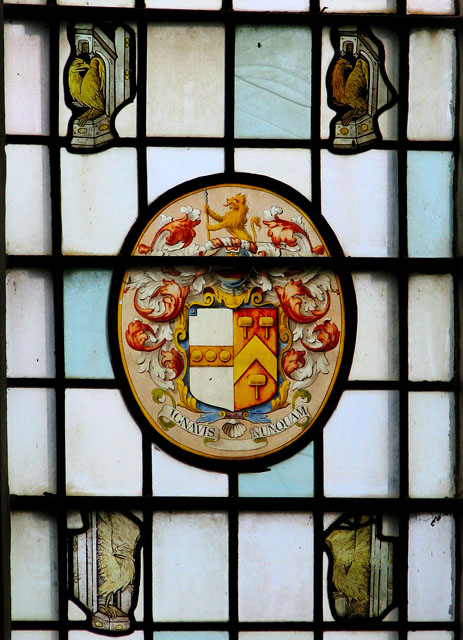
Arms of Soame Jenyns, St Andrew's Church, West Dereham, Norfolk. Jenyns (Argent, on a fess gules three bezants) impaling Soame (Gules, a chevron between three mallets or), for his first wife Mary Soame.

He married twice, but left no progeny:

- Firstly to Mary Soame, only daughter of Col. Edmund Soame (d. 1706) of Dereham, Norfolk, a Member of Parliament for Thetford in Norfolk from 1701 to 1705, who fought for King William III. His life-size alabaster statue survives in West Dereham Church.
- Secondly he married Elizabeth Grey, daughter of Henry Grey of Hackney, Middlesex.

== Death and succession ==
Jenyns died in London of a fever on 18 December 1787 and was buried at the church of the Holy Trinity, Bottisham. As he died without progeny, his heir was his cousin George Leonard Jenyns.

== Works ==
A collected edition of the works of Jenyns appeared in 1790, with a biography by Charles Nalson Cole. There are several references to him in James Boswell's Johnson.

== Commentary on Jenyns ==
Carl L. Becker describes Jenyns's take on the American Revolution in The Eve of the Revolution (1918) as follows:

Mr. Soame Jenyns, a writer of verse and member of the Board of Trade, who in a leisure hour had recently turned his versatile mind to the consideration of colonial rights with the happiest results. In twenty-three very small pages he had disposed of the "Objections to the Taxation of Our American Colonies" in a manner highly satisfactory to himself and doubtless also to the average reading Briton, who understood constitutional questions best when they were "briefly considered," and when they were humorously expounded in pamphlets that could be had for sixpence. ... The heart of the question was the proposition that there should be no taxation without representation; upon which principle it was necessary to observe only that many individuals in England, such as copyholders and leaseholders, and many communities, such as Manchester and Birmingham, were taxed in Parliament without being represented there. "... are they only Englishmen when they solicit protection, but not Englishmen when taxes are required to enable this country to protect them?" As for "liberty," the word had so many meanings, "having within a few years been used as a synonymous term for Blasphemy, Bawdy, Treason, Libels, Strong Beer, and Cyder," that Mr. Jenyns could not presume to say what it meant.

Jenyns has been cited as an example of an Anglican utilitarian.

Parliament of Great Britain
Preceded by Samuel Shepheard; Henry Bromley	Member for Cambridgeshire; 1741–1754; With: Samuel Shepheard 1741–1747; Viscount Royston 1747–1754	Succeeded by Viscount Royston; Marquess of Granby
Preceded by Miles Barne; Sir Jacob Downing, Bt	Member for Dunwich; 1754–1758; With: Sir Jacob Downing, Bt	Succeeded by Sir Jacob Downing, Bt; Alexander Forrester
Preceded by Viscount Dupplin; Hon. Charles Cadogan	Member for Cambridge; 1758–1780; With: Hon. Charles Cadogan 1758–1776; Benjamin Keene 1776–1780	Succeeded by Benjamin Keene; James Whorwood Adeane
