= Edmund Keene =

English churchman and academic (1714–1781)

The Right Reverend Edmund Keene
- Bishop of Ely
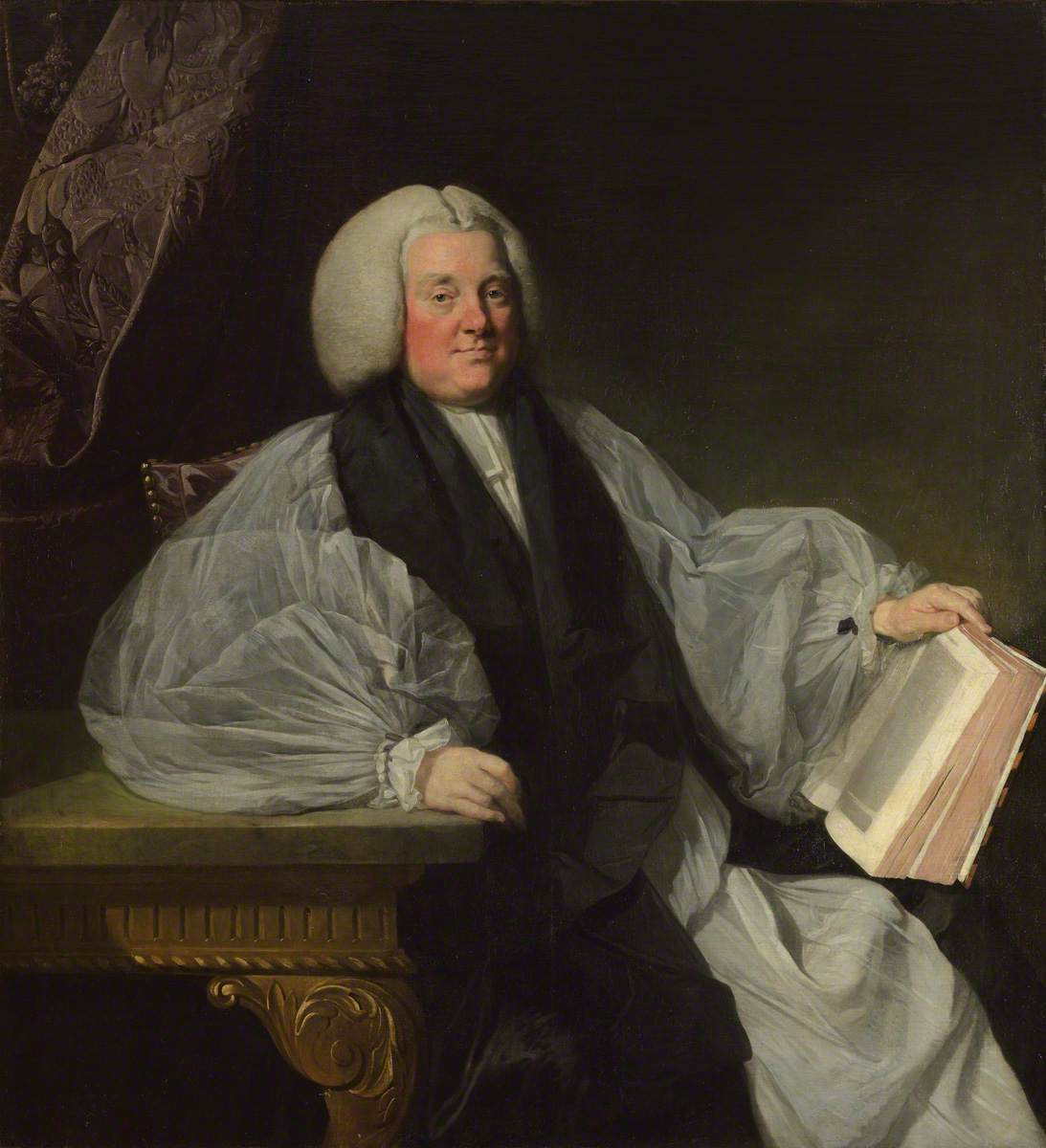
- Bishop Keene, by Johan Zoffany, 1768
- Diocese: Diocese of Ely
- In office: 22 January 1771 – 6 July 1781 (death)
- Predecessor: Matthias Mawson
- Successor: James Yorke
- Other posts: Bishop of Chester (1752–1771); Vice-chancellor, University of Cambridge (1749–1750)

Personal details
- Born: 1714 King's Lynn, Norfolk
- Died: 6 July 1781 (aged 67) Ely Place, London
- Buried: Bishop West's Chapel, Ely Cathedral
- Denomination: Church of England
- Residence: Ely Palace, London
- Parents: Charles Keene (1674–?); Susan Rolfe (? – 1753)
- Spouse: Mary Andrewes (1725–1776)
- Children: Benjamin Keene (1753–1837)
- Profession: Clergy
- Education: Charterhouse
- Alma mater: Gonville and Caius College, Cambridge

Edmund Keene (1714 – 6 July 1781) was an English churchman and academic, who was Master of Peterhouse, Cambridge and later served first as Bishop of Chester, then Bishop of Ely.

Younger brother of the diplomat Benjamin Keene, the family were close friends of Sir Robert Walpole, British Prime Minister from 1721 to 1742. This connection helped him secure a series of lucrative positions in his early career but it was his relationship with Walpole's successor Thomas Pelham-Holles, 1st Duke of Newcastle that proved most beneficial.

With Newcastle's support, he was appointed Vice-chancellor of the University of Cambridge in 1749, carrying out a number of reforms. In 1752, he became Bishop of Chester, then Bishop of Ely in 1771, his 'great object, the aim and end of his ambition'.

== Biographical details ==
Edmund Keene was born in King's Lynn, Norfolk in 1714, second surviving son of Charles Keene (1675–?) and Susan Rolfe (?–1753). His older brother Benjamin (1697–1757) was a distinguished diplomat and long-serving Ambassador to Spain.

Both his father and uncle Benjamin served as Mayor of King's Lynn, as did his grandfather Edmund Rolfe (1640–1726). In addition, Rolfe was election agent for Sir Robert Walpole, British Prime Minister from 1721 to 1742; this connection helped the careers of both Benjamin and Edmund.

In May 1752, he married Mary Andrewes (1725–1776), only child of a wealthy London merchant. They had a daughter and a son, Benjamin, MP for Cambridge from 1775 to 1784.

== Career ==
Through the influence of Sir Robert Walpole, friend of the family, he was educated at Charterhouse School, and was admitted to Gonville and Caius College, Cambridge, in 1730. He graduated B.A. in January 1734, and M.A. in 1737, having been incorporated at Oxford on 14 July 1735. From Michaelmas 1730 to Lady day 1734 he was scholar of Caius, and from Michaelmas 1736 to the same date in 1739 he was one of its junior fellows. In August 1739 he became a fellow of Peterhouse, Cambridge, and on 31 December 1748 was promoted to be Master of Peterhouse.

For the two academic years ending November 1751 he was a reforming vice-chancellor of the university; a code of orders and regulations, proposed to the university senate on 11 May 1750, subsequently became law, and provoked an Occasional Letter to Dr. Keene, and other pamphlets. Having been ordained deacon on 18 July 1736, he held from 1740 to 1770 the rectory of Stanhope in County Durham. He made improvements to the house and gardens, and enlarged. On 22 March 1752 he was consecrated in the chapel of Ely House as bishop of Chester, but he did not resign the mastership of his college until 1754. While at Chester he rebuilt the episcopal palace; George Grenville, in December 1764, proposed that he should accept a transfer to the archiepiscopal see of Armagh, but Keene held out for the diocese of Ely.

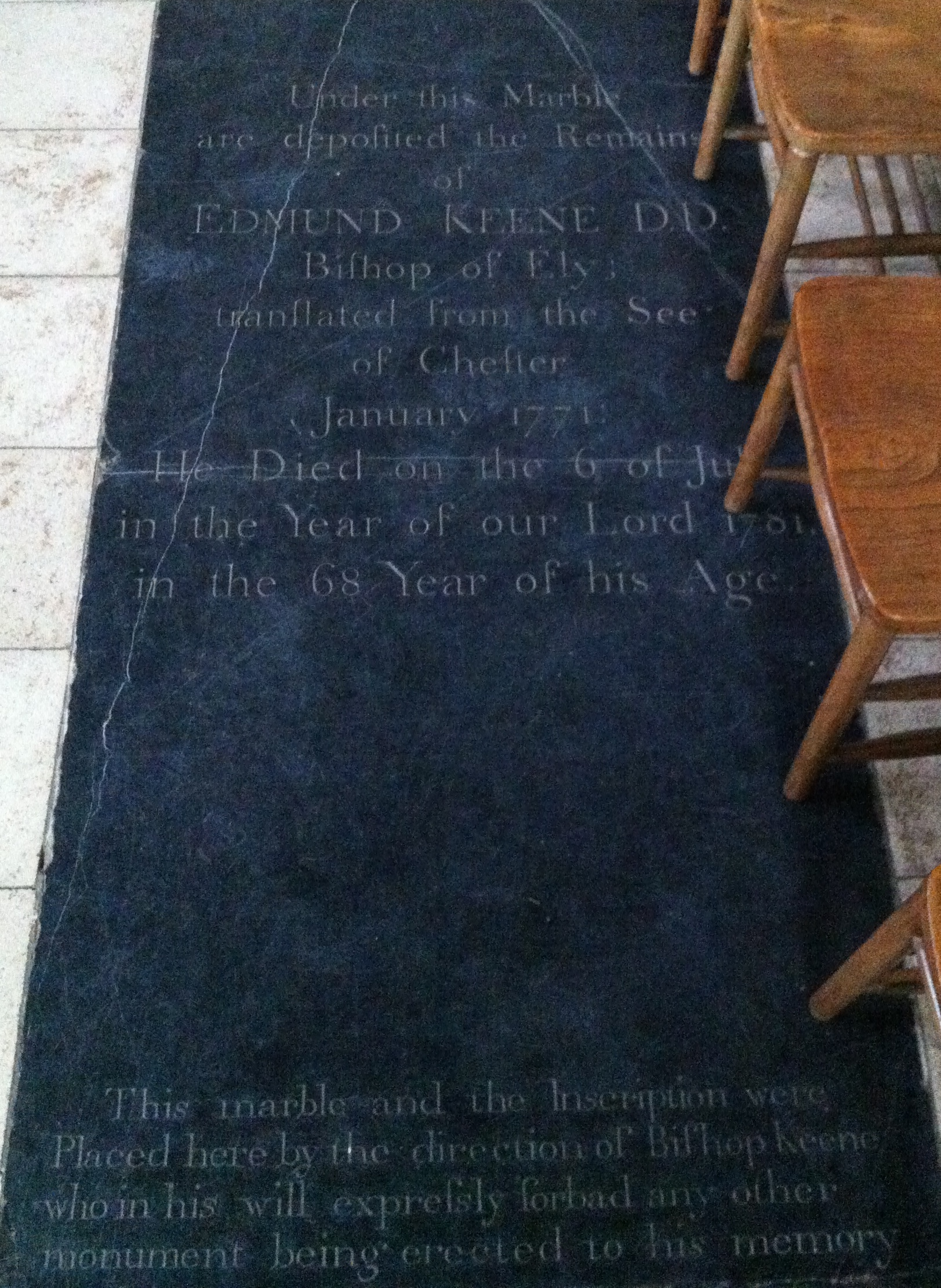
Memorial to Bishop Edmund Keene in Ely Cathedral

On 22 January 1771 he was confirmed as bishop of Ely. He obtained in 1772 an act of parliament for alienating from the see the ancient bishop's palace in Holborn, and for purchasing the freehold of a house in Dover Street, Piccadilly, London; the house on that site was built by him about 1776. He also rebuilt most of the palace at Ely, and furnished a gallery of portraits of its bishops from the Reformation. Many of Keene's appointments to livings did him credit, and where there was no resident incumbent he reserved to himself the right of appointing to the curacies, but he did not escape hostile criticism, and the epigrams of Thomas Gray were especially severe. He died at Ely House, Dover Street, London, on 6 July 1781 and at his own desire was buried in West's Chapel, Ely Cathedral, with a short epitaph written by himself.

== Works ==
Keene was select preacher at Whitehall Chapel in 1738, and published five sermons. He was the author of a translation of the first book of Theocritus, 'by a Gentleman,' which is inserted in John Whalley's Poems (1745), pp. 133–49. The original edition of Bentham's Ely was dedicated to him, and to it was prefixed a plate of his arms.

== Sources ==
- Drummond, Mary (1964). KEENE, Benjamin (1753-1837), of Westoe Lodge, Cambs in The History of Parliament: the House of Commons 1754-1790. Boydell & Brewer.
- Ewing, William Creasey (1837). Norfolk lists, from the Reformation to the present time. Matchett, Stevenson, Matchett.
- Hole, Robert (2007). "Keene, Edmund". Oxford Dictionary of National Biography (online ed.). Oxford University Press. doi:10.1093/ref:odnb/15247. (Subscription, Wikipedia Library access or UK public library membership required.)
- Mercer, M (2004). "Keene, Sir Benjamin". Oxford Dictionary of National Biography (online ed.). Oxford University Press. doi:10.1093/ref:odnb/15245. (Subscription, Wikipedia Library access or UK public library membership required.)

Academic offices
Preceded by John Whalley	Master of Peterhouse, Cambridge; 1748–1754	Succeeded by Edmund Law
Church of England titles
Preceded by Samuel Peploe	Bishop of Chester; 1752–1771	Succeeded by William Markham
Preceded by Matthias Mawson	Bishop of Ely; 1771–1781	Succeeded by James Yorke
