= Jennings Creek =

Stream in Ohio, U.S.

Coordinates: 40°53′56″N 84°18′04″W

Jennings Creek is a stream in the U.S. state of Ohio. The 14.5-mile (23.3 km) long stream is a tributary of the Auglaize River.

== History ==
Jennings Creek was named for Colonel Jennings, a pioneer settler (the village of Fort Jennings, Ohio in Putnam County also bears his name).

== See also ==
- List of rivers of Ohio
