= Bread Ahead =

British bakery chain

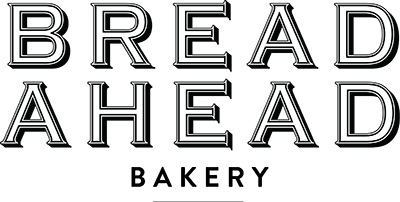
- Type: Private limited company
- Industry: Bakery
- Founded: 13 September 2012
- Headquarters: London, England
- Number of locations: 7 (2022)
- Key people: Matthew Jones, founder
- Products: bread, doughnuts, sandwiches, soups, and cakes
- Website: breadahead.com

Bread Ahead is a chain of bakeries that also provide baking classes in London, United Kingdom. It was founded in 2013 by Matthew Jones in London's Borough Market. It has specialised in doughnuts, using British sourced ingredients from traders in Borough Market and Chelmsford in Essex. It also sells sourdough breads, cakes, pizza, coffees and pastries.

== Locations ==
As of June 2023, there are seven outlets in London, one in Saudi Arabia and one in Dubai. During the months between September 2021 and February 2022 Bread Ahead had a temporary residency at the Southwark Cathedral Cafe.

Year	Location	Status
2013	Borough Market	Open
2023	Bromley	Open
2016	Pavilion Road	Closed
2019	Wembley	Open
2022	South Kensington	Open
2023	The Tea House	Open
2022	Jeddah, Saudi Arabia	Open
2022	Dubai, UAE	Open
2023	Riyadh, Saudi Arabia	Open
2024	Battersea Power Station	Open
2025	Philippines	Upcoming

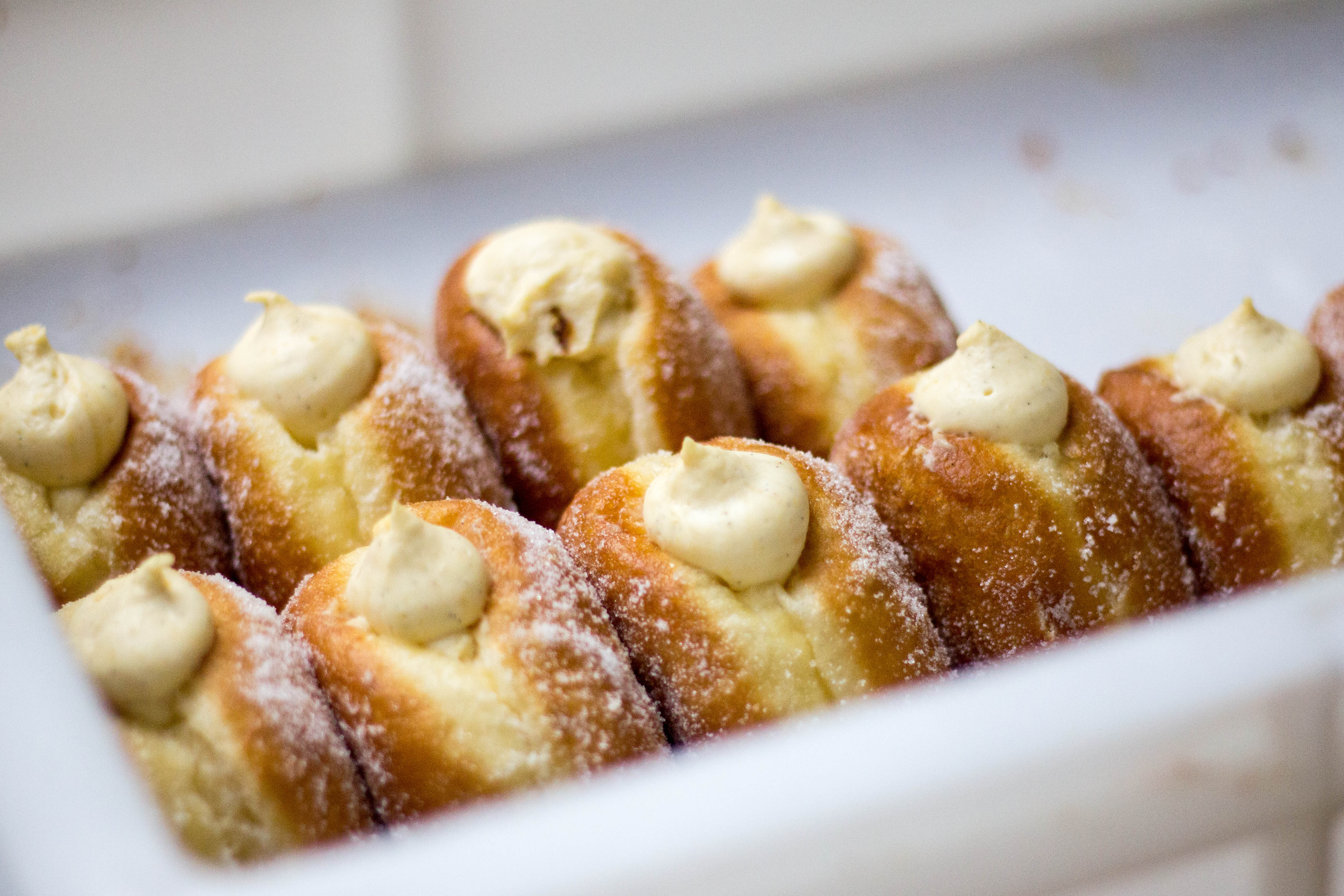
Bread Ahead Vanilla Doughnuts

== Baking school ==
In 2014, Bread Ahead set up a bakery school to teach customers. During the lockdown in 2019/20 they moved the baking classes online. The live baking workshops ran every day at 2pm on their Instagram account, where viewers could tune in for a live baking lesson.

== Matthew Jones ==
Matthew Jones founded Bread Ahead Bakery and Baking School, after having spent 15 years working in Michelin-starred restaurants.

In 2017 Jones published Baking School: The Bread Ahead Cookbook, and in 2021 Jones published the book Bread Ahead: The Expert Home Baker: A Masterclass in Classic Baking.
