= John Bromley (the elder) =

English plantation owner and politician (c. 1652–1707)

John Bromley (c. 1652–7 October 1707), of White River, Saint Philip, Barbados, and Horseheath Hall, Cambridgeshire, was a plantation owner and English politician.

== Life ==
He was of obscure origin but had moved to Barbados. He was a member of the Assembly in Montserrat in 1678 and in Barbados itself from 1685 to 1690, where he was elected speaker in 1689–90. In 1688 William Fortescue sold 205 acres and the 86 enslaved people on it to John Bromley. Bromley was a member of the Barbados council from June 1690 to 1693 and from 1696 to after 1698. In 1704 he "settled two estates and the enslaved people attached to them on his son John and the latter's new wife and kinswoman Mercy Bromley".

Around that time he returned to England and established himself in Cambridgeshire by buying the Horseheath estate, thereafter living the typical life of an English squire, including acting as a Deputy-Lieutenant of Cambridgeshire.

== UK Parliament ==
He was a Member (MP) of the Parliament of England for Cambridgeshire 1705 to October 1707.

== Death ==
He died on 7 October 1707 and was interred in a vault in All Saints church, Horseheath where there is a memorial tablet. He had married Dorothy (d. 14 July 1709), "daughter of Thomas White of Fittleford, Dorset". (Note: Presumably Fiddleford) They had 2 sons, the eldest of which, John, inherited Horseheath and his father's parliamentary seat.
