= Knapton (surname) =

Knapton is a surname and may refer to:

- Gabriel Knapton (born 1989), American gridiron football player
- George Knapton (1698–1778), English portrait painter
- John Knapton (politician) (fl.1406–1433), English politician
- John Knapton (engineer) (born 1949), English engineer and academic
- Philip Knapton (1788–1833), English organist and composer
- Thomas Knapton (c.1816–1833), English mariner executed for rape
