= John Knapton =

John Knapton may refer to:

- John Knapton (engineer)
- John Knapton (politician)
