= Edward Finch (British Army officer) =

English army officer and politician

General The Honourable Edward Finch
- Born: 26 April 1756
- Died: 27 October 1843 (aged 87)
- Military career
- Allegiance: United Kingdom
- Branch: British Army
- Service years: 1778–1843
- Rank: General
- Conflicts: American Revolutionary War; French Revolutionary Wars; Flanders Campaign; Battle of Caesar's Camp; Battle of Famars; Battle of Lincelles; Battle of Hondschoote; Battle of Tourcoing; Battle of Tournay; Irish Rebellion of 1798; Anglo-Russian invasion of Holland; Battle of Bergen; Egyptian Campaign; Siege of Alexandria; Napoleonic Wars; Battle of Copenhagen

General Edward Finch (26 April 1756 – 27 October 1843) was a British Army general and a member of parliament.

== Military career ==
Edward Finch was the fifth son of Heneage Finch, 3rd Earl of Aylesford and entered Westminster School in 1768 and Trinity College, Cambridge in 1773. He was awarded a B.A. in 1777.

He joined the British Army as a cornet in the 11th Dragoons in 1778, soon transferring to the 20th Light Dragoons, and the following year was promoted lieutenant into the 87th Regiment of Foot. He served in the West Indies and North America before being promoted a captain in the Coldstream Guards in 1783.

In May 1789 he was elected MP for Cambridge, a seat he held continuously until 1819.

In 1792 he was promoted captain and lieutenant-colonel and went with the Guards Brigade as part of the 1793 Flanders Campaign under General Lake. He was present at the actions of Caesar's Camp, Famars, and Lincelles, and at the battles of Hondschoote, Lannoy, Turcoing, and Tournay, remaining with his corps throughout the campaign. He was promoted colonel in 1796.

He was present with the Guards during the Irish Rebellion of the Irish Rebellion of 1798, and commanded the 1st Battalion, Coldstream Guards in the Anglo-Russian invasion of Holland of 1799 and at the defeat at Bergen in September of that year.

In 1800 he was in Egypt in command of a brigade of cavalry and was promoted major-general on New Year's Day, 1801. In 1804 he was appointed a Groom of the Bedchamber to the King. In 1809 he took a brigade of Guards to Denmark, taking an active role in the bombardment of Copenhagen but did not see active service after that time.

In 1808 he was appointed Regimental Colonel of the 54th Regiment of Foot, transferred in 1809 to the 22nd Foot, and on 12 August 1819 was promoted full general.

He died unmarried in 1843.

Parliament of Great Britain
Preceded by James Whorwood Adeane; Francis Dickins	Member of Parliament for Cambridge; 1789–1800; With: Francis Dickins 1789–1791; Robert Manners 1791–1800	Succeeded by Parliament of the United Kingdom
Parliament of the United Kingdom
Preceded by Parliament of Great Britain	Member of Parliament for Cambridge; 1801–1819; With: Robert Manners 1801–1819	Succeeded by Robert Manners; Frederick Trench
Military offices
Preceded by Sir James Craig	Colonel of the 22nd (the Cheshire) Regiment of Foot; 1809–1843	Succeeded by Sir Charles Napier
Preceded by Oliver Nicolls	Colonel of the 54th (West Norfolk) Regiment of Foot; 1808–1809	Succeeded by Lord Forbes
