= Thomas Capel =

Thomas Capel may refer to:

- Thomas Bladen Capel (1776–1853), British Royal Navy officer
- Thomas John Capel (1836–1911), Roman Catholic priest
- Tommy Capel (1922–2009), English professional footballer
- Thomas Edward Capel (1770–1855), English soldier and sportsman
