= Richard Maisterman =

English politician

Richard Maisterman (fl. 1363–1391) was an English politician. He sat as MP for Cambridge in 1381, May 1382, October 1382, February 1383, October 1383, November 1384, 1385, and January 1390 and Mayor of Cambridge from September 1381 till 1386 and 1388 till 1390.

He also served as tax collector in Cambridgeshire in December 1380 and commissioner of goal delivery in Cambridge in April 1383 and commissioner of arrest in April 1387.

He married a woman named Sarah.
