= Simon Bentbow =

English politician

Simon Bentbow (died c. 1427) was an English politician. He sat as MP for Cambridge in September 1397, and 1407 and Mayor of Cambridge from 1413 till 1414.

He also served as tax collector of Cambridgeshire in March 1393, and Cambridge in October 1393; bailiff of Cambridge from September 1394 till 1395, 1402 till 1404; justice of the peace for Cambridge from 8 February 1414 till April 1415, 12 December 1420 till November 1423.
