= John Bush (English politician) =

Member of the Parliament of England

John Bush (fl. 1411 – 1426), of Cambridge, was an English politician.

He was a Member (MP) of the Parliament of England for Cambridge in 1411 and 1426.
