= John Beverley (politician) =

15th-century English politician

John Beverley (fl. 1414), of Cambridge, was an English politician.

He was a Member (MP) of the Parliament of England for Cambridge in April 1414.
