= John Alderhithe =

English politician

John Alderhithe (fl. 1396–1446) was an English politician. He sat as MP for Cambridge in 1411.

He also served as bailiff of Cambridge from September 1406 till 1407, 1409 till 1410, 1413 till 1414, 1420 till 1421 and 1422 till 1423.
