= Robert Manners (British Army officer, born 1758) =

British soldier and Member of Parliament

General Robert Manners
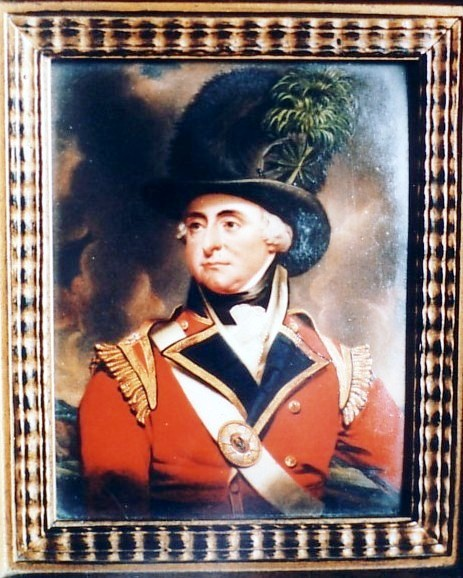
- Portrait of Manners in the uniform of the light company of the 3rd (Scots) Regiment of Foot Guards by Henry Pierce Bone
- Born: 2 January 1758
- Died: 9 June 1823 (aged 65)
- Military career
- Allegiance: Great Britain
- Branch: British Army
- Rank: General
- Other work: Member of Parliament

General Robert Manners (2 January 1758 – 9 June 1823) was a British Army officer and Member of Parliament.

== Life ==
He was the eldest son of General Lord Robert Manners by his wife Mary Digges and succeeded to his father's estate at Bloxholm in Lincolnshire. He was educated at Caen Academy and took the Grand Tour.

Manners joined the Army as a cornet in the 3rd Dragoon Guards on 27 April 1775, and was promoted to lieutenant on 25 December 1778. On 3 October 1779, he became captain of a company in the 86th Foot, newly raised by his cousin, the Duke of Rutland. He went with the 86th Foot to the West Indies, serving on marine duty aboard a ship before being sent with a detachment to Tobago. In 1781 the island was captured by the Comte de Grasse, and the garrison returned to Europe, the officers giving their parole. On 6 December 1782, Manners was promoted to major in the 80th Foot, and on 19 March 1783, he was made an equerry to the King. On 14 February 1784, he succeeded Allan Maclean as lieutenant-colonel of the 1st Battalion, 84th Regiment of Foot. That regiment was reduced on 24 June 1784, and after a period on half-pay, Manners joined the 3rd Foot Guards as captain-lieutenant on 19 February 1787.

In the general election of 1784, he was elected to Parliament for Great Bedwyn through the influence of Lord Ailesbury, the expenses of the election (£2,500, or the equivalent of £322,000 today) being paid by George Rose out of Government secret funds. He was considered as a replacement for Sir Henry Peyton, MP for Cambridgeshire, on that gentleman's death in 1789, but unsuccessfully stood at Northampton in the general election in 1790. He returned to Parliament in a by-election for Cambridge on 12 February 1791.

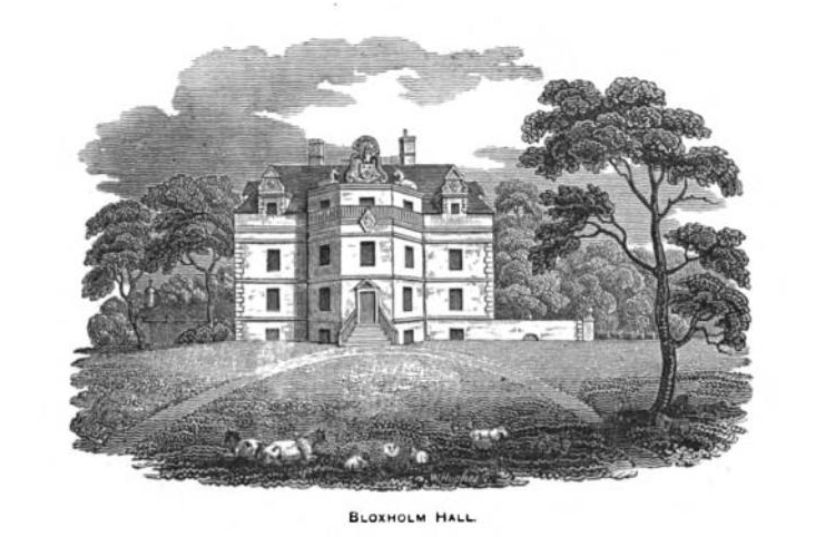
Bloxholm Hall, home of General Robert Manners

In 1791 Manners was promoted to captain of his own company in the 3rd Foot Guards and served with the 1st Battalion of the regiment in the first Flanders campaign. He was granted the brevet rank of Colonel on 1 March 1794. In the second campaign in Flanders, he was appointed to the light company, which was formed into a battalion with the four grenadier companies. He commanded the four light infantry companies at the Battle of Tourcoing on 17 May 1794, where he was wounded at the storming of Mouvaux. He was at every subsequent action of the Guards Brigade during the campaign except Boxtel, when he was detached on a month's hospital duty. He was promoted second major in the 3rd Foot Guards on 1 April 1795, and major-general in the Army on 3 May 1796, when he was placed on the staff of the Eastern District. He then commanded the 9th Brigade during the expedition to Holland in 1799.

One of the battalions in his brigade was the 2nd Battalion, 9th Regiment of Foot, of which Manners had been appointed colonel-commandant in August 1799. He was then given the colonelcy of the 30th (Cambridgeshire) Regiment of Foot on 7 November 1799, and on returning from Holland he received command of a brigade at Norwich. The brigade moved to Bagshot camp before embarking at Southampton to participate in the Ferrol expedition in August 1800. After the failure of the expedition, the troops continued to Gibraltar with Sir Ralph Abercromby, while Manners returned to Britain with Sir James Pulteney, who joined the staff of the Southern District. On 6 January 1801, he was made Chief Equerry and Clerk Marshal to the King. When war broke out again in 1803, Manners was appointed to the staff of the Eastern District, holding that post until he was promoted to lieutenant-general on 25 September that year. After the establishment of the Regency, he was appointed Clerk Marshal in the King's Household at Windsor on 19 February 1812, and was promoted to full general on 4 June 1813. He retired from Parliament at the 1820 general election.

General Manners continued as Colonel of the 30th Foot until he died in 1823. He was unmarried but left children by Mary Ann Mansel (1780–1854). His elder sister Mary married William Hamilton Nisbet and was the mother of Mary Nisbet, first wife of Thomas Bruce, 7th Earl of Elgin.

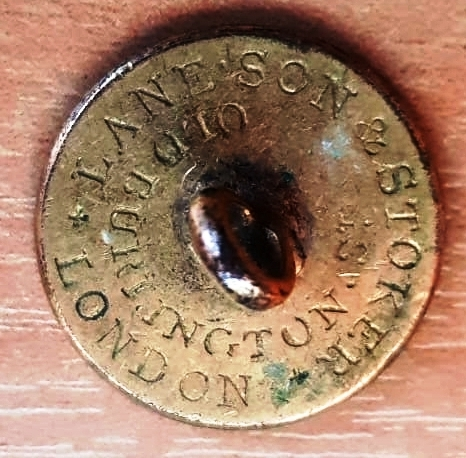
A button from General Manners's frock coat (Imprint: Lane, Son & Stoker, London)

Manners died on 9 June 1823 at his house in Curzon Street and was buried, with his parents, at the church of St. Mary the Virgin at Bloxholm; the chancel and porch had been erected by Manners in 1812.

Manners left Bloxholm to his brother George, High Sheriff of Lincolnshire, in 1826, whose death occurred in 1828. Both brothers had died unmarried, so George left the estate to their dearest cousin, Mrs Jenney. She was the daughter of John, second Duke of Rutland, and sister of Lord Robert Manners, the father of Robert and George, making her their first cousin, once removed. However, Lady Mary Bruce (her husband being Robert Nisbet-Hamilton, who changed his surname from Christopher), who was the brothers’ great niece and eldest daughter of the 7th Earl of Elgin, contested the will, saying George had changed his will in her favour, and took the matter to court. A relative of the brothers wrote to the Editor of the Stamford Mercury on 26 March 1841 making it very clear that the family knew George wanted Bloxholm to go to Mrs Jenney, writing: for it is the opinion of all who are acquainted with the circumstances, that the testator would never have altered had he been in the full possession of his faculties. The matter was settled in favour of Lady Mary Bruce.

Parliament of Great Britain
Preceded by Sir Merrik Burrell; Paul Cobb Methuen	Member of Parliament for Great Bedwyn; 1784–1790; With: Marquess of Graham	Succeeded by Marquess of Graham; Lord Doune
Preceded by Francis Dickins; Edward Finch	Member of Parliament for Cambridge; 1791–1800; With: Edward Finch	Succeeded by Parliament of the United Kingdom
Parliament of the United Kingdom
Preceded by Parliament of Great Britain	Member of Parliament for Cambridge; 1801–1820; With: Edward Finch 1801–1819; Frederick Trench 1819–1820	Succeeded by Frederick Trench; Charles Madryll Cheere
