= Groom of the Chamber =

Position in the monarch's household

Groom of the Chamber was a position in the Household of the monarch in early modern England. Other Ancien Régime royal establishments in Europe had comparable officers, often with similar titles. In France, the Duchy of Burgundy, and in England while French was still the language of the court, the title was varlet or valet de chambre. In German, Danish and Russian the term was "Kammerjunker" and in Swedish the similar "Kammarjunkare".

In England after the Restoration, appointments in the King's Household included Groom of the Great Chamber, Groom of the Privy Chamber and Groom of the Bedchamber. The first two positions were appointed by Lord Chamberlain's warrant; the third, of greater importance, was a Crown appointment.

== Medieval and early-modern England ==
Traditionally, the English Court was organized into three branches or departments:

1. the Household, primarily concerned with fiscal more than domestic matters, the "royal purse";
2. the Chamber, concerned with the Presence Chamber, the Privy chamber, and other more public rooms of the royal palaces, as the Bedchamber was concerned with the innermost;
3. the Bedchamber, focused on the most direct and intimate aspects of the lives of the royal family, with its own offices, like the Groom of the Body and the Squire of the Body.

The Chamber organization was controlled by the Lord Chamberlain; if he was the general of a small army of servitors, the Grooms of the Chamber were his junior officers, with ushers and footmen the footsoldiers. The Grooms wore the royal livery (in earlier periods), served as general attendants, and fulfilled a wide range of specific functions. (One Groom of the Chamber had the job of handing the "King's Stuff" to a Squire of the Body, who would then dress the King.) Grooms ranked below Gentlemen of the Chamber, usually important noblemen, but above Yeomen of the Chamber. They were mostly well-born, on a first rung of a courtier's career. The office of Groom of the Chamber could also be bestowed in a more honorific manner, upon people who served the royal household in some less direct way; the early Tudor poet Stephen Hawes became a Groom of the Chamber in 1502, under Henry VII.

Under James I, the Bedchamber was established as a semi-autonomous department (overseen by the Groom of the Stole) with its own hierarchy of Gentlemen, Grooms and Yeomen, which usurped those of the Privy Chamber in terms of their influence with and closeness to the King. (The old Bedchamber office of Esquire to the Body was finally abolished in 1702).

Grooms Extraordinary

In the reigns of the early monarchs of the House of Stuart, James I and Charles I, the actors of the King's Men, the playing company under royal patronage, were officially "Grooms extraordinary of the Chamber". They did not usually fulfill the normal functions of the office; rather, they served the King by performing plays for him. Although on busy occasions, the King's Men appear to have acted as more ordinary servants: in August 1604 they were "waiting and attending" upon the Spanish ambassador at Somerset House, "on his Majesty's service" — but no plays were performed. They were also turned out to bulk up the Household for grand ceremonial occasions. A similar arrangement held for some of Queen Anne's Men, including their playwright Thomas Heywood; they became Grooms of the Queen's Chamber, under the Queen's Chamberlain. On some occasions, Shakespeare, Heywood, and their compatriots wore the royal livery, marched in processions, and played other roles in the ceremonial life of the monarchy. (Grooms could not be arrested for debt without the permission of the Lord Chamberlain — a big advantage for sometimes-struggling actors.) In at least two cases, those of George Bryan (Lord Chamberlain's Men) and John Singer (Queen Elizabeth's Men; Admiral's Men), professional actors became "normal" Grooms of the Chamber, with the normal duties, after retiring from the stage.

=== List of Grooms of the Chamber ===
- Stephen Hawes, 1502–?
- William Carey (courtier), 1520-1527
- William Sharington, 1542–1544
- Thomas Streete, c.1547(-1553?)
- John Fowler, 1548
- William Goring, 1553
- George Brediman or Bridgeman, c.1553-1580

Elizabeth I (1558–1603)

- Thomas Astley, 1558-1595
- John Baptist Castilion, 1558-1597
- Thomas Commander, 1558-1559
- Henry Seckford, 1558-1610
- Thomas Lichfield, 1559-1586
- John Tamworth, 1559–1569
- Edward Cary, 1562-1618
- Henry Middlemore, 1566-1593
- Thomas Knyvett, 1570-1622
- Thomas Gorges, 1571-1610
- William Killigrew, 1578-1622
- Edward Darcy, 1579-1612
- Edward Denny, 1582-1600
- Michael Stanhope, c.1583–1603
- Ferdinando Richardson (alias Heyborne), 1586-1618

James I (1603–1625)

- Sir John Holles, 1603–1610
- Sir Henry Bromley, 1603–>1609
- Humphrey May, 1604–1611
- Sir Thomas Gerard, 1st Baronet, 1603–1621
- William Woodhouse, 1603–1625
- Henry Goodyer, 1603–1626
- Sir Oliver Cromwell, 1603–1636
- Sir Robert Mansell, by 1604–>1615
- Sir Walter Cope, by 1607–1614
- Sir John Kay, by 1608–>1615
- Sir William Uvedale, by 1612–>1618
- Sir John Eyre, by 1612–>1632
- George Chaworth, 1st Viscount Chaworth, 1621–?
- John Maynard, by 1621–>1641

Queen Anne of Denmark

- Samuel Daniel
- John Florio, by 1604 - 1619
- Matthew Hairstanes

Charles I (1625–1649)

- Abraham van Dort, 1625–1640
- John Trevor, 1625–? (died 1630)
- Sir William Walter, 1633–1646

=== List of Grooms of the Bedchamber ===
James I (1603–1625)

- John Murray, (1603-1622)

Charles I (1625–1649)

- George Kirke, 1625–1646
- William Murray, 1625->1643
- William Legge, 1645–1647

Commonwealth (1649–1660)

No Grooms of the Bedchamber appointed

== Post-Restoration England and Great Britain ==
Fourteen Grooms of the Great Chamber were appointed under Charles II (later reduced to ten); they served as internal court messengers and were in attendance in the guard room.

The Grooms of the Privy Chamber were six in number (reduced to two under James I); initially responsible for manning the doors to the Privy Chamber, by 1720 the office largely lost its function, but attendance was still required for Coronations and other 'extraordinary Occasions'.

There were usually a dozen or so Grooms of the Bedchamber appointed (though under different monarchs the number varied from as many as fifteen or as few as eight), two of whom were on duty at any one time. They served for a week at a time in rotation and were responsible for attending the King in the Chamber when he dressed, and at Dinner when he dined privately (taking food and wine from the servants to give it to the Lords, who would serve The King). They would also deputise for the Lords of the Bedchamber if required to do so. Grooms of the Bedchamber were close to the King and were occasionally sent overseas as special envoys to negotiate royal marriages and such. During the exile of James II a court was maintained by that king in France and certain of his grooms joined him there. Similarly, during the last years of the reign of King George III, when he withdrew from public life in consequence of his poor mental health, several of his grooms followed him to Windsor Castle, whilst others remained in London to serve the Prince Regent, later to become King George IV. When the Monarch was a Queen, the positions of Groom of the Bedchamber were not filled (though Prince Albert, consort to Queen Victoria, did appoint his own Grooms of the Bedchamber).

=== List of Grooms of the Privy Chamber ===
Charles II (1660–1685)

Date						
6 June 1660	Maurice Wynn	James Elliott	Robert Thompson			
7 June 1660	Maurice Wynn	James Elliott	Robert Thompson	Adam Hill		
10 June 1660	Maurice Wynn	James Elliott	Robert Thompson	Adam Hill	Adrian May	
12 June 1660	Maurice Wynn	James Elliott	Robert Thompson	Adam Hill	Adrian May	James Progers
17 May 1661	Maurice Wynn	James Elliott	Robert Thompson	Roger Burgess	Adrian May	James Progers
27 January 1669	Maurice Wynn	James Elliott	Robert Thompson	Thomas Ross	Adrian May	James Progers
30 April 1670	Maurice Wynn	James Elliott	Robert Thompson	Thomas Ross	Arthur Ingram	James Progers
15 May 1671	Maurice Wynn	James Elliott	Robert Thompson	Thomas Ross	Arthur Ingram	Thomas Cooke
15 May 1672	Maurice Wynn	James Elliott	Robert Thompson	Thomas Ross	Paul French	Thomas Cooke
17 May 1673	Maurice Wynn	James Elliott	Robert Thompson	Thomas Ross	Paul French	John Lowther
25 June 1673	Maurice Wynn	James Elliott	Robert Thompson	Christopher Jeffreys	Paul French	John Lowther
8 July 1676	Maurice Wynn	James Elliott	Robert Thompson	Christopher Jeffreys	John Bellingham	John Lowther
18 December 1676	Maurice Wynn	James Elliott	Robert Thompson	Christopher Jeffreys	John Bellingham	Humphrey Graves
11 October 1677	Maurice Wynn	Richard Binns	Robert Thompson	Christopher Jeffreys	John Bellingham	Humphrey Graves
20 May 1678	Maurice Wynn	Yelverton Peyton	Robert Thompson	Christopher Jeffreys	John Bellingham	Humphrey Graves
23 October 1680	Edward Lloyd	Yelverton Peyton	Robert Thompson	Christopher Jeffreys	John Bellingham	Humphrey Graves
20 August 1683	Edward Lloyd	John Radcliffe	Robert Thompson	Christopher Jeffreys	John Bellingham	Humphrey Graves

James II 1685–1688

Date		
February 1685	Robert Thompson	Christopher Jeffreys

William III 1689–1702

Date				
February 1689	Robert Thompson	Christopher Jeffreys		
28 March 1689	Robert Thompson	Christopher Jeffreys	Thomas Duppa	Humphrey Graves
12 January 1694	David Carbonell	Christopher Jeffreys	Thomas Duppa	Humphrey Graves
29 July 1695	David Carbonell	William Wallis	Thomas Duppa	Humphrey Graves
30 November 1695	William Whitmore	William Wallis	Thomas Duppa	Humphrey Graves
22 December 1699	William Whitmore	William Wallis	Thomas Duppa	Robert Barkham
19 May 1700	William Whitmore	Robert Wallis	Thomas Duppa	Robert Barkham
25 October 1701	William Whitmore	Cornelius Tilburgh	Thomas Duppa	Robert Barkham

1702–1901

Date				
9 July 1702	John Bonning	Robert Hemmington		
26 March 1711	John Bonning	Robert Hemmington	Cornelius Tilburgh	
28 May 1715	Joseph Ashley	Robert Hemmington	Cornelius Tilburgh	
3 February 1719	James Trymmer	Robert Hemmington	Cornelius Tilburgh	
12 August 1719	James Trymmer	Robert Hemmington	Cornelius Tilburgh	Edward Parsons
25 November 1720	James Trymmer	Robert Hemmington	Cornelius Tilburgh	John Parsons
10 December 1728	James Trymmer	Langham Edwards	Cornelius Tilburgh	John Parsons
11 May 1729	James Trymmer	Wentworth Odiarne	Cornelius Tilburgh	John Parsons
2 June 1740	James Trymmer	Wentworth Odiarne	Charles Collins	John Parsons
7 June 1745	James Trymmer	Wentworth Odiarne	Charles Collins	Edward Capell
24 February 1750	James Trymmer	Wentworth Odiarne	Charles Husband Collins	Edward Capell
3 June 1762	James Trymmer	Strelley Pegge	Charles Husband Collins	Edward Capell
8 October 1762	Samuel Pegge	Strelley Pegge	Charles Husband Collins	Edward Capell
5 July 1774	Samuel Pegge	Strelley Pegge	John Larpent	Edward Capell
6 July 1774	Samuel Pegge	Thomas Collins	John Larpent	Edward Capell
24 October 1778	Samuel Pegge	Thomas Collins	William Fordyce	Edward Capell
24 February 1781	Samuel Pegge	Thomas Collins	William Fordyce	James Trail
18 November 1781	Samuel Pegge	James Hawkins	William Fordyce	James Trail
7 March 1785	Samuel Pegge	James Hawkins	Hale Young Wortham	James Trail
March 1788	Samuel Pegge	James Hawkins	Richard Byron	James Trail
5 February 1794	Samuel Pegge	James Hawkins	Edmund Armstrong	James Trail
19 October 1797	Samuel Pegge	James Hawkins	Robert Chester	James Trail
29 July 1798	Samuel Pegge	James Hawkins	James Meller	James Trail
1799	Samuel Pegge	James Whitshed	James Meller	James Trail
23 May 1800	John Hunter	James Whitshed	James Meller	James Trail
18 May 1802	John Hunter	William Chapman Fowle	James Meller	James Trail
19 August 1808	John Hunter	William Chapman Fowle	James Meller	Frederick Chapman
3 June 1812	William Fenton Scott	William Chapman Fowle	James Meller	Frederick Chapman
6 July 1814	Robert Powell	William Chapman Fowle	James Meller	Frederick Chapman
12 August 1818	Robert Powell	William Chapman Fowle	William Beresford	Frederick Chapman
12 December 1823	Robert Powell	William Chapman Fowle	William Beresford	Charles Dashwood
21 April 1832	Robert Powell	William Chapman Fowle	William Beresford	Courtenay Edmund William Boyle
23 April 1833	Thomas Shiffner	William Chapman Fowle	William Beresford	Courtenay Edmund William Boyle
6 May 1836	Arthur Johnstone Blackwood	William Chapman Fowle	William Beresford	Courtenay Edmund William Boyle
1 November 1839	Arthur Johnstone Blackwood	Stewart Henry Paget	William Beresford	Courtenay Edmund William Boyle
24 February 1840	Arthur Johnstone Blackwood	Thomas Noel Harris	William Beresford	Courtenay Edmund William Boyle
1 March 1852	Arthur Johnstone Blackwood	Thomas Noel Harris	Mortimer Sackville-West	Courtenay Edmund William Boyle
13 July 1852	Arthur Johnstone Blackwood	Thomas Noel Harris	Samuel Randall	Courtenay Edmund William Boyle
16 February 1859	Arthur Johnstone Blackwood	Thomas Noel Harris	Samuel Randall	John Home Purves
31 March 1860	Arthur Johnstone Blackwood	John Francis Campbell, of Islay	Samuel Randall	John Home Purves
2 October 1862	Arthur Johnstone Blackwood	John Francis Campbell, of Islay	Edward Stopford Claremont	John Home Purves
3 July 1867	Arthur Johnstone Blackwood	John Francis Campbell, of Islay	Edward Stopford Claremont	Roden Berkeley Wriothesley Noel
14 January 1871	Arthur Johnstone Blackwood	John Francis Campbell, of Islay	Edward Stopford Claremont	Charles George Cornwallis Eliot
8 January 1874	James Bontein	John Francis Campbell, of Islay	Edward Stopford Claremont	Charles George Cornwallis Eliot
16 February 1874	James Bontein	Nathaniel George Philips	Edward Stopford Claremont	Charles George Cornwallis Eliot
24 October 1884	Arnold Royle	Nathaniel George Philips	Edward Stopford Claremont	Charles George Cornwallis Eliot
25 July 1890	Arnold Royle	Nathaniel George Philips	Malcolm Drummond, of Megginch	Charles George Cornwallis Eliot
1 October 1893	Arnold Royle	Nathaniel George Philips	Otway Frederick Seymour Cuffe	Charles George Cornwallis Eliot
14 November 1899	Arnold Royle	Nathaniel George Philips	Otway Frederick Seymour Cuffe	Sir Francis Knollys

=== List of Grooms of the Bedchamber ===
Charles II (1660–1685)

Date of appointment												
1 Feb 1661	John Ashburnham	Daniel O'Neill	Henry Seymour									
2 Feb 1661	John Ashburnham	Daniel O'Neill	Henry Seymour	Thomas Elliot	Thomas Killigrew	Richard Lane	Robert Phillips	Silius Titus	David Walter			
3 Feb 1661	John Ashburnham	Daniel O'Neill	Henry Seymour	Thomas Elliot	Thomas Killigrew	Richard Lane	Robert Phillips	Silius Titus	David Walter	Edward Proger		
6 Feb 1661	John Ashburnham	Daniel O'Neill	Henry Seymour	Thomas Elliot	Thomas Killigrew	Richard Lane	Robert Phillips	Silius Titus	David Walter	Edward Proger	William Legge	
1 Jan 1662	John Ashburnham	Daniel O'Neill	Henry Seymour	Thomas Elliot	Thomas Killigrew	Richard Lane	Robert Phillips	Silius Titus	David Walter	Edward Proger	William Legge	Henry Coventry
28 Oct 1664	John Ashburnham	James Hamilton	Henry Seymour	Thomas Elliot	Thomas Killigrew	Richard Lane	Robert Phillips	Silius Titus	David Walter	Edward Proger	William Legge	Henry Coventry
1 Oct 1670	John Ashburnham	James Hamilton	Henry Seymour	Thomas Elliot	Thomas Killigrew	Richard Lane	Robert Phillips	Silius Titus	David Walter	Edward Proger	Sidney Godolphin	Henry Coventry
16 Jun 1671	Thomas Felton	James Hamilton	Henry Seymour	Thomas Elliot	Thomas Killigrew	Richard Lane	Robert Phillips	Silius Titus	David Walter	Edward Proger	Sidney Godolphin	Henry Coventry
21 Jun 1672	Thomas Felton	James Hamilton	Henry Seymour	Thomas Elliot	Thomas Killigrew	Richard Lane	Robert Phillips	Silius Titus	David Walter	Edward Proger	Sidney Godolphin	Bernard Granville
7 Jun 1673	Thomas Felton	Henry Savile	Henry Seymour	Thomas Elliot	Thomas Killigrew	Richard Lane	Robert Phillips	Silius Titus	David Walter	Edward Proger	Sidney Godolphin	Bernard Granville
8 Jul 1675	Thomas Felton	Henry Savile	Henry Seymour	Thomas Elliot	Thomas Killigrew	Richard Lane	Robert Phillips	Henry Guy	David Walter	Edward Proger	Sidney Godolphin	Bernard Granville
Aug 1677	Thomas Felton	Henry Savile	Henry Seymour	George Porter	Thomas Killigrew	Richard Lane	Robert Phillips	Henry Guy	David Walter	Edward Proger	Sidney Godolphin	Bernard Granville
18 Jul 1678	Thomas Felton	Henry Savile	Henry Seymour	George Porter	Thomas Killigrew	Richard Lane	Robert Phillips	Henry Guy	David Walter	Edward Proger	George Rodney Bridges	Bernard Granville
Apr 1679	Thomas Felton	Henry Savile	Henry Seymour	George Porter	Thomas Killigrew	Richard Lane	Robert Phillips	Henry Guy	Thomas Wyndham	Edward Proger	George Rodney Bridges	Bernard Granville
16 May 1679	Thomas Lee	Henry Savile	Henry Seymour	George Porter	Thomas Killigrew	Richard Lane	Robert Phillips	Henry Guy	Thomas Wyndham	Edward Proger	George Rodney Bridges	Bernard Granville
26 Nov 1679	Thomas Lee	Henry Savile	Henry Seymour	George Porter	Thomas Killigrew	Richard Lane	Robert Phillips	Thomas Neale	Thomas Wyndham	Edward Proger	George Rodney Bridges	Bernard Granville
Mar 1683	Thomas Lee	Henry Savile	Henry Seymour	George Porter	Bevil Skelton	Richard Lane	Robert Phillips	Thomas Neale	Thomas Wyndham	Edward Proger	George Rodney Bridges	Bernard Granville
15 May 1683	Thomas Lee	Francis Gwyn	Henry Seymour	George Porter	Bevil Skelton	Richard Lane	Robert Phillips	Thomas Neale	Thomas Wyndham	Edward Proger	George Rodney Bridges	Bernard Granville
19 Dec 1683	Thomas Lee	Francis Gwyn	Henry Seymour	Henry Killigrew	Bevil Skelton	Richard Lane	Robert Phillips	Thomas Neale	Thomas Wyndham	Edward Proger	George Rodney Bridges	Bernard Granville

James II (1685–1688)

Date of appointment								
2 May 1685	James Fortrey	Oliver Nicholas	Henry Slingsby	Heneage Finch	Richard Leveson	James Griffin	Francis Russell	David Lloyd
1686	James Fortrey	Oliver Nicholas	Henry Slingsby	Heneage Finch	Richard Leveson	James Griffin	James Porter	David Lloyd
9 Mar 1687	James Fortrey	Oliver Nicholas	Henry Slingsby	Heneage Finch	Richard Leveson	James Griffin	Richard Bagot	David Lloyd

William III (1689–1702)

Date of appointment									
6 Jun 1689	Percy Kirke	Hatton Compton	Charles Trelawny	Emanuel Howe	John Sayers	Adrian van Borselen	James Stanley		
Mar 1690	Percy Kirke	Hatton Compton	Charles Trelawny	Emanuel Howe	John Sayers	Adrian van Borselen	James Stanley	Arnold Joost van Keppel	
29 Apr 1691	Percy Kirke	Hatton Compton	Charles Trelawny	Emanuel Howe	John Sayers	Adrian van Borselen	James Stanley	Arnold Joost van Keppel	Thomas Windsor
Jan 1692	George Cholmondeley	Hatton Compton		Emanuel Howe	John Sayers	Adrian van Borselen	James Stanley	Arnold Joost van Keppel	Thomas Windsor
6 May 1695	George Cholmondeley	Hatton Compton		Emanuel Howe	John Sayers	Adrian van Borselen	James Stanley	Thomas Wentworth	Thomas Windsor

Anne (1702–1714) No Grooms of the Bedchamber appointed

George I (1714–1727)

Date of appointment											
20 Sep 1714	William Kerr	James Tyrrell									
16 Oct 1714	William Kerr	James Tyrrell	James Dormer	Charles Howard	William Breton	George Feilding					
21 Oct 1714	William Kerr	James Tyrrell	James Dormer	Charles Howard	William Breton	George Feilding	Henry Cornewall	Philip Honywood			
15 Jun 1715	William Kerr	James Tyrrell	James Dormer	Charles Howard	Sir Gustavus Hume	George Feilding	Henry Cornewall	Philip Honywood			
13 May 1719	William Kerr	James Tyrrell	James Dormer	Charles Howard	Sir Gustavus Hume	George Feilding	Henry Cornewall	Philip Honywood	William Finch		
11 Jun 1720	William Kerr	James Tyrrell	James Dormer	Charles Howard	Sir Gustavus Hume	George Feilding	Henry Cornewall	Philip Honywood	William Finch	Sir Wilfrid Lawson	
10 Aug 1721	William Kerr	James Tyrrell	James Dormer	Charles Howard	Sir Gustavus Hume	George Feilding	Henry Cornewall	Philip Honywood	William Finch	Sir Wilfrid Lawson	Charles Cornwallis
24 Jun 1722	William Kerr	James Tyrrell	James Dormer	Charles Howard	Sir Gustavus Hume	George Feilding	Henry Cornewall	Philip Honywood	William Finch	Sir Wilfrid Lawson	
25 May 1723	William Kerr	James Tyrrell	James Dormer	Charles Howard	Sir Gustavus Hume	George Feilding	Henry Cornewall	Philip Honywood	William Finch	Robert Sawyer Herbert	

George II (1727–1760)

Date of appointment									
21 Aug 1727	Sir Robert Rich								
14 Sep 1727	Sir Robert Rich	Thomas Paget	Charles Lumley	John Selwyn	Charles Churchill	Charles Cathcart	John Campbell	Sir James Campbell	Sir Charles Hotham
7 May 1731	Sir Robert Rich	Thomas Paget		John Clavering	Charles Churchill	Charles Cathcart	John Campbell	Sir James Campbell	Sir Charles Hotham
7 May 1733	Sir Robert Rich	Thomas Paget		John Clavering	Charles Churchill	James Brudenell	John Campbell	Sir James Campbell	Sir Charles Hotham
22 Apr 1740	Sir Robert Rich	Thomas Paget	William Herbert	John Clavering	Charles Churchill	James Brudenell	John Campbell	Sir James Campbell	
14 Jul 1742	Sir Robert Rich	Edward Finch	William Herbert	John Clavering	Charles Churchill	James Brudenell	John Campbell	Sir James Campbell	
20 Jan 1746	Sir Robert Rich	Edward Finch	William Herbert	John Clavering	John Mostyn	James Brudenell	John Campbell		
22 Jan 1747	Sir Robert Rich	Edward Finch	William Herbert	John Clavering	John Mostyn	Edward Cornwallis	John Campbell	John Waldegrave, 3rd Earl Waldegrave	
5 Apr 1757	Sir Robert Rich	Edward Finch	Henry Seymour Conway	John Clavering	John Mostyn	Edward Cornwallis	John Campbell	John Waldegrave, 3rd Earl Waldegrave	
4 Jun 1757	Sir Robert Rich	John Offley	Henry Seymour Conway	John Clavering	John Mostyn	Edward Cornwallis	John Campbell	John Waldegrave, 3rd Earl Waldegrave	
16 Jan 1760	Charles FitzRoy	John Offley	Henry Seymour Conway	John Clavering	John Mostyn	Edward Cornwallis	John Campbell	John Waldegrave, 3rd Earl Waldegrave	
19 Jan 1760	Charles FitzRoy	John Offley	Henry Seymour Conway	John Clavering	John Mostyn	Edward Cornwallis	John Campbell	John Waldegrave, 3rd Earl Waldegrave	Richard Savage Nassau

George III (1760–1820)

Date of appointment															
27 Nov 1760	John Mostyn	John Waldegrave	John Offley	Charles FitzRoy	George Schutz	Sir James Peachey	Edmund Nugent	Sir William Breton	Edward Cornwallis	Henry Seymour Conway					
10 Dec 1760	John Mostyn	John Waldegrave	John Offley	Charles FitzRoy	George Schutz	Sir James Peachey	Edmund Nugent	Sir William Breton	Edward Cornwallis	Henry Seymour Conway	Spencer Compton				
11 Dec 1760	John Mostyn	John Waldegrave	John Offley	Charles FitzRoy	George Schutz	Sir James Peachey	Edmund Nugent	Sir William Breton	Edward Cornwallis	Henry Seymour Conway	Spencer Compton	George Pitt	Norborne Berkeley	William Northey	
17 Feb 1761	John Mostyn	John Waldegrave	John Offley	Charles FitzRoy	George Schutz	Sir James Peachey	Edmund Nugent	Sir William Breton	Edward Cornwallis	Henry Seymour Conway	Spencer Compton	George Pitt	Norborne Berkeley	William Northey	Augustus Keppel
10 Oct 1762	John Mostyn	John Waldegrave				Sir James Peachey	Edmund Nugent	Sir William Breton	Edward Cornwallis	Henry Seymour Conway	Spencer Compton	George Pitt	Norborne Berkeley	William Northey	Augustus Keppel
21 Dec 1762	John Mostyn	John Waldegrave	Sir James Wright			Sir James Peachey	Edmund Nugent	Sir William Breton	Edward Cornwallis	Henry Seymour Conway	Spencer Compton	George Pitt	Norborne Berkeley	William Northey	Augustus Keppel
19 Jan 1763	John Mostyn	John Waldegrave	Sir James Wright	Sir John Mordaunt		Sir James Peachey	Edmund Nugent	Sir William Breton	Edward Cornwallis	Henry Seymour Conway	Spencer Compton	George Pitt	Norborne Berkeley	William Northey	Augustus Keppel
16 Feb 1763	John Mostyn	John Waldegrave	Sir James Wright	Sir John Mordaunt	Henry Seymour	Sir James Peachey	Edmund Nugent	Sir William Breton	Edward Cornwallis	Henry Seymour Conway	Spencer Compton	George Pitt	Norborne Berkeley	William Northey	Augustus Keppel
5 May 1763	John Mostyn	Sir Charles Hotham-Thompson	Sir James Wright	Sir John Mordaunt	Henry Seymour	Sir James Peachey	Edmund Nugent	Sir William Breton	Edward Cornwallis	Henry Seymour Conway	Spencer Compton	George Pitt	Norborne Berkeley	William Northey	Augustus Keppel
5 Nov 1763	John Mostyn	Sir Charles Hotham-Thompson	Sir James Wright	Sir John Mordaunt	Henry Seymour	Sir James Peachey	Edmund Nugent	Sir William Breton	Edward Cornwallis	Henry Seymour Conway	Augustus John Hervey	George Pitt	Norborne Berkeley	William Northey	Augustus Keppel
April 1764	John Mostyn	Sir Charles Hotham-Thompson	Sir James Wright	Sir John Mordaunt	Henry Seymour	Sir James Peachey	Edmund Nugent	Sir William Breton			Augustus John Hervey	George Pitt	*	William Northey	Augustus Keppel
24 Aug 1765	John Mostyn	Sir Charles Hotham-Thompson	Sir James Wright	Sir John Mordaunt	Henry Wallop	Sir James Peachey	Edmund Nugent	Sir William Breton			Augustus John Hervey	George Pitt	*	William Northey	Augustus Keppel
3 Dec 1766	John Mostyn	Sir Charles Hotham-Thompson	Sir James Wright	Sir John Mordaunt	Henry Wallop	Sir James Peachey	Edmund Nugent	Sir William Breton			Augustus John Hervey	George Pitt	*	William Northey	William Harcourt
23 Apr 1770	John Mostyn	Sir Charles Hotham-Thompson	Sir James Wright	Sir John Mordaunt	Henry Wallop	Sir James Peachey	Edmund Nugent	Sir William Breton			Augustus John Hervey	George Pitt	*	Henry Vernon	William Harcourt
16 May 1770	John Mostyn	Sir Charles Hotham-Thompson	Sir James Wright	Sir John Mordaunt	Henry Wallop	Sir James Peachey	Edmund Nugent	Sir William Breton			Augustus John Hervey	Sir George Osborn	*	Henry Vernon	William Harcourt
10 May 1771	John Mostyn	Sir Charles Hotham-Thompson	Sir James Wright	Sir John Mordaunt	Henry Wallop	Sir James Peachey	Thomas de Grey	Sir William Breton			Augustus John Hervey	Sir George Osborn	*	Henry Vernon	William Harcourt
17 May 1771	John Mostyn	Sir Charles Hotham-Thompson	Sir James Wright	Sir John Mordaunt	Henry Wallop	Sir James Peachey	Thomas de Grey	Sir William Breton	Henry St John		Augustus John Hervey	Sir George Osborn	*	Henry Vernon	William Harcourt
3 Dec 1771	John Mostyn	Sir Charles Hotham-Thompson	Sir James Wright	Sir John Mordaunt	Philip Hales	Sir James Peachey	Thomas de Grey	Sir William Breton	Henry St John		Augustus John Hervey	Sir George Osborn	*	Henry Vernon	William Harcourt
8 Feb 1773	John Mostyn	Sir Charles Hotham-Thompson	Sir James Wright	Sir John Mordaunt	Philip Hales	Sir James Peachey	Thomas de Grey	*	Henry St John		Augustus John Hervey	Sir George Osborn	*	Henry Vernon	William Harcourt
28 Mar 1775	John Mostyn	Sir Charles Hotham-Thompson	Sir James Wright	Sir John Mordaunt	Philip Hales	Sir James Peachey	Thomas de Grey	*	Henry St John		William Gordon	Sir George Osborn	*	Henry Vernon	William Harcourt
18 Jun 1777	John Mostyn	Sir Charles Hotham-Thompson	Sir James Wright	Sir John Mordaunt	Philip Hales	Sir James Peachey	Charles Herbert	*	Henry St John		William Gordon	Sir George Osborn	*	Henry Vernon	William Harcourt
22 Feb 1779	Francis Lascelles	Sir Charles Hotham-Thompson	Sir James Wright	Sir John Mordaunt	Philip Hales	Sir James Peachey	Charles Herbert	*	Henry St John		William Gordon	Sir George Osborn	*	Henry Vernon	William Harcourt
17 Jan 1783	Francis Lascelles	Sir Charles Hotham-Thompson	Sir James Wright	Sir John Mordaunt	Philip Hales	Sir James Peachey	Charles Herbert	*	Henry St John	George Villiers	William Gordon	Sir George Osborn	*	Henry Vernon	William Harcourt
19 Aug 1784	Francis Lascelles	Sir Charles Hotham-Thompson	Sir James Wright	Sir John Mordaunt	Philip Hales	Sir James Peachey	Charles Herbert	*	Robert Waller	George Villiers	William Gordon	Sir George Osborn	*	Henry Vernon	William Harcourt
20 Jan 1788	Francis Lascelles	James Whorwood Adeane	Sir James Wright	Sir John Mordaunt	Philip Hales	Sir James Peachey	Charles Herbert	*	Robert Waller	George Villiers	William Gordon	Sir George Osborn	*	Henry Vernon	William Harcourt
3 Jun 1791	Francis Lascelles	James Whorwood Adeane	Sir James Wright	Sir John Mordaunt	Philip Hales	Robert Digby	Charles Herbert	*	Robert Waller	George Villiers	William Gordon	Sir George Osborn	*	Henry Vernon	William Harcourt
26 Jan 1793	Francis Lascelles	James Whorwood Adeane	Sir James Wright	Thomas Fane	Philip Hales	Robert Digby	Charles Herbert	*	Robert Waller	George Villiers	William Gordon	Sir George Osborn	*	Henry Vernon	William Harcourt
29 Mar 1800	Robert Fulke Greville	James Whorwood Adeane	Sir James Wright	Thomas Fane	Philip Hales	Robert Digby	Charles Herbert	*	Robert Waller	George Villiers	William Gordon	Sir George Osborn	*	Henry Vernon	William Harcourt
30 May 1801	Robert Fulke Greville	James Whorwood Adeane	Arthur Kaye Legge	Thomas Fane	Philip Hales	Robert Digby	Charles Herbert	*	Sir Harry Burrard-Neale	George Villiers	William Gordon	Sir George Osborn	*	Henry Vernon	William Harcourt
27 Apr 1802	Robert Fulke Greville	Edward Finch	Arthur Kaye Legge	Thomas Fane	Philip Hales	Robert Digby	Charles Herbert	*	Sir Harry Burrard-Neale	George Villiers	William Gordon	Sir George Osborn	*	Henry Vernon	William Harcourt
24 May 1804	Robert Fulke Greville	Edward Finch	Arthur Kaye Legge	Thomas Fane	Philip Hales	Robert Digby	Charles Herbert	*	Sir Harry Burrard-Neale	George Villiers	William Gordon	Sir George Osborn	*	Henry Vernon	William Harcourt
15 Apr 1807	Robert Fulke Greville	Edward Finch	Arthur Kaye Legge	*	Philip Hales	Robert Digby	Charles Herbert	*	Sir Harry Burrard-Neale	George Villiers	William Gordon	Sir George Osborn	*	Henry Vernon	William Harcourt
31 Oct 1808	Robert Fulke Greville	Edward Finch	Arthur Kaye Legge	*	Philip Hales	Edward Capel	Charles Herbert	*	Sir Harry Burrard-Neale	George Villiers	William Gordon	Sir George Osborn	*	Henry Vernon	William Harcourt
1 Nov 1808	Robert Fulke Greville	Edward Finch	Arthur Kaye Legge	*	Philip Hales	Edward Capel	Charles Herbert	*	Sir Harry Burrard-Neale	George Villiers	William Gordon	Sir George Osborn	*	Henry Vernon	Edward Pery Buckley
4 Mar 1809	Robert Fulke Greville	Edward Finch	Arthur Kaye Legge	*	Philip Hales	Edward Capel	Charles Herbert	*	Sir Harry Burrard-Neale	George Villiers	William Gordon	Sir George Osborn	*	Henry Vernon	Henry Frederick Campbell
2 June 1809	Robert Fulke Greville	Edward Finch	Arthur Kaye Legge	*	Philip Hales	Edward Capel	Charles Herbert	*	Sir Harry Burrard-Neale	George Villiers	William Gordon	Sir George Osborn	*	Frederick West	Henry Frederick Campbell
18 Feb 1812	Robert Fulke Greville	Edward Finch		*	Philip Hales		Charles Herbert	*		George Villiers	William Gordon	Sir George Osborn	*	Frederick West	
10 Mar 1812	William Keppel	Edward Finch	Gen. Thomas Slaughter Stanwix	*	Gen. Edmund Stevens	Wilson Braddyll	Charles Herbert	*	William Lumley	Charles Nassau Thomas	Henry Fitzroy Stanhope	Gen. Charles Leigh	*		
10 Apr 1812	William Keppel	Edward Finch	Gen. Thomas Slaughter Stanwix	Sir John Francis Cradock	Gen. Edmund Stevens	Wilson Braddyll	Charles Herbert		William Lumley	Charles Nassau Thomas	Henry Fitzroy Stanhope	Gen. Charles Leigh			
28 Jul 1812	William Keppel	Edward Finch	Gen. Thomas Slaughter Stanwix	Sir John Francis Cradock	Gen. Edmund Stevens	Wilson Braddyll	Charles Herbert	Augustus Cavendish-Bradshaw	William Lumley	Charles Nassau Thomas	Henry Fitzroy Stanhope	Gen. Charles Leigh	Charles William Stewart	Tomkyns Hilgrove Turner	
6 Jun 1816	William Keppel	Edward Finch	Sir Edward Paget	Sir John Francis Cradock	Gen. Edmund Stevens	Wilson Braddyll	Charles Herbert	Augustus Cavendish-Bradshaw	William Lumley	Charles Nassau Thomas	Henry Fitzroy Stanhope			Tomkyns Hilgrove Turner	
6 Sep 1816	William Keppel	Edward Finch	Sir Edward Paget	Sir John Francis Cradock	Gen. Edmund Stevens	Wilson Braddyll	Sir George Campbell	Augustus Cavendish-Bradshaw	William Lumley	Charles Nassau Thomas	Henry Fitzroy Stanhope			Tomkyns Hilgrove Turner	
5 Jan 1817	William Keppel	Edward Finch	Sir Edward Paget	Sir John Francis Cradock	Gen. Edmund Stevens	Wilson Braddyll	Sir George Campbell	Augustus Cavendish-Bradshaw	William Lumley	Charles Nassau Thomas	Henry Fitzroy Stanhope	Henry King		Tomkyns Hilgrove Turner	
21 Nov 1818	William Keppel	Edward Finch	Sir Edward Paget	Sir John Francis Cradock	Gen. Edmund Stevens	Joseph Whatley	Sir George Campbell	Augustus Cavendish-Bradshaw	William Lumley	Charles Nassau Thomas	Henry Fitzroy Stanhope	Henry King		Tomkyns Hilgrove Turner	
19 Oct 1819	William Keppel	Edward Finch	Sir Edward Paget	Sir Edmund Nagle	Gen. Edmund Stevens	Joseph Whatley	Sir George Campbell	Augustus Cavendish-Bradshaw	William Lumley	Charles Nassau Thomas	Henry Fitzroy Stanhope	Henry King		Tomkyns Hilgrove Turner	

George IV (1820–1830)

Date of appointment													
Jan 1820	Edward Finch	William Keppel	Edmund Stevens	William Lumley	Charles Nassau Thomas	Henry Fitzroy Stanhope	Augustus Cavendish-Bradshaw	Tomkyns Hilgrove Turner	Sir Edward Paget	Sir George Campbell	Henry King	Joseph Whatley	Sir Edmund Nagle
4 Apr 1820	Edward Finch	William Keppel	Edmund Stevens	William Lumley	Lord Francis Nathaniel Conyngham	Henry Fitzroy Stanhope	Augustus Cavendish-Bradshaw	Tomkyns Hilgrove Turner	Sir Edward Paget	Sir George Campbell	Henry King	Joseph Whatley	Sir Edmund Nagle
24 Jan 1821	Edward Finch	William Keppel	Edmund Stevens	William Lumley	Lord Francis Nathaniel Conyngham	Henry Fitzroy Stanhope	Augustus Cavendish-Bradshaw	Tomkyns Hilgrove Turner	Sir Edward Paget	Sir Andrew Barnard	Henry King	Joseph Whatley	Sir Edmund Nagle
11 Oct 1821	Edward Finch	William Keppel	Edmund Stevens	William Lumley	Lord Francis Nathaniel Conyngham	Henry Fitzroy Stanhope	Augustus Cavendish-Bradshaw	Tomkyns Hilgrove Turner	Sir Charles Paget	Sir Andrew Barnard	Henry King	Joseph Whatley	Sir Edmund Nagle
7 Sep 1825	Edward Finch	William Keppel	Sir William Houston	William Lumley	Lord Francis Nathaniel Conyngham	Henry Fitzroy Stanhope	Augustus Cavendish-Bradshaw	Tomkyns Hilgrove Turner	Sir Charles Paget	Sir Andrew Barnard	Henry King	Joseph Whatley	Sir Edmund Nagle
27 May 1828	Edward Finch	William Keppel	Sir William Houston	William Lumley	Lord Francis Nathaniel Conyngham	Henry Fitzroy Stanhope	Augustus Cavendish-Bradshaw	Tomkyns Hilgrove Turner	Sir Charles Paget	Thomas Armstrong	Henry King	Joseph Whatley	Sir Edmund Nagle
24 Sep 1828	Edward Finch	William Keppel	Sir William Houston	William Lumley	Lord Francis Nathaniel Conyngham	John Robert Townshend	Augustus Cavendish-Bradshaw	Tomkyns Hilgrove Turner	Sir Charles Paget	Thomas Armstrong	Henry King	Joseph Whatley	Sir Edmund Nagle
14 Feb 1830	Edward Finch	William Keppel	Sir William Houston	William Lumley	Lord Francis Nathaniel Conyngham	John Robert Townshend	Augustus Cavendish-Bradshaw	Tomkyns Hilgrove Turner	Sir Charles Paget	Thomas Armstrong	George Cecil Weld-Forester	Joseph Whatley	Sir Edmund Nagle
15 Mar 1830	Edward Finch	William Keppel	Sir William Houston	William Lumley	Lord Francis Nathaniel Conyngham	John Robert Townshend	Augustus Cavendish-Bradshaw	Tomkyns Hilgrove Turner	Sir Charles Paget	Thomas Armstrong	George Cecil Weld-Forester	Joseph Whatley	Henry Thomas Hope

William IV (1830–1837)

Date of appointment													
June 1830	Edward Finch	William Keppel	William Lumley	Augustus Cavendish-Bradshaw	Tomkyns Hilgrove Turner	Joseph Whatley	Sir Charles Paget	Sir William Houston	Thomas Armstrong	John Robert Townshend	George Cecil Weld-Forester	Henry Thomas Hope	
17 Jul 1830	Edward Finch	Sir Hussey Vivian	William Lumley	Augustus Cavendish-Bradshaw	Tomkyns Hilgrove Turner	Joseph Whatley	Sir Charles Paget	Sir William Houston	Thomas Armstrong	John Robert Townshend	George Cecil Weld-Forester	Henry Thomas Hope	
24 Jul 1830	Edward Finch	Sir Hussey Vivian	William Lumley	Augustus Cavendish-Bradshaw	Tomkyns Hilgrove Turner	Joseph Whatley	Sir Charles Paget	Sir William Houston	Thomas Armstrong	John Robert Townshend	George Cecil Weld-Forester	Henry Thomas Hope	Sir Robert Cavendish Spencer
30 Nov 1830	Edward Finch	Sir Hussey Vivian	William Lumley	Augustus Cavendish-Bradshaw	Tomkyns Hilgrove Turner	Joseph Whatley	Sir Charles Paget	Sir William Houston	Thomas Armstrong	John Robert Townshend	George Cecil Weld-Forester	Sir Henry Blackwood, 1st Baronet	
23 Dec 1830	Edward Finch	Sir Hussey Vivian	William Lumley	Augustus Cavendish-Bradshaw	Tomkyns Hilgrove Turner	Joseph Whatley	Sir Charles Paget	Sir William Houston	Thomas Armstrong	John Robert Townshend	George Cecil Weld-Forester	Sir Henry Blackwood, 1st Baronet	Sir Robert Otway
31 Jan 1831	Edward Finch	Sir Hussey Vivian	William Lumley	Augustus Cavendish-Bradshaw	Tomkyns Hilgrove Turner	Joseph Whatley	Sir Charles Paget	Sir William Houston	Thomas Armstrong	Sir James Reynett	George Cecil Weld-Forester	Sir Henry Blackwood, 1st Baronet	Sir Robert Otway
24 Feb 1831	Edward Finch	Sir Hussey Vivian	William Lumley	Augustus Cavendish-Bradshaw	Tomkyns Hilgrove Turner	Joseph Whatley	Sir Charles Paget	Sir William Houston	Thomas Armstrong	Sir James Reynett	George Pryse Campbell	Sir Henry Blackwood, 1st Baronet	Sir Robert Otway
12 Nov 1832	Edward Finch	Sir Hussey Vivian	William Lumley	Sir Charles Rowley, 1st Baronet	Tomkyns Hilgrove Turner	Joseph Whatley	Sir Charles Paget	Sir William Houston	Thomas Armstrong	Sir James Reynett	George Pryse Campbell	Sir Henry Blackwood, 1st Baronet	Sir Robert Otway
15 Dec 1832	Edward Finch	Sir Hussey Vivian	William Lumley	Sir Charles Rowley, 1st Baronet	Tomkyns Hilgrove Turner	Joseph Whatley	Sir Charles Paget	Sir William Houston	Thomas Armstrong	Sir James Reynett	George Pryse Campbell	Thomas William Taylor	Sir Robert Otway
20 Jun 1837	Accession of Queen Victoria.												

Victoria (1837–1901) No Grooms of the Bedchamber appointed

Edward VII (1901–1910) The term "Groom-in-Waiting" was employed

George V (1910–1936)

Date appointed							
10 Jun 1910	Captain Walter Douglas Somerset Campbell	Captain Seymour John Fortescue	Commander Charles Elphinstone Fleeming Cunninghame Graham	Sidney Robert Greville	Colonel William Lambton	Harry Stonor	Edward William Wallington Esq.

The above-mentioned were gazetted as "Grooms of the Bedchamber in Waiting"; subsequently, the term "Groom in Waiting in Ordinary" was used.

Edward VIII (1936) The term "Groom-in-Waiting" was employed.

George VI (1936–1952) The term "Groom-in-Waiting" was employed.

Elizabeth II (1952–2022) No Grooms of the Bedchamber appointed.

Charles III (2022–) No Grooms of the Bedchamber appointed.

== In France ==
The French portrait painter Jean Clouet (c. 1485–1540) was appointed a valet de chambre groom of the chamber of the French monarchy in 1523 by Francis I of France, as was his son François Clouet later. The office could serve as a sinecure to provide a minimum income and social place for someone who enjoyed royal favor.

Many noble households in Europe had their own grooms of the chamber, known by various titles. See Valet de chambre for a fuller account.

== See also ==
- Groom of the Robes
- Groom of the Stool
- Gentleman of the Bedchamber
