= John Payn (MP for Cambridge) =

Member of the Parliament of England

John Payn (fl. 1391) of Swaffham Prior, Cambridgeshire, was an English politician, lawyer and landowner.

He was a Member (MP) of the Parliament of England for Cambridge in 1391.
