= John Camp (English politician) =

14th-century English politician

John Camp (died c. 1395), of Cambridge and Dullingham, Cambridgeshire, was an English politician and lawyer.

== Family ==
His first wife was named Katherine. His second wife, Elizabeth, bore him a son, Thomas Camp, who was MP for Cambridgeshire.

== Career ==
He was a Member (MP) of the Parliament of England for Cambridge in February 1388 and 1391.
