= Robert Attilbridge =

English politician

Robert Attilbridge (fl. 1399–1427) was an English politician. He sat as MP for Cambridge in May 1413 and again in 1417.

He also served as treasurer of Cambridge from April 1425 till 1426 and as bailiff of Cambridge from September 1426 till 1427.
