= Thomas Camp =

English politician

Thomas Camp (fl. 1420), of Litlington, Cambridgeshire, was an English politician.

== Family ==
Camp was the son of the MP, John Camp.

== Career ==
Camp was a member (MP) of the parliament of England for Cambridgeshire in 1420.
