= Frederick Trench (British Army officer) =

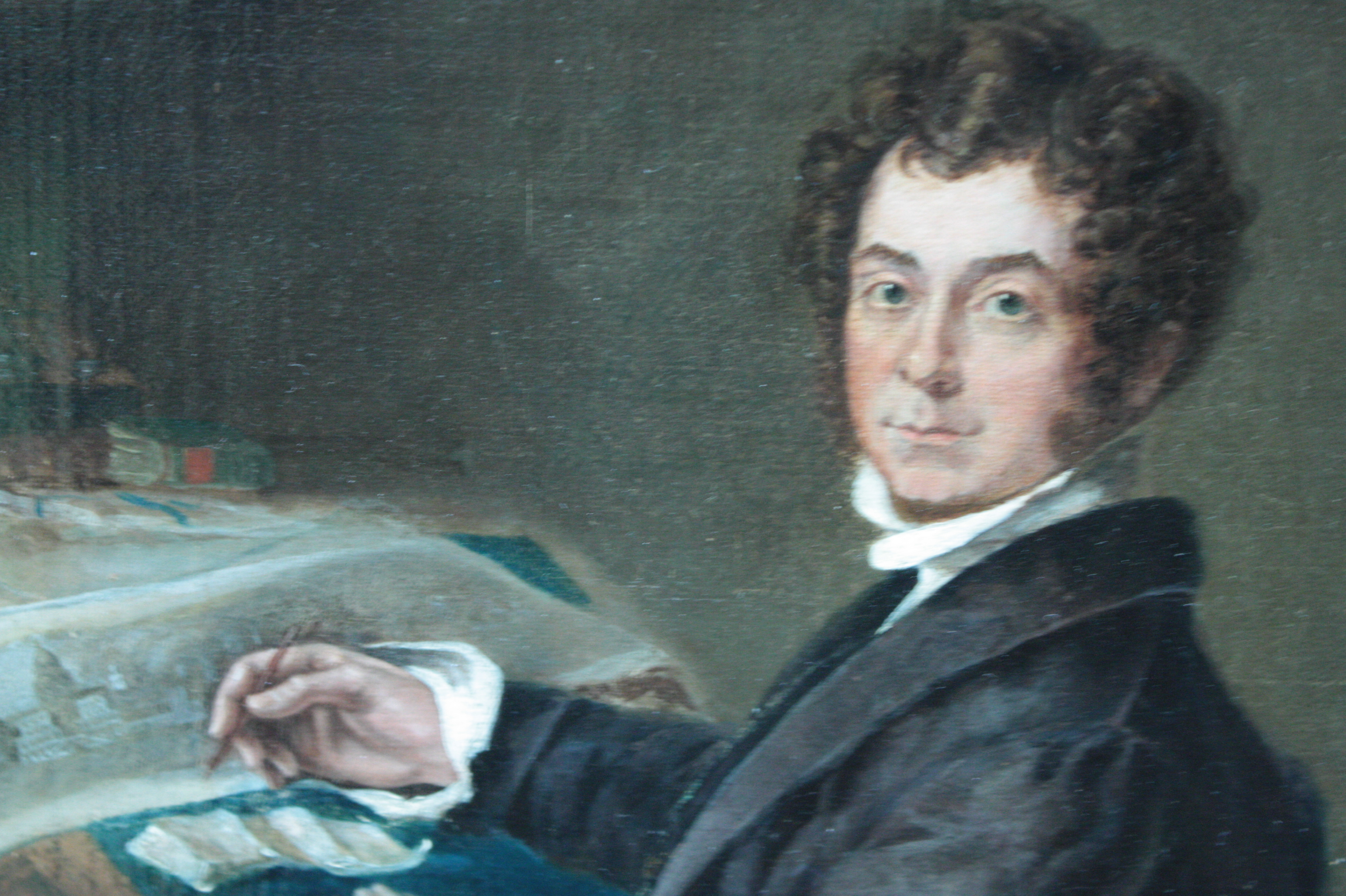
Frederick William Trench (detail), 1827, National Gallery, London

General Sir Frederick William Trench KCH (1775 – 6 December 1859), was a British Army officer and Tory politician.

== Family background ==
Trench was the son of Michael Frederick Trench, a barrister and amateur architect, of Heywood, only son of Reverend Frederick Trench, of Ballinakill, in Queen's County (now County Laois). His mother was Anne Helena, daughter and heiress of Patrick Stewart, second son of James Stewart, of Killymoon, County Tyrone. His younger brother was Rev. Dr. Stewart Segar Trench LLD, Vicar of Swords, and Cloghran, and Chancellor of Christchurch (1826–1853). The Earls of Clancarty were members of another branch of the Trench family.

== Military career ==
He was commissioned as an ensign and lieutenant in the 1st Foot Guards then promoted to lieutenant and captain on 12 November 1807. Trench served on the quartermaster's staff in Sicily in 1806-7 and was part of the disastrous 1809 Walcheren Expedition. He was sent to Cádiz in 1811 during the Peninsular War until on 1 August he was promoted to major and appointed assistant quartermaster-general in the Kent district.

After his appointment as deputy quartermaster-general to the corps on 25 November 1813, he accompanied General Sir Thomas Graham to Holland in 1814 as a lieutenant-colonel. In 1814 he was placed on half-pay and became an aide-de-camp to the King on 27 May 1825. Under the Wellington ministry he was appointed Storekeeper of the Ordnance in 1829, a post he held until 1831. He was promoted to general in 1846.

== Political career ==
He sat as a Member of Parliament (MP) for Mitchell between 1806 and 1807, for Dundalk between February and October 1812, for Cambridge between 1819 and 1832 and for Scarborough between 1835 and 1847.

Trench also proposed several "improvement schemes" in London, most notably The Embankment (conceived to relieve traffic on the Strand and provide a pleasant riverside walk) but this was not completed until five years after he died in Brighton on 6 December 1859.

Parliament of the United Kingdom
Preceded by Robert Ainslie; Earl of Dalkeith	Member of Parliament for Mitchell; 1806–1807; With: Sir Christopher Hawkins (never sat)	Succeeded by Hon. Sir Arthur Wellesley; Henry Montgomery
Preceded by Thomas Hughan	Member of Parliament for Dundalk; February–October 1812	Succeeded by John Metge
Preceded by Edward Finch; Robert Manners	Member of Parliament for Cambridge; 1819–1832; With: Robert Manners 1819–1820; Charles Madryll Cheere 1820–1825; Marquess of Graham 1825–1832	Succeeded by George Pryme; Thomas Spring Rice
Preceded by Sir John Vanden-Bempde-Johnstone, Bt; Sir George Cayley	Member of Parliament for Scarborough; 1835–1847; With: Sir John Vanden-Bempde-Johnstone, Bt 1835–1837, 1841–1847; Sir Thomas Style, Bt 1837–1841	Succeeded by Sir John Vanden-Bempde-Johnstone, Bt; Earl of Mulgrave
Military offices
Preceded by Mark Singleton	Storekeeper of the Ordnance; 1829–1831	Succeeded by Hon. Henry Duncan
