= Cambridge (constituency) =

Parliamentary constituency in the United Kingdom, 1801 onwards

Coordinates: 52.203°N 0.131°E

- Borough constituency for the House of Commons
- Interactive map of boundaries from 2024
- Location within the East of England
- County: Cambridgeshire
- Population: 114,740 (2011 census)
- Electorate: 72,560 (M<arch 2020)
- Major settlements: Cambridge, Trumpington

Current constituency
- Created: 1295
- Member of Parliament: Daniel Zeichner (Labour)
- Seats: 1295–1885: Two; 1885–present: One

Cambridge is a constituency (Note: A borough constituency (for the purposes of election expenses and type of returning officer)) represented in the House of Commons of the UK Parliament since 2015 by Daniel Zeichner of the Labour Party. (Note: As with all constituencies, the constituency elects one Member of Parliament (MP) by the first past the post system of election at least every five years.)

== History ==
Centred on the university city of Cambridge, Cambridge is one of the country's oldest continuously constituted constituencies. It was created in 1295 and returned two Members of Parliament (MPs) and was represented in the House of Commons of England until 1707, then in the House of Commons of Great Britain from 1707 to 1800, and then in the House of Commons of the United Kingdom from 1801 to 1885. From 1885 onwards, the seat has elected one MP.

It was held by the Conservatives from 1967 to 1992, since which time it has been represented alternately by both Labour and the Liberal Democrats.

In the 2016 referendum to leave the European Union, the constituency voted 73.8% to remain.

== Constituency profile ==
The Cambridge constituency covers the majority of the city of Cambridge in the East of England, except some outlying suburbs. Cambridge is a historic settlement dating back to Roman times and was traditionally an important market town supporting trade between London and East Anglia. The city is a popular tourist destination and was described by Forbes as one of the "most beautiful cities in the world". It is known for the University of Cambridge, which consistently ranks as one of the best universities in the world.

Compared to national averages, residents of Cambridge are considerably younger and have low levels of marriage and homeownership. Residents are highly educated and more likely to work in professional jobs. Income and house prices are high. Parts of the city are in the 10% least-deprived areas in England, although there is some deprivation in the Chesterton suburban area. White people make up 75% of the population with Asians being the largest ethnic minority group at 14%. Cambridge has the highest proportion of Chinese people (4.3%) in the country outside the City of London. At the county and city council levels, the city is represented by a mixture of Liberal Democrat, Labour Party and Green Party councillors. In the 2016 referendum on European Union membership, an estimated 75% of voters in the constituency supported remaining in the European Union, one of the top 20 highest rates out of 650 constituencies nationwide.

== Political History ==
=== Overview of results before 1992 ===
Cambridge returned two Members to Parliament from 1295 until 1885, using the bloc vote system. These were generally townsmen who were involved in local government, with at least sixty mayors of Cambridge having served as MP by 1621. Under the Redistribution of Seats Act 1885 representation was reduced to one member, using the first-past-the-post system, with effect from the 1885 general election.

From 1910 to 1992, Cambridge was won by the Conservatives, save for the periods 1945 to 1950 and 1966 to 1967, when it was Labour-held with small majorities.

Related extra representation 1603–1950

Historically, the city of Cambridge retained some electors, and was often the source of MPs to a second constituency, for Cambridge University, covering all successful alumni in its electorate. The university seat was created in 1603 as part of the scheme of university constituencies. Its MPs included Isaac Newton, William Pitt the Younger, Lord Palmerston, George Stokes, Richard Jebb, and Archibald Hill before abolition in 1950.

=== Overview of results since 1992 ===
In 1992, Cambridge was won by Labour's Anne Campbell, who held onto the seat for 13 years (three Parliamentary terms). In 2005, it was taken by David Howarth of the Liberal Democrats, the first time the party (including its two forerunner parties) had taken the seat since the 1906 Liberal-progressive landslide; his successor, Julian Huppert, held the seat with an increased majority in the 2010 general election. In 2015, Huppert was unseated by the Labour candidate, Daniel Zeichner, who took the seat with a thin majority of 599 votes. The 2015 result gave the seat the 7th-smallest majority of Labour's 232 seats by percentage of majority. Zeichner went on to hold the seat at the 2017 and 2019 elections with comfortable majorities.

Most recent results of other parties

In 2015, three other parties' candidates kept their deposits, by winning more than 5% of the vote. In order of public preference, these candidates stood for the Conservatives, Green Party and UKIP, respectively.

Turnout since 1918

Turnout at general elections has ranged between 86.48% in 1950 to 60.6% in 2001.

== Boundaries and boundary changes ==
=== Historic ===
==== 1868–1918 ====
- The Borough of Cambridge, plus the village of Chesterton.

==== 1918–1950 ====
- The Borough of Cambridge.

Under the Representation of the People Act 1918, the boundaries were expanded to align with those of the Municipal Borough, incorporating further parts of the former Urban District of Chesterton to the north, and the parish of Cambridge Without to the south.

==== 1950–1983 ====
- The Borough of Cambridge, but with redrawn boundaries.

Under the Representation of the People Act 1948, the boundaries were further expanded for the 1950 general election.

==== 1983–2010 ====
- The City of Cambridge wards of Abbey, Arbury, Castle, Cherry Hinton, Coleridge, East Chesterton, King's Hedges, Market, Newnham, Petersfield, Romsey, and West Chesterton.

The Queen Edith's and Trumpington wards were included in South West Cambridgeshire (South Cambridgeshire from 1997).

==== 2010–2024 ====
Map of boundaries 2010-2024

- The City of Cambridge wards of Abbey, Arbury, Castle, Cherry Hinton, Coleridge, East Chesterton, King's Hedges, Market, Newnham, Petersfield, Romsey, Trumpington, and West Chesterton.

Trumpington ward returned from South Cambridgeshire.

=== Current ===
Further to the 2023 review of Westminster constituencies, which came into effect for the 2024 general election, the composition of the constituency was reduced in size with the transfer of the Cherry Hinton ward to South Cambridgeshire.

== Members of Parliament ==
Constituency created (1295)

=== MPs 1386–1660 ===
Elections in (brackets) are by-elections.

Parliament	First member	Second member	Ref.
1386	Robert Brigham	John Herries	
Feb 1388	John Cotton	John Camp	
Sep 1388	John Blankpayn	John Marshall	
Jan 1390	Richard Maisterman	Robert Goodrich	
Nov 1390			
1391	John Camp	John Payn	
1393	John Herries	Robert Goodrich	
1394	Robert Brigham	Robert Goodrich	
1395	Robert Brigham	John Thriplow	
Jan 1397	Hugh Candlesby	John Thriplow	
Sep 1397	Thomas Trivet	Simon Bentbow	
1399	Hugh Candlesby	William Salle	
1401			
1402	Robert Brigham	Thomas Trivet	
Jan 1404			
Oct 1404			
1406	John Knapton	John Bilney	
1407	Simon Bentbow	Thomas Beverley	
1410			
1411	John Bush	John Alderhithe	
Feb 1413			
May 1413	Stephen Neel	Robert Attilbridge	
Apr 1414	John Beverley	John Warwick	
Nov 1414	John Greenlane	John Hokington	
1415	John Knapton	Thomas Beverley	
Mar 1416	John Bilney	John Sexton	
Oct 1416			
1417	John Bilney	Robert Attilbridge	
1419	John Knapton	Henry Topcliffe	
1420	John Cappe	Henry Topcliffe	
May 1421	John Greenlane	John Bilney	
Dec 1421	Richard Andrew	William Wedgwood	
1447	John Say		
1510			
1512	John Bury	John Erlich	
1515			
1523			
1529	Thomas Brakyn	Robert Chapman	
1536	Thomas Brakyn	Robert Chapman	
1539	Thomas Brakyn	Robert Chapman	
1542	Thomas Brakyn	Edward Slegge	
1545	John Rust	Simon Trew	
1547	John Fanne (died in office)	Richard Brakyn	
(1552)	John Rust	Richard Brakyn	
Mar 1553	Robert Chapman	Alexander Ray	
Oct 1553	James Fletcher	Richard Brakyn	
Apr 1554	John Rust	Richard Brakyn	
Nov 1554	Robert Chapman	Richard Brassney	
1555	Alexander Ray	Lawrence Hawes	
1558	John Line	Thomas Ventris	
1558–1559	Thomas Ventris	Roger Slegge	
1562–1563	Henry Serle	Roger Slegge	
Mar 1571	Robert Shute	Roger Slegge	
Apr 1572	Robert Shute	Roger Slegge	
(1581)	John North	Roger Slegge	
Nov 1584	Henry North	Roger Slegge	
Oct 1586	John Edmonds	Roger Slegge	
Oct 1588	Nicholas Gaunte	Roger Slegge	
1593	Thomas Goldsborough	Christopher Hodson	
Oct 1597	Robert Wallis	John Yaxley	
Oct 1601	Robert Wallis	John Yaxley	
1604	Robert Wallis	John Yaxley	
1614	Sir Robert Hitcham	Francis Brakin	
1621	Richard Foxton	Thomas Meautys	
Mar 1621	Sir John Hobart	Thomas Meautys	
1624	Francis Brakyn	Robert Luckyn	
1625	Talbot Pepys	Thomas Meautys	
1626	John Thompson	Thomas Meautys	
1628	Thomas Purchase	Thomas Meautys	
1629–1640	No Parliaments summoned		
Apr 1640	Oliver Cromwell	Thomas Meautys	
Nov 1640	Oliver Cromwell	John Lowry	
1653	Cambridge not represented in Barebone's Parliament		
1654	Richard Timbs		
1656	Richard Timbs		
1659	John Lowry	Richard Timbs	

=== MPs 1660–1885 ===
Election	1st Member	1st Party	2nd Member	2nd Party
1660	Sir Dudley North		Sir Thomas Willys, Bt	
1661	Sir William Compton		Roger Pepys	
1664	The Lord Alington		Roger Pepys	
1679	The Lord Alington		Sir Thomas Chicheley	
1685	Sir William Wren		Sir Thomas Chicheley	
1689	Sir John Cotton, Bt		Sir Thomas Chicheley	
1690	Sir John Cotton, Bt		Granado Pigot	
1695	John Pepys		Isaac Watlington	
1696	Sir John Cotton, Bt		Isaac Watlington	
1698	Sir John Cotton, Bt		Sir Henry Pickering, Bt	
1702	Anthony Thompson		Sir Henry Pickering, Bt	
1705	Anthony Thompson		Sir John Cotton, Bt	
1708	Sir John Hynde Cotton, Bt	Tory	Samuel Shepheard	
January 1715	Sir John Hynde Cotton, Bt	Tory	Thomas Sclater	Tory
May 1715	Sir John Hynde Cotton, Bt	Tory	Samuel Shepheard	
January 1722	Sir John Hynde Cotton, Bt	Tory	Thomas Bacon	Tory
October 1722	Gilbert Affleck		Thomas Bacon	Tory
1727	Sir John Hynde Cotton, Bt		Thomas Bacon	Tory
1737	Sir John Hynde Cotton, Bt		Gilbert Affleck	
1741	Viscount Dupplin	Whig	James Martin	
1744	Viscount Dupplin	Whig	Christopher Jeaffreson	
1747	Viscount Dupplin	Whig	Samuel Shepheard	
1748	Viscount Dupplin	Whig	Christopher Jeaffreson	
1749	Viscount Dupplin	Whig	Charles Cadogan	Tory
1754	Viscount Dupplin	Whig	Hon. Thomas Bromley	Whig
1755	Viscount Dupplin	Whig	Charles Cadogan	Tory
1758	Soame Jenyns	Tory	Charles Cadogan	Tory
1776	Soame Jenyns	Tory	Benjamin Keene	Tory
1780	James Whorwood Adeane	Tory	Benjamin Keene	Tory
1784	James Whorwood Adeane	Tory	John Mortlock	Whig
1788	James Whorwood Adeane	Tory	Francis Dickins	Tory
1789	Edward Finch	Tory	Francis Dickins	Tory
1791	Edward Finch	Tory	Robert Manners	Tory
1819	Frederick Trench	Tory	Robert Manners	Tory
1820	Frederick Trench	Tory	Charles Madryll Cheere	Tory
1825	Frederick Trench	Tory	Marquess of Graham	Tory
1832	George Pryme	Whig	Thomas Spring Rice	Whig
1839	George Pryme	Whig	John Manners-Sutton	Conservative
1840	George Pryme	Whig	Sir Alexander Grant, Bt	Conservative
1841	Hon. John Manners-Sutton	Conservative	Sir Alexander Grant, Bt	Conservative
1843	Hon. John Manners-Sutton	Conservative	Fitzroy Kelly	Conservative
1847	Robert Adair	Whig	Hon. William Campbell	Whig
1852	Kenneth Macaulay	Conservative	John Harvey Astell	Conservative
March 1853	Writ suspended			
1854	Robert Adair	Radical	Francis Mowatt	Radical
1857	Kenneth Macaulay	Conservative	Andrew Steuart	Conservative
1863	Kenneth Macaulay	Conservative	Francis Powell	Conservative
1865	William Forsyth	Conservative	Francis Powell	Conservative
1866	John Eldon Gorst	Conservative	Francis Powell	Conservative
1868	Robert Torrens	Liberal	William Fowler	Liberal
1874	Alfred Marten	Conservative	Patrick Smollett	Conservative
1880	William Fowler	Liberal	Hugh Shield	Liberal
1885	representation reduced to one member			

=== MPs since 1885 ===
Election	Member	Party
1885	Robert Uniacke-Penrose-Fitzgerald	Conservative
1906	Stanley Buckmaster	Liberal
Jan 1910	Almeric Paget	Conservative
1917 by-election	Sir Eric Geddes	Coalition Conservative
1922 by-election	Sir George Newton	Conservative
1934 by-election	Richard Tufnell	Conservative
1945	Arthur Symonds	Labour
1950	Sir Hamilton Kerr, Bt.	Conservative
1966	Robert Davies	Labour
1967 by-election	David Lane	Conservative
1976 by-election	Robert Rhodes James	Conservative
1992	Anne Campbell	Labour
2005	David Howarth	Liberal Democrat
2010	Julian Huppert	Liberal Democrat
2015	Daniel Zeichner	Labour

== Elections ==
2010s – 2000s – 1990s – 1980s – 1970s – 1960s – 1950s – 1940s – 1930s – 1920s – 1910s – 1900s – 1890s – 1880s – 1870s – 1860s– 1850s– 1840s– 1830s– 1820s– 1810s– 1800s– 1790s– 1780s– 1770s– 1760s– 1750s– Back to Top

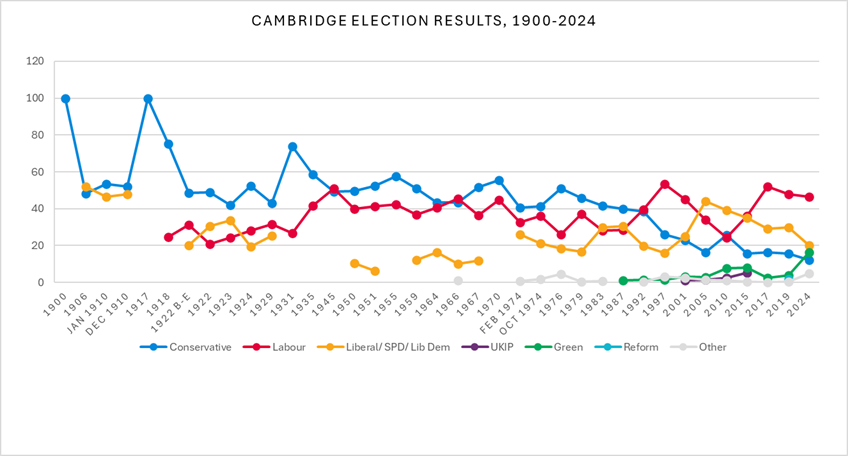
Cambridge election results 1900-2024

=== Performance of political parties in graphical format ===
This table shows parties' election performance in this seat in graphical format. Cells are shaded by party. The percentage share of the vote that each party gained is indicated by the number in each cell and is also proportional to the height of each cell. The winning party in each election is indicated by a percentage score in bold and by a shaded cell (corresponding to that party's colour) above the header row.

Socialist Alliance Respect Independent Green Labour SDP Liberal Democrats Liberal Conservative Referendum UKIP Brexit ProLife Alliance National Front

64	66	67	70	74	74	76	79	83	87	92	97	01	05	10	15	17	19	24
**43**	43	**52**	**55**	**40**	**41**		**46**	**42**	**40**	39					5	16		12
**43**	43	**52**	**55**	**40**	**41**		**46**	**42**	**40**	39			17		5	16		12
**43**	43	**52**	**55**	**40**	**41**	**51**	**46**	**42**	**40**	39		23	17	26	5	16	16	12
**43**	43	**52**	**55**	**40**	**41**	**51**	**46**	**42**	**40**	39	26	23	17	26	5	16	16	12
**43**	43	**52**	**55**	**40**	**41**	**51**	**46**	**42**	**40**	39	26	23	17	26	16	16	16	12
**43**	43	**52**	**55**	**40**	**41**	**51**	**46**	**42**	**40**	39	26	23	17	26	16	16	16	20
**43**	43	**52**	**55**	**40**	**41**	**51**	**46**	**42**	**40**	39	26	23	17	26	16	30	16	20
**43**	43	**52**	**55**	**40**	**41**	**51**	**46**	**42**	**40**	39	26	23	**44**	26	16	30	30	20
**43**	43	**52**	**55**	**40**	**41**	**51**	**46**	**42**	**40**	39	26	23	**44**	26	35	30	30	20
**43**	43	**52**	**55**	**40**	**41**	**51**	**46**	**42**	**40**	39	26	25	**44**	26	35	30	30	20
**43**	43	**52**	**55**	**40**	**41**	**51**	**46**	**42**	**40**	39	26	25	**44**	**39**	35	30	30	20
**43**	43	**52**	**55**	**40**	**41**	**51**	**46**	**42**	**40**	39	16	25	**44**	**39**	35	30	30	20
**43**	43	**52**	**55**	**40**	**41**	**51**	**46**	**42**	**40**	39	16	25	**44**	**39**	35	30	30	**47**
**43**	43	**52**	**55**	**40**	**41**	**51**	**46**	**42**	**40**	20	16	25	**44**	**39**	35	30	30	**47**
**43**	43	**52**	**55**	26	**41**	**51**	**46**	**42**	31	20	16	25	**44**	**39**	35	30	30	**47**
**43**	43	**52**	**55**	26	21	**51**	**46**	**42**	31	20	16	25	**44**	**39**	35	30	30	**47**
**43**	43	**52**	**55**	26	21	**51**	**46**	30	31	20	16	25	**44**	**39**	35	30	30	**47**
16	10	**52**	**55**	26	21	**51**	**46**	30	31	20	16	25	**44**	**39**	35	30	30	**47**
16	10	**52**	**55**	26	21	**51**	17	30	31	20	**53**	25	**44**	**39**	35	**52**	30	**47**
16	10	**52**	**55**	26	21	**51**	17	30	31	20	**53**	25	**44**	**39**	35	**52**	**48**	**47**
16	10	**52**	**55**	26	21	**51**	17	30	31	20	**53**	**45**	**44**	**39**	35	**52**	**48**	**47**
16	10	12	**55**	26	21	**51**	17	30	31	20	**53**	**45**	**44**	**39**	35	**52**	**48**	**47**
16	**45**	12	**55**	26	21	18	17	30	31	20	**53**	**45**	**44**	**39**	35	**52**	**48**	**47**
16	**45**	12	45	26	21	18	17	30	31	20	**53**	**45**	**44**	**39**	35	**52**	**48**	**47**
16	**45**	12	45	26	21	18	17	30	31	20	**53**	**45**	**44**	**39**	**36**	**52**	**48**	**47**
40	**45**	12	45	26	21	18	17	30	31	**40**	**53**	**45**	**44**	**39**	**36**	**52**	**48**	**47**
40	**45**	12	45	26	36	18	17	30	31	**40**	**53**	**45**	34	**39**	**36**	**52**	**48**	**47**
40	**45**	12	45	26	36	18	37	30	31	**40**	**53**	**45**	34	**39**	**36**	**52**	**48**	**47**
40	**45**	36	45	26	36	18	37	30	31	**40**	**53**	**45**	34	**39**	**36**	**52**	**48**	**47**
40	**45**	36	45	33	36	18	37	30	31	**40**	**53**	**45**	34	**39**	**36**	**52**	**48**	**47**
40	**45**	36	45	33	36	18	37	30	31	**40**	**53**	**45**	34	24	**36**	**52**	**48**	**47**
40	**45**	36	45	33	36	26	37	30	28	**40**	**53**	**45**	34	24	**36**	**52**	**48**	**47**
40	**45**	36	45	33	36	26	37	28	28	**40**	**53**	**45**	34	24	**36**	**52**	**48**	**47**
40	**45**	36	45	33	36	26	37	28	28	**40**	**53**	**45**	34	24	**36**	**52**	**48**	16
40	**45**	36	45	33	36	26	37	28	28	**40**	**53**	**45**	34	8	**36**	**52**	**48**	16
40	**45**	36	45	33	36	26	37	28	28	**40**	**53**	**45**	34	8	8	**52**	**48**	16

=== Elections in the 2020s ===
General election 2024: Cambridge
Party	Candidate	Votes	%	±%
**Labour**	**Daniel Zeichner**	**19,614**	**46.6**	**−0.8**
Liberal Democrats	Cheney Payne	8,536	20.3	−10.9
Green	Sarah Nicmanis	6,842	16.3	+12.1
Conservative	Shane Manning	5,073	12.0	−2.8
Workers Party	Khalid Abu-Tayyem	951	2.3	N/A
Independent	David Carmona	819	1.9	N/A
Rebooting Democracy	Keith Garrett	265	0.6	+0.5
Majority		11,078	26.3	+8.3
Turnout		42,100	60.4	−8.2
Registered electors		70,315		
Labour **hold**		Swing	▲5.1	

=== Elections in the 2010s ===
2019 notional result
Party	Vote	%
Labour	23,600	47.4
Liberal Democrats	15,501	31.2
Conservative	7,344	14.8
Green	2,068	4.2
Brexit Party	958	1.9
Others	269	0.5
**Turnout**	49,740	68.6
**Electorate**	72,560	

General election 2019: Cambridge
Party	Candidate	Votes	%	±%
**Labour**	**Daniel Zeichner**	**25,776**	**48.0**	**–3.9**
Liberal Democrats	Rod Cantrill	16,137	30.0	+0.7
Conservative	Russell Perrin	8,342	15.5	–0.8
Green	Jeremy Caddick	2,164	4.0	+1.7
Brexit Party	Peter Dawe	1,041	1.9	N/A
Independent	Miles Hurley	111	0.2	N/A
SDP	Jane Robins	91	0.2	N/A
Rebooting Democracy	Keith Garrett	67	0.1	–0.1
Majority		9,639	18.0	–4.6
Turnout		53,729	67.4	–3.8
Labour **hold**		Swing	–2.3	

General election 2017: Cambridge
Party	Candidate	Votes	%	±%
**Labour**	**Daniel Zeichner**	**29,032**	**51.9**	**+15.9**
Liberal Democrats	Julian Huppert	16,371	29.3	–5.6
Conservative	John Hayward	9,133	16.3	+0.6
Green	Stuart Tuckwood	1,265	2.3	–5.6
Rebooting Democracy	Keith Garrett	133	0.2	–0.2
Majority		12,661	22.6	+21.5
Turnout		55,934	71.2	+9.1
Labour **hold**		Swing	+10.7	

General election 2015: Cambridge
Party	Candidate	Votes	%	±%
**Labour**	**Daniel Zeichner**	**18,646**	**36.0**	**+11.7**
Liberal Democrats	Julian Huppert	18,047	34.9	–4.2
Conservative	Chamali Fernando	8,117	15.7	–9.9
Green	Rupert Read	4,109	7.9	+0.3
UKIP	Patrick O'Flynn	2,668	5.2	+2.8
Rebooting Democracy	Keith Garrett	187	0.4	N/A
Majority		599	1.1	N/A
Turnout		51,774	62.1	–2.9
Labour **gain** from Liberal Democrats		Swing	+8.0	

General election 2010: Cambridge
Party	Candidate	Votes	%	±%
**Liberal Democrats**	**Julian Huppert**	**19,621**	**39.1**	**–5.6**
Conservative	Nick Hillman	12,829	25.6	+8.3
Labour	Daniel Zeichner	12,174	24.3	–9.7
Green	Tony Juniper	3,804	7.6	+4.7
UKIP	Peter Burkinshaw	1,195	2.4	+1.0
Cambridge Socialists	Martin Booth	362	0.7	N/A
Independent	Old Holborn (Robert Ambridge) (Note: Old Holborn is the name of a popular libertarian blog, and the author of the blog stood for election under the name of his blog, rather than his own name.)	145	0.3	N/A
Majority		6,792	13.5	–13.9
Turnout		50,130	65.0	+6.1
Liberal Democrats **hold**		Swing	–7.0	

=== Elections in the 2000s ===
General election 2005: Cambridge
Party	Candidate	Votes	%	±%
**Liberal Democrats**	**David Howarth**	**19,152**	**44.0**	**+18.9**
Labour	Anne Campbell	14,813	34.0	–11.1
Conservative	Ian Lyon	7,193	16.5	–6.4
Green	Martin Lucas-Smith	1,245	2.9	–0.4
UKIP	Helene Davies	569	1.3	+0.1
Respect	Tom Woodcock	477	1.1	N/A
Independent	Suzon Forscey-Moore	60	0.1	N/A
Independent	Graham Wilkinson	60	0.1	N/A
Majority		4,339	10.0	N/A
Turnout		43,569	62.1	+1.5
Liberal Democrats **gain** from Labour		Swing	+15.0	

General election 2001: Cambridge
Party	Candidate	Votes	%	±%
**Labour**	**Anne Campbell**	**19,316**	**45.1**	**–8.3**
Liberal Democrats	David Howarth	10,737	25.1	+9.0
Conservative	Graham Stuart	9,829	22.9	–3.0
Green	Stephen Lawrence	1,413	3.3	+2.0
Socialist Alliance	Howard Senter	716	1.7	N/A
UKIP	Len Baynes	532	1.2	N/A
ProLife Alliance	Clare Underwood	232	0.5	+0.1
Workers Revolutionary	Margaret Courtney	61	0.1	–0.1
Majority		8,579	20.0	–7.5
Turnout		42,836	60.6	–10.9
Labour **hold**		Swing	–8.6	

=== Elections in the 1990s ===
General election 1997: Cambridge
Party	Candidate	Votes	%	±%
**Labour**	**Anne Campbell**	**27,436**	**53.4**	**+13.7**
Conservative	David Platt	13,299	25.9	–12.6
Liberal Democrats	Geoffrey Heathcock	8,287	16.1	–3.8
Referendum	William Burrows	1,262	2.5	N/A
Green	Margaret Wright	654	1.3	–0.1
ProLife Alliance	Anna Johnstone	191	0.4	N/A
Workers Revolutionary	Raymond Athow	107	0.2	N/A
Natural Law	M. Gladwin	103	0.2	N/A
Majority		14,137	27.5	+26.3
Turnout		51,339	71.5	–1.7
Labour **hold**		Swing	+13.2	

General election 1992: Cambridge
Party	Candidate	Votes	%	±%
**Labour**	**Anne Campbell**	**20,039**	**39.7**	**+11.4**
Conservative	Mark Bishop	19,459	38.5	–1.5
Liberal Democrats	David Howarth	10,037	19.9	–10.7
Green	Tim Cooper	720	1.4	+0.3
Monster Raving Loony	Richard Brettell-Winnington	175	0.3	N/A
Natural Law	Roger Chalmers	83	0.2	N/A
Majority		580	1.2	N/A
Turnout		50,513	73.2	–4.8
Labour **gain** from Conservative		Swing	+6.4	

=== Elections in the 1980s ===
General election 1987: Cambridge
Party	Candidate	Votes	%	±%
**Conservative**	**Robert Rhodes James**	**21,624**	**40.0**	**–1.5**
SDP	Shirley Williams	16,564	30.6	+0.9
Labour	Christopher Howard	15,319	28.3	+0.1
Green	Margaret Wright	597	1.1	N/A
Majority		5,060	9.4	–2.4
Turnout		54,104	78.0	+2.8
Conservative **hold**		Swing	–1.2	

General election 1983: Cambridge
Party	Candidate	Votes	%	±%
**Conservative**	**Robert Rhodes James**	**20,931**	**41.5**	**–1.5**
SDP	Matthew Oakeshott	14,963	29.7	+12.6
Labour	Janet Jones	14,240	28.2	–11.2
Monster Raving Loony	John Dougrez-Lewis	286	0.57	N/A
Majority		5,968	11.84	
Turnout		50,420	75.23	
Conservative **hold**		Swing		

=== Elections in the 1970s ===
2010s – 2000s – 1990s – 1980s – 1970s – 1960s – 1950s – 1940s – 1930s – 1920s – 1910s – 1900s – 1890s – 1880s – 1870s – 1860s– 1850s– 1840s– 1830s– 1820s– 1810s– 1800s– 1790s– 1780s– 1770s– 1760s– 1750s– Back to Top

General election 1979: Cambridge
Party	Candidate	Votes	%	±%
**Conservative**	**Robert Rhodes James**	**25,568**	**45.7**	**+4.4**
Labour	Martin Smith	20,772	37.14	+1.1
Liberal	John Wakelin	9,285	16.6	–4.5
National Front	Derek Holland	311	0.56	N/A
Majority		4,796	8.6	+3.4
Turnout		55,936	72.0	+2.4
Conservative **hold**		Swing	+1.7	

By-election 1976: Cambridge
Party	Candidate	Votes	%	±%
**Conservative**	**Robert Rhodes James**	**19,620**	**51.0**	**+9.8**
Labour	Martin Smith	9,995	26.0	–10.0
Liberal	Michael O'Loughlin	7,051	18.3	–2.8
Independent	James Sharpe	711	1.85	N/A
National Front	Jeremy Wotherspoon	700	1.82	N/A
Science Fiction Looney	Philip Sargent	374	1.0	N/A
Majority		9,625	25.0	+19.8
Turnout		38,451		
Conservative **hold**		Swing		

General election October 1974: Cambridge
Party	Candidate	Votes	%	±%
**Conservative**	**David Lane**	**21,790**	**41.3**	**+0.7**
Labour	James Patrick Curran	19,017	36.0	+3.3
Liberal	Michael Wilfrid Bryan O'Loughlin	11,129	21.1	–5.0
United Democratic Party	Christopher John Curry	885	1.7	N/A
Majority		2,773	5.25	–2.62
Turnout		52,821	69.56	–9.22
Conservative **hold**		Swing	–1.3	

General election February 1974: Cambridge
Party	Candidate	Votes	%	±%
**Conservative**	**David Lane**	**24,119**	**40.6**	
Labour	James Patrick Curran	19,443	32.7	
Liberal	Michael Wilfrid Bryan O'Loughlin	15,491	26.07	
Independent	Susan Elisabeth Inkster	369	0.62	N/A
Majority		4,676	7.87	
Turnout		59,422	78.74	
Conservative **hold**		Swing		

General election 1970: Cambridge
Party	Candidate	Votes	%	±%
**Conservative**	**David Lane**	**26,252**	**55.33**	**+11.91**
Labour	George Scurfield	21,191	44.67	−0.80
Majority		5,061	10.66	N/A
Turnout		47,443	72.37	−7.63
Registered electors		65,554		
Conservative **gain** from Labour		Swing	+6.36	

=== Elections in the 1960s ===
2010s – 2000s – 1990s – 1980s – 1970s – 1960s – 1950s – 1940s – 1930s – 1920s – 1910s – 1900s – 1890s – 1880s – 1870s – 1860s– 1850s– 1840s– 1830s– 1820s– 1810s– 1800s– 1790s– 1780s– 1770s– 1760s– 1750s– Back to Top

1967 Cambridge by-election, 21 September 1967
Party	Candidate	Votes	%	±%
**Conservative**	**David Lane**	**20,488**	**51.61**	**+8.19**
Labour	George Scurfield	14,510	36.55	−8.92
Liberal	David Spreckley	4,701	11.84	+1.64
Majority		5,978	15.06	N/A
Turnout		39,699	65.7	–14.30
Conservative **gain** from Labour		Swing		

General election 1966: Cambridge
Party	Candidate	Votes	%	±%
**Labour**	**Robert Davies**	**21,963**	**45.47**	**+5.01**
Conservative	David Lane	20,972	43.42	+0.05
Liberal	Michael WB O'Loughlin	4,928	10.20	−5.97
Independent	Peter King	439	0.91	N/A
Majority		991	2.05	N/A
Turnout		48,302	80.00	+0.86
Registered electors		60,380		
Labour **gain** from Conservative		Swing	+2.48	

General election 1964: Cambridge
Party	Candidate	Votes	%	±%
**Conservative**	**Hamilton Kerr**	**20,720**	**43.37**	**−7.69**
Labour	Robert Davies	19,331	40.46	+3.67
Liberal	Michael WB O'Loughlin	7,723	16.17	+4.02
Majority		1,389	2.91	−11.36
Turnout		47,774	79.14	−0.67
Registered electors		60,365		
Conservative **hold**		Swing	−5.68	

=== Elections in the 1950s ===
2010s – 2000s – 1990s – 1980s – 1970s – 1960s – 1950s – 1940s – 1930s – 1920s – 1910s – 1900s – 1890s – 1880s – 1870s – 1860s– 1850s– 1840s– 1830s– 1820s– 1810s– 1800s– 1790s– 1780s– 1770s– 1760s– 1750s– Back to Top

General election 1959: Cambridge
Party	Candidate	Votes	%	±%
**Conservative**	**Hamilton Kerr**	**24,350**	**51.06**	**−6.50**
Labour	Robert Davies	17,543	36.79	−5.65
Liberal	Arnold Geoffroy de Montmorency	5,792	12.15	−10.29
Majority		6,807	14.27	−0.85
Turnout		59,745	79.81	+1.28
Registered electors		59,745		
Conservative **hold**		Swing	−0.43	

General election 1955: Cambridge
Party	Candidate	Votes	%	±%
**Conservative**	**Hamilton Kerr**	**27,059**	**57.56**	**+5.17**
Labour	Arthur Symonds	19,953	42.44	+1.25
Majority		7,106	15.12	+3.93
Turnout		47,012	78.53	−5.91
Registered electors		59,868		
Conservative **hold**		Swing	+1.96	

General election 1951: Cambridge
Party	Candidate	Votes	%	±%
**Conservative**	**Hamilton Kerr**	**26,570**	**52.39**	**+2.88**
Labour	Arthur Symonds	20,893	41.19	+1.24
Liberal	Frances Josephy	3,257	6.42	−4.12
Majority		5,677	11.20	+1.64
Turnout		50,720	84.44	−2.04
Registered electors		60,064		
Conservative **hold**		Swing	+0.82	

General election 1950: Cambridge
Party	Candidate	Votes	%	±%
**Conservative**	**Hamilton Kerr**	**25,151**	**49.51**	**+0.39**
Labour	Arthur Symonds	20,297	39.95	−10.93
Liberal	Frances Josephy	5,355	10.54	N/A
Majority		4,854	9.56	N/A
Turnout		50,803	86.48	+17.32
Registered electors		58,742		
Conservative **gain** from Labour		Swing	+5.66	

=== Elections in the 1940s ===
2010s – 2000s – 1990s – 1980s – 1970s – 1960s – 1950s – 1940s – 1930s – 1920s – 1910s – 1900s – 1890s – 1880s – 1870s – 1860s– 1850s– 1840s– 1830s– 1820s– 1810s– 1800s– 1790s– 1780s– 1770s– 1760s– 1750s– Back to Top

General election 1945: Cambridge
Party	Candidate	Votes	%	±%
**Labour**	**Arthur Symonds**	**19,671**	**50.88**	**+9.36**
Conservative	Richard Tufnell	18,989	49.12	−9.36
Majority		682	1.76	N/A
Turnout		38,600	69.16	−4.06
Registered electors		55,898		
Labour **gain** from Conservative		Swing	+9.36	

=== Elections in the 1930s ===
2010s – 2000s – 1990s – 1980s – 1970s – 1960s – 1950s – 1940s – 1930s – 1920s – 1910s – 1900s – 1890s – 1880s – 1870s – 1860s– 1850s– 1840s– 1830s– 1820s– 1810s– 1800s– 1790s– 1780s– 1770s– 1760s– 1750s– Back to Top

General election 1935: Cambridge
Party	Candidate	Votes	%	±%
**Conservative**	**Richard Tufnell**	**18,927**	**58.48**	**−14.71**
Labour	Alexander Wood	13,436	41.52	+14.71
Majority		5,491	16.96	−29.42
Turnout		32,363	73.22	−2.40
Registered electors		44,197		
Conservative **hold**		Swing	−14.71	

General election 1931: Cambridge
Party	Candidate	Votes	%	±%
**Conservative**	**George Newton**	**23,347**	**73.19**	**+30.00**
Labour	Alexander Wood	8,552	26.81	−4.70
Majority		14,795	46.38	+34.70
Turnout		31,899	75.62	−4.19
Registered electors		42,186		
Conservative **hold**		Swing	+17.35	

=== Elections in the 1920s ===
2010s – 2000s – 1990s – 1980s – 1970s – 1960s – 1950s – 1940s – 1930s – 1920s – 1910s – 1900s – 1890s – 1880s – 1870s – 1860s– 1850s– 1840s– 1830s– 1820s– 1810s– 1800s– 1790s– 1780s– 1770s– 1760s– 1750s– Back to Top

General election 1929: Cambridge
Party	Candidate	Votes	%	±%
**Conservative**	**George Newton**	**13,867**	**43.19**	**−9.33**
Labour	David Hardman	10,116	31.51	+12.09
Liberal	Maurice Amos	8,124	25.30	−2.75
Majority		3,751	11.68	−2.20
Turnout		32,107	79.81	−2.04
Registered electors		40,227		
Conservative **hold**		Swing	−4.87	

General election 1924: Cambridge
Party	Candidate	Votes	%	±%
**Conservative**	**George Newton**	**12,628**	**52.52**	**+10.59**
Labour	Alec Firth	6,744	28.05	−5.50
Liberal	Frank Reyner Salter	4,670	19.42	−5.11
Majority		5,884	13.87	+5.49
Turnout		24,042	81.85	+0.91
Registered electors		29,372		
Conservative **hold**		Swing	+8.05	

General election 1923: Cambridge
Party	Candidate	Votes	%	±%
**Conservative**	**George Newton**	**9,814**	**41.93**	**−6.82**
Liberal	Sydney Cope Morgan	7,852	33.55	+3.16
Labour	Alec Firth	5,741	24.53	+3.67
Majority		1,962	8.38	−9.98
Turnout		23,407	80.94	−0.23
Registered electors		28,920		
Conservative **hold**		Swing	−4.99	

General election 1922: Cambridge
Party	Candidate	Votes	%	±%
**Conservative**	**George Newton**	**11,238**	**48.75**	**−26.65**
Liberal	Sydney Cope Morgan	7,005	30.39	+5.69
Labour	Alec Firth	4,810	20.86	−3.84
Majority		4,233	18.36	−32.24
Turnout		23,053	81.17	+20.22
Registered electors		28,402		
Conservative **hold**		Swing	−16.17	

By-election, 1922: Cambridge
Party	Candidate	Votes	%	±%
**Conservative**	**George Newton**	**10,897**	**48.69**	**−26.61**
Labour	Hugh Dalton	6,954	31.07	+6.37
Liberal	Sydney Cope Morgan	4,529	20.24	N/A
Majority		3,943	17.62	−32.98
Turnout		22,380	80.41	+19.46
Registered electors		27,833		
Conservative **hold**		Swing	−28.84	

=== Elections in the 1910s ===
2010s – 2000s – 1990s – 1980s – 1970s – 1960s – 1950s – 1940s – 1930s – 1920s – 1910s – 1900s – 1890s – 1880s – 1870s – 1860s– 1850s– 1840s– 1830s– 1820s– 1810s– 1800s– 1790s– 1780s– 1770s– 1760s– 1750s– Back to Top

General election 1918: Cambridge
Party		Candidate	Votes	%	±%
**C**	**Unionist**	**Eric Geddes**	**11,553**	**75.30**	**N/A**
	Labour	Thomas Rhondda Williams	3,789	24.70	N/A
Majority			7,764	50.60	N/A
Turnout			15,342	60.95	N/A
Registered electors			25,170		
	Unionist **hold**		Swing		
**C** indicates candidate endorsed by the coalition government.

By-election, 1917: Cambridge
Party	Candidate	Votes	%	±%
**Unionist**	**Eric Geddes**	**Unopposed**		
Unionist **hold**				

General election December 1910: Cambridge
Party	Candidate	Votes	%	±%
**Conservative**	**Almeric Paget**	**4,427**	**52.0**	**−1.4**
Liberal	Stanley Buckmaster	4,084	48.0	+1.4
Majority		343	4.0	−2.8
Turnout		8,511	90.6	−2.5
Registered electors		9,392		
Conservative **hold**		Swing	−1.4	

General election January 1910: Cambridge
Party	Candidate	Votes	%	±%
**Conservative**	**Almeric Paget**	**4,667**	**53.4**	**+5.3**
Liberal	Stanley Buckmaster	4,080	46.6	−5.3
Majority		587	6.8	N/A
Turnout		8,747	93.1	+0.9
Registered electors		9,392		
Conservative **gain** from Liberal		Swing	+5.3	

=== Elections in the 1900s ===
2010s – 2000s – 1990s – 1980s – 1970s – 1960s – 1950s – 1940s – 1930s – 1920s – 1910s – 1900s – 1890s – 1880s – 1870s – 1860s– 1850s– 1840s– 1830s– 1820s– 1810s– 1800s– 1790s– 1780s– 1770s– 1760s– 1750s– Back to Top

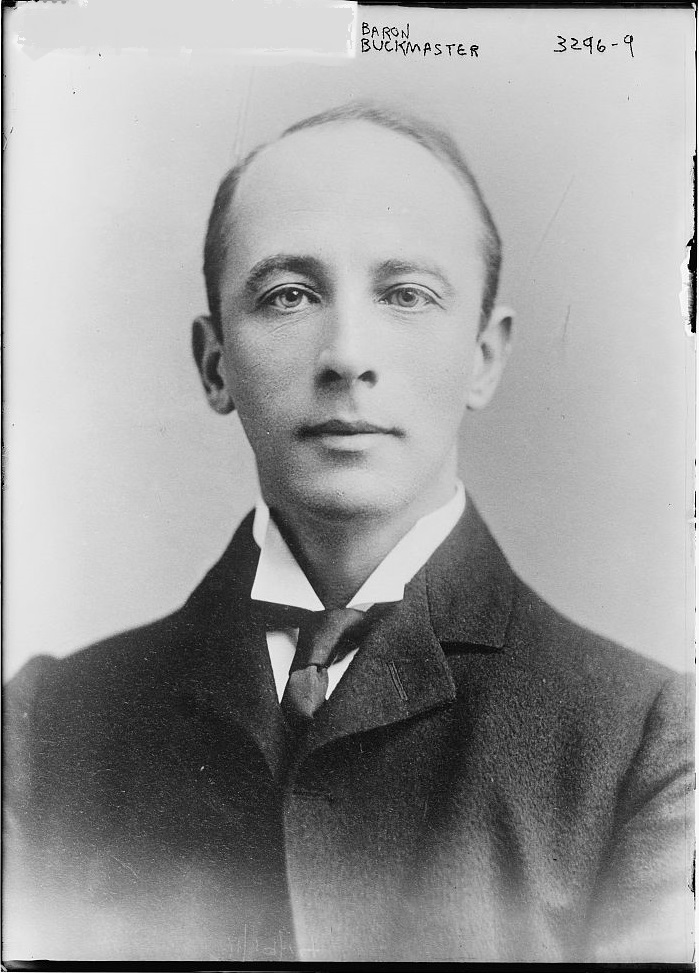
Buckmaster

General election 1906: Cambridge
Party	Candidate	Votes	%	±%
**Liberal**	**Stanley Buckmaster**	**4,232**	**51.9**	**N/A**
Conservative	Almeric Paget	3,924	48.1	N/A
Majority		308	3.8	N/A
Turnout		8,156	92.2	N/A
Registered electors		8,850		
Liberal **gain** from Conservative		Swing	N/A	

General election 1900: Cambridge
Party	Candidate	Votes	%	±%
**Conservative**	**Robert Uniacke-Penrose-Fitzgerald**	**Unopposed**		
Conservative **hold**				

=== Elections in the 1890s ===
2010s – 2000s – 1990s – 1980s – 1970s – 1960s – 1950s – 1940s – 1930s – 1920s – 1910s – 1900s – 1890s – 1880s – 1870s – 1860s– 1850s– 1840s– 1830s– 1820s– 1810s– 1800s– 1790s– 1780s– 1770s– 1760s– 1750s– Back to Top

General election 1895: Cambridge
Party	Candidate	Votes	%	±%
**Conservative**	**Robert Uniacke-Penrose-Fitzgerald**	**3,574**	**55.0**	**+3.0**
Liberal	Alexander Jones David	2,920	45.0	−3.0
Majority		654	10.0	+6.0
Turnout		6,494	83.3	−2.9
Registered electors		7,796		
Conservative **hold**		Swing	+3.0	

General election 1892: Cambridge
Party	Candidate	Votes	%	±%
**Conservative**	**Robert Uniacke-Penrose-Fitzgerald**	**3,299**	**52.0**	**−2.2**
Liberal	R. C. Lehmann	3,044	48.0	+2.2
Majority		255	4.0	−4.4
Turnout		6,343	86.2	−1.3
Registered electors		7,362		
Conservative **hold**		Swing	−2.2	

=== Elections in the 1880s ===
2010s – 2000s – 1990s – 1980s – 1970s – 1960s – 1950s – 1940s – 1930s – 1920s – 1910s – 1900s – 1890s – 1880s – 1870s – 1860s– 1850s– 1840s– 1830s– 1820s– 1810s– 1800s– 1790s– 1780s– 1770s– 1760s– 1750s– Back to Top

General election 1886: Cambridge
Party	Candidate	Votes	%	±%
**Conservative**	**Robert Uniacke-Penrose-Fitzgerald**	**2,937**	**54.2**	**+3.2**
Liberal	Cyril Dodd	2,479	45.8	−3.2
Majority		458	8.4	+6.4
Turnout		5,416	87.5	−2.7
Registered electors		6,189		
Conservative **hold**		Swing	+3.2	

Fowler

General election 1885: Cambridge
Party	Candidate	Votes	%	±%
**Conservative**	**Robert Uniacke-Penrose-Fitzgerald**	**2,846**	**51.0**	**+5.7**
Liberal	William Fowler	2,739	49.0	−5.7
Majority		107	2.0	N/A
Turnout		5,585	90.2	+0.6 (est)
Registered electors		6,189		
Conservative **win**				

General election 1880: Cambridge (2 seats)
Party	Candidate	Votes	%	±%
**Liberal**	**William Fowler**	**2,386**	**27.7**	**+2.9**
**Liberal**	**Hugh Shield**	**2,326**	**27.0**	**+2.7**
Conservative	Alfred Marten	2,003	23.2	−2.7
Conservative	Patrick Smollett	1,902	22.1	−2.9
Majority		484	5.6	N/A
Turnout		4,309 (est)	89.6 (est)	+8.7
Registered electors		4,806		
Liberal **gain** from Conservative		Swing	+2.8	
Liberal **gain** from Conservative		Swing	+2.8	

=== Elections in the 1870s ===
2010s – 2000s – 1990s – 1980s – 1970s – 1960s – 1950s – 1940s – 1930s – 1920s – 1910s – 1900s – 1890s – 1880s – 1870s – 1860s– 1850s– 1840s– 1830s– 1820s– 1810s– 1800s– 1790s– 1780s– 1770s– 1760s– 1750s– Back to Top

General election 1874: Cambridge (2 seats)
Party	Candidate	Votes	%	±%
**Conservative**	**Alfred Marten**	**1,856**	**25.9**	**+4.0**
**Conservative**	**Patrick Smollett**	**1,794**	**25.0**	**+3.8**
Liberal	William Fowler	1,774	24.8	−3.5
Liberal	Robert Torrens	1,738	24.3	−4.3
Majority		56	0.7	N/A
Turnout		3,581 (est)	80.9 (est)	−1.1
Registered electors		4,428		
Conservative **gain** from Liberal		Swing	+4.0	
Conservative **gain** from Liberal		Swing	+3.9	

=== Elections in the 1860s ===
2010s – 2000s – 1990s – 1980s – 1970s – 1960s – 1950s – 1940s – 1930s – 1920s – 1910s – 1900s – 1890s – 1880s – 1870s – 1860s– 1850s– 1840s– 1830s– 1820s– 1810s– 1800s– 1790s– 1780s– 1770s– 1760s– 1750s– Back to Top

General election 1868: Cambridge (2 seats)
Party	Candidate	Votes	%	±%
**Liberal**	**Robert Torrens**	**1,879**	**28.6**	**+4.2**
**Liberal**	**William Fowler**	**1,857**	**28.3**	**+3.9**
Conservative	Francis Powell	1,436	21.9	−3.7
Conservative	John Eldon Gorst	1,389	21.2	−4.4
Majority		443	6.7	N/A
Turnout		3,281 (est)	82.0 (est)	−2.0
Registered electors		4,000		
Liberal **gain** from Conservative		Swing	+4.0	
Liberal **gain** from Conservative		Swing	+4.2	

Cambridge by-election, 24 April 1866: Cambridge
Party	Candidate	Votes	%	±%
**Conservative**	**John Eldon Gorst**	**774**	**50.6**	**−0.6**
Liberal	Robert Torrens	755	49.4	+0.6
Majority		19	1.2	0.0
Turnout		1,529	86.4	+2.4
Registered electors		1,769		
Conservative **hold**		Swing	−0.6	

Election of William Forsyth declared void on petition, due to his holding an office of profit under the Crown.

General election 1865: Cambridge (2 seats)
Party	Candidate	Votes	%	±%
**Conservative**	**William Forsyth**	**762**	**25.6**	**−0.8**
**Conservative**	**Francis Powell**	**760**	**25.6**	**−0.7**
Liberal	Robert Torrens	726	24.4	+0.5
Liberal	William Dougal Christie	725	24.4	+1.0
Majority		34	1.2	−1.2
Turnout		1,487 (est)	84.0 (est)	+4.6
Registered electors		1,769		
Conservative **hold**		Swing	−0.8	
Conservative **hold**		Swing	−0.7	

Cambridge by-election, 12 February 1863: Cambridge
Party	Candidate	Votes	%	±%
**Conservative**	**Francis Powell**	**708**	**53.0**	**+0.3**
Liberal	Henry Fawcett	627	47.0	−0.3
Majority		81	6.0	+3.6
Turnout		1,335	72.9	−6.5
Registered electors		1,831		
Conservative **hold**		Swing	+0.3	

Resignation of Andrew Steuart.

=== Elections in the 1850s ===
2010s – 2000s – 1990s – 1980s – 1970s – 1960s – 1950s – 1940s – 1930s – 1920s – 1910s – 1900s – 1890s – 1880s – 1870s – 1860s– 1850s– 1840s– 1830s– 1820s– 1810s– 1800s– 1790s– 1780s– 1770s– 1760s– 1750s– Back to Top

General election 1859: Cambridge (2 seats)
Party	Candidate	Votes	%	±%
**Conservative**	**Kenneth Macaulay**	**753**	**26.4**	**+0.2**
**Conservative**	**Andrew Steuart**	**750**	**26.3**	**+1.3**
Liberal	Edward Twisleton	683	23.9	−0.9
Liberal	Francis Mowatt	669	23.4	−0.5
Majority		67	2.4	+2.2
Turnout		1,428 (est)	79.4 (est)	+1.2
Registered electors		1,797		
Conservative **hold**		Swing	+0.5	
Conservative **hold**		Swing	+1.0	

General election 1857: Cambridge (2 seats)
Party	Candidate	Votes	%	±%
**Conservative**	**Kenneth Macaulay**	**770**	**26.2**	**−0.9**
**Conservative**	**Andrew Steuart**	**735**	**25.0**	**−1.5**
Radical	Robert Adair	729	24.8	+0.5
Radical	J. T. Hibbert	702	23.9	+1.7
Majority		6	0.2	−2.6
Turnout		1,468 (est)	78.2 (est)	+1.7
Registered electors		1,878		
Conservative **hold**		Swing	−1.0	
Conservative **hold**		Swing	−1.3	

Cambridge by-election, 18 August 1854: Cambridge
Party	Candidate	Votes	%	±%
**Radical**	**Robert Adair**	**758**	**26.2**	**+1.9**
**Radical**	**Francis Mowatt**	**733**	**25.3**	**+3.1**
Conservative	George Finch-Hatton	708	24.5	−2.6
Conservative	Sir Frederic William Slade, 2nd Baronet	696	24.0	−2.5
Majority		50	1.7	N/A
Turnout		1,448 (est)	73.2 (est)	−3.3
Registered electors		1,977		
Radical **gain** from Conservative		Swing	+2.2	
Radical **gain** from Conservative		Swing	+2.8	

Previous election declared void on petition, due to bribery and treating.

General election 1852: Cambridge (2 seats)
Party	Candidate	Votes	%	±%
**Conservative**	**Kenneth Macaulay**	**821**	**27.1**	**+15.5**
**Conservative**	**John Harvey Astell**	**803**	**26.5**	**+14.9**
Whig	Robert Adair	737	24.3	−52.5
Radical	Francis Mowatt	673	22.2	N/A
Majority		84	2.8	N/A
Turnout		1,517 (est)	76.5 (est)	+9.2
Registered electors		1,984		
Conservative **gain** from Whig		Swing	+20.9	
Conservative **gain** from Whig		Swing	+20.6	

=== Elections in the 1840s ===
2010s – 2000s – 1990s – 1980s – 1970s – 1960s – 1950s – 1940s – 1930s – 1920s – 1910s – 1900s – 1890s – 1880s – 1870s – 1860s– 1850s– 1840s– 1830s– 1820s– 1810s– 1800s– 1790s– 1780s– 1770s– 1760s– 1750s– Back to Top

General election 1847: Cambridge (2 seats)
Party	Candidate	Votes	%	±%
**Whig**	**Robert Adair**	**811**	**40.5**	**+16.0**
**Whig**	**William Campbell**	**727**	**36.3**	**+13.1**
Conservative	John Manners-Sutton	465	23.2	−29.1
Majority		262	13.1	N/A
Turnout		1,234 (est)	67.3 (est)	−6.4
Registered electors		1,834		
Whig **gain** from Conservative		Swing	+15.3	
Whig **gain** from Conservative		Swing	+13.8	

By-election, 16 July 1845: Cambridge
Party	Candidate	Votes	%	±%
**Conservative**	**Fitzroy Kelly**	**746**	**50.6**	**−1.7**
Whig	Robert Adair	729	49.4	+1.7
Majority		17	1.2	+0.2
Turnout		1,475	77.5	+3.8
Registered electors		1,904		
Conservative **hold**		Swing	−1.7	

By-election triggered by the appointment of Fitzroy Kelly as Solicitor-General of England and Wales

By-election, 21 March 1843: Cambridge
Party	Candidate	Votes	%	±%
**Conservative**	**Fitzroy Kelly**	**713**	**51.2**	**−1.1**
Whig	Richard Foster	680	48.8	+1.1
Majority		33	2.4	+1.4
Turnout		1,393	73.2	−0.5
Registered electors		1,904		
Conservative **hold**		Swing	−1.1	

By-election triggered by the resignation of Sir Alexander Cray Grant, Bt. by accepting the office of Steward of the Manor of Poynings

General election 1841: Cambridge (2 seats)
Party	Candidate	Votes	%	±%
**Conservative**	**John Manners-Sutton**	**758**	**26.8**	**+3.0**
**Conservative**	**Alexander Grant**	**722**	**25.5**	**+2.3**
Whig	Richard Foster	695	24.5	−2.2
Whig	Cosmo Russell	656	23.2	−3.1
Majority		27	1.0	N/A
Turnout		1,430	73.7	−2.7
Registered electors		1,940		
Conservative **gain** from Whig		Swing	+2.9	
Conservative **gain** from Whig		Swing	+2.5	

By-election, 23 May 1840: Cambridge
Party	Candidate	Votes	%	±%
**Conservative**	**Alexander Grant**	**736**	**52.8**	**+5.8**
Whig	Thomas Starkie	657	47.2	−5.8
Majority		79	5.6	N/A
Turnout		1,393	75.0	−1.4
Registered electors		1,857		
Conservative **gain** from Whig		Swing	+5.8	

Previous by-election declared void on petition due to bribery and treating by Manners-Sutton's agents.

=== Elections in the 1830s ===
2010s – 2000s – 1990s – 1980s – 1970s – 1960s – 1950s – 1940s – 1930s – 1920s – 1910s – 1900s – 1890s – 1880s – 1870s – 1860s– 1850s– 1840s– 1830s– 1820s– 1810s– 1800s– 1790s– 1780s– 1770s– 1760s– 1750s– Back to Top

By-election, 6 September 1839: Cambridge
Party	Candidate	Votes	%	±%
**Conservative**	**John Manners-Sutton**	**717**	**53.7**	**+6.7**
Whig	Thomas Milner Gibson	617	46.3	−6.7
Majority		100	7.4	N/A
Turnout		1,334	78.6	+2.2
Registered electors		1,698		
Conservative **gain** from Whig		Swing	+6.7	

By-election triggered by the elevation to the peerage of Thomas Spring Rice as Lord Monteagle of Brandon.

General election 1837: Cambridge (2 seats)
Party	Candidate	Votes	%	±%
**Whig**	**Thomas Spring Rice**	**690**	**26.7**	**−8.1**
**Whig**	**George Pryme**	**678**	**26.3**	**−6.4**
Conservative	James Knight	614	23.8	+7.6
Conservative	John Manners-Sutton	599	23.2	+7.0
Majority		64	2.5	+2.3
Turnout		1,298	76.4	−14.1
Registered electors		1,698		
Whig **hold**		Swing	−7.7	
Whig **hold**		Swing	−6.9	

By-election, 27 April 1835: Cambridge
Party	Candidate	Votes	%	±%
**Whig**	**Thomas Spring Rice**	**Unopposed**		
Whig **hold**				

By-election triggered by the appointment of Thomas Spring Rice as Chancellor of the Exchequer.

General election 1835: Cambridge (2 seats)
Party	Candidate	Votes	%	±%
**Whig**	**Thomas Spring Rice**	**736**	**34.8**	**−9.1**
**Whig**	**George Pryme**	**693**	**32.7**	**+0.9**
Conservative	James Knight	688	32.5	+8.3
Majority		5	0.2	−7.4
Turnout		1,341	90.5	+7.3
Registered electors		1,482		
Whig **hold**		Swing	−6.6	
Whig **hold**		Swing	−1.6	

By-election, 13 June 1834: Cambridge
Party	Candidate	Votes	%	±%
**Whig**	**Thomas Spring Rice**	**615**	**51.0**	**−24.7**
Tory	Edward Sugden	590	49.0	+24.8
Majority		25	2.0	−5.6
Turnout		1,205	82.8	−0.4
Registered electors		1,456		
Whig **hold**		Swing	−24.8	

By-election triggered by the appointment of Thomas Spring Rice as Secretary of State for War and the Colonies.

General election 1832: Cambridge (2 seats)
Party	Candidate	Votes	%	±%
**Whig**	**Thomas Spring Rice**	**979**	**43.9**	**N/A**
**Whig**	**George Pryme**	**709**	**31.8**	**N/A**
Tory	Edward Sugden	540	24.2	N/A
Majority		169	7.6	N/A
Turnout		1,247	83.2	N/A
Registered electors		1,499		
Whig **gain** from Tory		Swing	N/A	
Whig **gain** from Tory		Swing	N/A	

General election 1831: Cambridge (2 seats)
Party	Candidate	Votes	%	±%
**Tory**	**James Graham**	**Unopposed**		
**Tory**	**Frederick Trench**	**Unopposed**		
Registered electors		c. 160		
Tory **hold**				
Tory **hold**				

General election 1830: Cambridge (2 seats)
Party	Candidate	Votes	%	±%
**Tory**	**James Graham**	**Unopposed**		
**Tory**	**Frederick Trench**	**Unopposed**		
Registered electors		c. 160		
Tory **hold**				
Tory **hold**				

=== Elections in the 1820s ===
2010s – 2000s – 1990s – 1980s – 1970s – 1960s – 1950s – 1940s – 1930s – 1920s – 1910s – 1900s – 1890s – 1880s – 1870s – 1860s– 1850s– 1840s– 1830s– 1820s– 1810s– 1800s– 1790s– 1780s– 1770s– 1760s– 1750s– Back to Top

General election 1820: Cambridge (2 seats)
Party	Candidate	Votes	%	±%
**Tory**	**Frederick Trench**	**37**		
**Tory**	**Charles Cheere**	**37**		
Whig	Henry John Adeane	18		
Whig	George Pryme	16		
Majority		19		
Majority		19		
Registered electors		c.160		
Tory **hold**		Swing		
Tory **hold**		Swing		

By-election triggered by the death of Charles Madryl Cheere.

Cambridge by-election, 4 February 1825: Cambridge (1 seat)
Party	Candidate	Votes	%	±%
**Tory**	**James Graham**	**Unopposed**	**N/A**	**N/A**
Majority		N/A	N/A	N/A
Registered electors		c.160		
Tory **hold**				

General election 1826: Cambridge (2 seats)
Party	Candidate	Votes	%	±%
**Tory**	**James Graham**	**24**		
**Tory**	**Frederick Trench**	**23**		
Whig	George Pryme	4		
Majority		20		
Majority		19		
Registered electors		c.160		
Tory **hold**		Swing		
Tory **hold**		Swing		

By-election triggered by the appointment of the Marquess of Graham as Commander of the Board of Control.

Cambridge by-election, 8 February 1828: Cambridge (1 seat)
Party	Candidate	Votes	%	±%
**Tory**	**James Graham**	**Unopposed**	**N/A**	**N/A**
Majority		N/A	N/A	N/A
Registered electors		c.160		
Tory **hold**				

By-election triggered by the appointment of Frederick William Trench as Storekeeper of Ordnance.

Cambridge by-election, 9 June 1829: Cambridge (1 seat)
Party	Candidate	Votes	%	±%
**Tory**	**Frederick Trench**	**Unopposed**	**N/A**	**N/A**
Majority		N/A	N/A	N/A
Registered electors		c.160		
Tory **hold**				

=== Elections in the 1810s ===
2010s – 2000s – 1990s – 1980s – 1970s – 1960s – 1950s – 1940s – 1930s – 1920s – 1910s – 1900s – 1890s – 1880s – 1870s – 1860s– 1850s– 1840s– 1830s– 1820s– 1810s– 1800s– 1790s– 1780s– 1770s– 1760s– 1750s– Back to Top

General election 1812: Cambridge (2 seats)
Party	Candidate	Votes	%	±%
**Tory**	**Edward Finch**	**Unopposed**	**N/A**	
**Tory**	**Robert Manners**	**Unopposed**	**N/A**	
Majority		N/A	N/A	N/A
Majority		N/A	N/A	N/A
Registered electors		c.150		
Tory **hold**				
Tory **hold**				

General election 1818: Cambridge (2 seats)
Party	Candidate	Votes	%	±%
**Tory**	**Edward Finch**	**76**		**N/A**
**Tory**	**Robert Manners**	**76**		**N/A**
Whig	Henry John Adeane	56		N/A
Majority		20		N/A
Majority		20		N/A
Registered electors		c.150		
Tory **hold**		Swing	N/A	
Tory **hold**		Swing	N/A	

By-election triggered by the resignation of the Hon. Edward Finch.

Cambridge by-election, 3 December 1819
Party	Candidate	Votes	%	±%
**Tory**	**Frederick Trench**	**Unopposed**	**N/A**	**N/A**
Majority		N/A	N/A	N/A
Registered electors		c.150		
Tory **hold**				

=== Elections in the 1800s ===
2010s – 2000s – 1990s – 1980s – 1970s – 1960s – 1950s – 1940s – 1930s – 1920s – 1910s – 1900s – 1890s – 1880s – 1870s – 1860s– 1850s– 1840s– 1830s– 1820s– 1810s– 1800s– 1790s– 1780s– 1770s– 1760s– 1750s– Back to Top

By-election triggered by the appointment of Robert Manners as First Equerry and Clerk Marshal of the Mews.

Cambridge by-election, 9 February 1801
Party	Candidate	Votes	%	±%
**Tory**	**Robert Manners**	**Unopposed**	**N/A**	**N/A**
Majority		N/A	N/A	N/A
Registered electors		c.150		
Tory **hold**				

General election 1802: Cambridge (2 seats)
Party	Candidate	Votes	%	±%
**Tory**	**Edward Finch**	**Unopposed**	**N/A**	
**Tory**	**Robert Manners**	**Unopposed**	**N/A**	
Majority		N/A	N/A	N/A
Majority		N/A	N/A	N/A
Registered electors		c.150		
Tory **hold**				
Tory **hold**				

General election 1806: Cambridge (2 seats)
Party	Candidate	Votes	%	±%
**Tory**	**Edward Finch**	**Unopposed**	**N/A**	
**Tory**	**Robert Manners**	**Unopposed**	**N/A**	
Majority		N/A	N/A	N/A
Majority		N/A	N/A	N/A
Registered electors		c.150		
Tory **hold**				
Tory **hold**				

General election 1807: Cambridge (2 seats)
Party	Candidate	Votes	%	±%
**Tory**	**Edward Finch**	**Unopposed**	**N/A**	
**Tory**	**Robert Manners**	**Unopposed**	**N/A**	
Majority		N/A	N/A	N/A
Majority		N/A	N/A	N/A
Registered electors		c.150		
Tory **hold**				
Tory **hold**				

=== Elections in the 1790s ===
2010s – 2000s – 1990s – 1980s – 1970s – 1960s – 1950s – 1940s – 1930s – 1920s – 1910s – 1900s – 1890s – 1880s – 1870s – 1860s– 1850s– 1840s– 1830s– 1820s– 1810s– 1800s– 1790s– 1780s– 1770s– 1760s– 1750s– Back to Top

General election 1790: Cambridge (2 seats)
Party	Candidate	Votes	%	±%
Tory	**Edward Finch**	Unopposed	N/A	
Tory	**Francis Dickins**	Unopposed	N/A	
Majority		N/A	N/A	N/A
Majority		N/A	N/A	N/A
Registered electors		c.150		
Tory **hold**		Swing	N/A	
Tory **hold**		Swing	N/A	

By-election triggered by the simultaneous election of Francis Dickins for Northamptonshire, and his decision to sit for that constituency instead of Cambridge.

Cambridge by-election, 12 February 1791
Party	Candidate	Votes	%	±%
Tory	**Robert Manners**	Unopposed	N/A	N/A
Majority		N/A	N/A	N/A
Registered electors		c.150		
Tory **hold**		Swing		

General election 1796: Cambridge (2 seats)
Party	Candidate	Votes	%	±%
Tory	**Edward Finch**	Unopposed	N/A	
Tory	**Robert Manners**	Unopposed	N/A	
Majority		N/A	N/A	N/A
Majority		N/A	N/A	N/A
Registered electors		c.150		
Tory **hold**		Swing	N/A	
Tory **hold**		Swing	N/A	

=== Elections in the 1780s ===
2010s – 2000s – 1990s – 1980s – 1970s – 1960s – 1950s – 1940s – 1930s – 1920s – 1910s – 1900s – 1890s – 1880s – 1870s – 1860s– 1850s– 1840s– 1830s– 1820s– 1810s– 1800s– 1790s– 1780s– 1770s– 1760s– 1750s– Back to Top

General election 1780: Cambridge (2 Seats)
Party	Candidate	Votes	%	±%
Tory	**James Whorwood Adeane**	96		
Nonpartisan	**Benjamin Keene**	83		
Whig	Christopher Potter	18		
Majority		78		
Majority		65		
Registered electors		c.150		
Tory **hold**		Swing		
Nonpartisan **hold**		Swing		

General election 1784: Cambridge (2 Seats)
Party	Candidate	Votes	%	±%
Tory	**James Whorwood Adeane**	Unopposed	N/A	N/A
Tory	**John Mortlock**	Unopposed	N/A	N/A
Majority		N/A	N/A	N/A
Majority		N/A	N/A	N/A
Registered electors		c.150		
Tory **hold**		Swing		
Tory **gain** from Nonpartisan		Swing	N/A	

By-election triggered by the appointment of John Mortlock to office.

Cambridge by-election, 29 May 1788
Party	Candidate	Votes	%	±%
Tory	**Francis Dickins**	41		
Whig	Thomas Adams	7		
Majority		34		
Registered electors		c.150		
Tory **hold**		Swing		

By-election triggered by the appointment of James Whorwood Adeane to office.

Cambridge by-election, 11 May 1789
Party	Candidate	Votes	%	±%
Tory	**Edward Finch**	Unopposed	N/A	N/A
Majority		N/A	N/A	N/A
Registered electors		c.150		
Tory **hold**		Swing		

=== Elections in the 1770s ===
2010s – 2000s – 1990s – 1980s – 1970s – 1960s – 1950s – 1940s – 1930s – 1920s – 1910s – 1900s – 1890s – 1880s – 1870s – 1860s– 1850s– 1840s– 1830s– 1820s– 1810s– 1800s– 1790s– 1780s– 1770s– 1760s– 1750s– Back to Top

General election 1774: Cambridge (2 Seats)
Party	Candidate	Votes	%	±%
Tory	**Soame Jenyns**	92		
Whig	**Charles Cadogan**	89		
Whig	Thomas Byde	63		
Nonpartisan	Samuel Meeke	60		
Majority		29		
Majority		26		
Registered electors		c.150		
Tory **hold**		Swing		
Whig **hold**		Swing		

By-election triggered by the elevation to the peerage of Charles Sloane Cadogan.

Cambridge by-election, 7 November 1776
Party	Candidate	Votes	%	±%
Nonpartisan	**Benjamin Keene**	101		
Whig	Thomas Byde	34		
Majority		67		
Registered electors		c.150		
Nonpartisan **hold**		Swing		

=== Elections in the 1760s ===
2010s – 2000s – 1990s – 1980s – 1970s – 1960s – 1950s – 1940s – 1930s – 1920s – 1910s – 1900s – 1890s – 1880s – 1870s – 1860s– 1850s– 1840s– 1830s– 1820s– 1810s– 1800s– 1790s– 1780s– 1770s– 1760s– 1750s– Back to Top

General election 1761: Cambridge (2 Seats)
Party	Candidate	Votes	%	±%
Tory	**Soame Jenyns**	Unopposed	N/A	N/A
Whig	**Charles Cadogan**	Unopposed	N/A	N/A
Majority		N/A	N/A	N/A
Majority		N/A	N/A	N/A
Registered electors		c.150		
Tory **gain** from Whig		Swing	N/A	
Whig **hold**		Swing		

By-election triggered by the appointment of Charles Sloane Cadogan to office.

Cambridge by-election, 23 April 1764
Party	Candidate	Votes	%	±%
Whig	**Charles Cadogan**	Unopposed	N/A	N/A
Majority		N/A	N/A	N/A
Registered electors		c.150		
Whig **hold**		Swing		

General election 1768: Cambridge (2 Seats)
Party	Candidate	Votes	%	±%
Tory	**Soame Jenyns**	Unopposed	N/A	N/A
Whig	**Charles Cadogan**	Unopposed	N/A	N/A
Majority		N/A	N/A	N/A
Majority		N/A	N/A	N/A
Registered electors		c.150		
Tory **hold**		Swing		
Whig **hold**		Swing		

By-election triggered by the appointment of Charles Sloane Cadogan to office.

Cambridge by-election, 15 May 1769
Party	Candidate	Votes	%	±%
Whig	**Charles Cadogan**	Unopposed	N/A	N/A
Majority		N/A	N/A	N/A
Registered electors		c.150		
Whig **hold**		Swing		

=== Elections in the 1750s ===
2010s – 2000s – 1990s – 1980s – 1970s – 1960s – 1950s – 1940s – 1930s – 1920s – 1910s – 1900s – 1890s – 1880s – 1870s – 1860s– 1850s– 1840s– 1830s– 1820s– 1810s– 1800s– 1790s– 1780s– 1770s– 1760s– 1750s– Back to Top

General election 1754: Cambridge (2 Seats)
Party	Candidate	Votes	%	±%
Whig	**Thomas Hay**	Unopposed	N/A	N/A
Whig	**Thomas Bromley**	Unopposed	N/A	N/A
Majority		N/A	N/A	N/A
Majority		N/A	N/A	N/A
Registered electors		c.150		
Whig **hold**		Swing		
Whig **hold**		Swing		

By-election triggered by the succession to the peerage of Thomas Bromley.

Cambridge by-election, 13 January 1755
Party	Candidate	Votes	%	±%
Whig	**Charles Cadogan**	Unopposed	N/A	N/A
Majority		N/A	N/A	N/A
Registered electors		c.150		
Whig **hold**		Swing		

By-election triggered by the appointment of Thomas Hay, Viscount Dupplin, to office.

Cambridge by-election, 22 December 1755
Party	Candidate	Votes	%	±%
Whig	**Thomas Hay**	Unopposed	N/A	N/A
Majority		N/A	N/A	N/A
Registered electors		c.150		
Whig **hold**		Swing		

By-election triggered by the appointment of Thomas Hay, Viscount Dupplin, to office.

Cambridge by-election, 31 January 1758
Party	Candidate	Votes	%	±%
Whig	**Thomas Hay**	Unopposed	N/A	N/A
Majority		N/A	N/A	N/A
Registered electors		c.150		
Whig **hold**		Swing		

By-election triggered by the succession to the peerage Thomas Hay, Viscount Dupplin.

Cambridge by-election, 29 November 1758
Party	Candidate	Votes	%	±%
Whig	**Charles Cadogan**	Unopposed	N/A	N/A
Majority		N/A	N/A	N/A
Registered electors		c.150		
Whig **hold**		Swing		

=== Graphical representation ===
1918
24.7%	**75.3%**
Liberal	**Conservative**

1922 by-election
31.1%	20.2%	**48.7%**
Labour	Liberal	**Conservative**

1922
20.9%	30.4%	**48.8%**
Labour	Liberal	**Conservative**

1923
24.5%	33.6%	**41.9%**
Labour	Liberal	**Conservative**

1924
19.4%	28.1%	**52.5%**
Labour	Liberal	**Conservative**

1929
31.5%	25.3%	**43.2%**
Labour	Liberal	**Conservative**

1931
26.8%	**73.2%**
Labour	**Conservative**

1935
41.5%	**58.5%**
Labour	**Conservative**

1945
**50.9%**	49.1%
**Labour**	Conservative

1950
40.0%	10.5%	**49.5%**
Labour	Liberal	**Conservative**

1951
41.2%	6.4%	**52.4%**
Labour	Liberal	**Conservative**

1955
42.4%	**57.6%**
Labour	**Conservative**

1959
36.8%	12.2%	**51.1%**
Labour	Liberal	**Conservative**

1964
40.5%	16.2%	**43.4%**
Labour	Liberal	**Conservative**

1966
**45.5%**	10.2%	43.4%
**Labour**	Liberal	Conservative

1967 by-election
36.6%	11.8%	**51.6%**
Labour	Liberal	**Conservative**

1970
44.7%	**55.3%**
Labour	**Conservative**

Feb 1974
32.7%	26.1%	**40.6%**
Labour	Liberal	**Conservative**

Oct 1974
36.0%	21.1%	1.7	**41.3%**
Labour	Liberal	UDP	**Conservative**

1976 by-election
26.0%	18.3%	1.9	**51.0%**	1.8
Labour	Liberal	Ind	**Conservative**	NF

1979
37.1%	16.6%	**45.7%**
Labour	Liberal	**Conservative**

1983
28.2%	29.7%	**41.5%**
Labour	SDP	**Conservative**

1987
1.1	28.3%	30.6%	**40.0%**
Gn	Labour	SDP	**Conservative**

1992
1.4	**39.7%**	19.9%	38.5%
Gn	**Labour**	Lib Dems	Conservative

1997
1.3	**53.4%**	16.1%	25.9%	2.5
Gn	**Labour**	Lib Dems	Conservative	Ref

2001
1.7	3.3	**45.1%**	25.1%	22.9%	1.2
SA	Gn	**Labour**	Lib Dems	Conservative	UK

2005
2.9	1.1	34.0%	**44.0%**	16.5%	1.3
Gn	Rs	Labour	**Lib Dems**	Conservative	UK

2010
7.6%	24.3%	**39.1%**	25.6%	2.4
Green	Labour	**Lib Dems**	Conservative	UK

2015
7.9%	**36.0%**	34.9%	15.7%	5.2%
Green	**Labour**	Lib Dems	Conservative	UKIP

2017
2.2	**51.9%**	29.3%	16.3%
Gn	**Labour**	Lib Dems	Conservative

2019
4.0	**48.0%**	30.0%	15.5%
Gn	**Labour**	Lib Dems	Conservative	B

== See also ==
- List of parliamentary constituencies in Cambridgeshire

== Sources ==
- "Constituencies in the unreformed House". Date of creation. Archived from the original on 7 February 2005.
