= John Erlich =

16th-century English politician

John Erlich (born by 1489–1516), of Cambridge, was an English politician.

He was a Member of Parliament (MP) for Cambridge in 1512.
