= Edward Capel =

English soldier and sportsman

General The Honourable Thomas Edward Capel
- Born: 24 March 1770
- Died: 3 February 1855 (aged 84)
- Burial place: Kensal Green Cemetery
- Education: Exeter College, Oxford
- Military career
- Allegiance: United Kingdom
- Branch: British Army
- Service years: 1793–1855
- Rank: General
- Unit: 1st Foot Guards
- Commands: General Officer Commanding, Cádiz
- Conflicts: French Revolutionary Wars; Flanders Campaign; Napoleonic Wars; Peninsular War; Battle of Corunna; Siege of Cádiz; Siege of Tarifa
- Awards: Military General Service Medal

General Thomas Edward Capel (24 March 1770 – 3 February 1855) was a British Army officer and sportsman.

Thomas Edward Capel was the son of William Capel, 4th Earl of Essex, by his second wife, Harriet Bladen, and the elder brother of Rev. William Robert Capel (1775–1854). He was educated at Exeter College, Oxford, where he graduated with a BA in 1790, and was subsequently a Fellow of Merton College, Oxford.

As a cricketer, Capel was mainly associated with Marylebone Cricket Club (MCC). He made 3 known appearances in the 1790 season.

Capel served in the Flanders Campaign of the late 1790s. On 2 March 1795, Capel was appointed a Gentleman Usher of the Privy Chamber. In the same year, he was commissioned lieutenant and captain in the 1st Foot Guards, and became captain and lieutenant-colonel in 1803. Capel was promoted from a Gentleman Usher to a Groom of the Bedchamber on 31 October 1808, but was not immediately present at court, as he served with the 3rd Btn. of the Guards during Sir John Moore's campaign of 1808–1809 in the Peninsular War, including the Battle of Corunna. He was presented at the royal levee on 6 March 1809, after returning from A Coruña.

He was again with the Guards in the Peninsula during the siege of Cádiz, from July to September 1811; in the latter month, he was appointed assistant adjutant general, filling the post until June 1813. He was breveted colonel on 1 January 1812, resigned his Court office on 18 February 1812, and subsequently commanded the Cádiz garrison from July 1813 to April 1814. Capel was promoted major-general on 4 June 1814, lieutenant-general on 22 July 1830, and general in 1846.
