= James Whorwood Adeane =

English politician

General James Whorwood Adeane
- Born: 14 December 1740; Oxfordshire
- Died: 15 April 1802 (aged 61); Bath, Somerset
- Education: Westminster School
- Spouse: Anne Jones (m. 1763)
- Military career
- Allegiance: United Kingdom
- Branch: British Army
- Service years: 1755–1802
- Rank: General

Member of Parliament for Cambridge
- In office 1780–1789

Member of Parliament for Cambridgeshire
- In office 1789–1802

General James Whorwood Adeane (14 December 1740 – 15 April 1802) was a British Army officer and Tory politician.

He was the only son of Simon Adeane of Chalgrove and Mary Brydges, niece of James Brydges, 1st Duke of Chandos. He entered the British Army in 1755, rising to the rank of colonel of the 45th Foot in 1788, Lieut-General in 1796 and full General in 1801.

He was a Member of the Parliament of Great Britain for Cambridge 1780 to May 1789 and for Cambridgeshire 19 May 1789 – 15 April 1802. He was appointed a Groom of the Bedchamber to King George III from 1784 to his death.

He died in 1802. He had married Anne, daughter and heiress of Robert Jones, with whom he had a son Robert Jones Adeane of Babraham, Cambridgeshire (who fathered MP Henry John Adeane) and three daughters.
