= John Knapton (politician) =

Member of the Parliament of England

John Knapton (fl. 1406–1433), of Cambridge, was an English politician.

He was a Member (MP) of the Parliament of England for Cambridge in 1406, 1415, 1419 and 1431. Knapton was mayor of Cambridge from 1432 to 1433.
