= John Knapton (engineer) =

John Knapton (born 10 March 1949) was Professor of structural engineering at University of Newcastle from 1991 to 2001, and has written a number of textbooks on the subject of concrete construction. He has also worked as a consultant and expert witness in matters relating to concrete, including a report for Lloyds insurers on whether the design of the World Trade Center towers had contributed to their collapse on 9/11: he concluded that "the way they were designed and built actually prevented them from falling over and thus would have saved around 100,000 lives which would have been directly in their paths had they fallen over."

== Publications ==
- Ground bearing concrete slabs London : Telford, 2003. ISBN 0-7277-3186-6
- Single Pour Industrial Floors London : Telford, 1999. ISBN 9780727727343
- In-Situ Industrial Hardstandings London : Telford, 1999. ISBN 9780727728272
