= Brigham (surname) =

Brigham is a surname. Notable people with the surname include:

- Asa Brigham (1788–1844), Texas politician and businessman
- Albert Perry Brigham (1855–1932), American geologist and clergyman.
- Amariah Brigham (1798–1849), American psychiatrist
- Besmilr Brigham (1913–2000), American poet and writer of short stories
- Bud Brigham (born 1961), American billionaire oil and gas developer
- Carl Brigham (1890–1943), American psychologist at Princeton University, developer of the progenitor of the SAT test
- Charles Brigham (1841–1925), American architect
- Dorcas Brigham (1896–1986), American botanist, horticulturist
- Elijah Brigham Bryant (born 1995), American basketball player for Maccabi Tel Aviv of the Israeli Premier League and the EuroLeague
- Harold Brigham (1914–1978), English footballer who played for Nottingham Forest. Stoke City and York City
- Harold F. Brigham (1897–1971), American librarian
- Jeff Brigham, American baseball player
- Lincoln F. Brigham (1819–1895), American judge
- Louise Brigham (1875–1956), American designer and teacher
- Paul Brigham (1746–1824), Revolutionary soldier and American politician
- Peter Bent Brigham (1807–1877), American businessman and philanthropist
- Philip Brigham, Canadian rock singer, composer and guitarist
- Robert Brigham (disambiguation), multiple people
- William Tufts Brigham (1841–1926), American botanist and ethnologist, first director of the Bernice P. Bishop Museum (1898–1918)
