= Lincoln (name) =

Lincoln is a male given name, and according to US data based on 2024 births, about 1 in 376 people are given the name. Lincoln is also a surname and sometimes masculine given name of Old English origin. The surname originates from the city of Lincoln, England, whose name means "lake/pool colony", combining the Brythonic word lynn with the Latin word colonia. This translates to 'town by the pool' or 'settler by the lake'. It has become a somewhat prominent first name for males in the United States (#781 out of 1220, Top 6 2018).

== Family of President Abraham Lincoln ==
- Abraham Lincoln (1809–1865), the 16th United States president
- Samuel Lincoln (c. 1622 – 1690), immigrant ancestor of the president
- Abraham Lincoln (captain) (1744–1786), grandfather of the president
- Thomas Lincoln (1778–1851), father of the president
- Nancy Lincoln (1784–1818), mother of the president
- Mary Todd Lincoln (1818–1882), wife of the president
- Robert Todd Lincoln (1843–1926), son of the president
- Edward Baker Lincoln (1846–1850), son of the president
- William Wallace Lincoln (1850–1862), son of the president
- Tad Lincoln (1853–1871), son of the president
- Mary Harlan Lincoln (1846–1937), daughter-in-law of the president
- Gatewood Lincoln (1875–1957), first cousin once removed of the president and two-time governor of American Samoa

== People with the surname Lincoln ==
- Abbey Lincoln (born Anna Marie Wooldridge) (1930–2010), American jazz vocalist, songwriter, and actress
- Andrew Lincoln (born Clutterbuck) (born 1973), English actor
- Benjamin Lincoln (1733–1810), American Revolutionary War general
- Beth Lincoln (born 1992), English children's writer
- Blanche Lincoln (born 1960), Arkansas senator
- Brad Lincoln (born 1985), American baseball pitcher
- Don Lincoln (born 1964), American physicist
- Elmo Lincoln (1889–1952), American film actor
- Evelyn Lincoln (1909–1995), personal secretary to John F. Kennedy from his election to the Senate in 1953 until his 1963 assassination
- Frederic Lincoln, several people
- Georgianna Lincoln (born 1943), American politician
- G. Gould Lincoln (1880–1974), American journalist
- Harry J. Lincoln (1878–1937), American composer
- Henry Lincoln (1930–2022), British author and actor
- Holly Lincoln (born 1985), Canadian soccer forward
- James Sullivan Lincoln (1811–1888), American portrait painter
- J. Virginia Lincoln (1915–2003), American physicist
- Joseph C. Lincoln (1870–1944), American author
- Kaliya Lincoln (born 2006), American artistic gymnast
- Keith Lincoln (1939–2019), American football player
- Lar Park Lincoln (1961–2025), American actress (surname is "Park Lincoln")
- Martha D. Lincoln (1838–1911), American author and journalist
- Paul Martyn Lincoln (1870–1944), American electrical engineer
- Tribich Lincoln (1879–1943), Hungarian adventurer and con artist

== People with the given name Lincoln ==
- Link Abrams (born 1973), American-New Zealand basketball player
- Lincoln Alexander (1922–2012), Canadian lawyer and politician
- Lincoln Allison (born 1946), English academic and essayist
- Lincoln Almond (1936–2023), American politician and attorney
- Lincoln Asquith (born 1964), English sprinter
- Lincoln Bancroft (1877–1942), American politician
- Lincoln J. Beachey (1887–1915), American aviator
- Lincoln Borglum (1912–1986), American artist
- Lincoln Brewster (born 1971), Christian recording artist
- Lincoln Brower (1931–2018), American entomologist
- Lincoln Broyhill (1925–2008), American United States Army Air Force soldier
- Lincoln F. Brigham (1819–1895), American judiciary
- Lincoln Bush (1860–1940), American railroad engineer
- Lincoln Cássio de Souza Soares (born 1979), Brazilian footballer
- Lincoln Corrêa dos Santos (born 2000), Brazilian footballer
- Lincoln Chafee (born 1953), American politician
- Lincoln Davis (born 1943), American politician
- Lincoln Deal, Bahamian politician
- Lincoln Díaz-Balart (1954–2025), American politician
- Lincoln Ellsworth (1880–1951), American explorer
- Lincoln Henrique Oliveira dos Santos (born 1998), Brazilian footballer
- Lincoln Kennedy (born 1971), American footballer and broadcaster
- Lincoln Kirstein (1907–1996), American artist
- Lincoln Moses (1921–2006), American biostatistician
- Lincoln P. Bloomfield Jr. (born 1952), American diplomat
- Lincoln Pare (born 2001), American football player
- Lincoln Peirce (born 1963), American cartoonist and creator of Big Nate
- Lincoln Perera (died 2010), Sri Lankan Sinhala civil servant
- Lincoln Perry (1902–1985), American comedian and actor
- Lincoln Ragsdale (1926–1995), American civil rights activist
- Lincoln Riley (born 1983), American football coach
- Lincoln Fernando Rocha da Silva (born 1996), Brazilian footballer
- George Lincoln Rockwell, (1918–1967), American politician sometimes referred to as Lincoln Rockwell
- Lincoln Sefcik (born 1999), American football player
- Lincoln Steffens (1866–1936), American investigative journalist
- Lincoln Victor (born 2001), American football player
- Lincoln Wallen, British-American computer scientist
- Lincoln Walsh (1903–1971), American inventor
- Lincoln Williams (born 1993), Australian volleyball player
- Lincoln Withers (born 1981), Australian rugby player
- Lincoln Wolfenstein (1923–2015), American physicist
- Lincoln Younes (born 1992), Australian actor
- Lincoln Zvasiya (born 1991), Zimbabwean footballer

== Fictional characters ==
- Lincoln Burrows, a character in Prison Break
- Lincoln Loud, the main protagonist in The Loud House
