= Bohumil Shimek House =

Historic house in Iowa, United States

- U.S. National Register of Historic Places
- U.S. Historic district – Contributing property
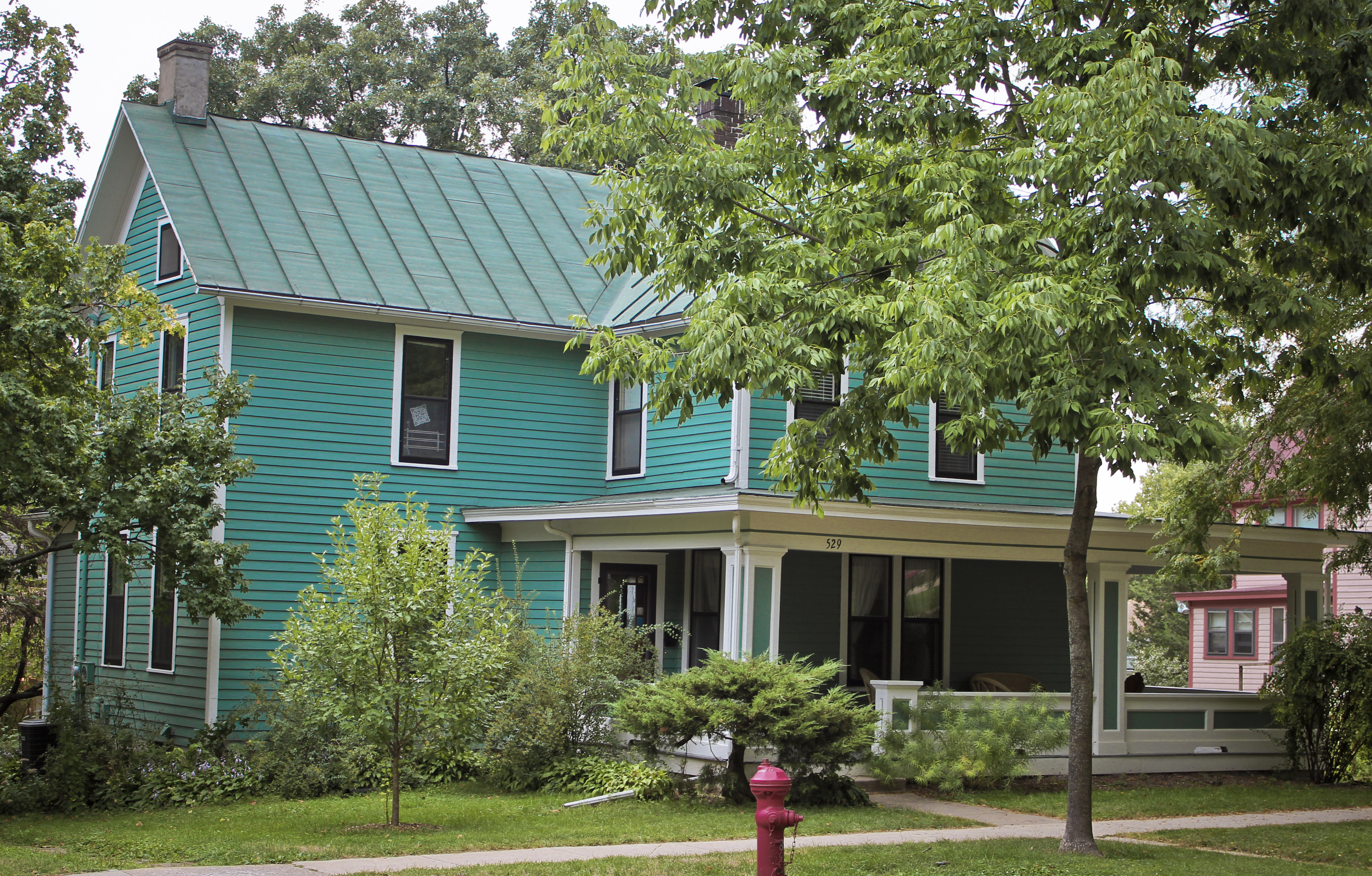

- Location within Iowa Location within the United States
- Location: 529 Brown St., Iowa City, Iowa
- Coordinates: 41°40′11.9″N 91°31′38.6″W
- Area: less than one acre
- Built: c. 1890
- Part of: Brown Street Historic District (ID94001112)
- MPS: Conservation Movement in Iowa MPS
- NRHP reference No.: 91001837
- Added to NRHP: December 23, 1991

The Bohumil Shimek House is a historic building located in Iowa City, Iowa, United States. The two-story, frame, Folk Victorian structure was built sometime around 1890. Its significance is its association with Bohumil Shimek. Initially trained as a civil engineer, he is better known as a naturalist, conservationist, and botany professor at the University of Iowa. He lived here from 1899 until his death in 1937. These dates coincide with his professional career. Shimek contributions include establishing the state park system in Iowa, the Iowa Lakeside Laboratory, the American School of Wild Life Protection, and the Upper Mississippi River National Wildlife and Fish Refuge. He published over 190 scholarly works, and is credited with the discovery of the origins of the Loess Hills.

The house was individually listed on the National Register of Historic Places in 1991. In 1994 it was included as a contributing property in the Brown Street Historic District.
