= CCK =

CCK may refer to:

== Organisations ==
- Chama Cha Kijamii, a political party in Tanzania
- Néstor Kirchner Cultural Centre (Spanish: Centro Cultural Kirchner), an institution in Argentina
- Cambridge Community Kitchen, a free meal organisation in Cambridge, UK

=== Government agencies ===
- Communications Commission of Kenya
- Constitutional Court of Korea, a constitutional court in South Korea

== Places ==
- Ching Chuan Kang Air Base, Taiwan
- Choa Chu Kang, Singapore
  - Choa Chu Kang MRT/LRT station, Singapore (station abbreviation)
- Cocos (Keeling) Islands (ISO 3166-1 country code)
  - Cocos (Keeling) Islands Airport (IATA code)

== Science and technology ==
- Cholecystokinin, a digestive hormone

=== Computing ===
- Complementary code keying, a modulation technique used in IEEE 802.11b
- Composite candidate key, a candidate key comprising more than one field
- Client Customization Kit, a set of tools to aid in distributing customized Mozilla clients, see list of Mozilla products

== People ==
- Chiang Ching-kuo (1910–1988), Taiwanese president
- Chris Kanyon (1970–2010), American wrestler

== Other uses ==
- Candy Coated Killahz a Canadian hip-hop/electronic music group
- CCK, an English professional wrestling tag team consisting of Chris Brookes and Kid Lykos
