= Jay Norwood and Genevieve Pendleton Darling House =

Historic house in Iowa, United States

- U.S. National Register of Historic Places
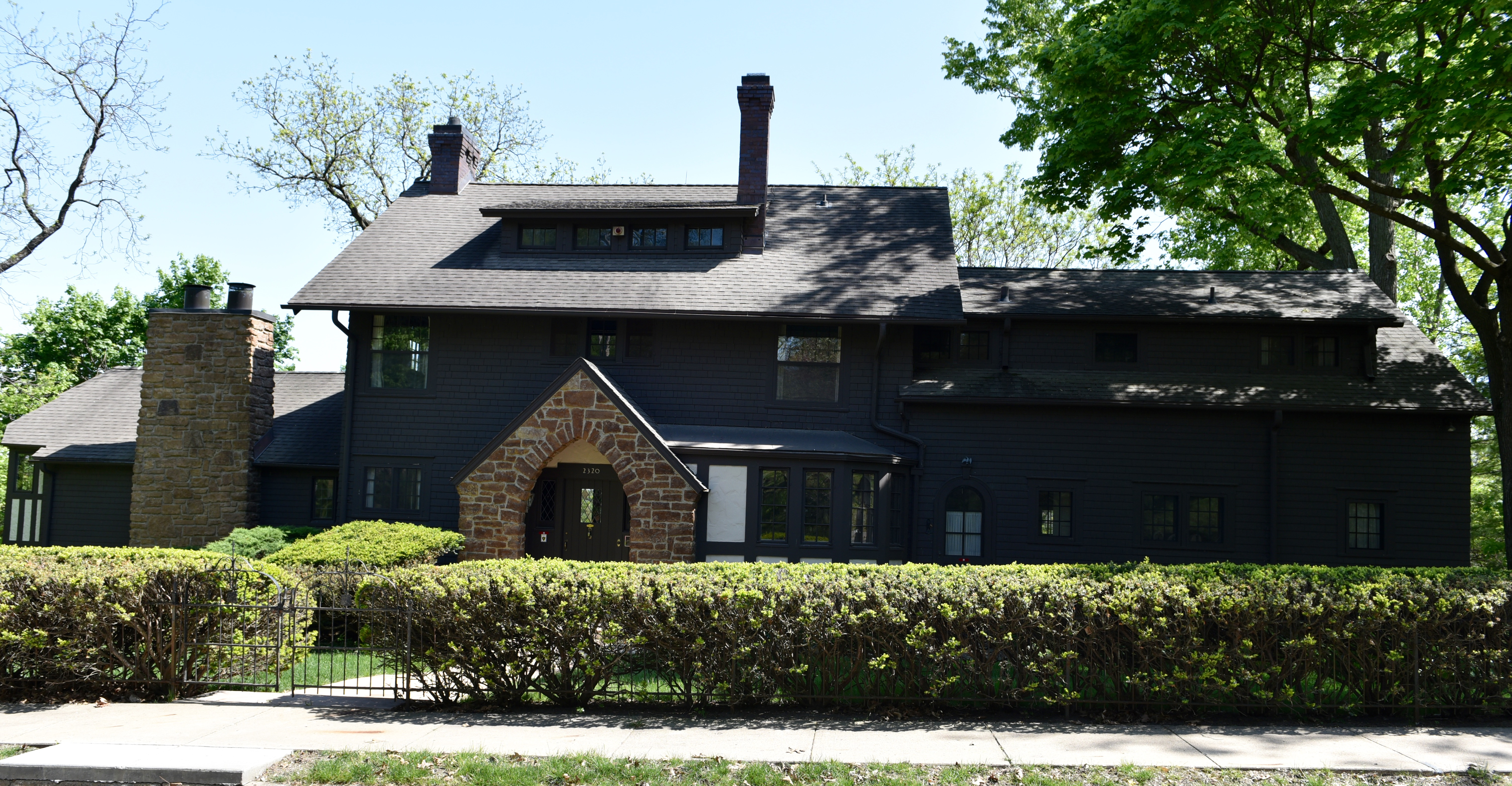

- Location within Iowa Location within the United States
- Location: 2320 Terrace Rd. Des Moines, Iowa
- Coordinates: 41°34′56″N 93°38′55.5″W
- Area: less than one acre
- Built: 1926
- Architect: Multiple
- Architectural style: Bungalow/Craftsman; Tudor Revival
- MPS: Conservation Movement in Iowa MPS
- NRHP reference No.: 91001838
- Added to NRHP: September 30, 1992

The Jay Norwood and Genevieve Pendleton Darling House is a historic building located in Des Moines, Iowa, United States. The residence was the home of cartoonist Ding Darling, who worked for The Des Moines Register and whose cartoons were syndicated in over 100 newspapers across the country. In the early 1930s, he became involved in the conservation movement, especially wildlife conservation. His advocacy was reflected in his cartoons. Part of his conservation legacy in Iowa is the Cooperative Wildlife Research Unit program that he initiated at Iowa State College and the expansion of the research facilities at Iowa Lakeside Laboratory.

The house sits behind Terrace Hill, the residence of Iowa's Governors. The Darlings did not build the house, but they did make some changes when they owned it. The original house and the first major addition was the work of two prominent Des Moines architectural firms, Hailett and Rawson and Proudfoot, Rawson & Souers. Darling had architect John W. Brooks design the east wing and main entrance. He also chose the house's dark brown color. The changes Darling made to the house mixed elegance with earthiness and allowed it to blend in with its natural surroundings. It was listed on the National Register of Historic Places in 1992 as a part of the Conservation Movement in Iowa MPS.
