= Robert Brigham =

Robert Brigham may refer to:

- Robert Brigham (died 1349), MP for Cambridge
- Robert Brigham (fl. 1377–1402), MP for Cambridge and son of the above
- Robert K. Brigham (born 1960), American historian
