= Lake Darling =

Lake Darling may refer to:

- Lake Darling (Minnesota), a lake in Douglas County
- Lake Darling (North Dakota), a lake in northwest North Dakota near Minot.
- Lake Darling Dam, a dam in North Dakota
- Lake Darling State Park, a state park in southeast Iowa near Brighton.
