= Vogt House (Iowa City, Iowa) =

Historic house in Iowa, United States

- U.S. National Register of Historic Places
- U.S. Historic district – Contributing property
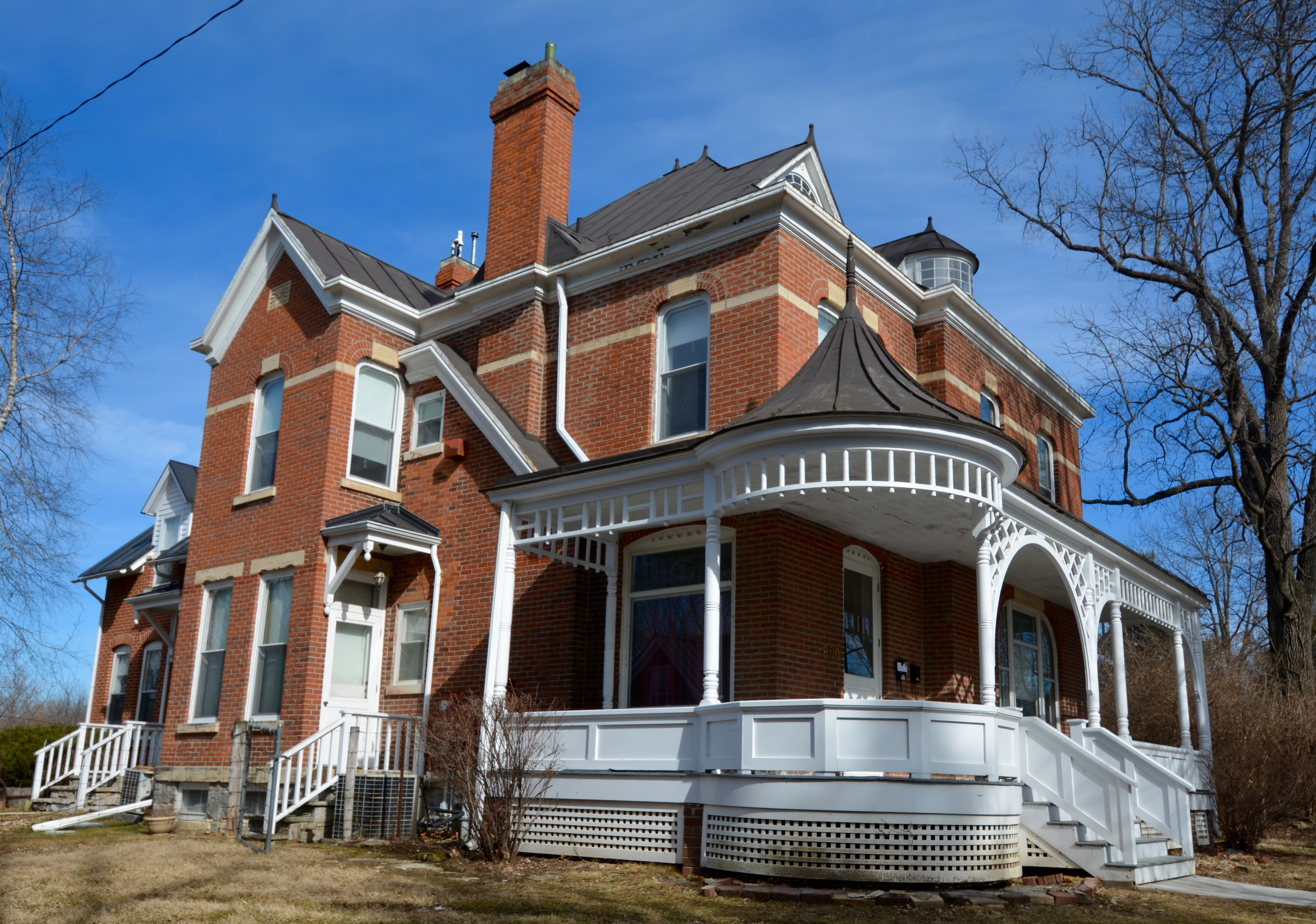

- Location within Iowa Location within the United States
- Location: 800 N. Van Buren St. Iowa City, Iowa
- Coordinates: 41°40′15.5″N 91°31′42.8″W
- Area: approximately 6 acres (2.4 ha)
- Built: 1890
- Built by: Jake Hotz
- Architectural style: Queen Anne
- Part of: Brown Street Historic District (ID94001112)
- NRHP reference No.: 78001231
- Added to NRHP: July 24, 1978

The Vogt House, also known as the Vogt-Unash House and the Kurt Vonnegut House, is a historic building located in Iowa City, Iowa, United States. The two-story, brick structure is a fine example of vernacular Queen Anne architecture. It follows an asymmetrical plan and features a high-pitched hipped roof, a gabled and a round dormer on the south elevation, a two-story gabled-roof pavilion on the east, a two-story polygonal bay with a hipped roof on the west, and a single-story addition on the back. Of particular merit is the wrap-around, latticework porch that has a round pavilion with a conical roof and finial on its southwest corner. There are also two outbuildings: a two-story frame carriage house to the west of the house, and a woodshed to the north of the main house.

Author Kurt Vonnegut lived in the house from 1965 to 1967. The house was individually listed on the National Register of Historic Places in 1978. In 1994 it was included as a contributing property in the Brown Street Historic District.
