= John Cotton (fl. 1379–1388) =

English politician

John Cotton (fl. 1379–1388) was an English politician.

He was Mayor of Cambridge from September 1376 to 1378.

He was a member (MP) of the parliament of England for Cambridge in 1379, November 1380, October 1382, February 1383, October 1383, November 1384 and February 1388.
