= List of mayors of Cambridge =

The office of the mayor of Cambridge was created following the granting of a charter by King John in 1207 to the town of Cambridge, Cambridgeshire, England. The charter gave the burgesses of the town the right to elect their own mayors in place of the provosts previously appointed by the Crown. The first recorded mayor was Hervey FitzEustace, who served in the year 1213.

== Mayors of Cambridge ==
The following have been mayors of Cambridge :

- 1213: Hervey FitzEustace, 1st recorded mayor
- 1376–78: John Cotton, MP for Cambridge 6 times between 1379 and 1388
- Sept. 1378–79, 1386–88, 1393–94, 1396–99, 1405–06: Robert Brigham
- 1391–92: John Marshall
- 1432–33: John Knapton
- 1586–87: John Edmonds, MP for Cambridge, 1586
- 1596–98: Robert Wallis, MP for Cambridge, 1597–1611
- 1599–1600: John Yaxley, MP for Cambridge, 1597–1611
- 1605–06: John Edmonds
- 1619–21: Richard Foxton, MP for Cambridge, 1621
- c.1780: John Mortlock, MP for Cambridge, 1784
- 1774: John Whittred, magistrate (1697–1778)

== 19th century ==
- 1836–37: Ebenezer Foster, co-founder of Foster's Bank
- 1837–38: Charles Humfrey, architect
- 1838–39: Henry Headly
- 1839–40: Richard Foster, co-founder of Foster's Bank
- 1840–43: George Fisher, banker (two terms)
- 1842–43: Thomas Stevwnson, bookseller
- 1843–44: Rowland M. Fawcett
- 1844–45: W. Bishop
- 1845–46: John J. Deighton, bookseller
- 1846–47: Charles E. Brown
- 1847–48: Charles F. Foster, miller, corn, coal and timber merchant
- 1848–49: Charles Finch, iron founder
- 1849–50: Henry S. Foster
- 1850–51: William Warren, grocer
- 1851–52: Elliot Smith, auctioneer and land agent
- 1852–53: Henry Hemington Harris, auditor
- 1853–54: Augustin G. Brimley, wholesale grocer and provision merchant
- 1854–55: Charles F. Foster (2nd term)
- 1855–56: William Ekin, of Ekin Brewery
- 1856–57: Patrick Beales, corn and coal merchant
- 1857–58: Swann Hurrell
- 1858–59: Charles Balls, auditor and director of Cambridge Water Company
- 1859–60: Elliot Smith (2nd term)
- 1860–62: Charles F. Foster (3rd & 4th terms)
- 1862–63: Henry Smith
- 1863–64: Henry Hemington Harris (2nd term)
- 1864–66: Swann Hurrell (2nd & 3rd terms)
- 1866–67: Patrick Beales (2nd term)
- 1867–68: Elliot Smith (3rd term)
- 1868–69: C. E. Brown
- 1869–70: Charles Balls (2nd term)
- 1870–72: Samuel Peed, solicitor (2 terms)
- 1872–73: T. H. Naylor, lawyer
- 1873–75: John Death (2 terms)
- 1875–77: Frederic Barlow, solicitor of Barlow, Palmer and Neville (2 terms)
- 1877–78: T. H. Naylor (2nd term)
- 1878–80: Henry Rance (2 terms)
- 1880–82: John Death (3rd & 4th terms)
- 1882–83: Henry Rance (3rd term)
- 1883–87: W. B. Redfarn (4 terms)
- 1887–89: Edward Bell, corn and seed merchant (died in office, replaced by F.C.Wace)
- 1889–91: F. C. Wace (2 terms)
- 1891–92: George Kett, builder
- 1892–93: Samuel L. Young, draper
- 1893–94: E. H. Parker, vice-chairman of Barclays Bank
- 1894–95: Thomas Hyde Hills, surgeon
- 1895–96: William C. Hall
- 1896–97: Horace Darwin, FRS, son of Charles. Founded Cambridge Instrument Company
- 1897–98: Samuel R. Ginn, solicitor
- 1898–99: George Kett (2nd term)
- 1899–1900: Alfred Tillyard, newspaper editor

== 20th century ==
- 1900–01: Henry Martyn Taylor, barrister
- 1901–02: George Kett (3rd term)
- 1902–03: Philip Henry Young, grocer, Liberal
- 1903–04: James H. C. Dalton, physician
- 1904–05: Algernon S. Campkin, pharmacist
- 1905–06: Sir Walter Durnford, Provost of King's College 1918–26
- 1906–07: George Stace, ladies' outfitter
- 1907–08: H. G. Whibley
- 1908–10: William P. Spalding, stationer (2 terms)
- 1910–11: George Stace (2nd term)
- 1911–12: Algernon S. Campkin
- 1912–13: Walter H. Francis, solicitor
- 1913–14: Joseph A. Sturton, pharmacist
- 1914–15: W. Luard Raynes
- 1915–16: George Turner
- 1916–17: Lt. Col. Barnet W. Beales, tailor
- 1918–19: Ralph Starr
- 1919–20: George P. Hawkins
- 1920–21: Benjamin C. Jolley
- 1921–22: George P. Hawkins (2nd term)
- 1922–23: George H. Lavender, draper
- 1923–24: Harold B. Bailey, brewer of Bailey and Tebbutt
- 1924–25: Eva Hartree, first woman Mayor of Cambridge
- 1925–26: Edward O. Brown
- 1926–27: John S. Conder
- 1927–28: Edward W. Amies
- 1928–29: John E. Purvis
- 1929–30: Harry Franklin
- 1930–31: Edwin Jackson, jeweller
- 1931–32: W. Luard Raynes (2nd term)
- 1932–33: Florence Ada Keynes, author
- 1933–34: Alexander A. Spalding
- 1934–35: Ralph Starr (2nd term)
- 1935–36: Herbert T. Wing
- 1936–37: William L. Briggs, 1st Labour mayor
- 1937–38: Ernest Saville Peck, pharmacist
- 1938–39: Alexander A. Spalding (2nd term)
- 1939–40: W. J. Wing
- 1940–41: Edward O. Brown (2nd term)
- 1941–43: Sir Montagu Butler, Governor of Central Provinces, 1925–33; Lieutenant Governor of the Isle of Man, 1933 (2 terms)
- 1943–44: William L. Briggs (2nd term)
- 1944–45: George Wilding
- 1945–46: Lady Alice Bragg, wife of Sir William Lawrence Bragg
- 1946–47: Francis Doggett, draughtsman
- 1947–49: Geoffrey F. Hickson (18 month term due to change of appointment date from November to May)
- 1949–50: William G. James, Managing Director of Coulson builders
- 1950–51: Archibald C. Taylor, Managing Director of Cambridge Daily News
- 1951–52: Henry O. Langdon
- 1952–53: Stewart T. Bull, dairy farmer
- 1953–54: Thomas H. Amey, railwayman
- 1954–55: Howard R. Mallett, librarian
- 1955–56: Edward T. Halnan, animal nutrionist
- 1956–57: C. Elliot Ridgeon of builders merchants Cyril Ridgeon and Son
- 1957–58: Bertram J. S. White, director of Joshua Taylor's departmental store
- 1958–59: Leonard D. V. Wordingham, railwayman
- 1959–60: Wallace Cole
- 1960–61: Cecil A. Mole, director of Johnson's men's outfitters
- 1961–62: Arthur Halcrow, librarian
- 1962–63: Geoffrey F. Hickson (2nd term)
- 1963–64: John B. Collins
- 1964–65: P. Jack Warren, university technician
- 1965–66: Horace G. Ives, road safety lecturer
- 1966–67: Marcus N. N. Bradford, hotelier
- 1967–68: Ernest A. Gill, insurance agent
- 1968–69: Herbert C. Finbow, director of removal firm
- 1969–70: George Dean, Cambridge University Press
- 1970–71: Brian Cooper, university lecturer in mechanical engineering
- 1971–72: Jean Barker (later Baroness Trumpington)
- 1972–73: Peter C. Wright of Dept of the Animal Physiology of Agricultural Research Council
- 1973–74: Stanley C. Bowles, engineer, Cambridge Water Company
- 1974–75: P. Jack Warren (2nd term)
- 1975–76: Robert May
- 1976–77: Robert E. Wright, confectioner
- 1977–78: Maurice J. Garner, legal executive
- 1978–79: Alec Molt
- 1979–80: Donald R. H. MacKay, managing director of Donald MacKay Engineering (Cambridge) Ltd
- 1980–81: Doris M. Howe
- 1981–82: Percy O. Reed, managing director of P.O. Reed Ltd, Hairdressers
- 1982–83: Peter J. Cowell, postman
- 1983–84: Millicent A. "Betty" Suckling
- 1984–85: Edward G. Cowell
- 1985–86: A. James Johnson, chef
- 1986–87: John Woodhouse, telecomms engineer
- 1987–88: Terry Sweeney (resigned Summer 1987 and replaced by Peter Cowell)
- 1988–89: Lavena A. D. Hawes, librarian
- 1989–90: John Woodhouse (2nd term)
- 1990–91: Dr George A. Reid, mathematics lecturer
- 1991–92: Peter Cowell (3rd term)
- 1992–93: Barry Gardiner, elected MP for Brent North in 1997
- 1993–94: Alec MacEachern, manager of Psychiatric Services, Fulbourn Hospital
- 1994–95: Joye Rosenstiel, charity administrator
- 1995–96: Sonja Froggett, medical practitioner
- 1996–97: John Durrant
- 1997–98: Daphne Roper, book seller
- 1998–99: Peter Cowell (4th term)
- 1999–2000: Richard Smith, schoolteacher

== 21st century ==
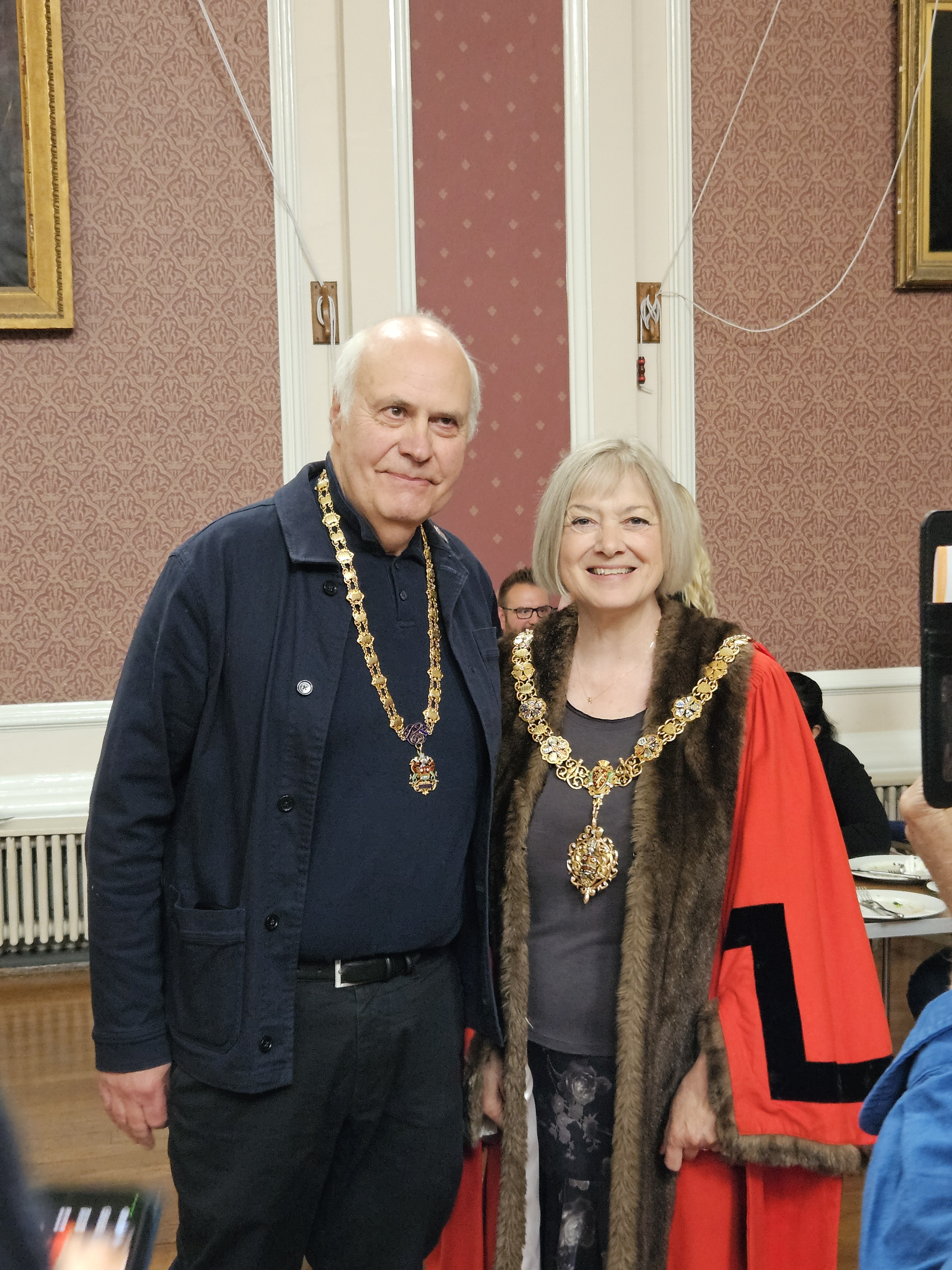
Dinah Pounds (right), on her appointment as Mayor of Cambridge on May 22nd 2025, with her husband, Adam Pounds.

- 2000–01: Evelyn Knowles
- 2001–02: Chris Lakin
- 2002–03: Philippa Slatter, teacher
- 2003–04: David White
- 2004–05: Robert Dryden
- 2005–06: John Hipkin
- 2006–07: Robert Dryden (2nd term)
- 2007–08: Jenny Bailey, telecoms engineer
- 2009–09: Mike Dixon, teacher
- 2009–10: Russ McPherson
- 2010–11: Sheila Stuart, accountant
- 2011–12: Ian Nimmo-Smith, mathematician
- 2012–13: Sheila Stuart (2nd term)
- 2013–14: Paul Saunders
- 2014–15: Gerri Bird
- 2015–16: Robert Dryden (mayor) (3rd term)
- 2016–17: Jeremy Benstead
- 2017–18: George Pippas
- 2018–19: Nigel Gawthrope (died in office and was replaced by Gerri Bird)
- 2019: Gerri Bird (2nd term)
- 2020–22: Russ McPherson (2nd term)
- 2022–23: Mark Ashton
- 2023–24: Jenny Gawthrope Wood
- 2024–25: Baiju Thittala (Cambridge’s 1st Non White Mayor)
- 2025–26: Dinah Pounds
- 2026–27: Maria Cleminson (Cambridge’s first Mayor from the Green Party)
