= John Marshall (MP for Cambridge) =

English politician

John Marshall (active 1384–1392), of Cambridge, was an English politician.

He was a Member (MP) of the Parliament of England for Cambridge in April 1384 and September 1388. He was mayor of Cambridge from September 1391 to 1392.
