= Arthur Hillyer Ford House =

Historic house in Iowa, United States

- U.S. National Register of Historic Places
- U.S. Historic district – Contributing property
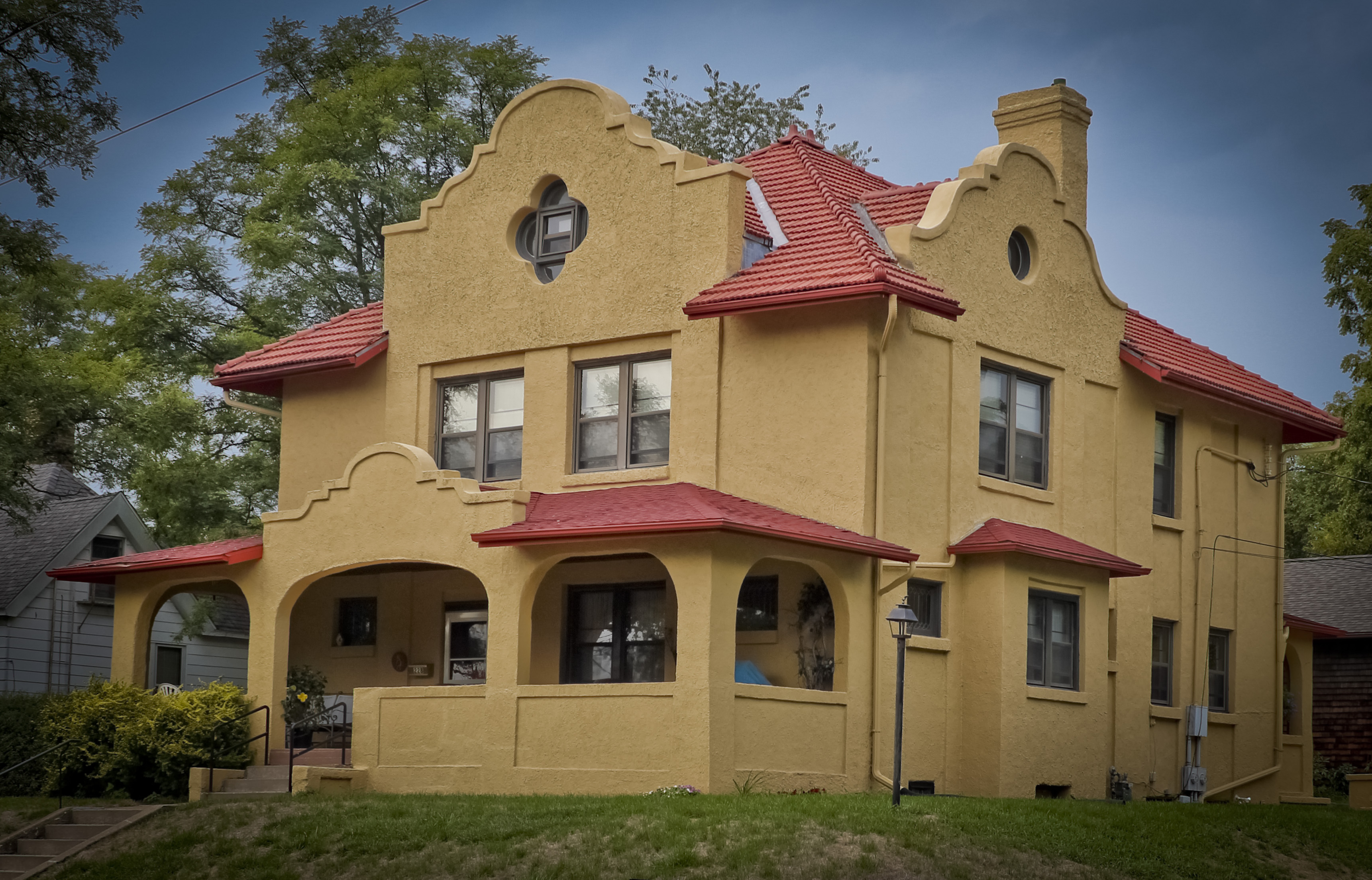

- Location within Iowa Location within the United States
- Location: 228 Brown St. Iowa City, Iowa
- Coordinates: 41°40′13.5″N 91°31′54.5″W
- Area: less than one acre
- Built: 1909
- Architect: O.H. Carpenter
- Architectural style: Mission/Spanish Revival
- Part of: Brown Street Historic District (ID94001112)
- NRHP reference No.: 86000713
- Added to NRHP: April 10, 1986

The Arthur Hillyer Ford House is a historic building located in Iowa City, Iowa, United States. Ford was a Chicago native who worked as an electrical engineer before becoming a college professor. He eventually became professor of electrical engineering at the University of Iowa, and is credited with inventing glare-less automobile headlights. He hired local architect Orville H. Carpenter to design his Mission Revival house. It features a symmetrical composition, wall dormers with scalloped parapets, a quatrefoil window, stuccoed walls, red clay tile roof with wide overhanging eaves, and a full-length front porch with square piers and flattened arches. The American Craftsman influence is found on the interior, especially in the fireplace inglenook. The house was individually listed on the National Register of Historic Places in 1986. In 1994 it was included as a contributing property in the Brown Street Historic District.
