= John Edmonds (died 1606) =

English politician

John Edmonds (died 1606), of Cambridge, was an English politician.

== Family ==
Edmonds was the son of John Edmonds, who died in 1544. He married Katherine Walsh, daughter of Roger Walsh of Thaxted, Essex. Together they had five sons and two daughters.

== Career ==
Edmonds was Mayor of Cambridge from 1586 until 1587, and again from 1605 until his death the following year.

He was a member (MP) of the parliament of England for Cambridge in 1586.
