= Charles Berryhill House =

Historic house in Iowa, United States

- U.S. National Register of Historic Places
- U.S. Historic district – Contributing property
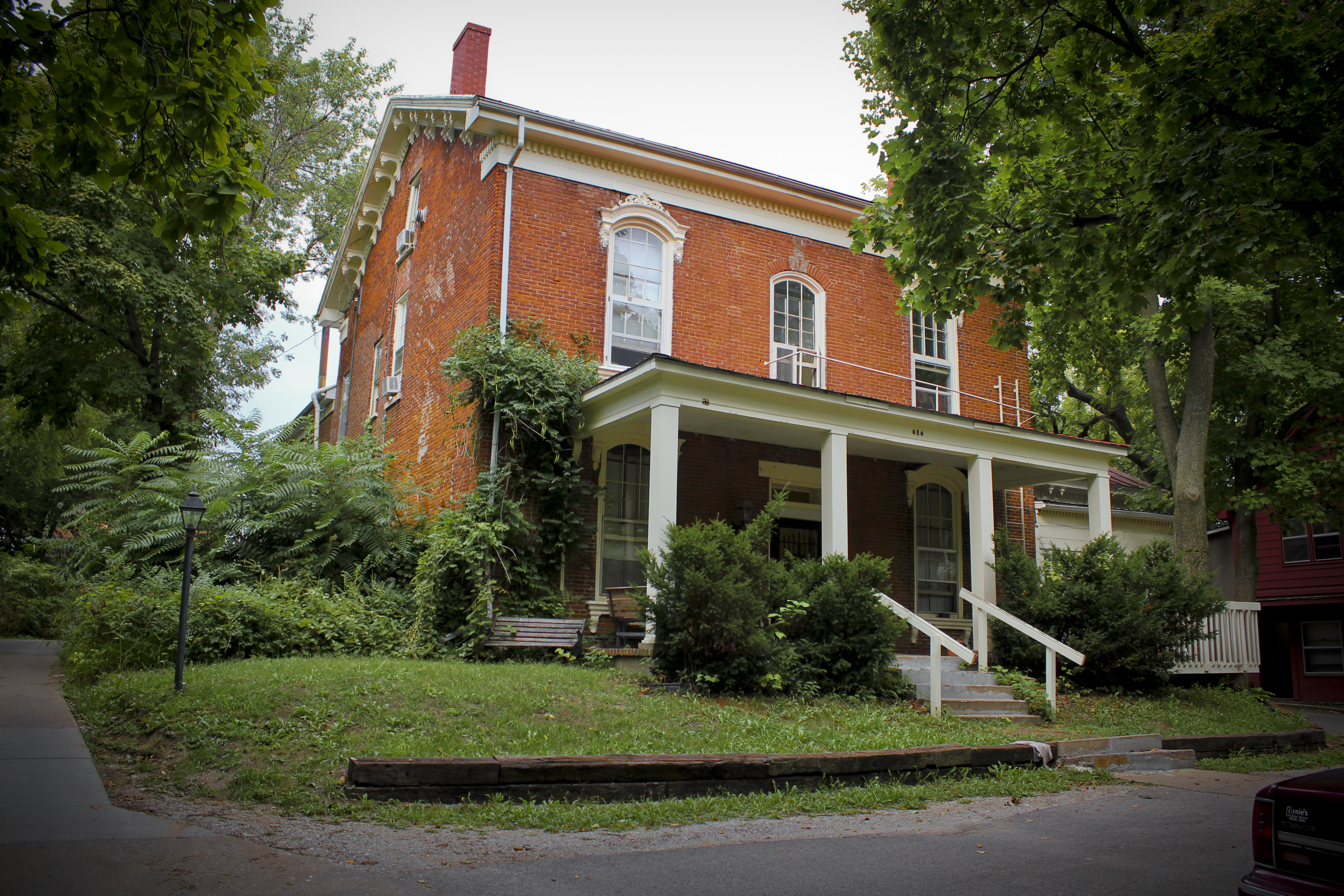

- Location within Iowa Location within the United States
- Location: 414 Brown St., Iowa City, Iowa
- Coordinates: 41°40′14.6″N 91°31′46.2″W
- Area: less than one acre
- Built: c. 1850-1865
- Part of: Brown Street Historic District (ID94001112)
- NRHP reference No.: 79000904
- Added to NRHP: May 31, 1979

The Charles Berryhill House (now part of Black's Gaslight Village) is a historic house located at 414 Brown Street in Iowa City, Iowa.

== Description and history ==
Charles Berryhill was a Pennsylvania native who moved in Iowa City in 1839. Described as a "merchant, farmer, and speculator," he was a charter member of the local Old Settlers' Association. His house was built over a period of about 15 years. The two-story brick main block is the original portion of the house, built in about 1850. It features a bracketed cornice, decorative window hoods, and columned porches. There are various brick and frame additions that were built onto the back of the house in the succeeding years. There is also a small vernacular stone structure behind the house that is reminiscent of similar structures built in Iowa City in the 1840s and the early 1850s.

The house was individually listed on the National Register of Historic Places on May 31, 1979. In 1994, it was included as a contributing property in the Brown Street Historic District.
