= Paul Martyn Lincoln =

American electrical engineer (1870–1944)

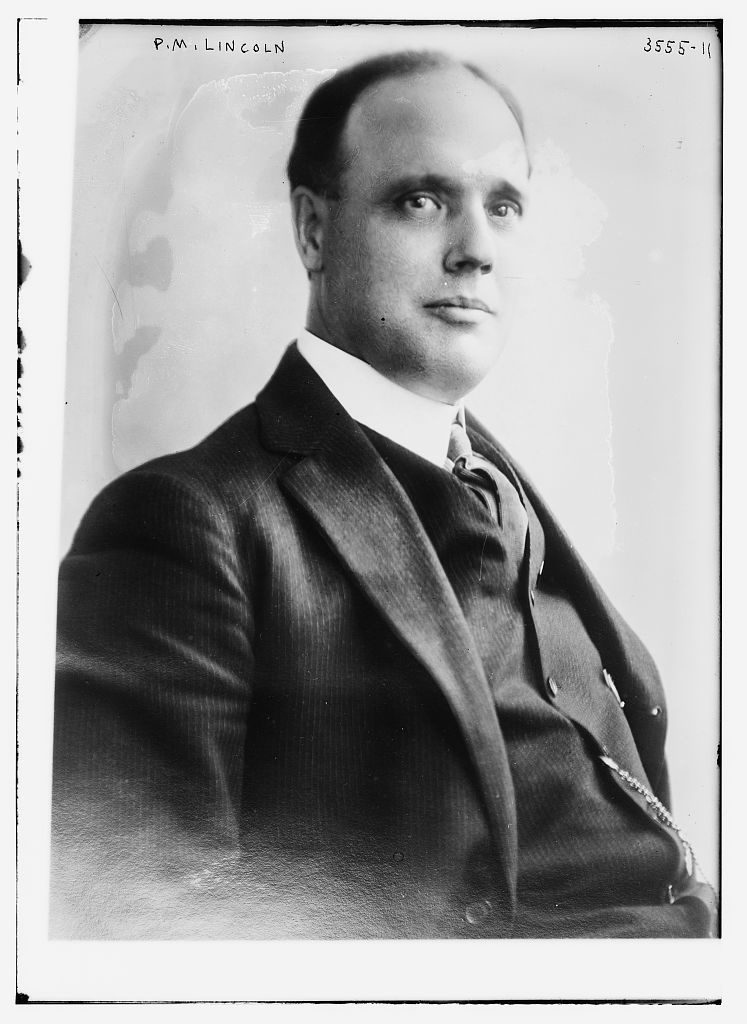
Paul Martyn Lincoln circa 1915

Paul Martyn Lincoln (January 1, 1870 – December 20, 1944) was president of the American Institute of Electrical Engineers from 1914 to 1915. He invented the synchroscope.

== Biography ==
Lincoln was born on January 1, 1870, in Norwood, Michigan. He entered Case Western Reserve University in 1888 but transferred to the Ohio State University before his sophomore year to major in electrical engineering. While a sophomore, he participated in the formation of the first Ohio State football team, and played, at guard, in the first Ohio State game on May 3, 1890. In the fall of that year, Lincoln was elected captain of the team for its first full season.

From 1896 to 1902 he worked at one of the Niagara Falls hydroelectric generating plants as an operating superintendent and later as the resident electrician. He was president of the American Institute of Electrical Engineers from 1914 to 1915.

In 1920, as president of the Ohio State University Alumni Association, he led the alumni fundraising efforts for the building of Ohio Stadium.

He was the director of Department of Electrical Engineering at Cornell University from 1922 to 1938. He died on December 20, 1944.
