= Brown Street Historic District =

Historic district in Iowa, United States

- U.S. National Register of Historic Places
- U.S. Historic district
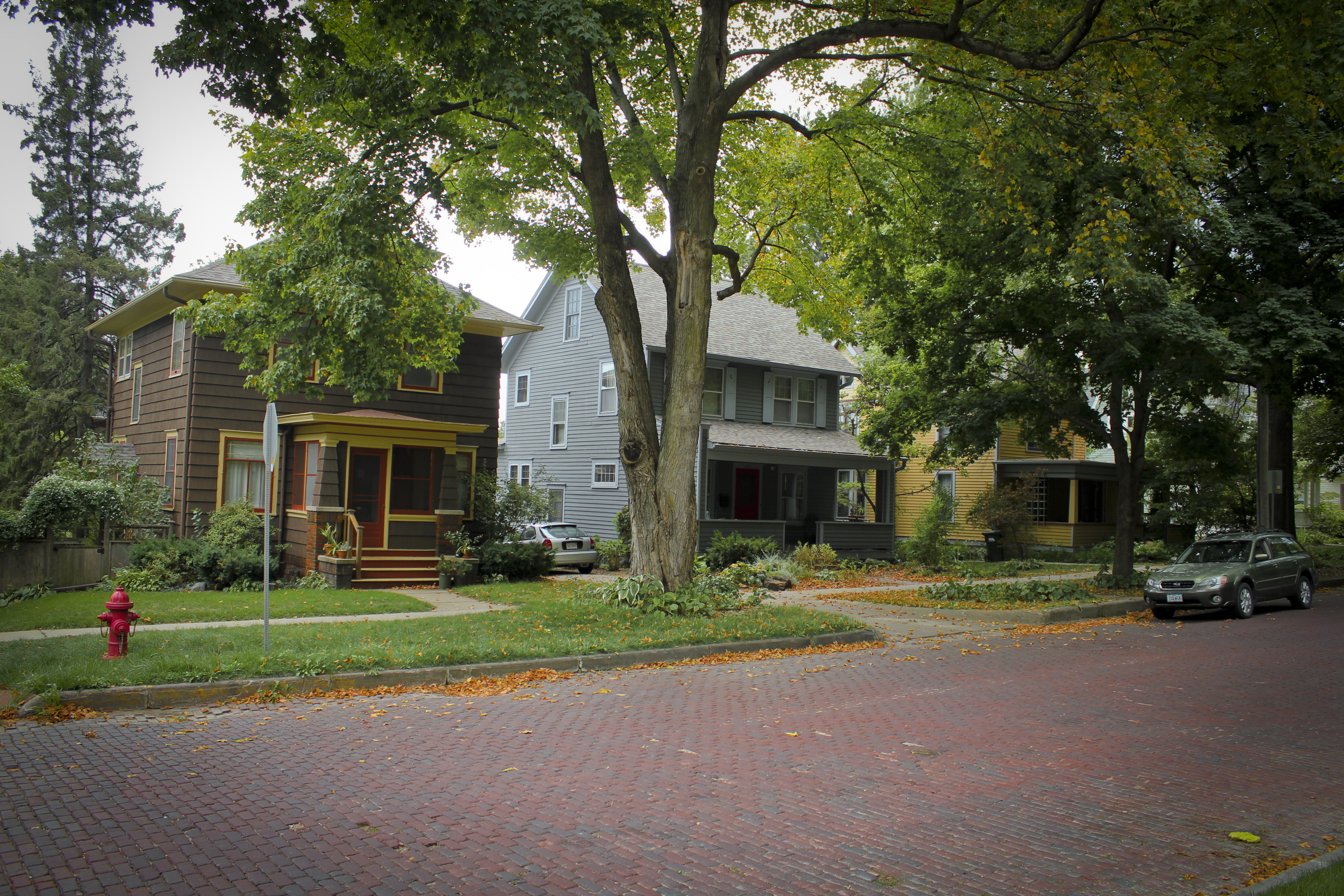

- Location within Iowa Location within the United States
- Location: Roughly Brown St. from west of Linn St. to Governor St., the 500-800 blocks of E. Ronalds St., and adjacent parts of intersecting streets, Iowa City, Iowa
- Coordinates: 41°40′11″N 91°31′43″W
- Area: 15 acres (6.1 ha)
- Architectural style: Queen Anne; Italianate; Greek Revival
- MPS: Iowa City MPS
- NRHP reference No.: 94001112 (original); 04001096 (increase)

Significant dates
- Added to NRHP: September 23, 1994
- Boundary increase: September 29, 2004

The Brown Street Historic District is a nationally recognized historic district located in Iowa City, Iowa, United States.

== History ==
It was listed on the National Register of Historic Places in 1994, and its boundaries were increased in 2004. At the time of the boundary increase it consisted of 246 resources, which included 201 contributing buildings, one contributing structure, and 44 non-contributing buildings.

Brown and East Ronalds Streets are both part of the city's original plat when it was laid out as the capital of the Iowa Territory. They are located on the north edge of the plat. Its significance is derived from the settlement patterns here, the development of a major transportation corridor, the neighborhood's affiliation with the University of Iowa and its growth around the turn of the 20th century, and the architectural styles and forms that are found here from the 1850s to the 1920s.

Many of the city's Bohemian-immigrant population lived here. Businessmen and blue-collar workers lived side by side to each other, as did professors from the University of Iowa. The old Military Road was routed on Brown Street, and after it was paved with bricks in 1907, it became the preferred route for funeral processions to Oakland Cemetery.

Most of the popular architectural styles from late 19th and into the 20th century are found here. The most popular house form is the American Four-Square. Other popular styles include Queen Anne, Italianate, and the Greek Revival. The houses are both one and two stories in height, and wood-frame construction is prominent with rubble stone foundations. Some exteriors are clad in brick. Four houses have been individually listed on the National Register of Historic Places: Charles Berryhill House (c. 1850–1865), Vogt House (1890), Bohumil Shimek House (c. 1890), and the Arthur Hillyer Ford House (1909).

Brown Street Historic District is also home to Happy Hollow park, a 3.3-acre park that was acquired by the city in 1945. The hollow is the result of inhabitants removing clay from the area to make bricks that were used in nearby homes. In 2018, the park received a new park shelter and restroom, with an estimated cost of $182,250. Happy Hollow Park has been the subject of ongoing coverage over the decision to replace the baseball infield with turf and reclassifying the park.

Beginning in 2022, the Brown Street Historic District was the site of a project to increase affordable housing in Iowa City. The city sold a vacant lot at 724 Ronalds Street to a nonprofit that has worked with the Iowa City Community School District to build affordable rental housing and provide students with on-the-job vocational training.
