= Cambridge Regional College =

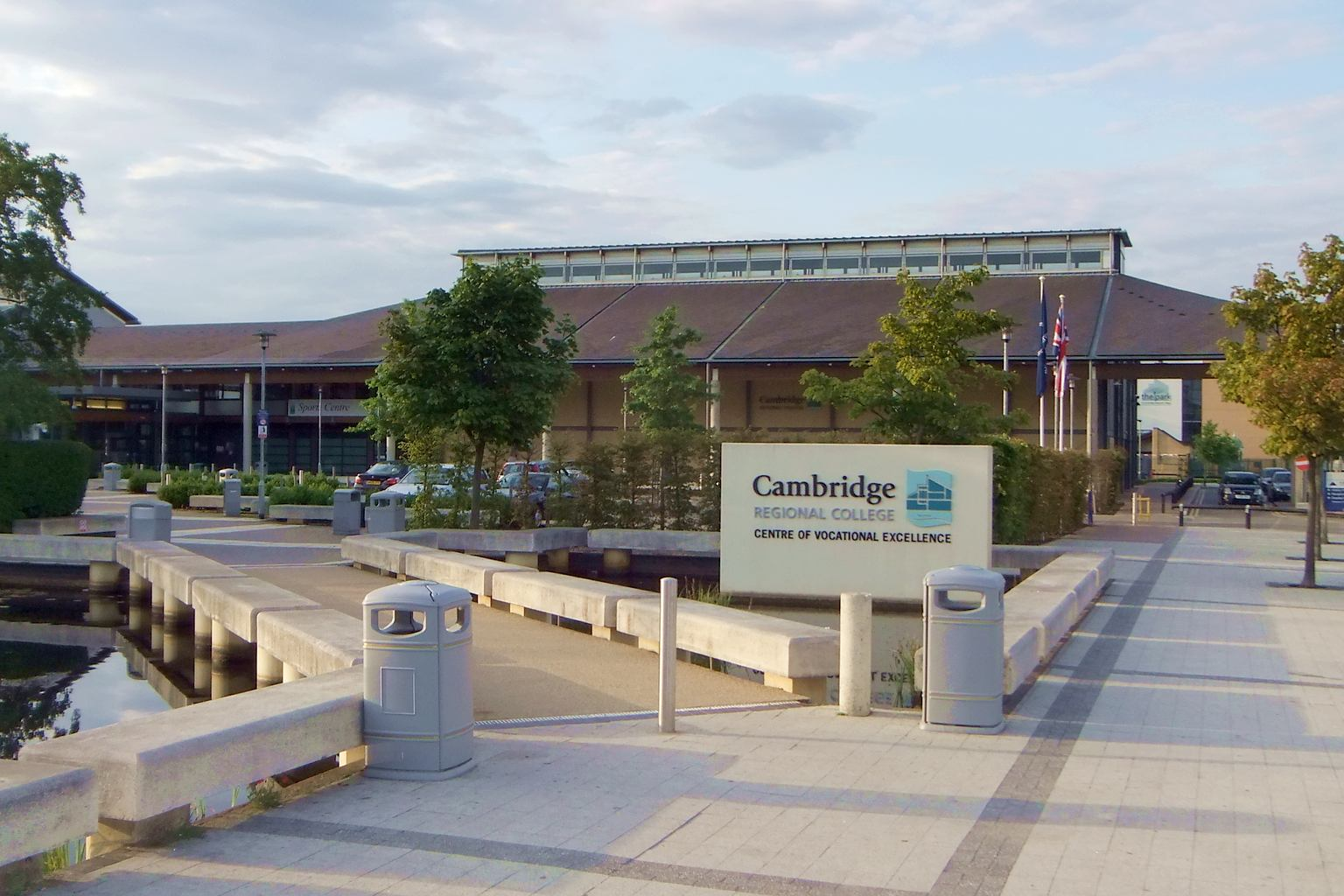
- Main entrance.

Location
- Kings Hedges Road; Cambridge, Cambridgeshire, CB4 2QT; England; 52°14′09″N 00°08′02″E

Information
- Type: Further education
- Motto: First for training and skills
- Local authority: Cambridgeshire County Council
- Department for Education URN: 130610 Tables
- Ofsted: Reports
- Principal and Chief Executive: Mark Robertson
- Gender: Mixed
- Age range: 16+
- Colour: Blue
- Website: www.camre.ac.uk
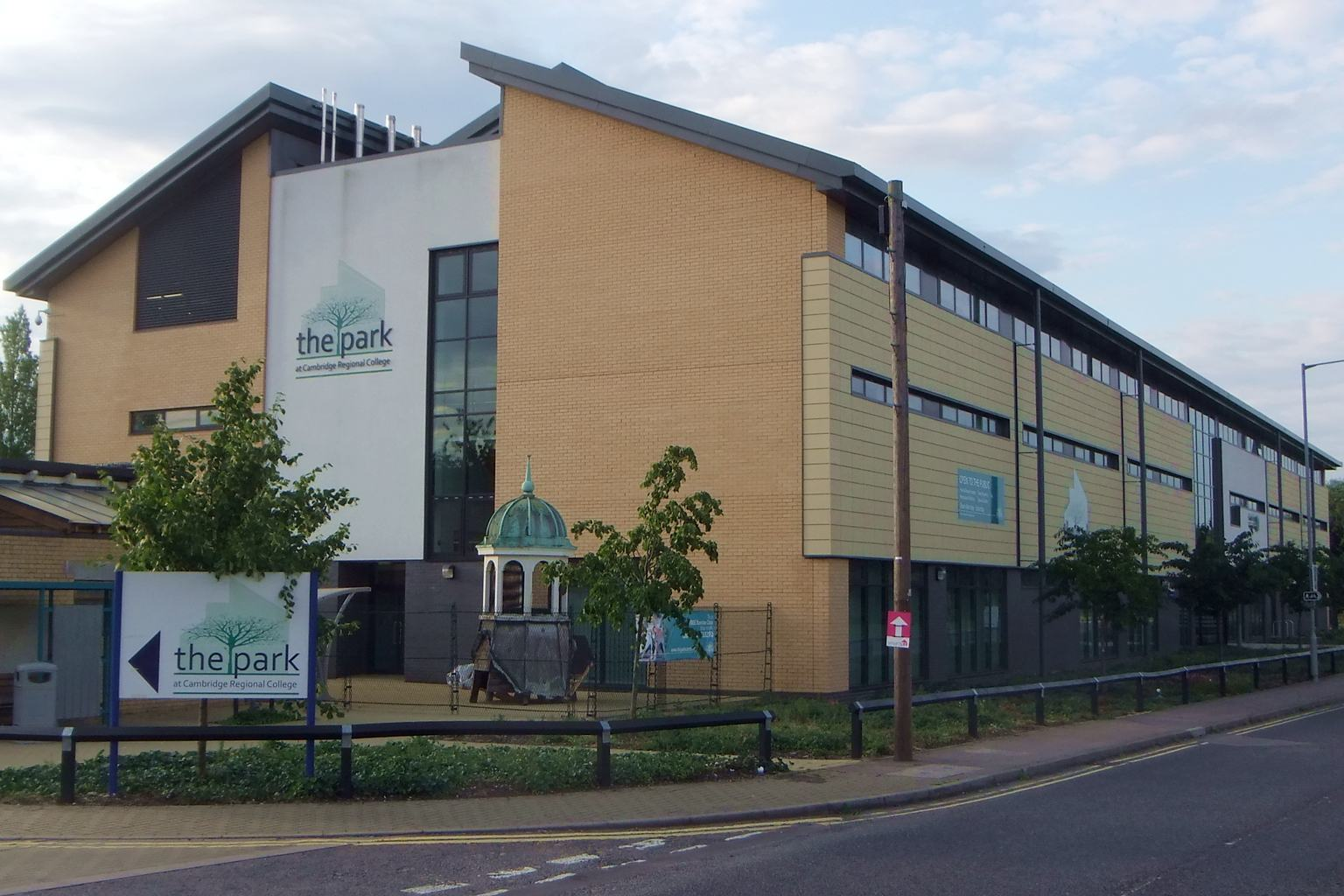
- The park building.

Cambridge Regional College is a mixed further education college in Cambridge, Cambridgeshire, England.

== College profile ==
The college offers courses in a wide range of subjects from hair and beauty and mechanics to media studies and science, as well as apprenticeship programmes. It attracts British students from a 50-mile radius across the eastern region, and is also popular with overseas students studying English, often alongside other subjects.

In 2017, Cambridge Regional College (CRC) merged with what was formerly Huntingdon Regional College, to create one college with two campus sites.

It is one of the largest providers of full-time further education for 16- to 19-year-olds in the region, with more than 4,000 full-time and 6,000 part-time students. Over 80 per cent of full-time students are aged 16 to 18 years old and come to the College after secondary school; the rest are mature students, studying on a range of Access to Higher Education and vocational programmes.

More than 96% of students go on to find work or continue their studies into Higher Education.

Facilities include purpose-built art and design studios, a £9 million motor vehicle workshop, hair and beauty salons, catering kitchens and a sports centre. Commercial hair and beauty salons, a spa, a fine dining restaurant and a bistro, all based at The Park at CRC, provide students with work experience.

The SmartLIFE Centre is where modern methods of construction (MMC) and sustainability courses are taught. A new £2.5million SmartLIFE Low Carbon Centre, part of The Hive Education and Enterprise Park, opened in September 2011 to further develop the college’s range of ‘green’ construction, energy and sustainable courses.

The college celebrates a number of religious festivals and international events throughout the year, as well as supporting initiatives such as Anti-Bullying Week. It also has strong links with local employers, providing work-based learning and professional qualification programmes for their staff.

The college formerly had two campuses, one in the city centre of Cambridge and the other in King's Hedges next to Cambridge Science Park. The city centre site was sold for residential development to help fund the development of the main campus in King’s Hedges Road.

== Notable alumni ==
- Andy Holden, artist
- Russ McPherson, mayor of Cabridge (2020-2022)
