= Norwood Township, Michigan =

- Civil township
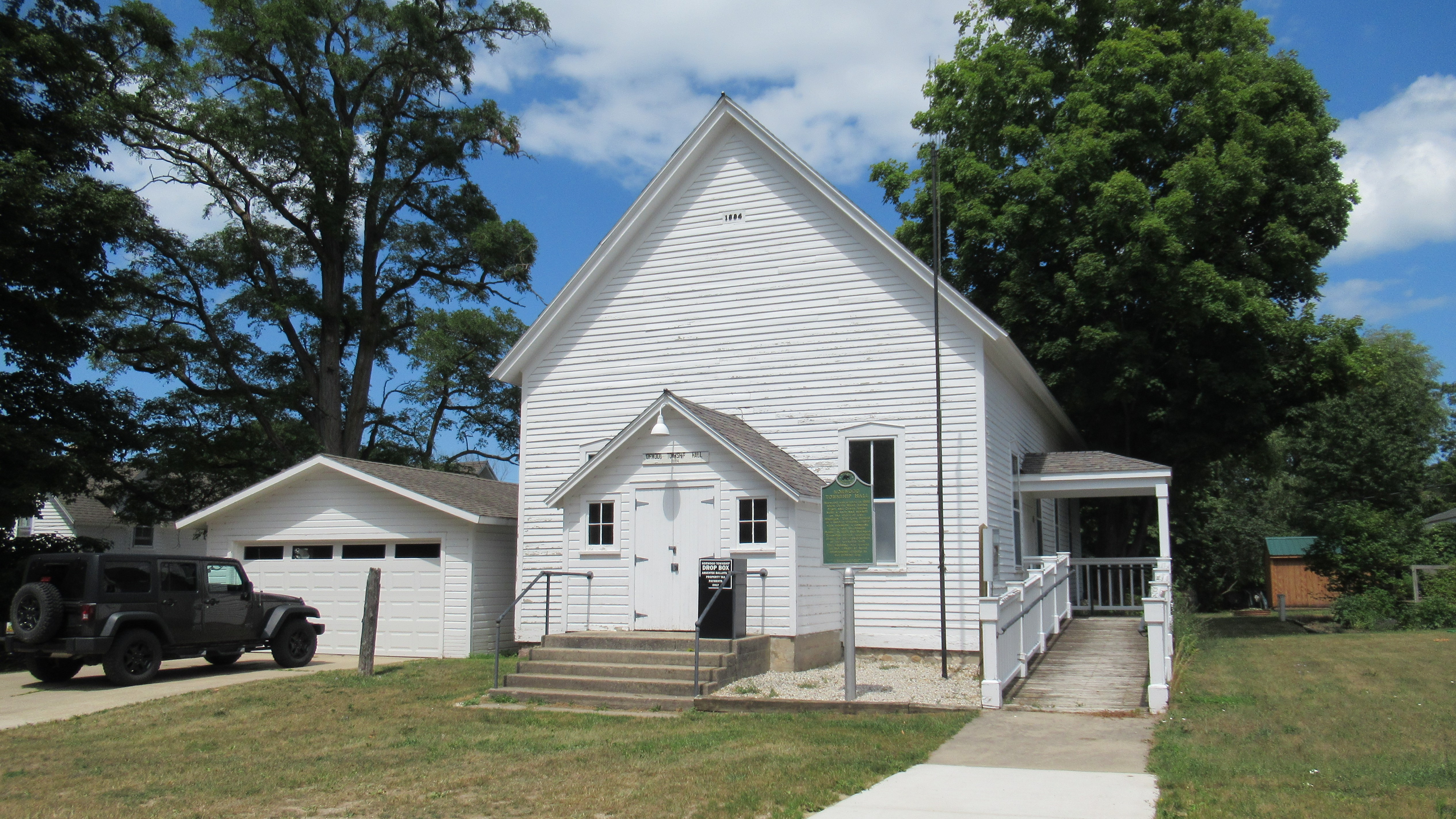
- Norwood Township Hall in Norwood

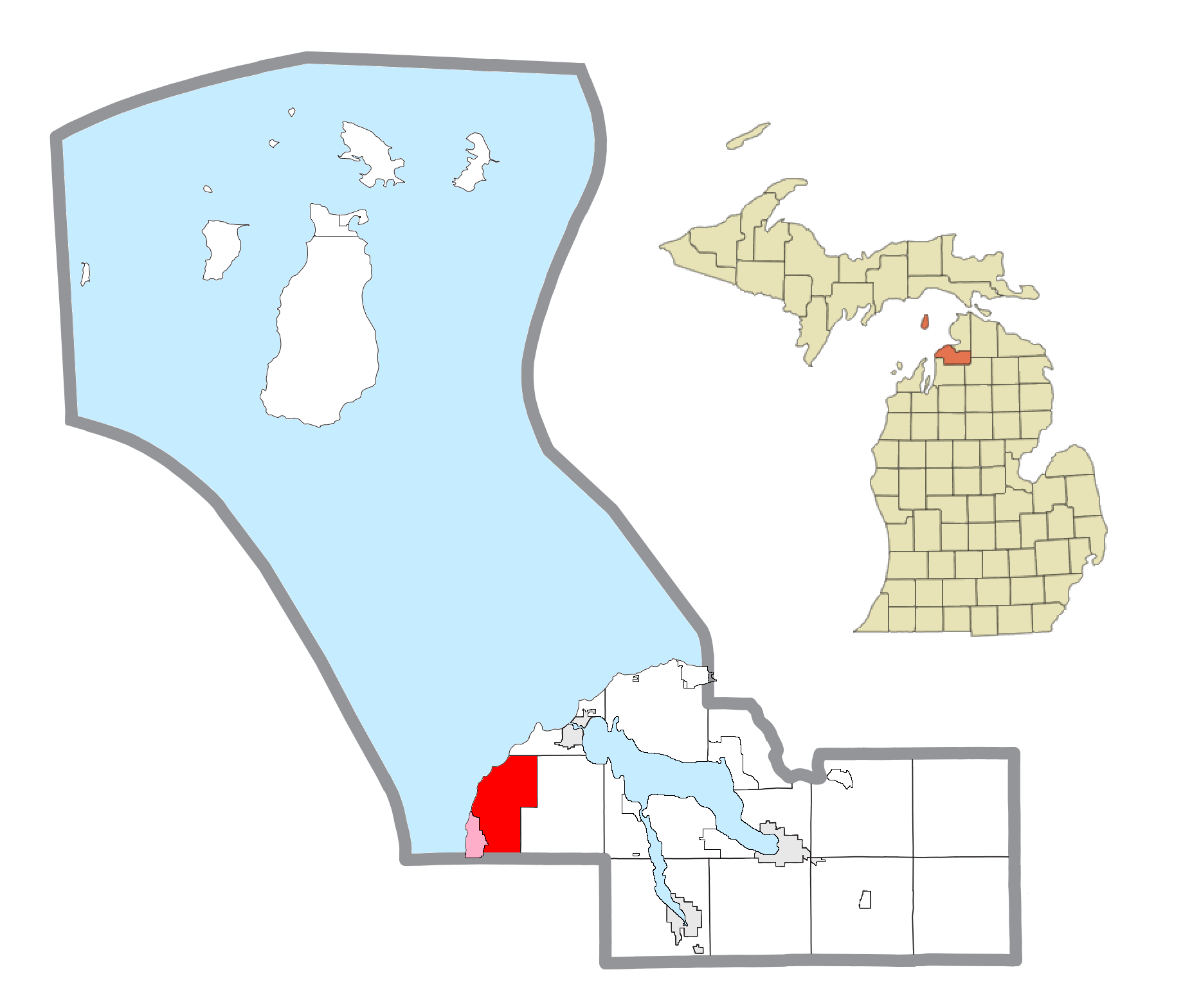
- Location within Charlevoix County (red) and the administered CDP of Norwood (pink)

- Location within the state of Michigan Location within the United States
- Coordinates: 45°14′37″N 85°20′41″W
- Country: United States
- State: Michigan
- County: Charlevoix

Government
  - Supervisor: Benjamin Freds
  - Clerk: Brenda Freds

Area
  - Total: 24.40 sq mi (63.20 km^{2})
  - Land: 18.16 sq mi (47.03 km^{2})
  - Water: 6.24 sq mi (16.16 km^{2})
- Elevation: 702 ft (214 m)

Population (2020)
  - Total: 700
  - Density: 39/sq mi (15/km^{2})
- Time zone: UTC-5 (Eastern (EST))
  - Summer (DST): UTC-4 (EDT)
- ZIP code(s): 49720 (Charlevoix)
- Area code: 231
- FIPS code: 26-59340
- GNIS feature ID: 1626825
- Website: Official website

Norwood Township is a civil township of Charlevoix County in the U.S. state of Michigan. The population was 700 at the 2020 census.

== Communities ==
- Inwood is a former settlement located within the township. A post office operated here from September 11, 1879 until June 30, 1904. Inwood appears within the township on a 1911 map of Charlevoix County.
- Norwood is an unincorporated community and census-designated place located in the southwest portion of the township at 45°13′00″N 85°22′53″W.

== Geography ==
According to the U.S. Census Bureau, the township has a total area of 24.40 square miles (63.20 km^{2}), of which 18.16 square miles (47.03 km^{2}) is land and 6.24 square miles (16.16 km^{2}) (25.57%) is water.

Norwood Township is located along the shores of Lake Michigan and contains the southern portion of Fisherman's Island State Park.

=== Major highways ===
- US 31 runs south–north through the center of the township.

== Demographics ==
As of the census of 2000, there were 714 people, 283 households, and 213 families residing in the township. The population density was 39.3 inhabitants per square mile (15.2/km^{2}). There were 385 housing units at an average density of 21.2 per square mile (8.2/km^{2}). The racial makeup of the township was 97.76% White, 1.12% Native American, 0.14% Asian, 0.42% from other races, and 0.56% from two or more races. Hispanic or Latino of any race were 0.70% of the population.

There were 283 households, out of which 29.7% had children under the age of 18 living with them, 67.8% were married couples living together, 3.5% had a female householder with no husband present, and 24.4% were non-families. 21.6% of all households were made up of individuals, and 10.6% had someone living alone who was 65 years of age or older. The average household size was 2.49 and the average family size was 2.85.

In the township the population was spread out, with 24.5% under the age of 18, 4.6% from 18 to 24, 26.8% from 25 to 44, 28.9% from 45 to 64, and 15.3% who were 65 years of age or older. The median age was 42 years. For every 100 females, there were 108.8 males. For every 100 females age 18 and over, there were 103.4 males.

The median income for a household in the township was $50,500, and the median income for a family was $56,154. Males had a median income of $36,635 versus $23,889 for females. The per capita income for the township was $23,802. About 1.0% of families and 3.8% of the population were below the poverty line, including 2.6% of those under age 18 and 1.6% of those age 65 or over.

== Education ==
Norwood Township is served entirely by Charlevoix Public Schools to the north in the city of Charlevoix.
