= Jenny Bailey =

British Liberal Democrat politician

Her Worship Jenny Bailey
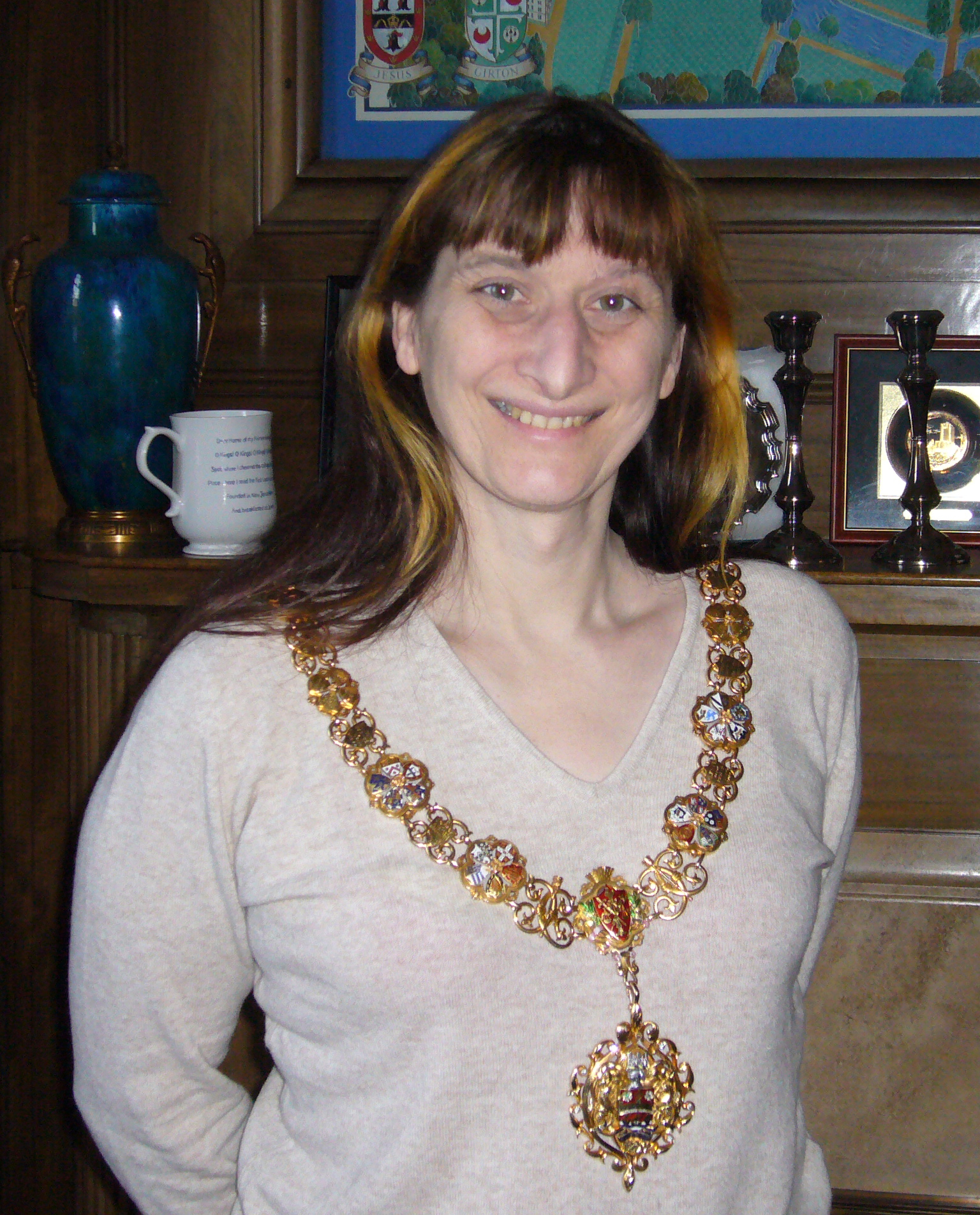

801st Mayor of Cambridge
- In office 2007–2008
- Preceded by: Robert Dryden
- Succeeded by: Mike Dixon

Cambridge City Councillor, East Chesterton Ward
- In office May 2002 – May 2008

Personal details
- Born: Doncaster Prison
- Party: Liberal Democrats
- Spouse: Jennifer Liddle
- Children: 2

Jenny Bailey is a British Liberal Democrat politician who was the civic leader of Cambridge City Council in Cambridge, England. Bailey served her mayoral term from 2007 to 2008. Bailey became a member of the city council in 2002, when she was elected to represent the suburb of East Chesterton within Cambridge. She served the council continuously from 2002 to 2007, rising the ranks until she was chosen to become mayor in 2007. Prior to her appointment as full mayor, she acted as a deputy in 2006.

She was the first transgender mayor in the United Kingdom, and the second globally after Georgina Beyer, Mayor of Carterton, New Zealand. Bailey herself was keen to play down the significance of her appointment, saying, "I don't want to let it define me." Bailey had undergone gender transitioning 11 years prior to assuming office in the council.

Bailey was married before her transition, and became a parent to two sons. Bailey and her longtime companion Jennifer Liddle entered into a civil partnership on 22 September 2011. Liddle, a former councillor, is also a trans woman.

== Personal life ==
Bailey was born in Doncaster Prison, where her father worked as a prison officer. She was brought up at Doncaster prison camp, and has said that her own confusion about her gender arose as early as aged 6 or 7. In school, Bailey joined the radio club led by her physics teacher and decided to follow this interest in her professional working life. Aged 20, she received a sponsorship from local company Pye Telecom to take part in a three-year training course. This involved placements at Lanchester Polytechnic, colleges in Coventry and industrial training in Cambridge. Bailey worked in several jobs as a telecommunications engineer before becoming involved in politics.

In her 20s, she had to further suppress her confusion over her gender as she married a cisgender woman and became a parent to two sons. However, the marriage met with an amicable demise soon after; Bailey maintained a relationship with her former wife and upon hearing that Bailey was to be sworn in as mayor, her former wife said that she was "incredibly proud". She began hormone replacement therapy in 1990, aged 29. There she met her current partner, Jennifer Liddle, who also worked as a software engineer and was also undergoing gender transitioning. Bailey had sex reassignment surgery in 1993.

Bailey follows the Buddhist religion and is a vegetarian in accordance with these beliefs. On 22 September 2011 Bailey and Liddle entered into a civil partnership at Cambridge's Shire Hall.

== Political activity ==
Bailey made the decision to enter politics in the early 2000s, and she later said that her ambition to make a contribution to local life was the biggest incentive behind this career choice. She became a councillor for the Liberal Democrats in 2002 after being elected to represent East Chesterton. Bailey had long taken an interest in environmental issues, and she made them a feature of her tenure in office; promoting cycling, waste management, recycling, and advocating the use of public transport; as well as implementing several schemes to aid local residents in these activities. She served as a school governor for Chesterton Community College for a short period.

In 2004, she was appointed as Executive Councillor for Planning and Transportation, and in this role successfully led the Council's new parking enforcement role. She was also re-elected as councillor for East Chesterton, winning 40.7% of the vote; a margin of 2.4% over her partner, Liddle. She was promoted to deputy mayor in 2006, acting as Ceremonial Bailiff to the mayor at select civic ceremonial events.

At Cambridge City Council's annual meeting on 24 May 2007, Bailey was appointed mayor for the municipal year of 2007–2008, thus becoming the 801st first citizen of Cambridge. Her job as mayor entailed attending approximately 500 social engagements. Bailey chose two charities, Press Relief and the Cambridge Museum of Technology, to be the primary benefactors of the fundraising done throughout her tenure. Bailey also vowed to give recognition to the unsung heroes of the city.

She was succeeded by her deputy mayor, Mike Dixon, in 2008.

Despite it being well known among councillors for several years, Bailey's appointment garnered significant media coverage, with Fox News reporting the story in the USA. Bailey, however, said that she did not want the issue to eclipse being mayor.
