= Cambridge Community Kitchen =

Volunteer-run free food service in Cambridge, UK

- Cambridge Community Kitchen
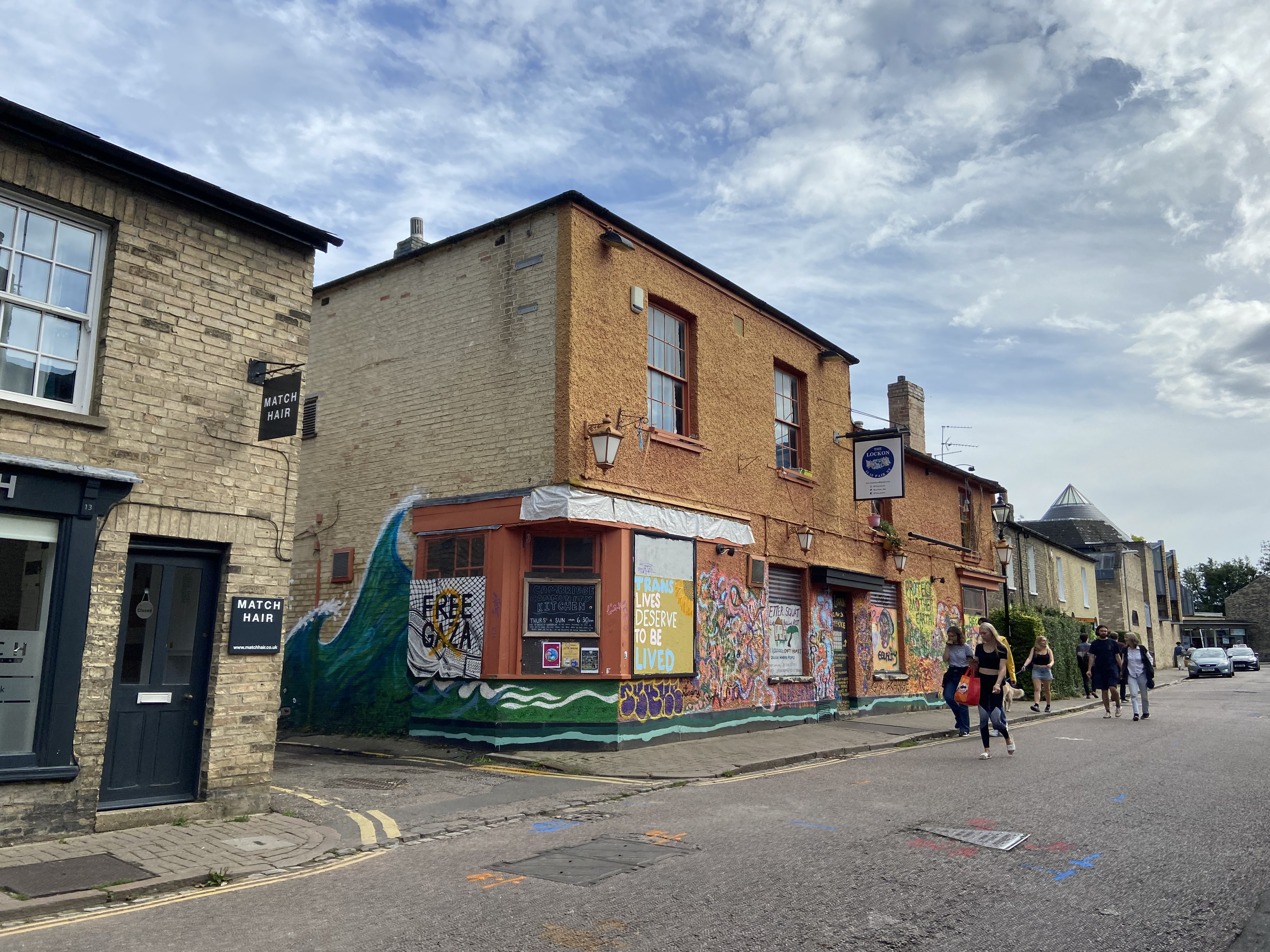
- Abbreviation: CCK
- Formation: November 13, 2020; 5 years ago
- Headquarters: The Lockon, 11-12 Fair Street, Cambridge, CB1 1HA
- Coordinates: 52.207362°N 0.129446°E
- Website: https://cckitchen.uk/

Cambridge Community Kitchen (CCK) is a volunteer-run collective that provides free vegan meals several times a week in Cambridge, England.

The group is not a charity, wishing to avoid the Lobbying Act that restricts party-political statements from charities in election seasons and the paperwork required to gain the legal status. Instead, the non-hierarchical organisation views its work as mutual aid. Many, though not all, volunteers view themselves as anarchists and many are activists, including one of the original squatters who had previously been involved with Extinction Rebellion. Another of the founding squatters had previously volunteered at the Calais Refugee Community Kitchen.

== History ==
The kitchen is based in an old pub, The Hopbine, which closed on Wednesday 20 February 2019. Six months after the pub closing, in July 2020, and with the ongoing COVID pandemic, the site was squatted by a group of 10 to form "The Lockon". Four months after being squatted, on Sunday 15 November 2020, Cambridge Community Kitchen started distributing food to locals. Meals continued to be served, including on Christmas Eve and Boxing Day.

In February 2021, Cambridge City Mayor, Cllr Russ McPherson, awarded the organisation with a "Volunteer of Cambridge" certificate, intending to highlight people who supported the city throughout the pandemic. One member said "We're like, 'Thanks for your printed out certificate. We're literally doing your job for you.' [Laughs.] Maybe you could, I don't know, give us some money, at least do the thing of feeding people?". During this period over 100 volunteers worked in "bubbled" teams and altered the service to be "contact free".

In August 2022 CCK delivered around 270 meals across the city, two times a week. In 2024 the collective expanded their offer, going from only serving meals on Thursdays and Sundays, to offering eat-in meals on Tuesdays without the option to have food delivered.

In 2025 Cambridge Green Party wrote in support of the project after Paul Bristow, Mayor of Cambridgeshire and Peterborough, wrote to Cambridge City Council with the hopes of evicting CCK from The Lockon. Cambridge Council responded saying that they have taken all actions possible and "had been informed that the owner/landlord had taken legal advice in order to initiate proceedings to take back possession of the property".
