= Ding Darling =

American cartoonist

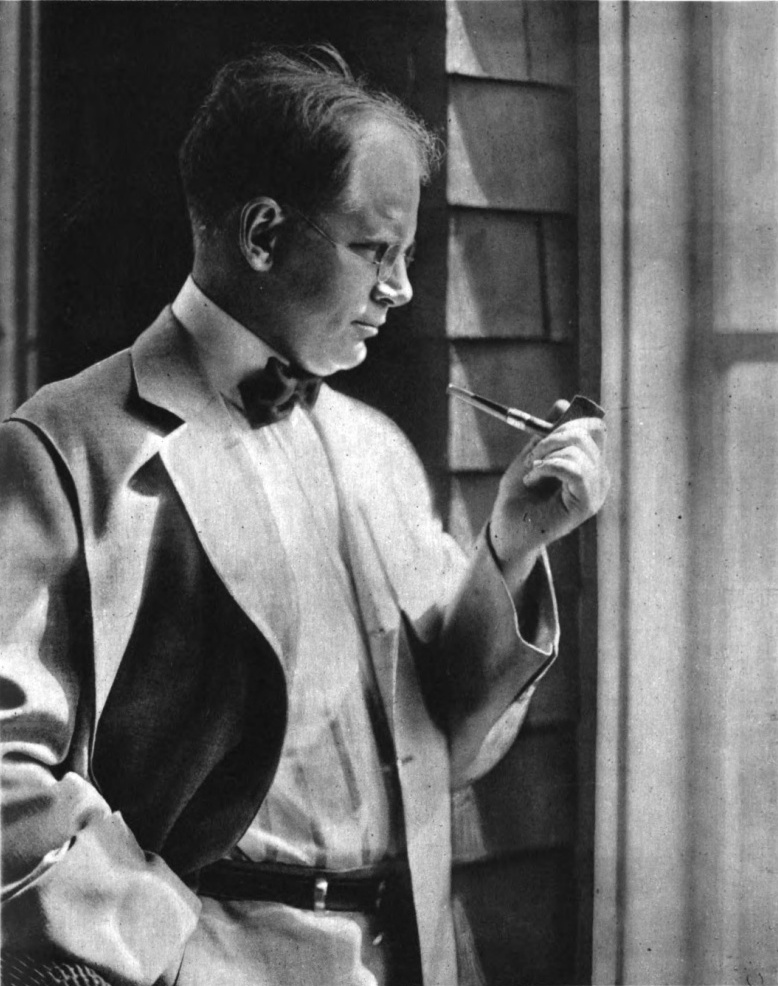
- Darling, c. 1918
- Born: Jay Norwood Darling; October 21, 1876; Norwood, Michigan, U.S.
- Died: February 12, 1962 (aged 85); Des Moines, Iowa, U.S.
- Occupation: Editorial cartoonist (1906 – 1949)
- Known for: Founder of National Wildlife Federation
- Spouse: Genevieve Pendleton (m. 1906)
- Children: 2
- Awards: Pulitzer Prize (1924, 1943)

Jay Norwood Darling (October 21, 1876 – February 12, 1962), better known as Ding Darling, was an American cartoonist who won two Pulitzer Prizes. He was an important figure in the 20th century conservation movement and founded the National Wildlife Federation. In addition, he was known to be close friends with Walt Disney.

== Early life ==
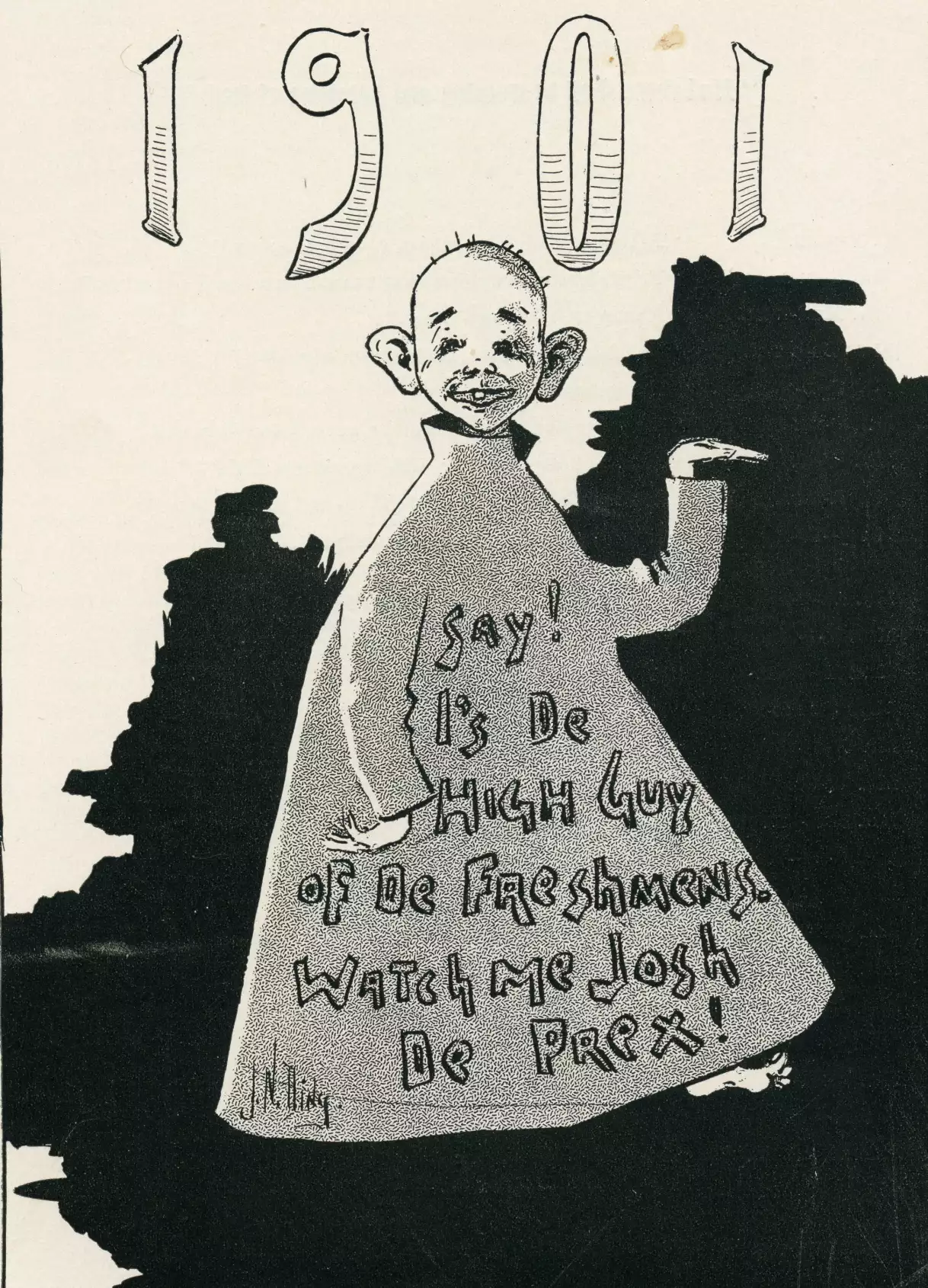
Jay N. "Ding" Darling's parody of Richard F. Outcault's popular cartoon character the "Yellow Kid", published in the 1899 Codex yearbook of Beloit College

Darling was born in Norwood, Michigan, where his parents, Clara R. (Woolson) and Marcellus Warner Darling, had recently moved so that Marcellus could begin work as a minister. In 1886, the family moved to Sioux City, Iowa, where Darling developed an early appreciation for nature and wildlife during days spent wandering the prairie. He began to learn the importance of conservation as a youth after an uncle admonished him for shooting a wood duck during nesting season.

Darling began college in 1894 at Yankton College in South Dakota and moved to Beloit College in Wisconsin the following year, where he began his studies in pre-medicine and became a member of Beta Theta Pi. While at Beloit he became art editor of the yearbook and began signing his work with a contraction of his last name, D'ing, a nickname that stuck.

== Editorial cartoons ==
In 1900, Ding became a reporter for the Sioux City Journal. Following his marriage to Genevieve Pendleton in 1906, he began work with the Des Moines Register and Leader. In 1911, he moved to New York and worked with the New York Globe but went back to Des Moines in 1913. Three years later, in 1916, he returned to New York and accepted a position with the New York Herald Tribune.

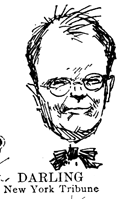
Self-portrait, 1919

By 1919, Darling returned a final time to Des Moines where he continued his career as a cartoonist, winning the Pulitzer Prize for Editorial Cartooning in 1924 and again in 1943. His cartoons were published from 1917 to 1949 in the New York Herald Tribune.

== Wildlife conservation ==
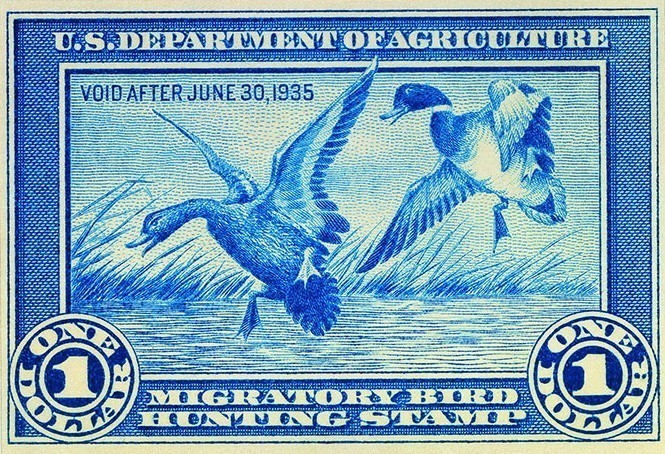
First duck stamp, designed by Darling

Darling penned some conservation cartoons, and he was an important figure in the conservation movement. President Franklin Roosevelt appointed him to a blue-ribbon Committee on Wildlife Restoration in 1934. FDR sought political balance by putting the Hoover Republican on the committee, knowing he was an articulate advocate for wildlife management.

Following the passage of the Migratory Bird Hunting Stamp Act in 1934, which required waterfowl hunters to purchase a Federal Duck Stamp before hunting, Darling designed the first Federal Duck Stamp that year and was appointed Director of the Bureau of Biological Survey, a forerunner of the United States Fish and Wildlife Service.

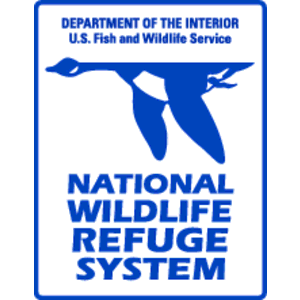
The National Wildlife Refuge System logo, also designed by Darling

The J. N. "Ding" Darling National Wildlife Refuge on Sanibel Island in southwest Florida is named after him, as is the Lake Darling State Park in Iowa that was dedicated on September 17, 1950. Lake Darling, a 9,600-acre lake at the Upper Souris National Wildlife Refuge is also named in his honor. More recently a lodge at the National Conservation Training Center near Shepherdstown, West Virginia was named in his honor.

Darling was elected as a member of the Boone and Crockett Club, a wildlife conservation organization, on December 13, 1934.

He was instrumental in founding the National Wildlife Federation in 1936, when President Franklin Roosevelt convened the first North American Wildlife Conference (now the North American Wildlife and Natural Resources Conference), administered by the American Wildlife Institute (now Wildlife Management Institute).

== Awards ==
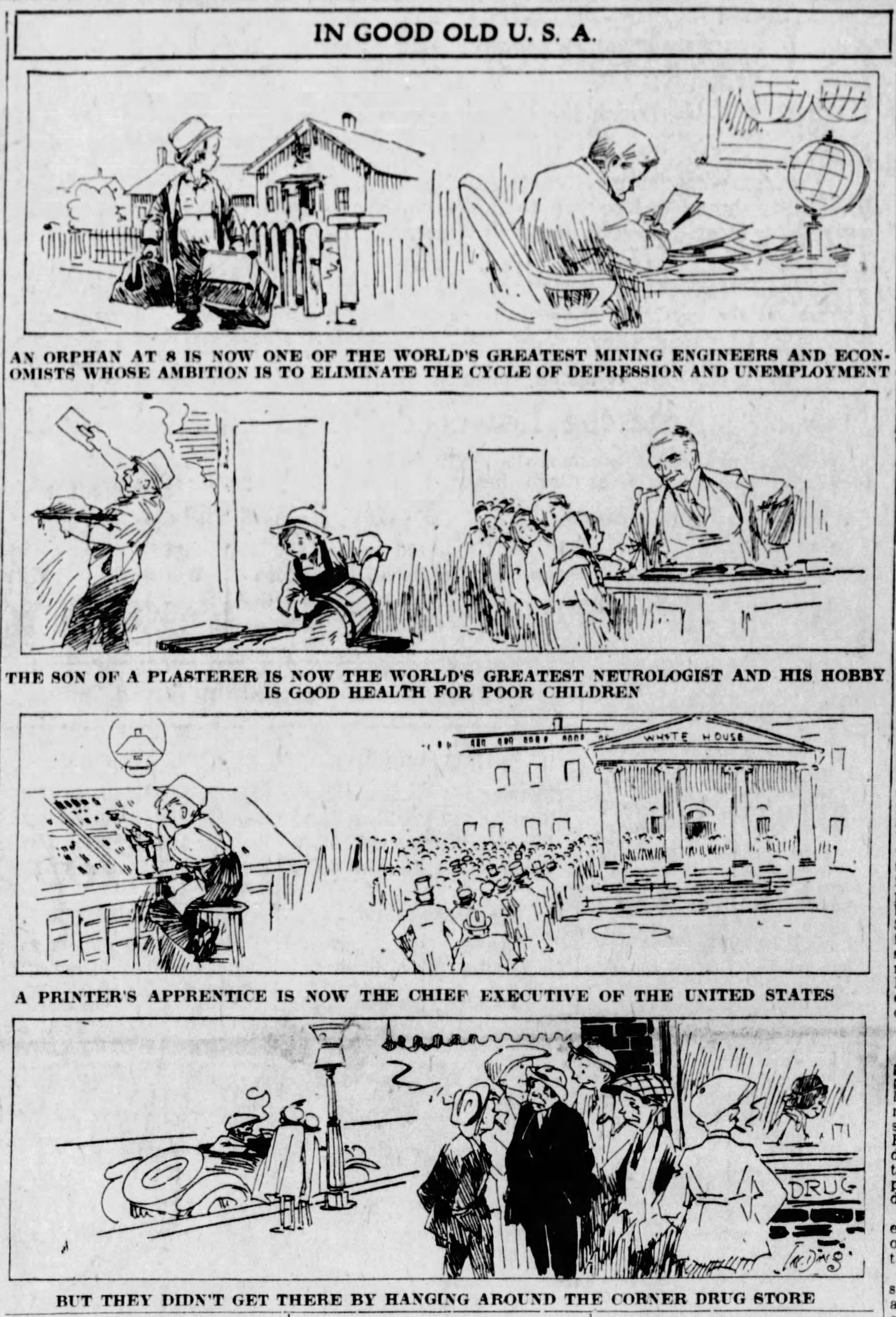
"In Good Old U.S.A.", for which Darling received the 1924 Pulitzer Prize for Editorial Cartooning

Darling twice received the Pulitzer Prize for Editorial Cartooning for his work with the Register & Tribune. Darling was first awarded the prize in 1924 for his work "In the Good Old USA" and again in 1943 for "What a Place For a Waste Paper Salvage Campaign".

He was awarded the Audubon Medal in 1960 by National Audubon Society for "outstanding achievement in the field of conservation and environmental protection".

== See also ==
- Jay Norwood and Genevieve Pendleton Darling House
