= Frederic Lincoln =

Frederic, Frederick or Fred Lincoln may refer to:

- Frederic W. Lincoln Jr. (1817–1898), American politician, mayor of Boston in the 1850s and 1860s
- Frederick Charles Lincoln (1892–1960), American ornithologist
- Frederic W. Lincoln IV (1898–1968), American member of Rockefeller family
- Fred Lincoln (umpire) (1878–1940), baseball umpire
- Fred J. Lincoln (1936–2013), American film director, producer, screenwriter, actor, editor and cinematographer of pornographic films
