= Robert Brigham (fl. 1377–1402) =

Member of the Parliament of England

Robert Brigham (fl. 1377–1402) was an English Member of Parliament.

He was a Member (MP) of the Parliament of England for Cambridge in October 1377, 1386, 1394, 1395 and 1402. He was the son of Cambridge MP, Robert Brigham and his wife, Maud. Brigham married Isabel and they had one recorded child, the MP also named Robert Brigham.

Brigham was Mayor of Cambridge in September 1378–9, 1386–8, 1393–4, 1396-9 and 1405–6. He died at some point before 1411–12.
