= American School of Wild Life Protection Historic District =

Historic district in Iowa, United States

- U.S. National Register of Historic Places
- U.S. Historic district
- Location within Iowa Location within the United States
- Location: McGregor Heights Rd., north of McGregor
- Coordinates: 43°01′43″N 91°10′33″W
- Area: 17 acres (6.9 ha)
- MPS: Conservation Movement in Iowa MPS
- NRHP reference No.: 91001840
- Added to NRHP: December 23, 1991

The American School of Wild Life Protection Historic District is a nationally recognized historic district located on the north side of McGregor, Iowa, United States. It was listed on the National Register of Historic Places in 1991. At the time of its nomination the district consisted of 30 resources, including 17 contributing buildings, one contributing site, one contributing structure, nine noncontributing buildings, two noncontributing sites. The American School of Wild Life Protection was established in 1919 in a resort area known as McGregor Heights. The purpose of the school was to promote resource conservation values among the public. It grew out legislation in 1918 that established state parks in Iowa. The school also promoted the idea of establishing a national park in the Upper Mississippi River Valley, and after that did not come about, the Upper Mississippi River National Wildlife and Fish Refuge. The school continued in existence until 1941.

The site for the school, McGregor Heights, had been established as a Chautauqua site by the McGregor Improvement Company in 1898. The district is made up of 20 cabins that were mostly built between 1898 and the early 1920s. Because they were built at different times they encompass a variety of styles. Those who attended the school stayed in the cabins. The irregular McGregor Heights Road that the cabins are located along is the contributing structure. It was built by the City of McGregor in 1899. That same year the city provided water and electric service to the area. Fourteen concrete piers on which a pavilion was built c. 1926 are also in the district. It was the only permanent structure built for the school. Prior to its construction sessions and meals were held in tents. The pavilion was taken down in 1958 after sitting unused for several years.
