= Norwood, Michigan =

- Census-designated place (CDP) & unincorporated community
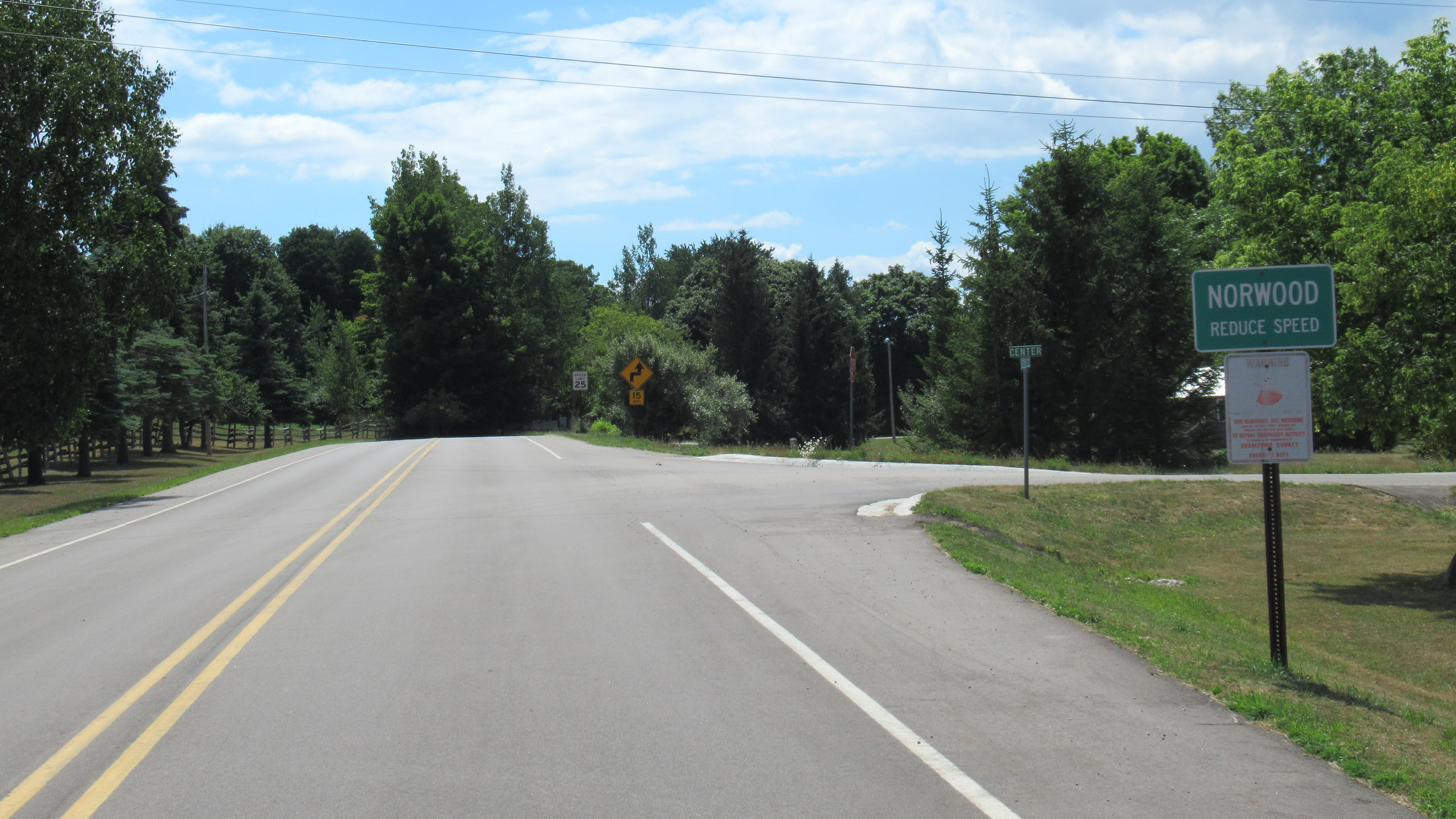
- Road signage along Norwood Road

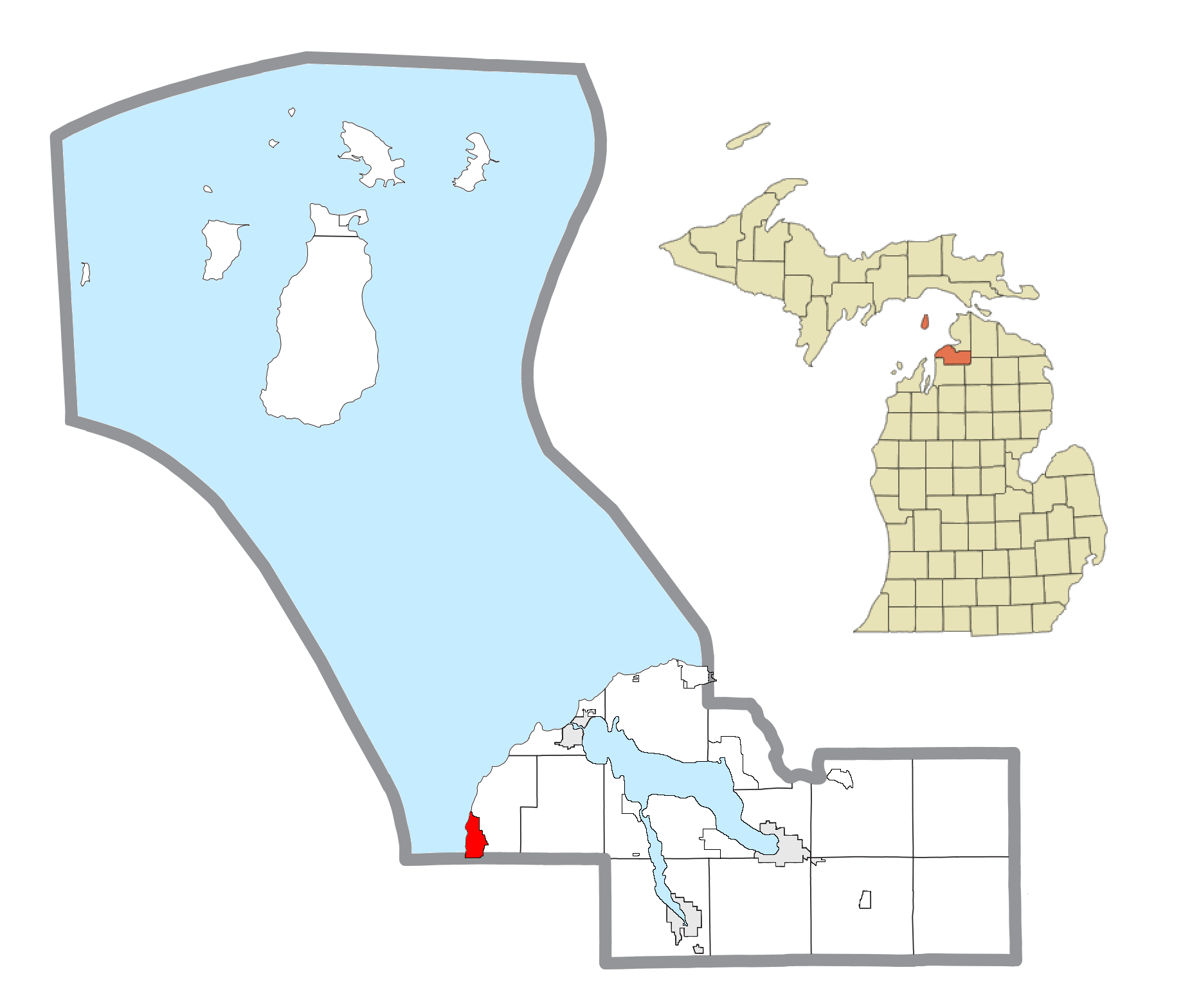
- Location within Charlevoix County

- Location within the state of Michigan Location within the United States
- Coordinates: 45°13′00″N 85°22′53″W
- Country: United States
- State: Michigan
- County: Charlevoix
- Township: Norwood
- Settled: 1867

Area
  - Total: 2.03 sq mi (5.26 km^{2})
  - Land: 2.03 sq mi (5.26 km^{2})
  - Water: 0 sq mi (0.00 km^{2})
- Elevation: 656 ft (200 m)

Population (2020)
  - Total: 144
  - Density: 70.9/sq mi (27.37/km^{2})
- Time zone: UTC-5 (Eastern (EST))
  - Summer (DST): UTC-4 (EDT)
- ZIP code(s): 49720 (Charlevoix)
- Area code: 231
- FIPS code: 26-59320
- GNIS feature ID: 0633765

Norwood is an unincorporated community and census-designated place (CDP) in Charlevoix County in the U.S. state of Michigan. The population of the CDP was 144 at the 2020 census. It is located along the shores of Lake Michigan in Norwood Township.

== History ==
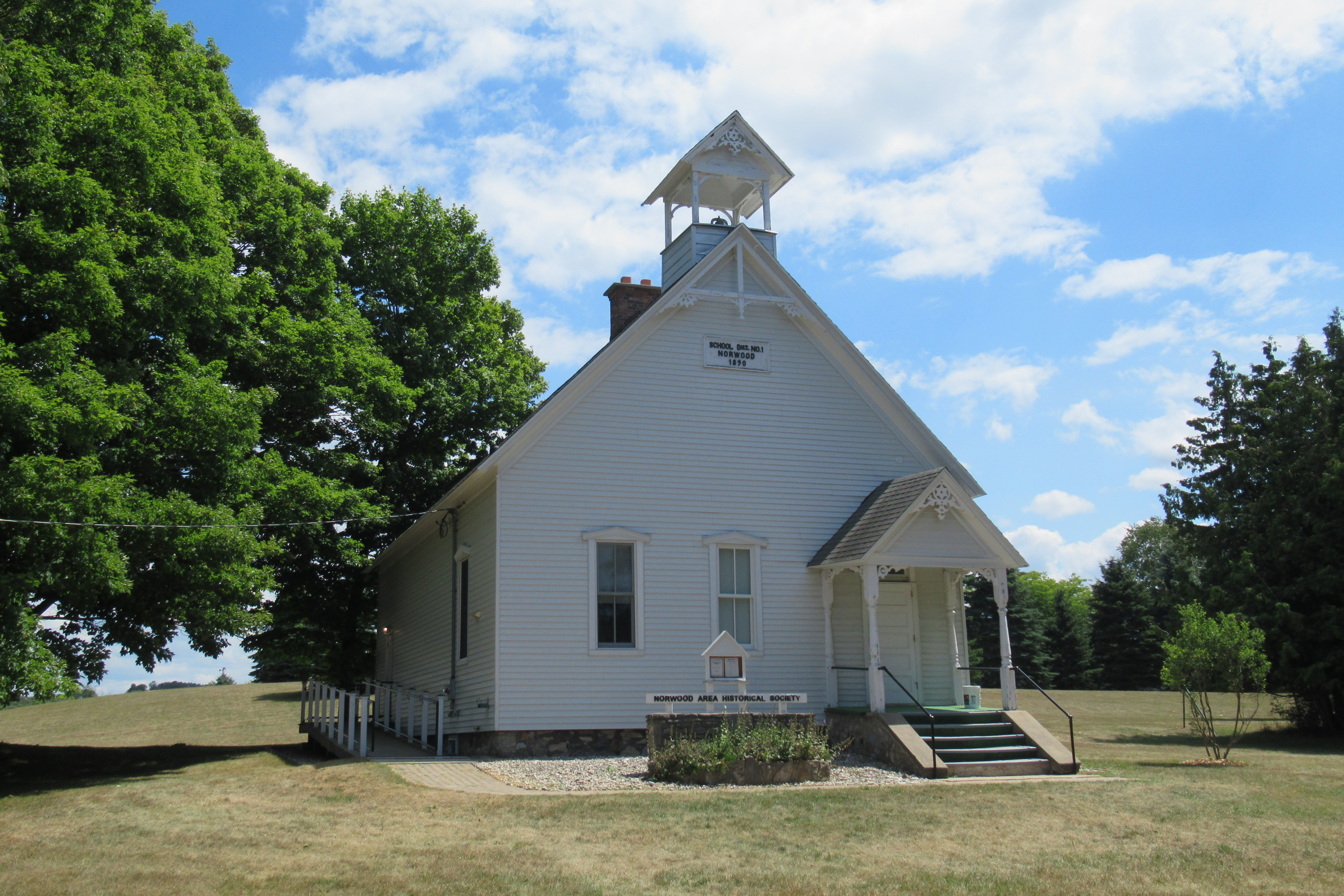
Norwood School

The area was settled as early as 1867 when Orvis Wood and Lucius Pearl, and Orin Adams built a dock and sawmill here. At the time, it was part of Emmet County, as Charlevoix County was not organized in 1869. The following year, William Harris built a hotel, and it became an important shipping location. Harris served as the first postmaster when a post office opened on February 1, 1868. The name Norwood was chosen due to its located in the northern woods. The post office operated until April 30, 1913.

In 1867, the Norwood School District No. 1 was organized. In 1869, a frame schoolhouse was built, and the current structure was built in 1890. Due to low enrollment, the district merged with Charlevoix School District in 1957. The structure then served as a church building. It was purchased and restored to a museum by the Norwood Area Historic Society in 2004. In 2017, the former schoolhouse was dedicated as a Michigan State Historic Site.

The community of Norwood was listed as a newly organized census-designated place for the 2010 census, meaning it now has officially defined boundaries and population statistics for the first time. Norwood uses the Charlevoix 49720 ZIP Code.

== Geography ==
According to the U.S. Census Bureau, the Advance CDP has a total area of 2.03 square miles (5.26 km^{2}), all land.

=== Major highways ===
- US 31 runs south–north near the eastern boundary of the Norwood CDP.

== Demographics ==
Historical population
Census	Pop.	Note	%±
2010	142		—
2020	144		1.4%
U.S. Decennial Census

== Education ==
Norwood is served entirely by Charlevoix Public Schools to the northeast in Charlevoix.

== Notable people ==
- Ding Darling, cartoonist born in Norwood
