= Iowa Lakeside Laboratory Historic District =

Historic district in Iowa, United States

- Iowa Lakeside Laboratory; Historic District
- U.S. National Register of Historic Places
- U.S. Historic district
- Location within Iowa Location within the United States
- Location: Iowa Highway 86 about 4 miles north-northwest of its junction with U.S. Route 71
- Nearest city: Milford, Iowa
- Coordinates: 43°22′48″N 95°11′04″W
- Area: 89 acres (36 ha)
- Built: 1936-1937
- Architectural style: Rustic
- MPS: Conservation Movement in Iowa MPS
- NRHP reference No.: 91001830
- Added to NRHP: December 23, 1991

The Iowa Lakeside Laboratory Historic District is a nationally recognized historic district located north of Milford, Iowa, United States. It was listed on the National Register of Historic Places in 1991. At the time of its nomination it contained 33 resources, which included 11 contributing buildings, one contributing structure, and 21 non-contributing buildings. The historic district is part of a campus that provides science classes and research opportunities for university students.

== History ==
The Iowa Lakeside Laboratory was established in 1909 by three professors from the University of Iowa: Thomas Macbride, Bohumil Shimek, and Samuel Calvin. Their plan was to provide to all students "'competent to enjoy the laboratory method of instruction'; to instruct teachers in both academies of higher learning and in high schools so that they were better prepared to educate children in schools; and to provide a laboratory where graduate students and scholars could pursue advanced research." The facility is the "earliest and one of the most important research and educational institutions associated with the conservation movement."

The first 5 acres (2.0 ha) on West Okoboji Lake was purchased by the University of Iowa Alumni Association who set up a private stock company, the Lakeside Laboratory Association, because the university itself was legally prevented from establishing "branch" campuses. An additional 84 acres (34 ha) were acquired between 1928 and 1930. The property was deeded to the state of Iowa in 1936. In addition to the buildings the district includes about 60 acres (24 ha) of open land to the north and northeast of the building complexes. It is a combination of meadows, marshes, and bogs that have been used in experiments and research projects over the years, and it is considered integral to the historic field laboratory setting.

Iowa Lakeside Laboratory continues to function under the direction of the Iowa Board of Regents. The facility is located on a campus that has grown to 147 acres (59 ha).

== Architecture ==
Contributing buildings include five stone laboratories, a bathhouse, four stone cottages, and the main cottage. The entrance portals are the historic structure. They were built between 1936 and 1937 in the Rustic style by the Civilian Conservation Corps. The historic buildings are distributed across the facility's three areas: the main laboratory complex, the main living/dining quarters, and the lakeshore area. The noncontributing buildings include a classroom building, a modern laboratory building, a storage building, a library, ten wood-frame cottages, the manager's residence, a garage/shop, the dining hall, a converted boathouse, Dodd Cottage, faculty housing, and a modern bathhouse. They were built from the 1960s to the 1980s.
