= Russ McPherson =

Mayor of Cambridge, England

803rd Mayor of Cambridge
- In office 2020–2021
- Deputy: Alex Collis
- Preceded by: Gerri Bird
- Succeeded by: Mark Ashton

Cambridge City Councillor, Cherry Hinton
- In office May 2004 – present

Personal details
- Born: 18 November 1954 (age 71) Cambridge, England
- Party: Labour
- Education: Open University, Cambridge Regional College
- Occupation: Councillor

Russell Neil McPherson (18 November 1954) is a British politician who served as the mayor of Cambridge, England, from May 2020 to 2022, and previously during 2009–10. From May 2004 he has been a councillor of the Cambridge City Council. For 10 years he has been a chair for a Labour Party Group and during 4 years for a Civic Affairs committee. He is also a President Ex Officia of Cambridge Aid financial services.

He graduated as a BA of Psychology from the Open University and completed a teaching qualification at the Cambridge Regional College.

== Awards ==
- 2012: Queen Elizabeth II Diamond Jubilee Medal for work as a Voluntary Community First Responder at the Ambulance Service
- 2017: 10-year award for voluntary service to the Ambulance Service

== See also ==
- List of mayors of Cambridge
