= Lake Darling State Park =

State park in Iowa, U.S.

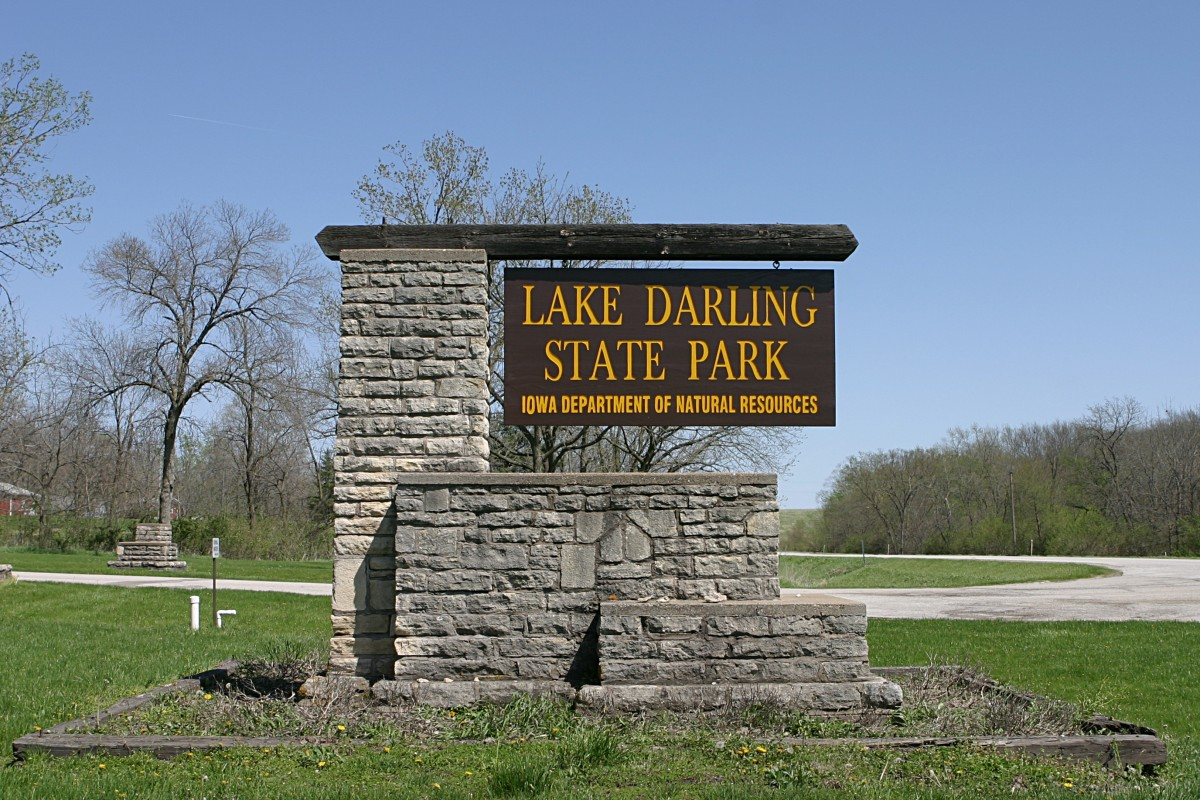

- Location within Iowa Location within the United States
- Location: Washington County, Iowa, United States
- Coordinates: 41°11′41″N 91°53′50″W
- Area: 1,417 acres (573 ha)
- Elevation: 656 ft (200 m)
- Established: 1950
- Administrator: Iowa Department of Natural Resources
- Named for: Jay Norwood Darling
- Website: Official website

Lake Darling
- Location within Iowa
- Location: Washington County, Iowa, US
- Coordinates: 41°12′10″N 91°54′22″W
- Basin countries: United States
- Surface area: 302 acres (1.22 km^{2})
- Surface elevation: 656 ft (200 m)

Lake Darling State Park is a state park in Washington County, Iowa, United States. The park is approximately 3 miles (4.8 km) west of Brighton; 6 miles (9.7 km) east of Richland; and 3 miles (4.8 km) north-west of Pleasant Plain.

Lake Darling is 302 acres (122 ha) and has approximately 18 miles (29 km) of shoreline. It is located on Honey Creek, a minor tributary of the Skunk River. The park as a whole is 1,417 acres (573 ha) in size.

== History ==
Lake Darling State Park was dedicated on September 17, 1950. The park is named after Jay Norwood "Ding" Darling.

== Land usage ==
Lake Darling State Park has a picnic shelter, camping cabins, campsites, restrooms, playground equipment, boat rentals, several trails, and a beach. Lake Darling is also home to a variety of fish.
