= Robert Brigham (died 1349) =

English Member of Parliament

Robert Brigham (died 1349) was an English Member of Parliament.

He was a Member (MP) of the Parliament of England for Cambridge. His wife was named Maud and his son was also a Cambridge MP, Robert Brigham the second.
