= Bohumil Shimek =

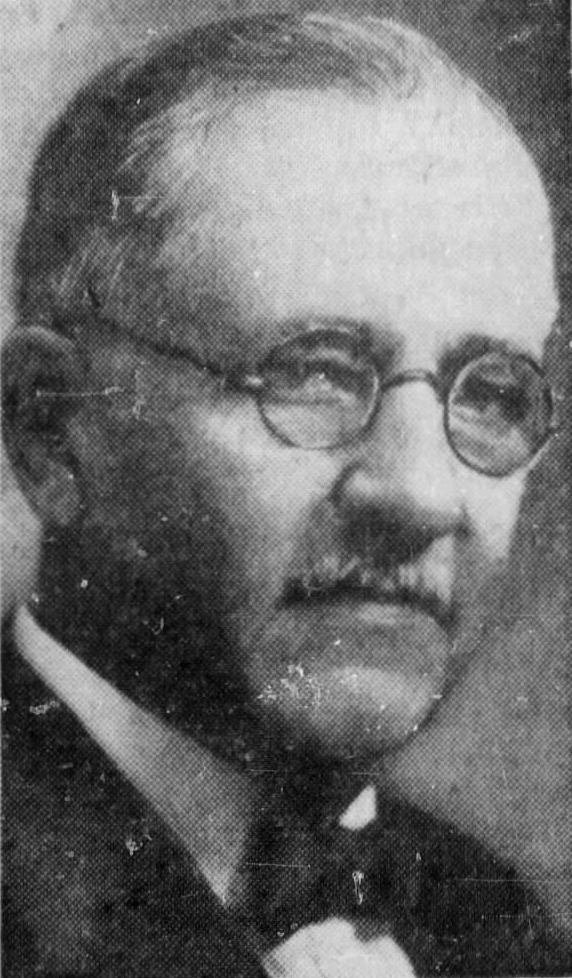
- Bohumil Shimek 1861-1937
- Born: June 25, 1861; Shueyville, Iowa
- Died: January 30, 1937 (aged 75); Iowa City, Iowa
- Occupations: professor, naturalist
- Children: Frank Shimek
- Parent(s): Maria Theresa and Francis Joseph Shimek

Bohumil Shimek (June 25, 1861 – January 30, 1937) was an American naturalist, conservationist, and a professor at the University of Iowa. The Shimek State Forest in Iowa is named after him.

== Life ==
=== Family and early life ===
Shimek was born on a farm near Shueyville, Iowa to Czech Catholic parents František z Pauly Šimek, from Častolovice, and Marie Terezie, née Titová, from Vamberk. They allegedly came to the United States to escape religious and political persecution under the Austrian Empire. In 1866, the family moved to Iowa City to have access to medical care for his mother, who was suffering from tuberculosis. However, she succumbed to the disease soon afterwards. Shimek's father worked as a cobbler. In 1878, Francis Shimek became paralyzed and later died in 1880.

=== Education and career ===
Bohumil Shimek first attended college in 1878 at the University of Iowa as a student of engineering. During this time he became acquainted with Henry Pilsbry and the two would often collect shells together. He graduated from the university in 1883 with a degree in civil engineering, and subsequently worked as a railroad and county surveyor. He later taught of zoology at the University of Nebraska from 1888 to 1890, and later returned to the University of Iowa as an instructor in botany. In 1895, he became Assistant Professor in botany and curator of the herbarium, and he continued in the latter position until his death. In 1902 he was awarded a Master's degree in science. He served as head of the botany department at University of Iowa from 1914 to 1919.

Shimek traveled extensively in North America studying nature, and also spent time traveling in Czechoslovakia, and Nicaragua. He especially traveled extensively throughout the American midwest and throughout every region of Iowa. Records show that between 1925 and 1928 Shimek had collected more than 10,000 specimens in Iowa, Nebraska, South Dakota, Wisconsin and Illinois. It has been estimated that, over his lifetime, Shimek contributed 200,000 specimens of vascular plants and 5,000 specimens of bryophytes to the collection.

He was a member of the Iowa State Geological Board. He was also chairman of the geological section of the International Scientific Congress held in Europe in 1911 as a tribute to his important contributions. The Geological Society of America awarded him a research grant in 1936.

=== Political involvement ===
Shimek worked for the independence of Czechoslovakia. He worked with his personal friend, historian Tomáš Masaryk, who was exiled to the United States. After Czechoslovak independence, Shimek was invited to the Charles University in Prague to teach botany as an exchange professor in 1914. Here he was awarded an honorary Ph.D. in recognition of his scientific contributions. He was also awarded a special Czech medal of honor in 1927.

=== Death ===
In 1932, Shimek retired after teaching for over 46 years. He died in Iowa City, Iowa, on January 30, 1937, of heart complications caused by influenza. He was 75 years old at the time of his death.

His services to Iowa and education were memorialized by the Iowa legislature in a unanimous resolution of tribute, passed after his death, on February 1, 1937.

== Legacy ==
In a series of papers written in 1890, 1896, and 1898, Shimek concluded that wind (rather than water) was responsible for the deposition of loess in eastern and western Iowa. He based this after extensive study of fossils, habitats, and animal/plant life in the area. This discovery proved to be a major contribution to the study of the environment in the region.

Upon his death Shimek's shell collection contained nearly two and a half million specimens, about half of which are loess fossils. This collection was sold to the Smithsonian Institution, according to his wish.

On December 23, 1991, Bohumil Shimek House at 529 Brown Street in Iowa City was listed on the National Register of Historic Places. The Shimek State Forest in southern Iowa is named after him. Additionally an elementary school in Johnson County, Iowa, is named after him and an award was created in his honor – the Bohumil Shimek Environmental Educator Award.
