= Bud Brigham =

American billionaire

Ben M. "Bud" Brigham (born 1959) is an American oil and gas explorer, entrepreneur, and investor.

== Early life ==
Brigham was raised in Midland, Texas, a center for the petroleum and natural gas industries. His father died at a young age, leaving his mother to raise their six children. She worked for oil companies and first introduced Brigham to Ayn Rand’s books, which strongly influenced his philosophy. After high school, Brigham joined the University of Texas at Austin, where in 1983 he graduated with a B.S. in Geophysics.

His first job was in Houston, working as a geophysicist processing seismic data for Western Geophysical, a 3-D seismic services firm. Then he became an exploration geophysicist and spent six years working for Rosewood Resources, an independent oil and gas exploration company.

== Oil & Gas Companies ==
In 1990, with an initial investment of $25,000, Brigham founded Brigham Exploration Company, which pioneered 3D seismic survey techniques for oil and gas exploration, and was its President, Chief Executive Officer, and Chairman. The company grew quickly and issued an initial public offering (IPO) in 1997. In that year, Brigham Exploration moved from Dallas to Austin.

Brigham was a leading player in the Bakken and Three Forks shale plays of the Williston Basin. In 2008, the company was the first operator to drill a long lateral high frac stage well, a key innovation largely responsible for the subsequent surge in fracking across the Bakken and other the U.S. shale oil plays. As a result, the "Bakken boom" in North Dakota quickly doubled in size. Brigham Exploration gained control of some 375,000 acres in the Williston Basin, drilled 100+ horizontal wells, and constructed 800+ miles of pipeline. The company was a first mover in long-lateral wells and 40+ stage completions, achieving an average of 2,800 barrels of oil equivalent per day by December 2011, when the company was sold to Statoil ASA (now Equinor) for $4.7 billion. After that, the assets previously owned by Brigham Exploration continued to achieve high growth in reserves, production, and income.

Following the sale, Brigham founded Anthem Ventures and continued to seed and incubate oil and gas companies. In 2012, Brigham teamed with others to found Brigham Resources and Brigham Minerals. Brigham Resources was an early mover in the Southern Delaware Basin and was sold in February 2017 to Diamondback Energy Inc. for $2.55 billion. Brigham Minerals (NYSE: MNRL) went public in April 2019 and merged with Sitio Royalties (NYSE: STR) in December 2022 for a combined enterprise value of $4.8 billion. In 2017, Brigham founded and continues to serve as the Executive Chairman of Atlas Energy Solutions (NYSE: AESI), a frac sand miner. Atlas went public in 2023 with a market capitalization of $1.8 billion, continues to trade on the NYSE today, and is the largest proppant producer in the United States. Brigham also founded a new Brigham Exploration in 2017, co-founded Langford Energy Partners with Lance Langford in 2021, and most recently co-founded Brigham Royalties with Rob Roosa in 2023. Brigham Exploration pursues a non-operated oil and gas acquisition and development strategy in the Permian Basin; Langford Energy Partners pursues an operated oil and gas acquisition, optimization, and development strategy in liquids-rich shale resources plays; and Brigham Royalties pursues a mineral and royalty acquisition strategy in liquids-rich shale resource plays.

== Philanthropy ==
In April 2015, Brigham joined the University of Texas Chancellor’s Council Executive Committee.

In 2021, it was reported that for some years Brigham had been driving the creation of a new think tank at Austin to promote limited government, individual freedom, and free markets, provisionally named as the "Liberty Institute". Others supporting this project were Lieutenant Governor of Texas Dan Patrick and Robert B. Rowling.

Brigham is a supporter of the philosophy of Ayn Rand and was reported to drive a Bronco SUV with a bumper sticker reading "Who is John Galt?” echoing her novel Atlas Shrugged. He has also made forceful criticisms of the state of higher education and of climate science.

Brigham has been involved in various other philanthropic initiatives, such as the Texas Public Policy Foundation, Texas McCombs Salem Center for Policy, and the Ayn Rand Institute, including the contribution of Ayn Rand novels to teachers and students.
