= Lincoln F. Brigham =

American judiciary (1819–1895)

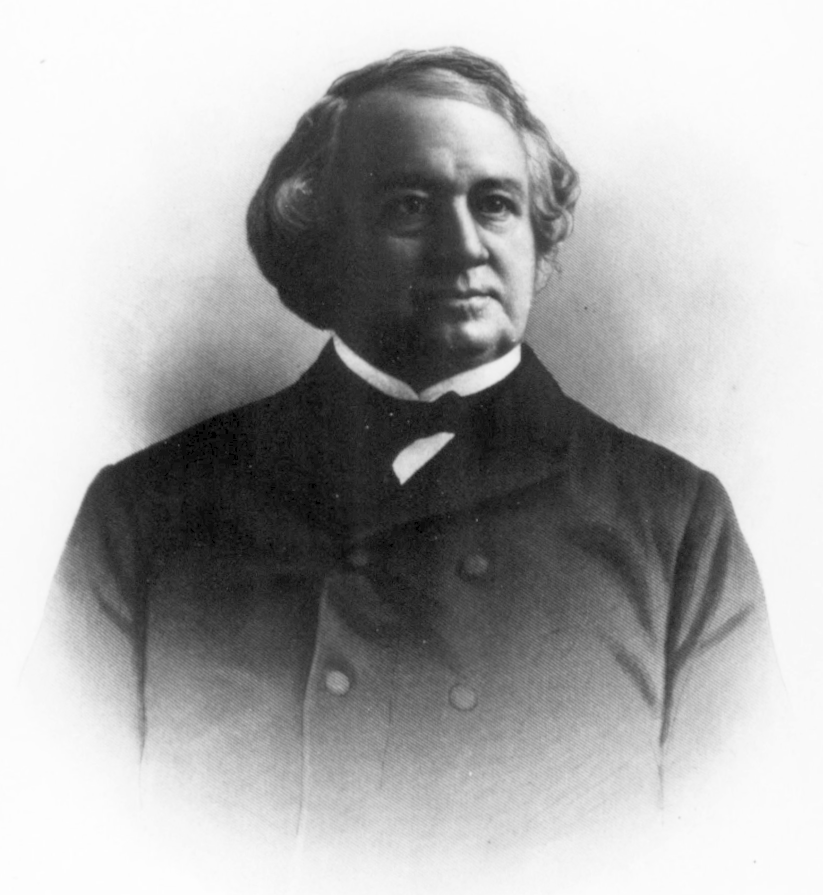
- Born: Lincoln Flagg Brigham; October 4, 1819; Cambridge, Massachusetts
- Died: February 27, 1895 (aged 75); Salem, Massachusetts
- Education: Dartmouth College; Harvard Law School
- Occupation: Jurist
- Spouse: Eliza Endicott (m. 1847)
- Children: 4

Signature
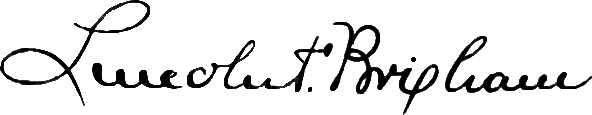

Lincoln Flagg Brigham (October 4, 1819 – February 27, 1895) was the Chief Justice of the Superior Court of Massachusetts from 1869 to 1890.

== Professional life ==
After graduating from Dartmouth College in 1842, Brigham studied law at Harvard University's Dane School of Law until 1844, at which point he began working at the law firm of John H. Clifford and Harrison Colby. In 1845, Colby became a judge, and Clifford made Brigham his new partner. When Clifford was elected Governor of Massachusetts in 1853, he appointed Brigham District Attorney of the Southern District of Massachusetts (Bristoll, Barnstable, Dukes, and Nantucket counties). In 1856, the position of District Attorney became elective, and Brigham was the first person elected to it. In 1859, the Superior Court of Massachusetts was established, and Nathaniel P. Banks appointed Brigham as an associate justice; in 1869, Seth Ames left the Superior Court for the Supreme Court of Massachusetts, and William Claflin named Brigham Ames' successor as Chief Justice.

In 1890, Brigham retired from the court, due to health issues.

== Personal life ==
Lincoln Brigham was born in Cambridge, Massachusetts on October 4, 1819 to Lincoln and Lucy (Forbes) Brigham. He was married to Eliza Endicott on October 20, 1847 in New Bedford, Massachusetts. The couple had four children; Thomas Swain, Clifford, Augustus Perry, and Lincoln Forbes Brigham. He died in Salem, Massachusetts on February 27, 1895.
