= Lord Alfred Paget =

British soldier, courtier and Liberal politician (1816–1888)

Lord Alfred Paget CB
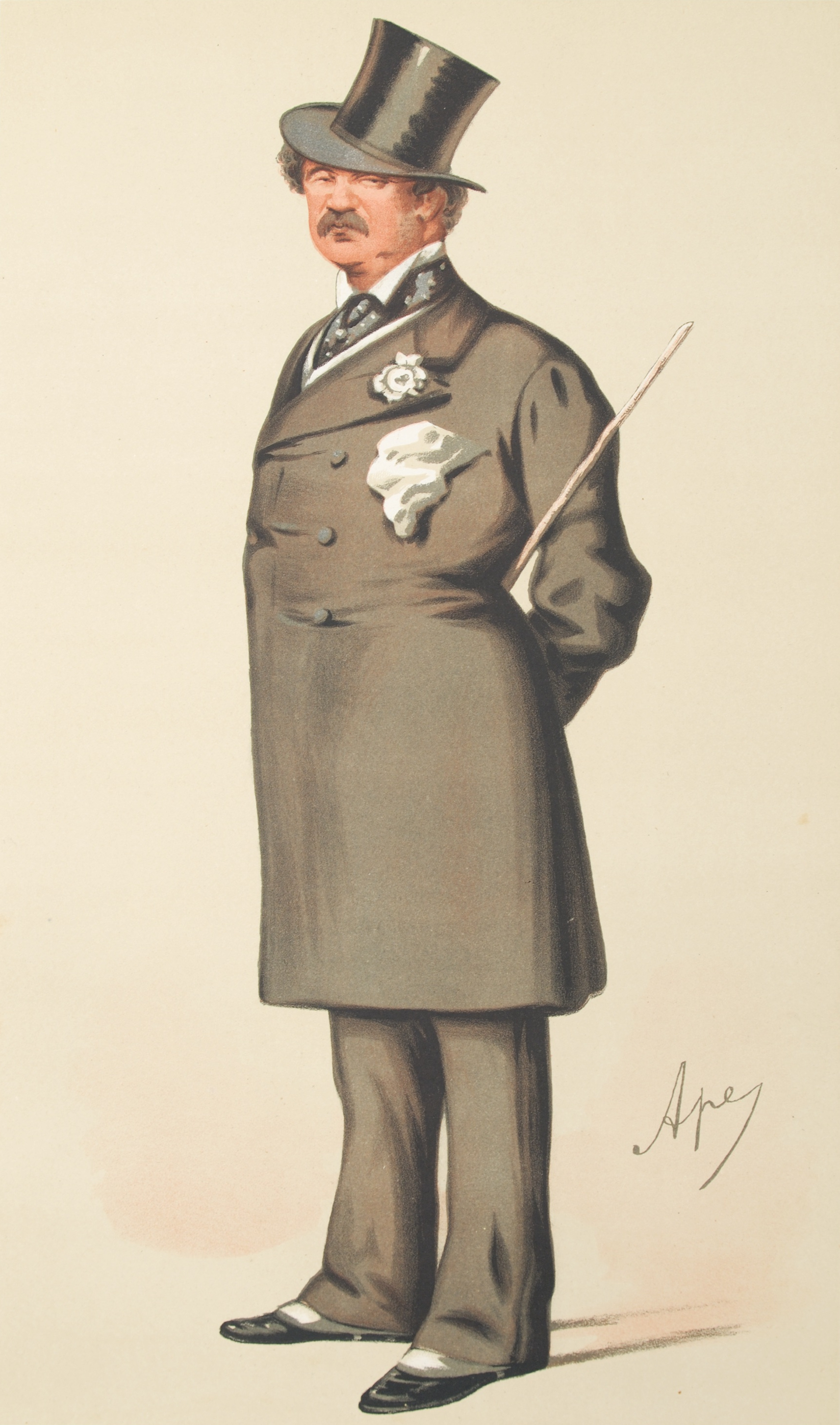
- Caricature by Ape published in Vanity Fair in 1875.

Member of Parliament for Lichfield
- In office 1837–1865 Serving with Sir George Anson, Lord Levson, Edward Lloyd-Mostyn, Viscount Anson, Lord Waterpark, Viscount Sandon, Augustus Anson
- Preceded by: Sir Edward Scott, Bt; Sir George Anson
- Succeeded by: Richard Dyott; Augustus Anson

Personal details
- Born: 26 June 1816
- Died: 24 August 1888 (aged 72) Inverness, Scotland
- Party: Liberal
- Spouse: Cecilia Wyndham (after 1847)
- Children: 14
- Parent(s): Henry Paget, 1st Marquess of Anglesey; Hon. Charlotte Cadogan

Lord Alfred Henry Paget CB (26 June 1816 – 24 August 1888) was a British soldier, courtier and Liberal politician who sat in the House of Commons between 1837 and 1865.

== Early life ==
Paget was the sixth son of William Paget, the 1st Marquess of Anglesey and the former Hon. Charlotte Cadogan. Among his siblings were Lady Emily Paget (wife of John Townshend, 1st Earl Sydney), Lord Clarence Paget, Lady Mary Paget (wife of John Montagu, 7th Earl of Sandwich), Lord George Paget, and Lady Adelaide Paget (wife of Frederick William Cadogan).

From his father's first marriage to Lady Caroline Villiers (a daughter of George Villiers, 4th Earl of Jersey and later, Duchess of Argyll), he had several older half-siblings, including Lady Caroline Paget (wife of Charles Gordon-Lennox, 5th Duke of Richmond), Henry Paget, 2nd Marquess of Anglesey, Lady Jane Paget (wife of Francis Conyngham, 2nd Marquess Conyngham), Lady Georgina Paget (wife of Edward Crofton, 2nd Baron Crofton), Lady Augusta Paget (wife of Arthur Chichester, 1st Baron Templemore), Lord William Paget, Lady Agnes Paget (wife of George Byng, 2nd Earl of Strafford). From his mother's first marriage to Henry Wellesley, 1st Baron Cowley, he had four half-siblings, including Henry Wellesley, 1st Earl Cowley, William Henry George Wellesley, Hon. Charlotte Wellesley (wife of Robert Grosvenor, 1st Baron Ebury), and Gerald Valerian Wellesley.

== Career ==
Portrait by Francis Grant, 1859

He became a lieutenant in the Royal Horse Guards. In 1837 he was elected Member of Parliament for Lichfield and held the seat until 1865, when he was defeated by the Conservative Richard Dyott.

Paget was Chief Equerry and Clerk Marshal to Queen Victoria from July 1846 to March 1852, from December 1852 to March 1858, and from June 1859. The office ceased to be a political one from 1866.

He was the Commodore of the Royal Thames Yacht Club, 1846–1873, and Vice-Commodore, 1845-1846 and 1874–1888.

On 1 August 1874, he resigned the Chief Equerryship only. He became a Lieutenant-Colonel (unattached) in 1854.

Paget was a director of the North Staffordshire Railway Company between January 1854 and February 1875.

== Personal life ==
In 1847, Paget was married to Cecilia Wyndham (1829–1914), second daughter and co-heiress of George Thomas Wyndham, of Cromer Hall, Norfolk. Their children were:

- Victoria Alexandrina Paget (1848–1859)
- Evelyn Cecilia Paget (1849–1904)
- Sir Arthur Henry Fitzroy Paget (1851–1928), who married American heiress Mary Fiske “Minnie” Stevens In 1878.
- Alfred Wyndham Paget (1852–1918)
- George Thomas Cavendish Paget (1853–1939), raised Paget's Horse for service in the Boer War.
- Gerald Cecil Stewart Paget (1854–1913), grandfather of Percy Bernard, 5th Earl of Bandon.
- Violet Mary Paget (1856–1908)
- Sydney Augustus Paget (1857–1916)
- Amy Olivia Paget (1858–1948)
- Alberta Victoria Paget (1859–1945)
- Almeric Hugh Paget, 1st Baron Queenborough (1861–1949), who married Pauline Payne Whitney in 1895. After her death in 1916, he married Edith Starr Miller in 1921.
- Alice Maud Paget (1862–1925)
- Alexandra Harriet Paget (1863–1944), who married Edward Colebrooke, 1st Baron Colebrooke.
- Guinevere Eva Paget (1869–1894)

He lived at 42 Grosvenor Place, London, and at Melford Hall, Sudbury, Suffolk. He died in 1888 unexpectedly, on his yacht off Inverness.

== In popular culture ==
In the television series Victoria, Lord Alfred is played by Jordan Waller. In the second series, he was depicted having a same-sex romantic relationship with Sir Robert Peel's secretary, Edward Drummond. There is no historical evidence that this took place. In the same series, Lord Alfred marries Lady Wilhelmina Coke (the niece of the Duchess of Buccleuch); but in real life, Lord Alfred married Cecilia Wyndham.

Parliament of the United Kingdom
Preceded by Sir Edward Scott, Bt; Sir George Anson	Member of Parliament for Lichfield; 1837–1865; With: Sir George Anson to 1841; Lord Levson 1841–1846; Edward Lloyd-Mostyn 1846–1847; Viscount Anson 1847–1854; Lord Waterpark 1854–1856; Viscount Sandon 1856–1859; Augustus Anson from 1859	Succeeded by Richard Dyott; Augustus Anson
Court offices
Preceded by Lord Charles Wellesley	Chief Equerry and Clerk Marshal; 1846–1852	Succeeded by The Lord Colville of Culross
Preceded by The Lord Colville of Culross	Chief Equerry and Clerk Marshal; 1852–1858	Succeeded by The Lord Colville of Culross
Preceded by The Lord Colville of Culross	Chief Equerry and Clerk Marshal; 1859–1874	Succeeded by John Carstairs McNeill
