= Lord George Paget =

British Army general

General Lord George Paget KCB
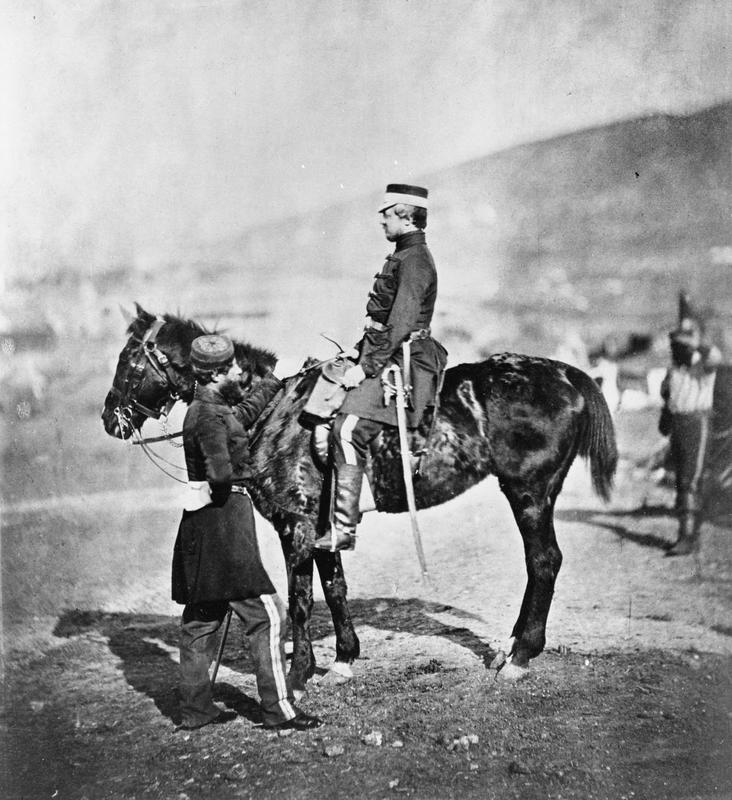
- Paget on horseback during the Crimean War

Member of Parliament for Beaumaris
- In office 1847–1857
- Preceded by: Frederick Paget
- Succeeded by: William Owen Stanley

Personal details
- Born: George Augustus Frederick Paget; 16 March 1818
- Died: 30 June 1880 (aged 62) Mayfair, London
- Spouses: Agnes Charlotte Paget (m. 1854; died 1858) Louisa Elizabeth Heneage (m. 1861)
- Children: 2
- Parent(s): Henry Paget, 1st Marquess of Anglesey; Lady Charlotte Cadogan
- Relatives: Charles Cadogan, 1st Earl Cadogan (grandfather)

Military service
- Allegiance: United Kingdom
- Branch/service: British Army
- Rank: General
- Commands: 4th (The Queen's Own) Light Dragoons
- Battles/wars: Crimean War: Battle of Balaclava

General Lord George Augustus Frederick Paget KCB (16 March 1818 – 30 June 1880) was a British soldier during the Crimean War who took part in the famous Charge of the Light Brigade. He later became a Whig politician.

== Early life ==
Lord George Augustus Frederick Paget was born on 16 March 1818. Paget was the youngest son of Henry Paget, 1st Marquess of Anglesey by his second wife Lady Charlotte, daughter of Charles Cadogan, 1st Earl Cadogan. Among his siblings were Lady Emily (wife of John Townshend, 1st Earl Sydney), Lord Clarence Paget, Lady Mary Paget (wife of John Montagu, 7th Earl of Sandwich), Lord Alfred Paget (MP for Lichfield), and Lady Adelaide Paget (wife of Frederick William Cadogan).

He was educated at Westminster School.

His parents were both previously married, and divorced; his father to Lady Caroline Villiers (later the Duchess of Argyll), and his mother to Henry Wellesley (later 1st Baron Cowley). From his mother's previous marriage, his elder half-siblings included Hon. Charlotte Wellesley (wife of Robert Grosvenor, 1st Baron Ebury), Henry Wellesley, 1st Earl Cowley, and the Very Rev. Hon. Gerald Valerian Wellesley. From his father's previous marriage, his elder half-siblings included Lady Caroline Paget (wife of Charles Gordon-Lennox, 5th Duke of Richmond), Henry Paget, 2nd Marquess of Anglesey, Lady Jane Paget (wife of Francis Conyngham, 2nd Marquess Conyngham), Lady Georgina Paget (wife of Edward Crofton, 2nd Baron Crofton), Lady Augusta Paget (wife of Arthur Chichester, 1st Baron Templemore), Lord William Paget, and Lady Agnes Paget (wife of George Byng, 2nd Earl of Strafford).

In 1834 he travelled on a Grand Tour to Greece and Asia Minor under the supervision of Rv. Richard Burgess, together with John Butler Clarke (1813-1856), and Thomas Knox.

== Career ==
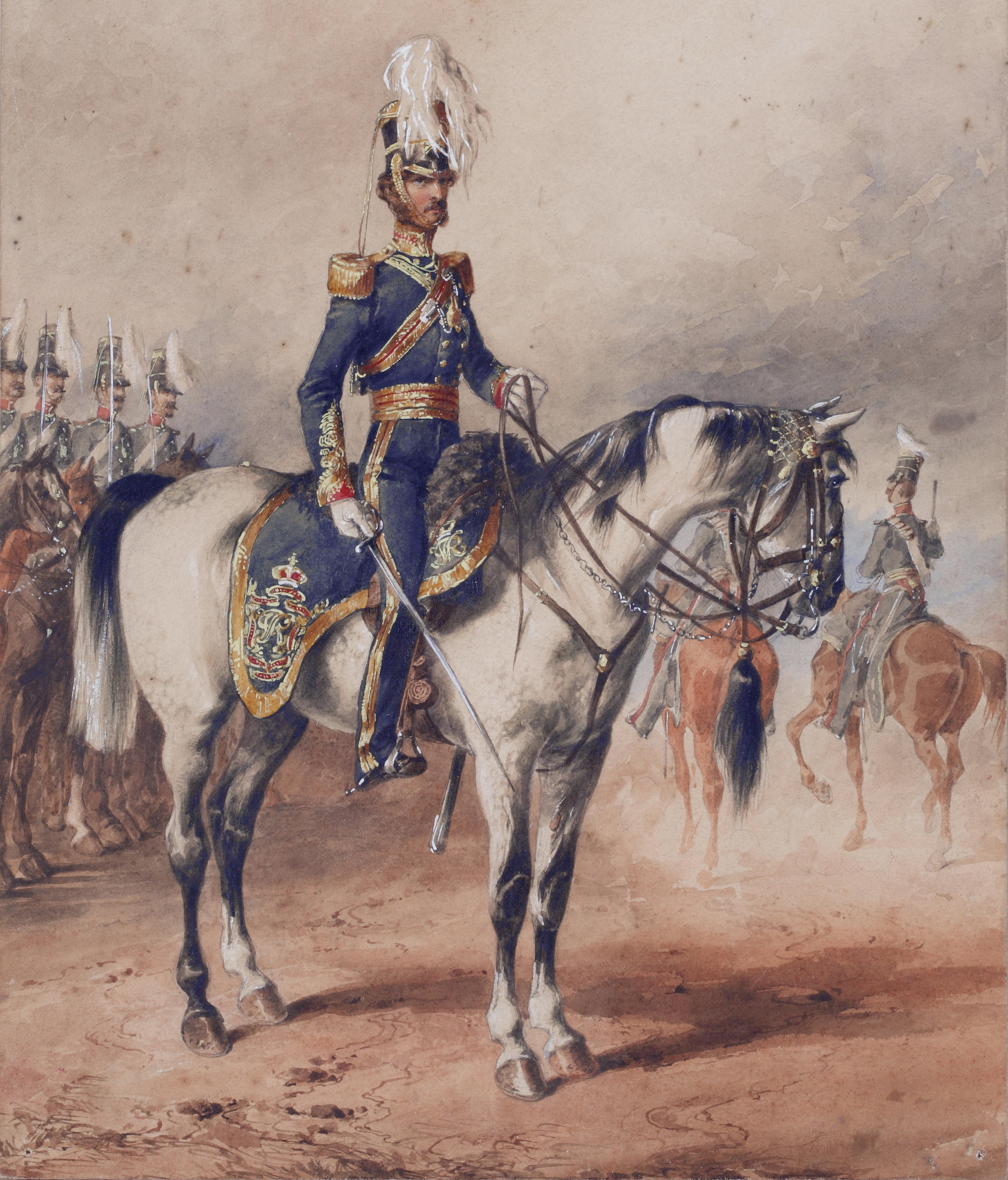
M. A. Hayes, Paget in the Light Dragoons (1850)

Paget served in the Crimean War and fought at Alma and Balaclava in command of the 4th (The Queen's Own) Light Dragoons. He is frequently quoted for his references to the Russian engagement in Balaklava on the Crimean Peninsula: "Every fool at the outposts, who fancies he hears something, has only to make a row, and there we all are, Generals and all... Well I suppose 500 false alarms are better than one surprise". This quote was supposedly written just before the Russians surprised the camp. He is famous for having charged with the Light Brigade while smoking a cheroot (a type of cigar favoured by soldiers who served in India).

=== Member of Parliament ===
Apart from his military career, Paget sat in Westminster as the Member of Parliament (MP) for Beaumaris between 1847 and 1857. He was made a KCB in 1870.

== Personal life ==
On 27 February 1854, Paget married his first cousin Agnes Charlotte Paget, daughter of Sir Arthur Paget. They had two sons.

After her death on 10 March 1858, just six days after the birth of her child, he married, secondly, Louisa Elizabeth, daughter of Charles Fieschi Heneage, in 1861.

== Death ==
Paget died at his residence in Farm Street, Mayfair, London, in June 1880, aged 62. His widow remarried, as his third wife, to Arthur Capell, 6th Earl of Essex, in 1881. She died in January 1914.

Parliament of the United Kingdom
Preceded by Frederick Paget	Member of Parliament for Beaumaris; 1847–1857	Succeeded by William Owen Stanley
