= Charlotte Paget, Marchioness of Anglesey =

British noblewoman (1781–1853)

The Most Honourable The Marchioness of Anglesey

Personal details
- Born: Charlotte Sloane Cadogan; 10 July 1781
- Died: 8 July 1853 (aged 71)
- Spouses: Henry Wellesley (m. 1803; div. 1810) Henry Paget (m. 1810)
- Children: 10
- Parent(s): Charles Cadogan, 1st Earl Cadogan; Mary Churchill
- Relatives: George Cadogan, 3rd Earl Cadogan (brother); Henry Cadogan (brother); Charles Cadogan, 2nd Earl Cadogan (half-brother); Charles Cadogan, 2nd Baron Cadogan (grandfather); Charles Churchill (grandfather)

Charlotte Sloane Paget, Marchioness of Anglesey (née Cadogan; 10 July 1781 – 8 July 1853), formerly known as Lady Charlotte Wellesley, was the second wife of Henry Paget, 1st Marquess of Anglesey.

== Early life ==
She was the daughter of the former Mary Churchill and Charles Cadogan, 1st Earl Cadogan, MP for Cambridge and Master of the Mint. Among her siblings were Henry Cadogan (who was killed at the Battle of Vitoria), George Cadogan, 3rd Earl Cadogan, and Lady Emily Cadogan (who married Gerald Valerian Wellesley, a brother of her first husband, both sons of Garret Wesley, 1st Earl of Mornington). Her father's first wife was the former Frances Bromley (a daughter of Henry Bromley, 1st Baron Montfort) and from that marriage, she had several older half-siblings, including Charles Cadogan, 2nd Earl Cadogan, Rev. William Cadogan, Thomas Cadogan (a naval officer lost at sea aboard HMS Glorieux), and George Cadogan (who was killed in India while an officer in the HEIC Army).

Her father was the only son of Charles Cadogan, 2nd Baron Cadogan and the former Elizabeth Sloane (the second daughter of Sir Hans Sloane, 1st Baronet). Her maternal grandparents were Charles Churchill, MP for Stockbridge and Great Marlow, and the former Lady Mary Walpole (a daughter of Prime Minister Robert Walpole, later the 1st Earl of Orford). Her mother was a niece of John Churchill, 1st Duke of Marlborough.

In 1800, her father was raised to the peerage as the first Earl Cadogan, and Charlotte was afforded the courtesy title of Lady Charlotte as the daughter of an Earl.

== Personal life ==
On 20 September 1803, Lady Charlotte was married to Henry Wellesley, the fifth and youngest son of Garret Wellesley, 1st Earl of Mornington and Anne Hill-Trevor (eldest daughter of Arthur Hill-Trevor, 1st Viscount Dungannon), later 1st Baron Cowley. He was the younger brother of Arthur Wellesley, 1st Duke of Wellington, Richard Wellesley, 1st Marquess Wellesley and William Wellesley-Pole, 3rd Earl of Mornington. Together, they were the parents of four children:

- Henry Wellesley, 1st Earl Cowley (1804–1884), who married Olivia Cecilia FitzGerald, a daughter of the 20th Baroness de Ros and Lord Henry FitzGerald (fourth son of the 1st Duke of Leinster).
- Captain William Henry George Wellesley (1806–1875), who married Amelia St John Niblock, daughter of Rev. Joseph White Niblock.
- Charlotte Arbuthnot Wellesley (1807–1891), who married Robert Grosvenor, 1st Baron Ebury.
- Gerald Valerian Wellesley (1809–1882), who married Magdalen Montagu, third daughter of Henry Montagu, 6th Baron Rokeby.

=== Divorce and second marriage ===
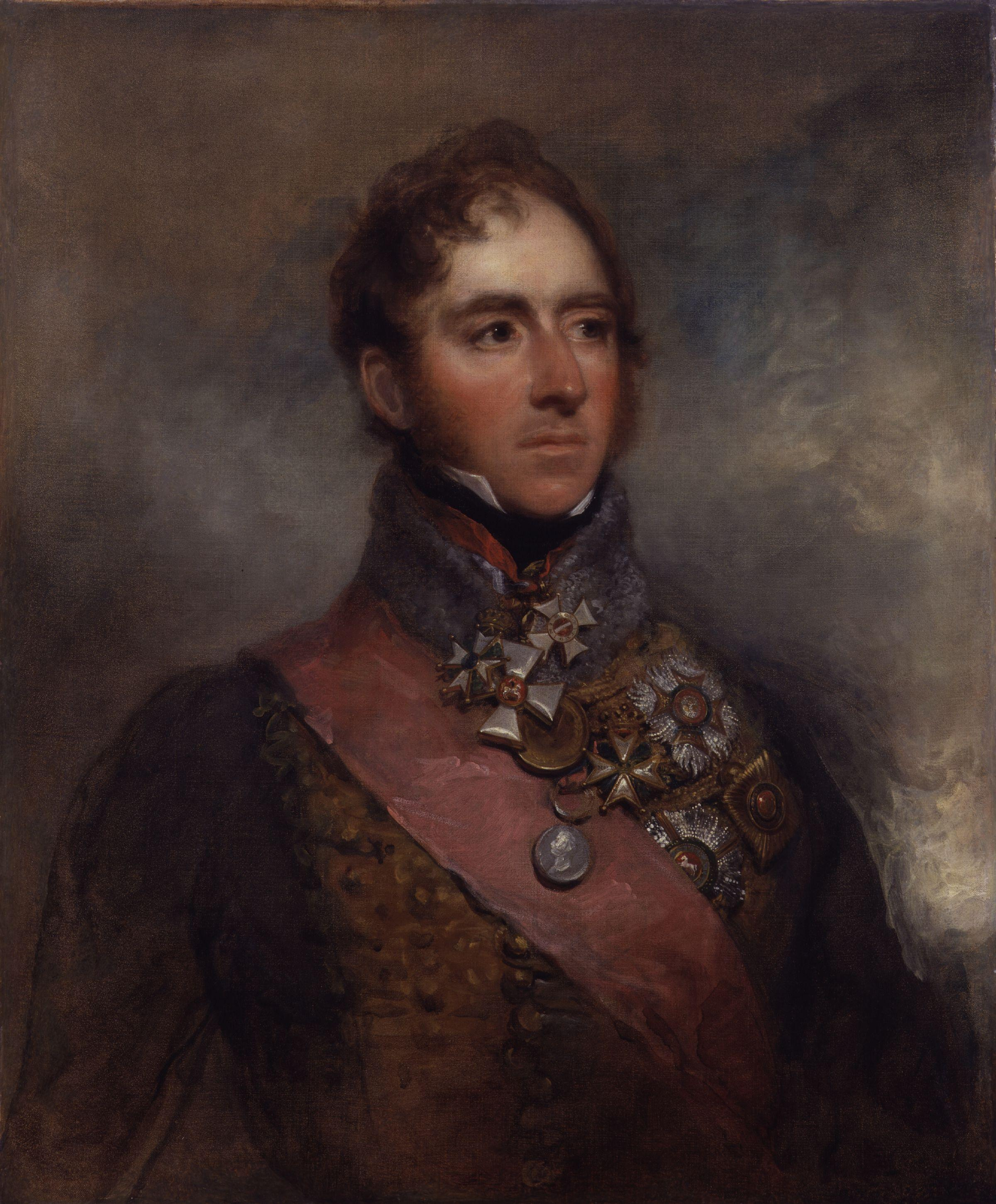
The Marquess of Anglesey, by George Dawe

Wellesley divorced Charlotte by a private act of Parliament, Wellesley's Divorce Act 1810 (50 Geo. 3. c. 1 Pr.), on the grounds of her adultery with Lord Paget (the eldest son of Henry Paget, 1st Earl of Uxbridge). It was claimed that Paget had pursued her ruthlessly and that she had asked her husband to stay close to her in public "for the express purpose of avoiding Lord P's importunities".

At the divorce trial, several witnesses stated that the couple had an affectionate relationship. Charlotte's brother Henry Cadogan challenged Paget to a duel; honour was satisfied, though neither was injured. Following the divorce, Wellesley was awarded £24,000 in damages against Paget. Referring to the incident in later years, when Paget, now Lord Uxbridge, was assigned to Wellington as his second-in-command at the Battle of Waterloo, Wellington is said to have commented: "Lord Uxbridge has the reputation of running away with everybody he can. I’ll take good care he don’t run away with me.”

In 1810, following Paget's divorce by his wife Caroline, Lady Charlotte and Paget were married. Together, Charlotte and her second husband had ten children, of whom seven survived infancy, including:

- Lady Emily Caroline Paget (1810–1893), who married John Townshend, 1st Earl Sydney.
- Admiral Lord Sir Clarence Edward Paget (1811–1895), who married Martha Stuart, the youngest daughter of Admiral Sir Robert Otway.
- Lady Mary Paget (1812–1859), who married John Montagu, 7th Earl of Sandwich.
- General Lord Alfred Henry Paget (1816–1888), MP for Lichfield who married Cecilia Wyndham, second daughter and co-heiress of George Thomas Wyndham of Cromer Hall.
- General Lord George Augustus Frederick Paget (1818–1880), who married his first cousin Agnes Charlotte, daughter of Sir Arthur Paget. After her death, he married Louisa Elizabeth Heneage, daughter of Charles Fieschi Heneage. After he died in 1880, his widow remarried to Arthur Capell, 6th Earl of Essex.
- Lady Adelaide Paget (1820–1890), who married Frederick William Cadogan, a son of George Cadogan, 3rd Earl Cadogan. As Lady Adelaide Cadogan, she wrote the first book of Patience in English.

Her second husband succeeded his father as Earl of Uxbridge on 13 March 1812, and Lady Charlotte became the Countess of Uxbridge and upon his elevation to a marquessate on 4 July 1815, she became the Marchioness of Anglesey. In January 1828, many years after their divorce and Wellesley's remarriage, he was created Baron Cowley of Wellesley in the County of Somerset, due to his brother's influence with the prime minister, Lord Goderich.

The Marchioness of Anglesey died on 8 July 1853. Her widower, the Marquess of Anglesey, died at Uxbridge House in London on 29 April 1854.
