= Caroline Campbell, Duchess of Argyll =

British noble (1774–1835)

Her Grace The Duchess of Argyll
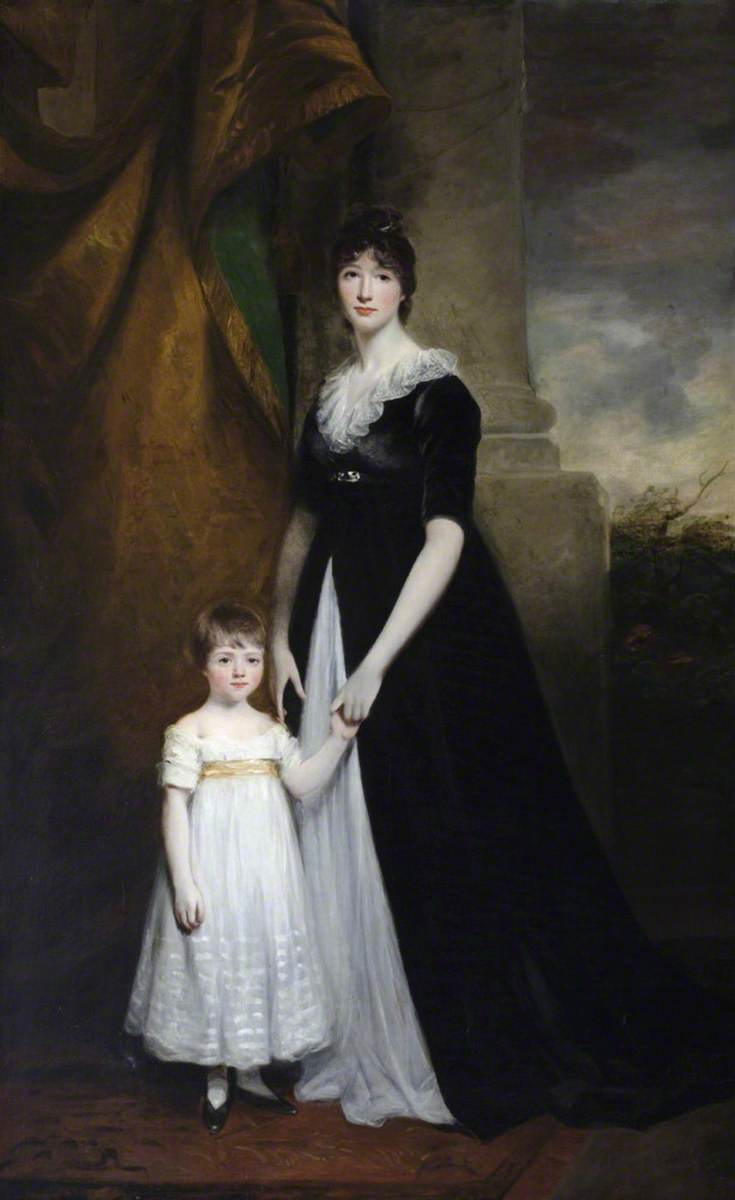
- Lady Paget and her son, Henry, by John Hoppner, c. 1800
- Born: Caroline Elizabeth Villiers; 16 December 1774
- Died: 16 June 1835 (aged 60); Dumbarton, Scotland
- Spouses: Henry Paget, Lord Paget (m. 1795; div. 1810) George Campbell, 6th Duke of Argyll (m. 1810)
- Issue: Caroline Gordon-Lennox, Duchess of Richmond; Henry Paget, 2nd Marquess of Anglesey; Jane Conyngham, Marchioness Conyngham; Georgiana Crofton, Baroness Crofton; Augusta Templemore, Baroness Templemore; Lord William Paget; Agnes Byng, Countess of Stafford; Lord Arthur Paget
- Father: George Villiers, 4th Earl of Jersey
- Mother: Frances Twysden

Caroline Campbell, Duchess of Argyll (born Lady Caroline Elizabeth Villiers; 16 December 1774 – 16 June 1835), previously Lady Paget, was the wife of Henry Paget, Lord Paget (later 1st Marquess of Anglesey), until their divorce in 1810, and subsequently the wife of George Campbell, 6th Duke of Argyll, a friend of her first husband.

== Early life ==
She was the third daughter of George Villiers, 4th Earl of Jersey, a former MP who became a courtier to King George III after he inherited the earldom, and Frances Twysden. Her mother was one of the mistresses of King George IV.

Her paternal grandparents were William Villiers, 3rd Earl of Jersey, and the former Anne Russell, Duchess of Bedford (who was born Lady Anne Egerton, and was the widow of Wriothesley Russell, 3rd Duke of Bedford, before she married Lord Jersey in 1733). Her maternal grandparents were The Rt Revd Dr Philip Twysden, Bishop of Raphoe, and his second wife, Frances Carter (later wife of General James Johnston).

== Personal life ==
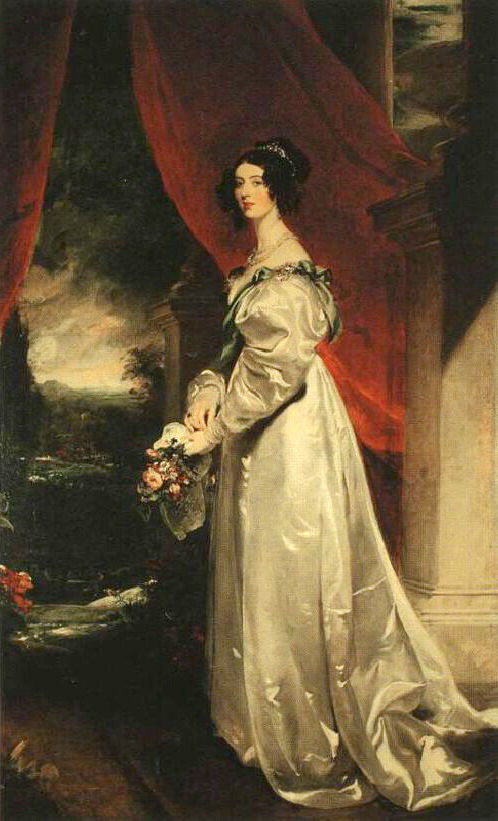
Her eldest daughter. Lady Caroline, later Duchess of Richmond. by Thomas Lawrence, c. 1829.

On 25 July 1795 at the home of her father in Grosvenor Square, Mayfair, London, Lady Caroline was married to Henry, styled Lord Paget, who at that time was MP for Carnarvon. He was the eldest son of Henry Bayley-Paget, 1st Earl of Uxbridge, and the former Jane Champagné (a daughter of the Very Revd Arthur Champagné, Dean of Clonmacnoise, Ireland). Together, they had eight children:

- Lady Caroline Paget (1796–1874), who married Charles Gordon-Lennox, 5th Duke of Richmond, son of the 4th Duke of Richmond and Lady Charlotte Gordon (eldest child of the 4th Duke of Gordon)
- Henry Paget, 2nd Marquess of Anglesey (1797–1869), who married Eleanora Campbell, granddaughter of John Campbell, 5th Duke of Argyll
- Lady Jane Paget (1798–1876), who married Francis Conyngham, 2nd Marquess Conyngham
- Lady Georgina Paget (1800–1875), who married Edward Crofton, 2nd Baron Crofton
- Lady Augusta Paget (1802–1872), who married Arthur Chichester, 1st Baron Templemore
- Captain Lord William Paget (1803–1873), who married Frances de Rottenburg, daughter of Francis de Rottenburg
- Lady Agnes Paget (1804–1845), who married George Byng, 2nd Earl of Strafford
- Lord Arthur Paget (1805–1825)

A portrait of Caroline with her son Henry, painted in 1800 by John Hoppner, is held at her former marital home of Plas Newydd, now in the care of the National Trust.

In 1810, prior to Paget's elevation to the peerage, the couple were divorced as a result of his affair with Lady Charlotte Wellesley, whose husband, Henry Wellesley, 1st Baron Cowley, was the brother of the Duke of Wellington. Charlotte's brother Henry Cadogan challenged Paget to a duel, but neither was hurt.

Caroline then sued her husband for divorce in the Scottish courts. A divorce was granted in November 1810.

=== Second marriage ===
Her second marriage, to George Campbell, 6th Duke of Argyll, took place at Canongate, Edinburgh, only three weeks later. It was the duke's only marriage, and there were no children. The duchess is supposed to have told Paget's brother that she had never previously known "the superlative degree of bliss which she was now enjoying".

The duchess died in Dumbarton, Scotland, aged 60, and was buried at Kensal Green Cemetery, London.

=== Descendants ===
Through her eldest daughter Caroline, she is a direct ancestor of Diana, Princess of Wales, and of her sons, William, Prince of Wales, and Prince Harry, Duke of Sussex.
