= Henry Cadogan (British Army officer) =

British Army officer (1780-1813)

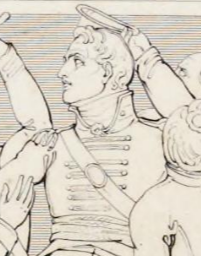
Cadogan represented in a memorial to him, being held up by his men after being wounded

Lieutenant-Colonel Henry Cadogan (26 February 1780 – 21 June 1813) was a British Army officer who served and died during the Peninsular War (1807 – 1814).

== Life ==
He was the seventh son of Charles Cadogan, 1st Earl Cadogan by his second wife Mary Churchill, daughter of Charles Churchill and Lady Mary Walpole, granddaughter of Robert Walpole. Educated at Eton, on 9 August 1797 he became an ensign, by purchase, in the 18th Royal Irish Foot, which corps he joined at Gibraltar after its return from Tuscany, and obtained his lieutenancy therein in 1798. In 1799, having purchased a company in the 60th Regiment of Foot, he exchanged as lieutenant and captain to the Coldstream Guards, and served therein until promoted to a majority in the 53rd Regiment of Foot in 1804. On 22 August 1805 he became lieutenant-colonel in the 2nd battalion (afterwards disbanded) of his old corps, the 18th Royal Irish, having purchased every step. After serving with the battalion in Scotland and the Channel Islands, he left it when it proceeded to the island of Curaçao, and exchanged, in 1808, to the 71st Highlanders at home. During the early part of the Peninsular War, Cadogan served as aide-de-camp to Sir Arthur Wellesley, and after the passage of the Douro was selected by him to proceed to the headquarters of the Spanish general, Cuesta, to make arrangements for the co-operation of the English and Spanish armies in the forthcoming campaign on the Tagus. He was afterwards present at the Battle of Talavera.

When the 71st Highlanders, then recently transformed into a light infantry corps, arrived in Portugal in the summer of 1810, Cadogan joined it at Mafra and assumed command in succession to Colonel Peacocke. At its head he distinguished himself on various occasions during the subsequent campaigns, particularly at Fuentes de Oñoro, 5 May 1811, when he succeeded to the command of a brigade consisting of the 24th, 71st, and 79th regiments, at Arroyo dos Molinos 28 Oct. 1811, and at Vittoria, 21 June 1813, where he fell. On the latter occasion the 71st was ordered to storm the heights above the village of Puebla, whereon rested the French left. While advancing to the charge at the head of his men Cadogan was mortally wounded. At his request he was moved so as to be able to witness the success of the charge before he died, aged 33. Cadogan was unmarried. Wellington, who was a friend, wrote of his merit and gallantry in his Vittoria despatch.

== Duel with Lord Paget ==
As the result of an adulterous affair between his sister Lady Charlotte (1781–1853), and Lord Paget, on 28 March 1809, Cadogan challenged the latter to a duel:

"My Lord, I hereby request you to name a time and place where I may meet you, to obtain satisfaction for the injury done myself and my whole family by your conduct to my sister. I have to add that the time must be as early as possible, and the place not in the immediate neighbourhood of London, as it is by concealment alone that I am able to evade the Police."

The contest took place on Wimbledon Common on the morning of 30 May with Hussey Vivian as Lord Paget's second and Captain McKenzie as Cadogan's. Both men discharged their pistols, honour was satisfied and the parties left the field uninjured. Lady Charlotte subsequently married Paget.

== Legacy ==
On 13 July 1813, a motion proposed by the then Foreign Secretary, Lord Castlereagh was passed in the House of Commons for a monument to be erected to Cadogan in St Paul's Cathedral. Monuments were also erected to him in Chelsea parish church and in Glasgow Cathedral.

== Notes ==
1. She was at the time married to Henry Wellesley, younger brother of the Duke of Wellington.
