= Henry Paget, 2nd Marquess of Anglesey =

British peer, Lord lieutenant and politician (1797–1869)

The Most Honourable The Marquess of Anglesey PC DL
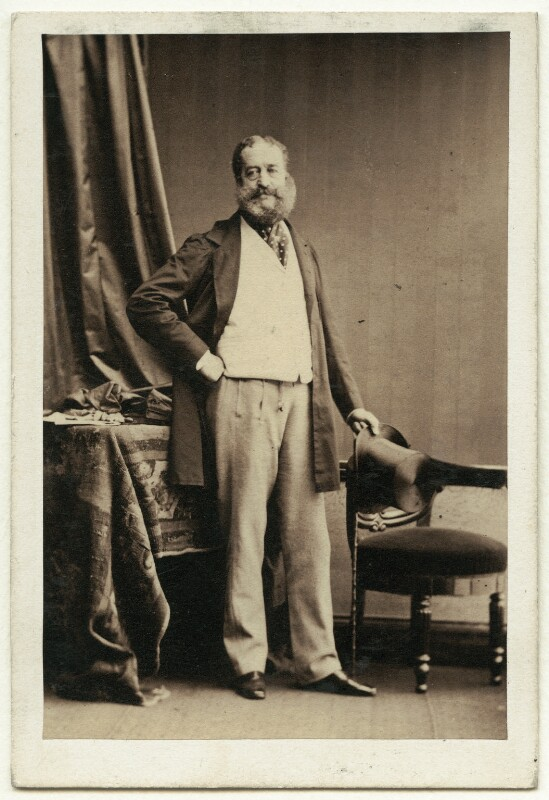

Lord Chamberlain of the Household
- In office 6 May 1839 – 30 August 1841
- Monarch: Victoria
- Prime Minister: The Viscount Melbourne
- Preceded by: The Marquess Conyngham
- Succeeded by: The Earl De La Warr

Personal details
- Born: 6 July 1797
- Died: 7 February 1869 (aged 71) Lambeth, England
- Party: Whig
- Spouse(s): Eleanora Campbell (m. 1819; died 1828) Henrietta Bagot (m. 1833; died 1844) Ellen Burnand (m. 1860)
- Children: 9 (1 stillborn)
- Parent(s): Henry Paget, 1st Marquess of Anglesey; Lady Caroline Villiers

Henry Paget, 2nd Marquess of Anglesey PC, DL (6 July 1797 – 7 February 1869), styled Lord Paget 1812 and 1815 and Earl of Uxbridge from 1815 to 1854, was a British peer and Whig politician. He served as Lord Chamberlain of the Household between 1839 and 1841.

== Background ==
Anglesey was the eldest son of Field Marshal Henry Paget, 1st Marquess of Anglesey and his first wife, Lady Caroline Elizabeth Villiers, third daughter of George Villiers, 4th Earl of Jersey. He was the half-brother of Lord Clarence Paget, Lord Alfred Paget and Lord George Paget.

He was Lieutenant-Colonel of the King's Own (2nd Staffordshire) Light Infantry Militia from 1853 to 1855.

Described as a keen sportsman, who devoted his time to shooting, coursing, racing and cricket, Anglesey helped found Worthing Cricket Club in Sussex in 1855.

== Political career ==
Anglesey entered the House of Commons for Anglesey in 1820, a seat he held until 1832. He was State Steward to the Lord Lieutenant of Ireland between 1828 and 1829. In 1832 he was summoned to the House of Lords through a writ of acceleration in his father's junior title Baron Paget. He served under Lord Melbourne as a Lord-in-waiting from 1837 to 1839 and as Lord Chamberlain of the Household from 1839 to 1841 and was sworn of the Privy Council in 1839. In 1854 he inherited the marquessate on the death of his father and also succeeded his father as Lord Lieutenant of Anglesey, an office he held until his death in 1869. He also inherited 29,700 acres which gave an astronomical annual income of £110,000 per annum.

== Family ==
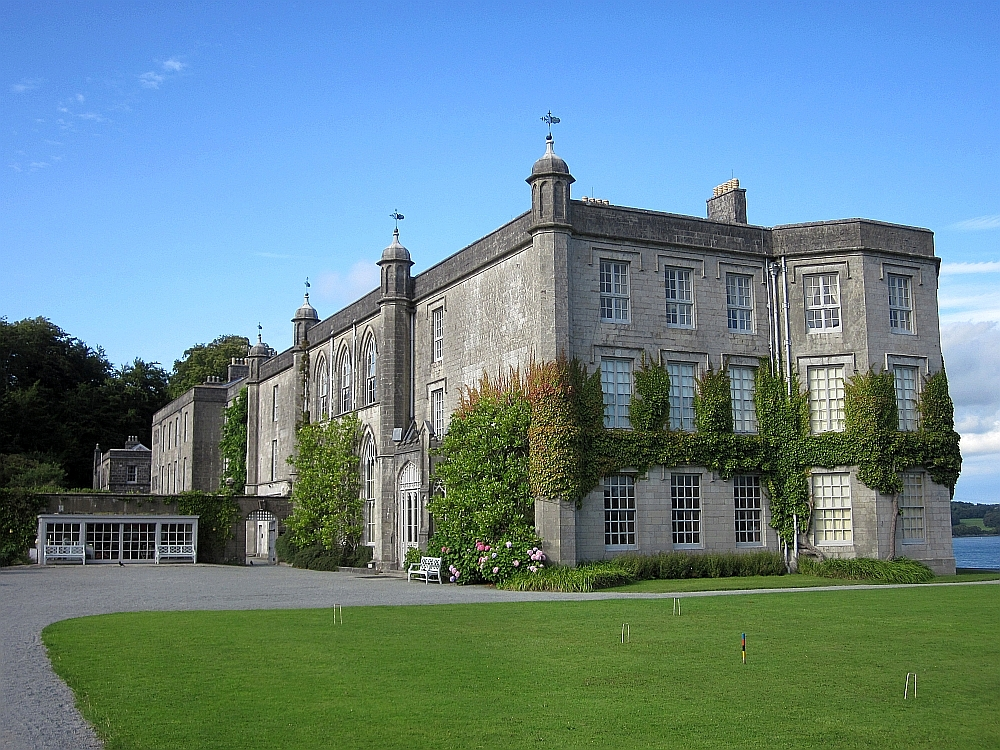
Plas Newydd, a seat of the Marquesses of Anglesey

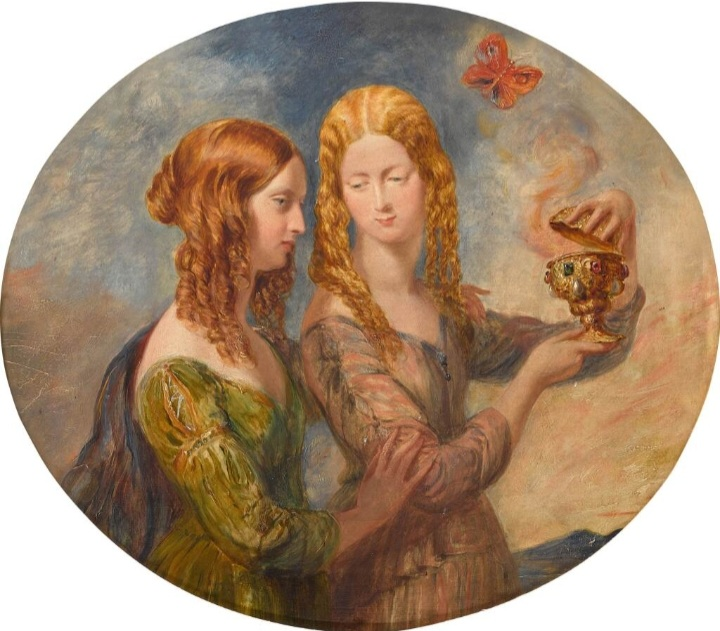
His daughters, Eleanora (1820–1847) and Constance Paget (1823–1878)

Lord Anglesey married, firstly, on 5 August 1819, Eleanora Campbell, second daughter of Colonel John Campbell and the writer Lady Charlotte Campbell, daughter of John Campbell, 5th Duke of Argyll. They had three children:

- Lady Eleanora Caroline Paget (13 May 1820 – 17 November 1848); she married Sir Sandford Graham, 3rd Bt. on 4 February 1847. Died at Eastwell Park, home of her sister Lady Winchilsea
- Henry Paget, 3rd Marquess of Anglesey (9 December 1821 – 30 January 1880); he married Sophia Eversfield on 7 June 1845.
- Lady Constance Henrietta Paget (22 January 1823 – 5 March 1878); she married George Finch-Hatton, 11th Earl of Winchilsea on 6 August 1846. They had four children.

After his first wife's death in July 1828, he married, secondly, Henrietta Bagot, fourth daughter of Charles Bagot and Lady Mary Charlotte Wellesley, on 27 August 1833. They had seven children:

- [a son] (4 May 1834 – 8 May 1834)
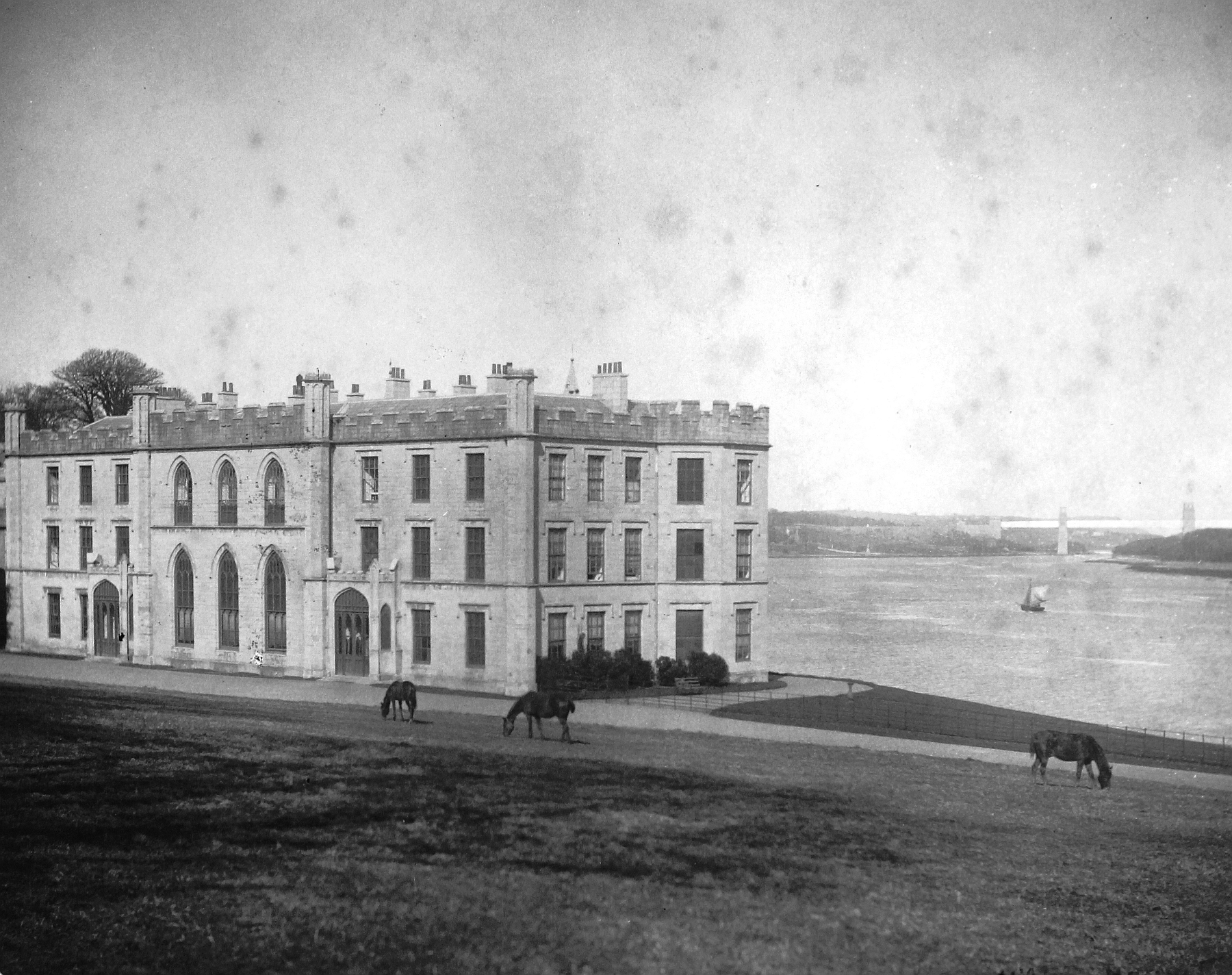
- Plas Newydd 1900
  Henry Paget, 4th Marquess of Anglesey (25 December 1835 – 13 October 1898); he married Elizabeth Norman (1841 – 5 November 1873) on 24 August 1858. He remarried Blanche Boyd (d. 14 August 1877) on 2 February 1874. They had one son. He remarried, again, Mary King on 26 June 1880.
- Alice Emily (26 October 1837 - 29 January 1839)
- Lord Alexander Victor Paget (25 April 1839 – 26 October 1896); he married Hester Stapleton-Cotton (daughter of Wellington Stapleton-Cotton, 2nd Viscount Combermere) on 26 August 1880. They had four children including their eldest son 6th Marquess of Anglesey.
- [a son] (stillborn) (12 July 1840)
- Lady Florence Cecilia Paget (August 1842 – 3 February 1907); she married Henry Rawdon-Hastings, 4th Marquess of Hastings on 16 July 1864. She remarried Sir George Chetwynd, 4th Baronet on 9 June 1870. They had three children.
- Lord Berkeley Charles Sydney Paget (5 March 1844 – 25 November 1913); he married Florence Chetwynd (maternal great-granddaughter of Charles Chetwynd-Talbot, 2nd Earl Talbot through the third son) on 5 June 1877. They had two children.
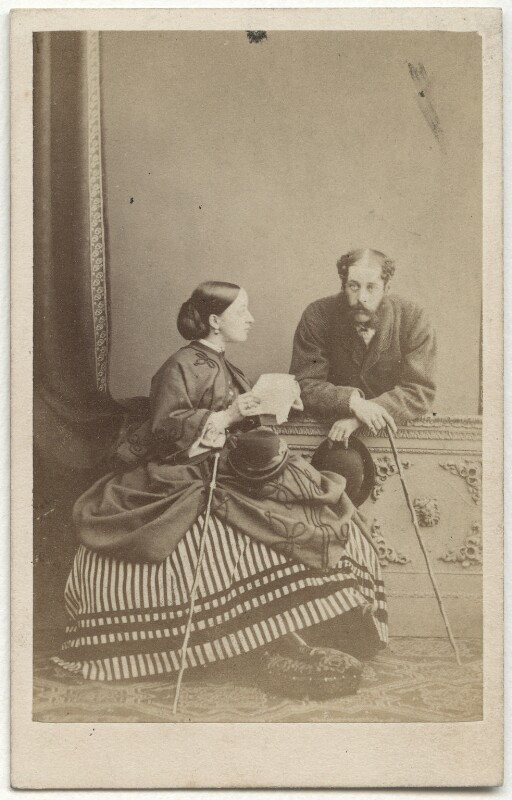
  Henry Paget, 4th Marquess of Anglesey with his sister Lady Florence, Marchioness of Hastings.

After his second wife's early death in March 1844, aged 28, Lord Anglesey married thirdly, Ellen Burnand, daughter of George Burnand and former wife of J. W. Bell, on 8 March 1860. There were no children from this marriage. He died in Lambeth, London, aged 71, and was succeeded in the marquessate by his only son from his first marriage, Henry. The Marchioness of Anglesey died Worthing, Sussex, in June 1874.

Parliament of the United Kingdom
Preceded by Berkeley Paget	Member of Parliament for Anglesey; 1820–1832	Succeeded by Sir Richard Williams-Bulkeley, Bt
Political offices
Preceded by The Marquess Conyngham	Lord Chamberlain of the Household; 1839–1841	Succeeded by The Earl De La Warr
Honorary titles
Preceded by The Marquess of Anglesey	Lord Lieutenant of Anglesey; 1854–1869	Succeeded by William Owen Stanley
Peerage of the United Kingdom
Preceded by Henry Paget	Marquess of Anglesey; 1854–1869	Succeeded by Henry Paget
Peerage of England
Preceded by Henry Paget	Baron Paget (writ of acceleration); 1832–1869	Succeeded by Henry Paget
