= Henry Paget, 1st Marquess of Anglesey =

British peer, Lord lieutenant and politician

Field Marshal The Most Honourable The Marquess of Anglesey KG GCB GCH PC
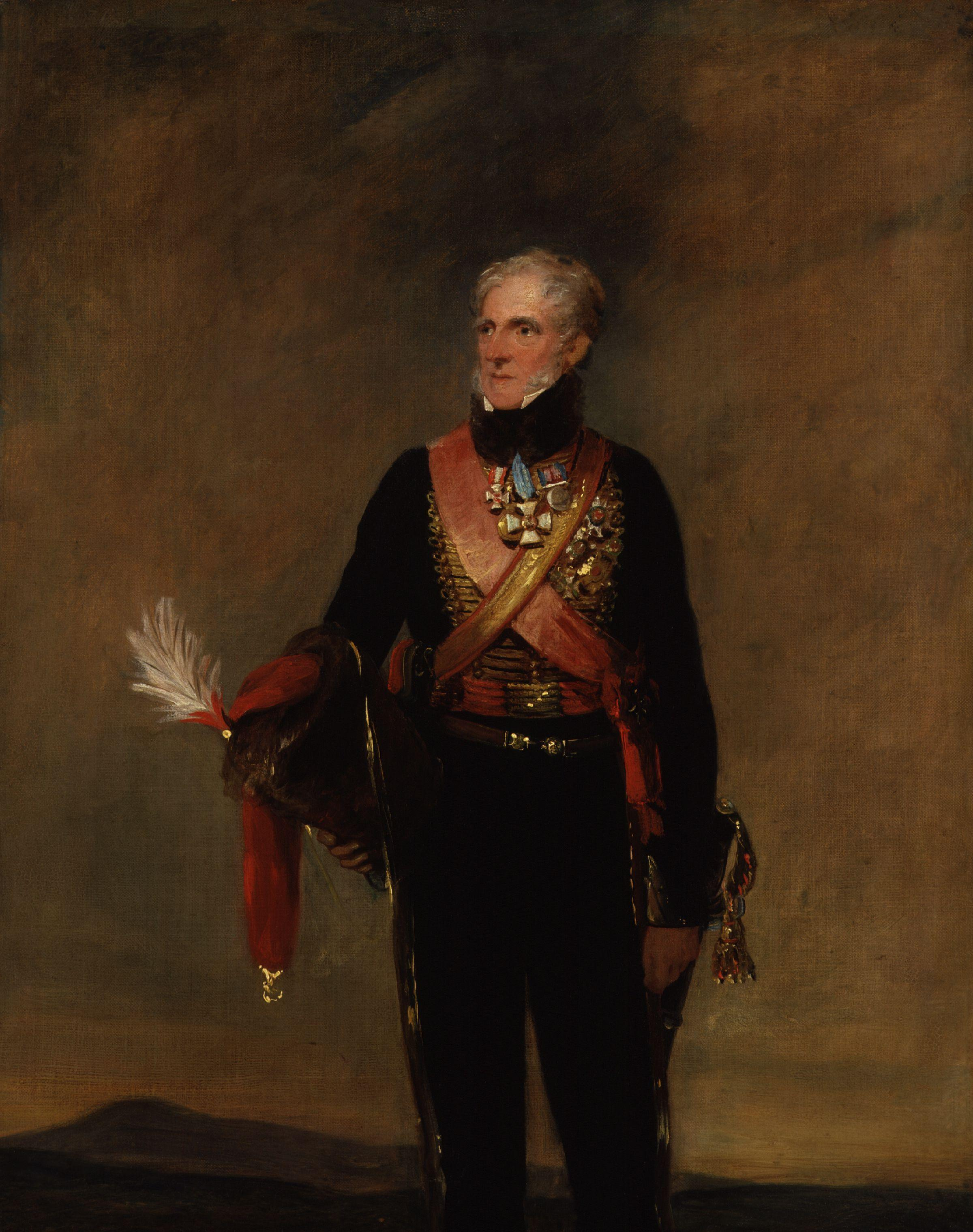
- Portrait by William Salter, c. 1830s

Lord Lieutenant of Ireland
- In office 27 February 1828 – 22 January 1829
- Monarch: George IV
- Prime Minister: The Duke of Wellington
- Preceded by: The Marquess Wellesley
- Succeeded by: The Duke of Northumberland
- In office 4 December 1830 – 12 September 1833
- Monarch: William IV
- Prime Minister: The Earl Grey
- Preceded by: The Duke of Northumberland
- Succeeded by: The Marquess Wellesley

Personal details
- Born: Henry William Bayley; 17 May 1768 London, England
- Died: 29 April 1854 (aged 85) Uxbridge House, London, England
- Resting place: Lichfield Cathedral
- Party: Whig; Tory
- Spouse(s): Lady Caroline Villiers (m. 1795; div. 1810) Lady Charlotte Cadogan (m. 1810; died 1853)
- Children: 18, including Henry, William, Clarence, Alfred, George, and Adelaide
- Parents: Henry Bayley-Paget, 1st Earl of Uxbridge; Jane Champagné
- Education: Christ Church, Oxford

Military service
- Allegiance: Great Britain; United Kingdom
- Branch/service: British Army
- Years of service: 1793–1854
- Rank: Field Marshal
- Commands: 7th Light Dragoons
- Battles/wars: French Revolutionary Wars; Flanders campaign; Anglo-Russian invasion of Holland; Napoleonic Wars; Peninsular War; Waterloo campaign
- Awards: Knight of the Order of the Garter; Knight Grand Cross of the Order of the Bath; Knight Grand Cross of the Royal Guelphic Order

Field Marshal Henry William Paget, 1st Marquess of Anglesey (17 May 1768 – 29 April 1854), styled Lord Paget between 1784 and 1812 and known as the Earl of Uxbridge between 1812 and 1815, was a British Army officer and politician. After serving as a member of parliament for Carnarvon and then for Milborne Port, he took part in the Flanders Campaign and then commanded the cavalry for Sir John Moore's army in Spain during the Peninsular War; his cavalry showed distinct superiority over their French counterparts at the Battle of Sahagún and at the Battle of Benavente, where he defeated the elite chasseurs of the French Imperial Guard. During the Hundred Days he led the charge of the heavy cavalry against Comte d'Erlon's column at the Battle of Waterloo. At the end of the battle, he lost part of one leg to a cannonball. In later life, he served twice as Master-General of the Ordnance and twice as Lord Lieutenant of Ireland.

== Background, education and politics ==
He was born Henry Bayley, the eldest son of Henry Bayley-Paget, 1st Earl of Uxbridge and his wife Jane (née Champagné), daughter of the Very Reverend Arthur Champagné, Dean of Clonmacnoise, Ireland. His father assumed the surname Paget in 1770. He was educated at Westminster School and Christ Church, Oxford.

Paget entered parliament at the 1790 general election as member for Carnarvon, a seat he held until the 1796 general election when his brother Edward was elected unopposed in his place. He then represented Milborne Port from 1796 until he resigned his seat in 1804 by appointment as Steward of the Chiltern Hundreds, and again from the 1806 election to January 1810, when he took the Chiltern Hundreds again.

== Military career ==
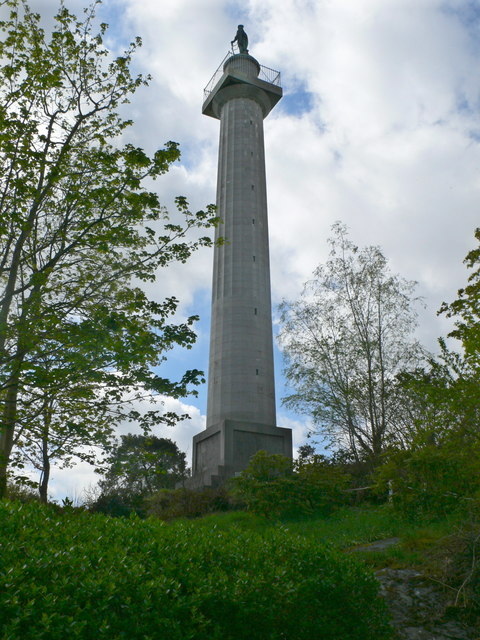
The Marquess of Anglesey's Column at Llanfairpwllgwyngyll

At the outbreak of the French Revolutionary Wars, Paget raised a regiment of Staffordshire volunteers and was given the temporary rank of lieutenant-colonel-commandant in December 1793. As the 80th Regiment of Foot, the unit took part in the Flanders Campaign of 1794 under Paget's command. He was formally commissioned into the British Army as a lieutenant in the 7th Regiment of Foot on 14 April 1795 and received rapid promotion, first to captain in the 23rd Regiment of Foot, also on 14 April 1795, then to major in the 65th Regiment of Foot, on 19 May 1795 and then to lieutenant-colonel in the 80th Regiment of Foot on 30 May 1795. He transferred to the command of the 16th Light Dragoons on 15 June 1795. Promoted to colonel on 3 May 1796, he was given command of the 7th Light Dragoons on 6 April 1797. He commanded a cavalry brigade at the Battle of Castricum in October 1799 during the Anglo-Russian invasion of Holland.

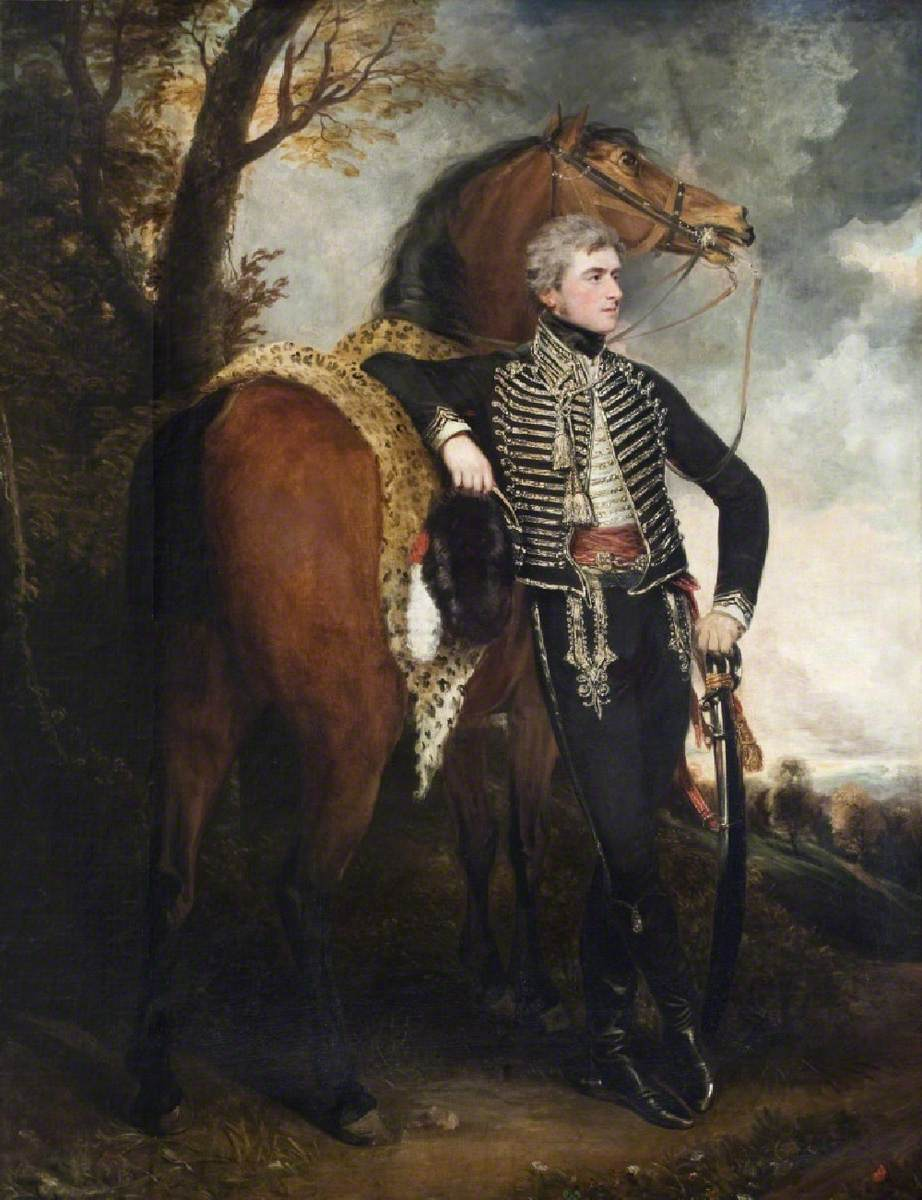
Lord Paget by John Hoppner, 1798

Paget was promoted to major-general on 29 April 1802 and lieutenant-general on 25 April 1808. He commanded the cavalry for Sir John Moore's army in Spain; his cavalry showed distinct superiority over their French counterparts at the Battle of Sahagún in December 1808, where his men captured two French lieutenant colonels and so mauled the French chasseurs that they ceased to exist as a viable regiment. He also commanded the cavalry at the Battle of Benavente later in December 1808, where he defeated the elite chasseurs of the French Imperial Guard, and then commanded the cavalry again during the Retreat to Corunna in January 1809.

This was his last service in the Peninsular War, because his liaison with Lady Charlotte, the wife of Henry Wellesley, afterwards Lord Cowley, made it impossible subsequently for him to serve with Wellington, Wellesley's brother. His only war service from 1809 to 1815 was in the disastrous Walcheren expedition in 1809, during which he commanded an infantry division.

In 1810 he was divorced and then married Lady Charlotte, who had been divorced from her husband around the same time. In March 1812 he inherited the title of Earl of Uxbridge on his father's death and was appointed a Knight Grand Cross of the Order of the Bath on 4 January 1815.

== Waterloo ==
During the Hundred Days he was appointed cavalry commander in Belgium, under the still resentful eye of Wellington. He fought at the Battle of Quatre Bras on 16 June 1815 and at the Battle of Waterloo two days later, when he led the spectacular charge of the British heavy cavalry against Comte d'Erlon's column which checked and in part routed the French Army.

One of the last cannon shots fired that day hit Paget in the right leg, necessitating its amputation. According to anecdote, he was close to Wellington when his leg was hit, and exclaimed, "By God, sir, I've lost my leg!" – to which Wellington replied, "By God, sir, so you have!" The earliest account is that given in the diary of J. W. Croker on 8 December 1818, quoting Horace Seymour who was next to Uxbridge when he was hit and helped move the wounded general from the field: "Rode with Horace Seymour. He was next to Lord Uxbridge when he was shot; he cried out: “I have got it at last.” And the Duke of Wellington only replied: “No? Have you, by God?"" According to his aide-de-camp, Thomas Wildman, during the amputation Paget smiled and said, "I have had a pretty long run. I have been a beau these 47 years and it would not be fair to cut the young men out any longer."

'Lord Uxbridge's leg' became a tourist attraction in the village of Waterloo in Belgium, to which it had been removed and where it was later interred. Paget had an articulated artificial limb fitted. The prosthetic legs he had commissioned (from one James Potts) which had movable joints became known as 'Anglesey legs' and he is credited with popularising the style. He became known as 'One-Leg'.

Paget was created Marquess of Anglesey on 4 July 1815. A 27-metre (89 ft) high monument to his heroism (designed by Thomas Harrison) was erected at Llanfairpwllgwyngyll on Anglesey, close to Paget's country retreat at Plas Newydd, in 1816. He was also appointed a Knight of the Garter on 13 March 1818 and promoted to full general on 12 August 1819.

== Social life ==
Paget was the commodore of the Royal Irish Yacht Club, based at Sackville Street, Dublin (now O'Connell Street) in 1832 at the time when he served as lord-lieutenant of Ireland.

== Later career ==
Paget's support of the proceedings against Queen Caroline, alleging her infidelity, made him unpopular for a time, and when he was on one occasion beset by a crowd, who compelled him to shout "The Queen!", he added the wish, "May all your wives be like her". At the coronation of George IV in July 1821, Paget acted as Lord High Steward of England. He was also given the additional honour of captain of Cowes Castle on 25 March 1826. In April 1827, he became a member of the Canningite Government, taking the post of Master-General of the Ordnance. Under the Wellington ministry, he accepted the appointment of Lord Lieutenant of Ireland in February 1828.

In December 1828, Paget addressed a letter to Patrick Curtis, the Roman Catholic primate of Ireland, stating his belief in the need for Catholic emancipation, which led to his recall by the government; on the formation of Earl Grey's administration in November 1830, he again became Lord-Lieutenant of Ireland. In this capacity he introduced state-aided education for 400,000 children. In July 1833, the ministry resigned over the Irish question. Still an impressive horseman even with a cork leg, George Whyte-Melville recalled the crowds that formed to cheer Paget as his well-ridden hack wended the London route from Piccadilly into Albemarle Street. Paget spent the following thirteen years out of office, then joined Lord John Russell's administration as Master-General of the Ordnance in July 1846. He was promoted to field-marshal on 9 November 1846 and, having been appointed Lord Lieutenant of Staffordshire on 31 January 1849, he finally retired from the Government in March 1852.

Paget also served as honorary colonel of the 7th Light Dragoons and later of the Royal Horse Guards. He died of a stroke at Uxbridge House in Burlington Gardens on 29 April 1854 and was buried at Lichfield Cathedral, where a monument is erected to his honour. He was succeeded by his eldest son from his first marriage, Henry.

== Marriages and issue ==
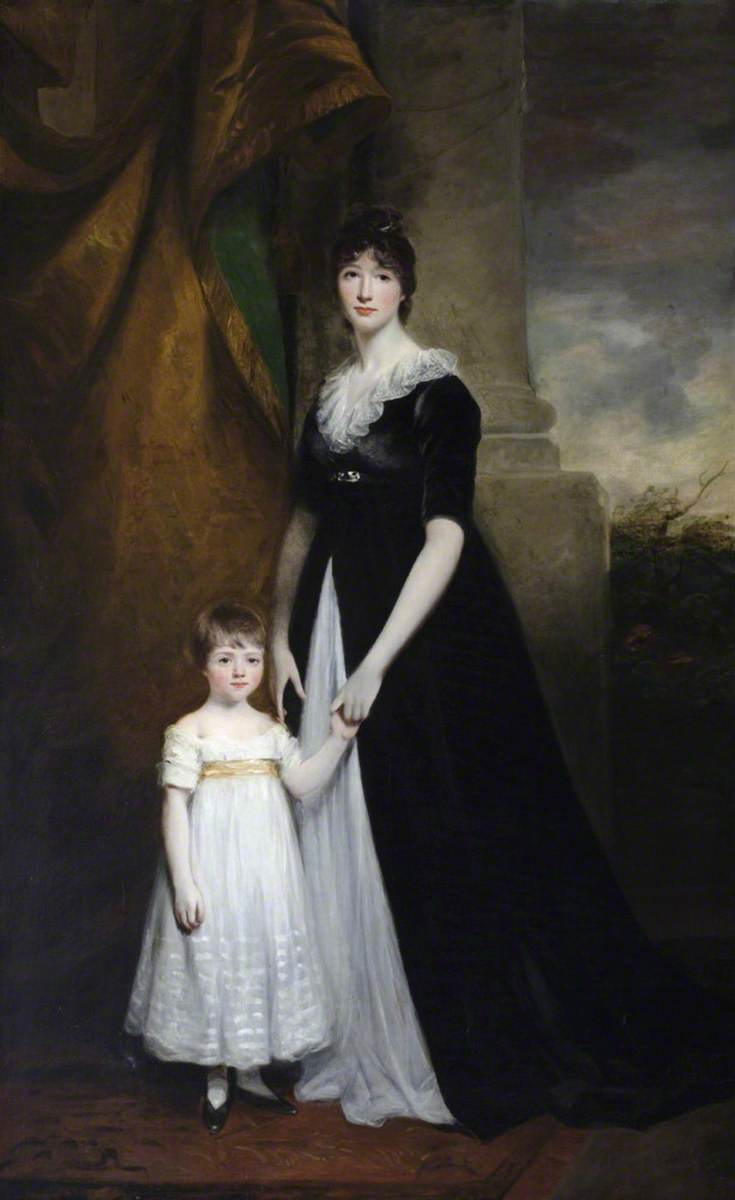
Lady Caroline Villiers, (Lady Paget and later Duchess of Argyll), with her eldest son, Henry, by John Hoppner, 1800

Paget was first married on 5 July 1795 in London to Lady Caroline Elizabeth Villiers (16 December 1774 – 16 June 1835), daughter of George Bussy Villiers, 4th Earl of Jersey and Frances Villiers, Countess of Jersey. They had eight children:

- Lady Caroline Paget (6 June 1796 – 12 March 1874); married Charles Gordon-Lennox, 5th Duke of Richmond; they are ancestors of Diana, Princess of Wales.
- Henry Paget, 2nd Marquess of Anglesey (6 July 1797 – 7 February 1869); married Eleanora Campbell, granddaughter of John Campbell, 5th Duke of Argyll
- Lady Jane Paget (13 October 1798 – 28 January 1876); married Francis Conyngham, 2nd Marquess Conyngham.
- Lady Georgina Paget (29 August 1800 – 9 November 1875); married Edward Crofton, 2nd Baron Crofton.
- Lady Augusta Paget (26 January 1802 – 6 June 1872); married Arthur Chichester, 1st Baron Templemore.
- Captain Lord William Paget RN (1 March 1803 – 17 May 1873); married Frances de Rottenburg, daughter of Francis de Rottenburg
- Lady Agnes Paget (11 February 1804 – 9 October 1845); married George Byng, 2nd Earl of Strafford; they were parents to George Byng, 3rd Earl of Strafford, Henry Byng, 4th Earl of Strafford and Francis Byng, 5th Earl of Strafford
- Lord Arthur Paget (31 January 1805 – 28 December 1825)

While Lady Paget recovered from the birth of their last child, Lord Paget

"paid her the kindest affectionate attentions yet from that period his love and affection for her as a wife seem to have been entirely estranged. While his Lordship lived in the same house sat at the same table and frequented the same Company with his wife he treated her person with the coldest indifference and neglect withholding all Connubial intercourse with her and constantly sleeping in a different room from her."

Paget had in fact begun an affair with Lady Charlotte Wellesley (1781–1853), the wife of Henry Wellesley (brother of the Duke of Wellington) and daughter of Charles Cadogan, 1st Earl Cadogan and Mary Churchill.

In November 1808, Paget went to Spain to fight in the Peninsular War, but on his return he and Lady Charlotte resumed their affair, and in March 1809 they scandalously eloped and began living together. On 28 March 1809, Lady Charlotte's brother, Henry Cadogan, challenged Paget to a duel:

"My Lord, I hereby request you to name a time and place where I may meet you, to obtain satisfaction for the injury done myself and my whole family by your conduct to my sister. I have to add that the time must be as early as possible, and the place not in the immediate neighbourhood of London, as it is by concealment alone that I am able to evade the Police."

The contest took place on Wimbledon Common on the morning of 30 May with Hussey Vivian as Lord Paget's second and Captain McKenzie as Cadogan's. Both men discharged their pistols, honour was satisfied and the parties left the field uninjured. Henry Wellesley had his marriage dissolved by a private act of Parliament, Wellesley's Divorce Act 1810 (50 Geo. 3. c. 1 Pr.), and sued Lord Paget for damages, being awarded £24,000 for criminal conversion.

By this time, Caroline, Lady Paget, had fallen in love with the Duke of Argyll, and was equally eager to divorce Lord Paget. However, she was unable to obtain a divorce in England, as only husbands could seek a bill of divorce on the grounds of adultery alone; for wives, the adultery was required to be compounded by "life-threatening cruelty."

The Pagets took advantage of Scots law to get an expedited divorce. Lord Paget and Lady Charlotte stayed together at hotels in Edinburgh and Perthshire, where they were witnessed in bed together by chambermaids. However, if Lady Charlotte had been identified by name she would not have been able to marry Lord Paget under Scottish law, and she "positively refus'd letting Lord Paget domiciliate with any other woman", so the couple concealed her identity so the witnesses could attest they had no idea of the identity of the woman whom they saw with Lord Paget. It was said she "eat, drank, and slept in a black veil".

The divorce was granted in Scotland, and Lord Paget and (the already pregnant) Lady Charlotte married in Edinburgh on 15 November 1810. They had 10 children, of whom six survived infancy:

- Lady Emily Paget (4 March 1810 – 6 March 1893); married John Townshend, 1st Earl Sydney.
- Lord Clarence Paget (17 June 1811 – 22 March 1895); married Martha Stuart, the youngest daughter of Admiral Sir Robert Otway.
- Lady Mary Paget (16 June 1812 – 20 February 1859); married John Montagu, 7th Earl of Sandwich. They were parents of Edward Montagu, 8th Earl of Sandwich.
- The Hon. Alfred Paget (4 May 1815 – buried 13 May 1815), died in infancy
- Lord Alfred Paget (29 June 1816 – 24 August 1888); married Cecilia, second daughter and co-heiress of George Thomas Wyndham, of Cromer Hall, Norfolk in 1847.
- Lord George Paget (16 March 1818 – 30 June 1880); a brigadier general of the British Army.
- Lady Adelaide Paget (2 January 1820 – 21 August 1890); married Frederick William Cadogan, a son of George Cadogan, 3rd Earl Cadogan and his wife Honoria Louisa Blake. She was a train-bearer at Queen Victoria's coronation in 1838. She wrote the first book of patience games in the English language as well as other books and plays.
- Lord Albert Augustus William Paget (27 December 1821 – buried April 1822 in St James's Church, Piccadilly; reburied 23 June 1823 in Lichfield Cathedral), died in infancy
- Lord Albert Arthur Paget (24 May 1823 – buried 23 June 1823), buried in Lichfield Cathedral with elder brother Lord Albert
- Lady Alice Paget (21 May 1825 – buried 10 June 1825)

== Namesakes ==
Anglesea Street, Cork and Anglesea Street in Clonmel were both named for the Marquess of Anglesey. Renaming the street in Cork for Terence MacSwiney is currently being discussed.

== Gallery ==
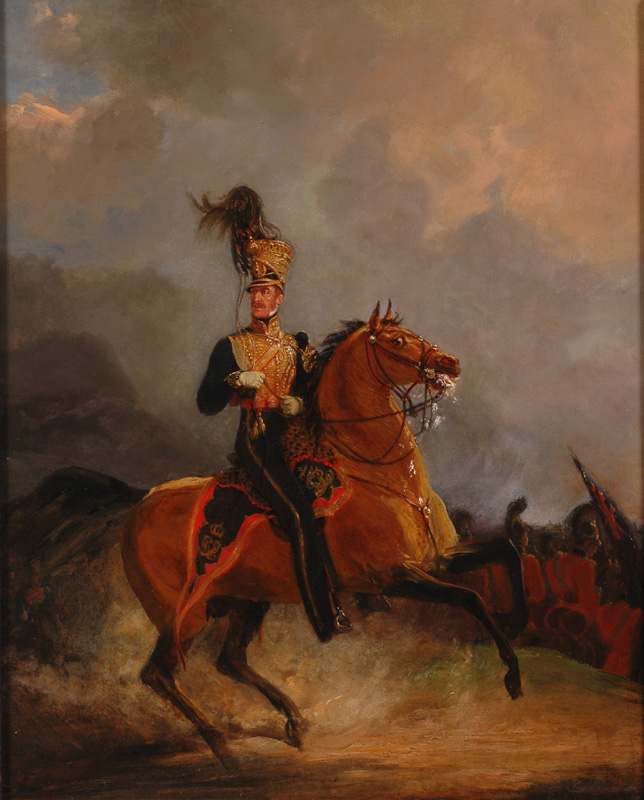
The Marquess of Anglesey at Waterloo, by Jan Willem Pieneman

"Imaginary Meeting of Sir Arthur Wellesley, Duke of Wellington and Sir Henry William Paget" by Constantinus Fidelio Coene, c. 1820

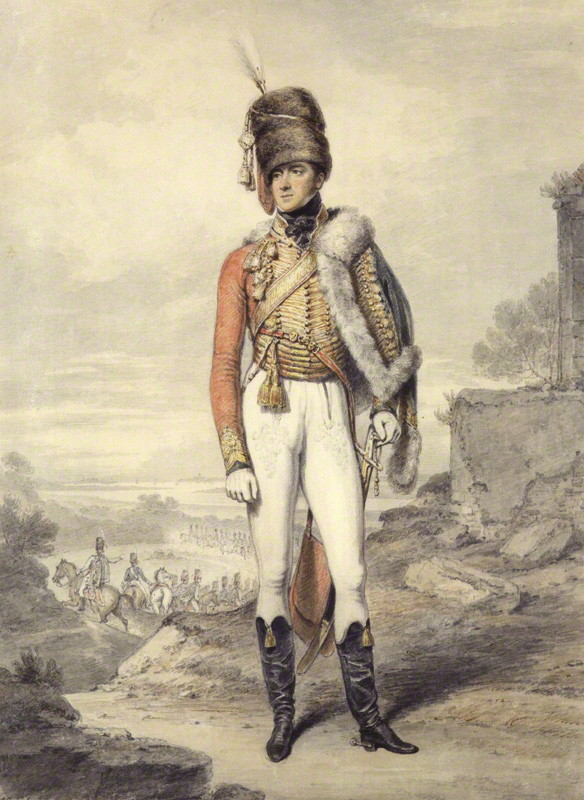
The Marquess of Anglesey by Henry Edridge

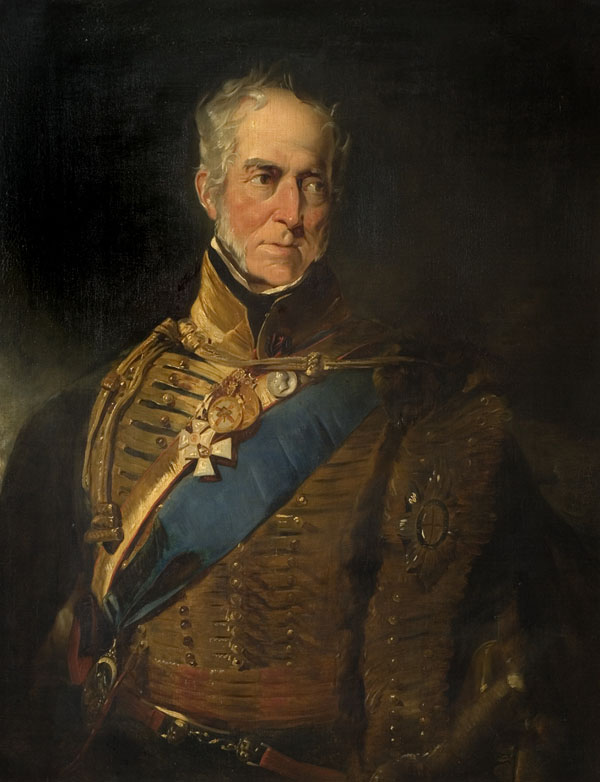
The Marquess of Anglesey, 1840

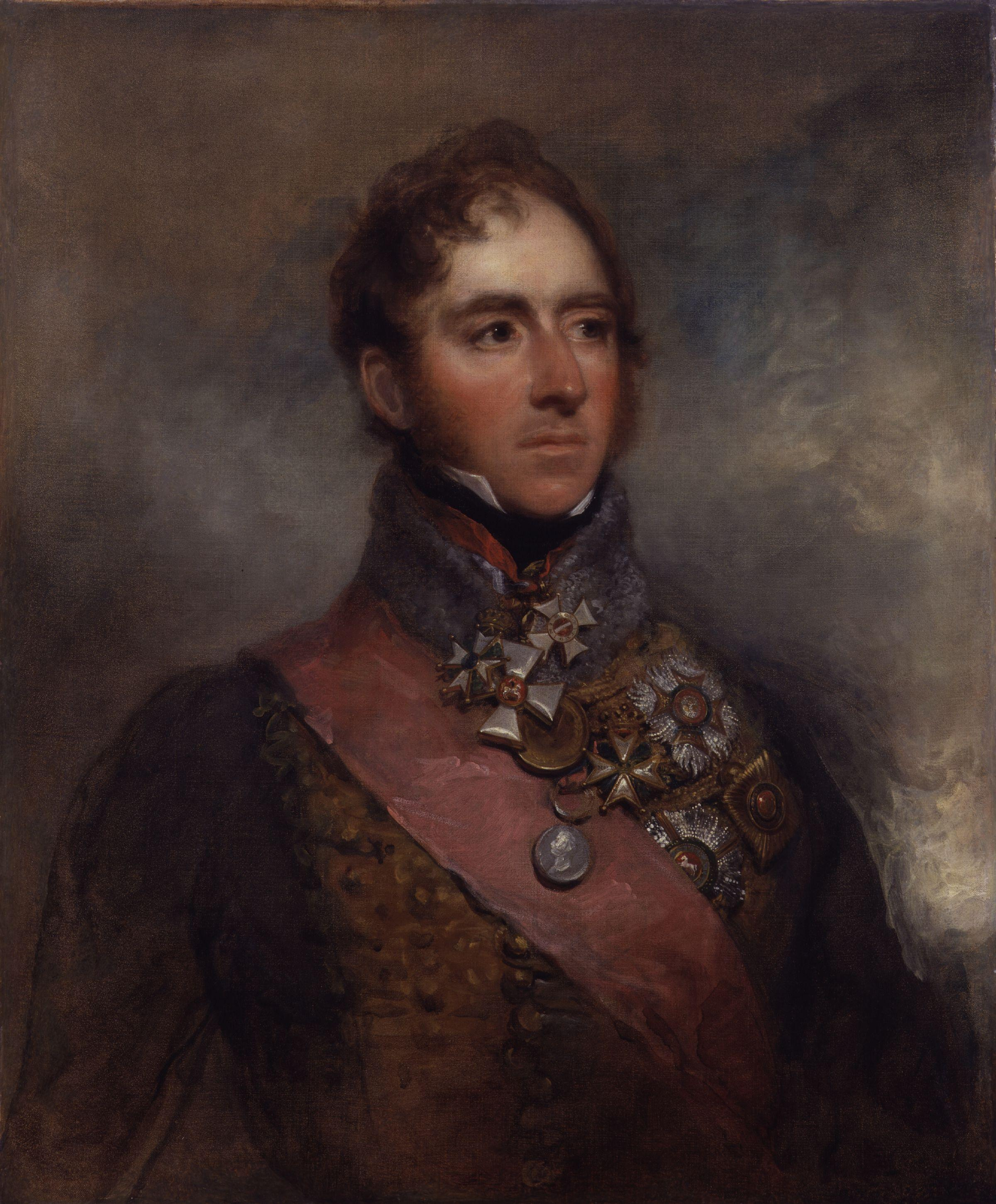
The Marquess of Anglesey by George Dawe

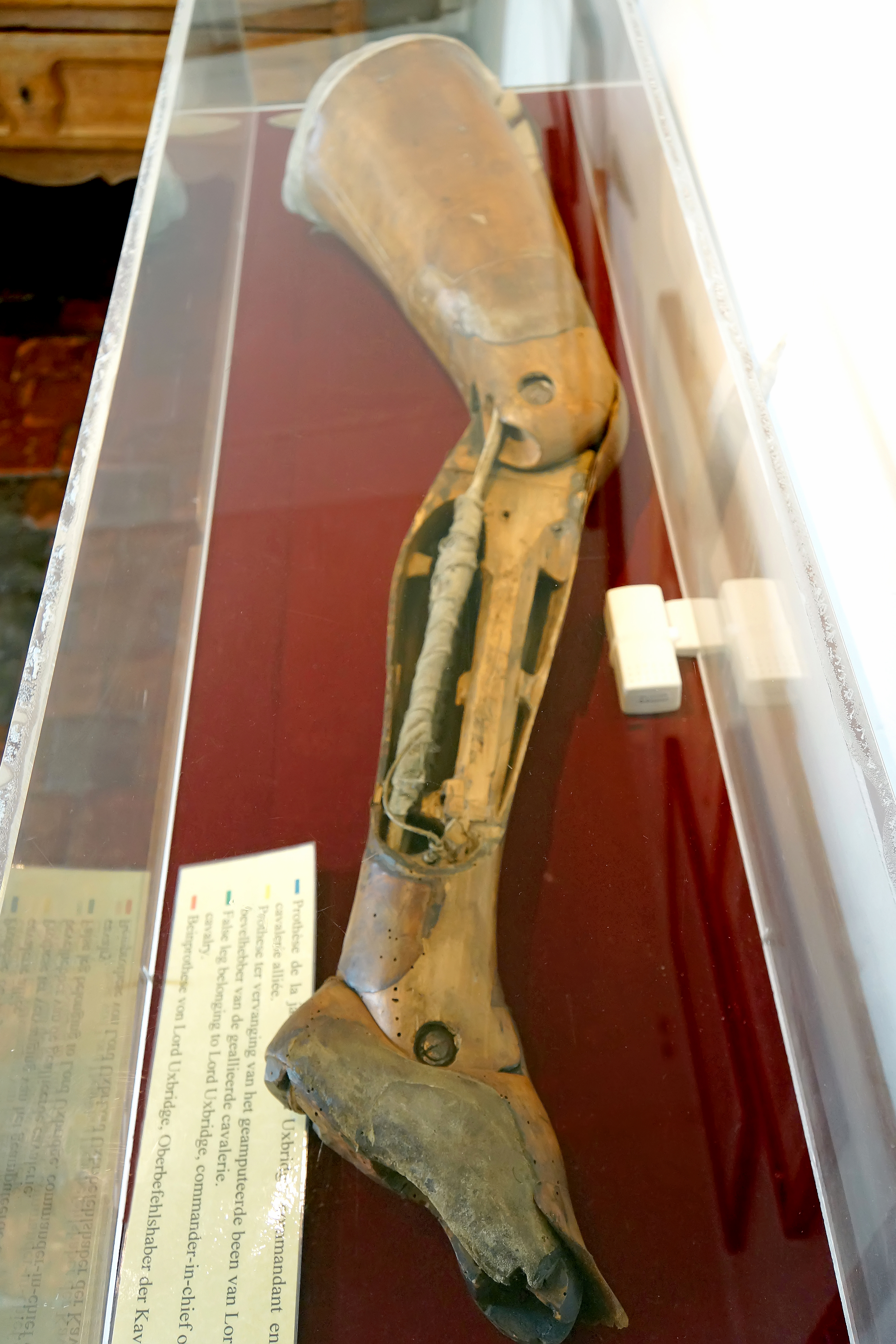
False leg at the Wellington Museum, Waterloo

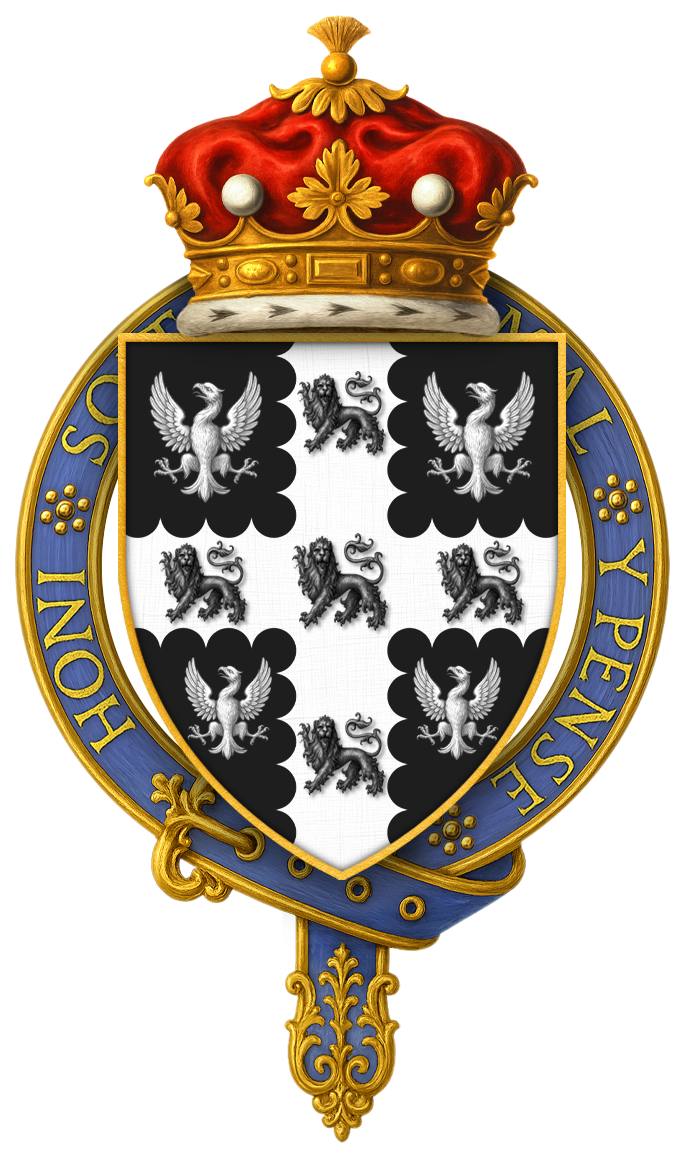
Shield of arms

== Sources ==
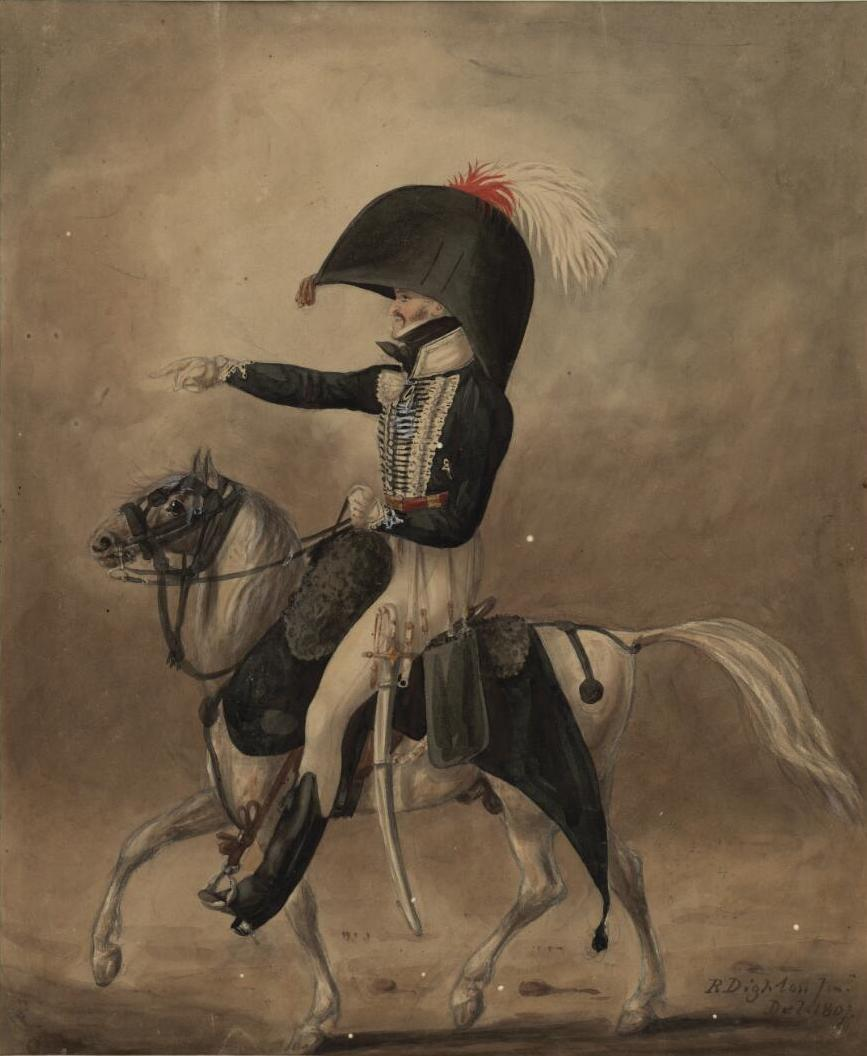
Caricature of Henry William Paget

- Barbero, Alessandro (2005). The Battle: A New History of Waterloo. Atlantic Books. ISBN 1-84354-310-9.
- Fletcher, Ian (1999). Galloping at Everything. Staplehurst. ISBN 1-86227-016-3.
- Heathcote, Tony (1999). The British Field Marshals, 1736–1997: A Biographical Dictionary. Barnsley: Leo Cooper. ISBN 0-85052-696-5.
- Paget, Edward Clarence (1913). Memoir of The Hon Sir Charles Paget, GCH (Brother of the "Waterloo" Marquess of Anglesey). Longmans, Green & Co.
- Stooks Smith, Henry (1973) [1844–1850]. Craig, F. W. S. (ed.). The Parliaments of England (2nd ed.). Chichester: Parliamentary Research Services. ISBN 0-900178-13-2.

Attribution:

Parliament of Great Britain
Preceded by Glyn Wynn	Member of Parliament for Carnarvon; 1790–1796	Succeeded by Edward Paget
Preceded by The Lord Muncaster; Mark Wood	Member of Parliament for Milborne Port; 1796–1800; With: Robert Ainslie	Succeeded by Parliament of the United Kingdom
Parliament of the United Kingdom
Preceded by Parliament of Great Britain	Member of Parliament for Milborne Port; 1801–1804; With: Robert Ainslie 1801–1804; Hugh Leycester 1802–1804	Succeeded by Hugh Leycester; Charles Paget
Preceded by Hugh Leycester; Charles Paget	Member of Parliament for Milborne Port; 1806–1810; With: Hugh Leycester	Succeeded by Hugh Leycester; Viscount Lewisham
Military offices
Preceded by David Dundas	Colonel of the 7th (or Queen's Own) Regiment of (Light) Dragoons; 1801–1842	Succeeded by Sir James Keanrey
Preceded by The Viscount Hill	Colonel of the Royal Regiment of Horse Guards (The Blues); 1842–1854	Succeeded by The Lord Raglan
Political offices
Preceded by The Duke of Wellington	Master-General of the Ordnance; 1827–1828	Succeeded by The Viscount Beresford
Preceded by The Marquess Wellesley	Lord Lieutenant of Ireland; 1828–1829	Succeeded by The Duke of Northumberland
Preceded by The Duke of Northumberland	Lord Lieutenant of Ireland; 1830–1833	Succeeded by The Marquess Wellesley
Preceded by Sir George Murray	Master-General of the Ordnance; 1846–1852	Succeeded by The Viscount Hardinge
Honorary titles
Preceded by The Earl of Uxbridge	Lord Lieutenant of Anglesey; 1812–1854	Succeeded by The Marquess of Anglesey
Preceded by The Earl of Uxbridge	Vice-Admiral of North Wales and Carmarthenshire; 1812–1854	Succeeded by The Lord Mostyn
Preceded by The Earl Talbot	Lord Lieutenant of Staffordshire; 1849–1854	Succeeded by The Lord Hatherton
Court offices
Vacant Title last held by The Lord Erskine	Lord High Steward; 1821	Vacant Title next held by The Duke of Hamilton
Peerage of the United Kingdom
New creation	Marquess of Anglesey; 1815–1854	Succeeded by Henry Paget
Peerage of Great Britain
Preceded by Henry Paget	Earl of Uxbridge; 2nd creation 1812–1854	Succeeded by Henry Paget
Peerage of England
Preceded by Henry Paget	Baron Paget (descended by acceleration); 1812–1832	Succeeded by Henry Paget
