= Arthur Champagne =

Irish Anglican priest

Arthur Champagne (18 August 1713 – 7 May 1799) was an Anglican priest in Ireland during the 18th century.

Champagne was born in Queen's County (now County Laois) and educated at Trinity College, Dublin. He was appointed a prebendary of Kildare Cathedral in 1741 and Vicar of Mullingar a year later. He was Dean of Clonmacnoise from 1761 until his death.

Through his daughter Jane Paget (née Champagné), and her son Henry Paget, he is an ancestor of Diana, Princess of Wales, and her sons, William, Prince of Wales and Harry, Duke of Sussex.
