= William Henry George Wellesley =

British naval officer

Captain William Henry George Wellesley
- Born: 2 February 1806; Cheshunt, Hertfordshire, England
- Died: 21 December 1875 (aged 69); Islington, Middlesex, England
- Occupation: Naval officer

William Henry George Wellesley (1806–1875) was an officer in the Royal Navy, and a member of the influential Wellesley family. His uncle Richard inherited the title Earl of Mornington in the Irish House of Lords, and then Richard, his uncles William and Arthur were made members of the UK House of Lords. His father was made Baron Cowley, in 1828. His eldest brother Henry was made an Earl, in 1847.

He was given command of HMS Sapphire from 1830 to 1832, and assumed command of HMS Winchester from 1832 to 1833. During this time surveys he conducted contributed to the navigation around the South Atlantic coasts of Africa and South America, and the waters around Australia.

His uncle Gerald and younger brother, also named Gerald were senior Anglicans, Chaplain of the Royal Household and Dean of Windsor, respectively. Wellesley however converted, joining the Plymouth Brethren, an evangelical sect, in the 1840s. The sect were pacifists, and Wellesley resigned his commission and left the Navy, when he converted.
