= Gerald Wellesley =

Dean of Windsor (1809–1882)

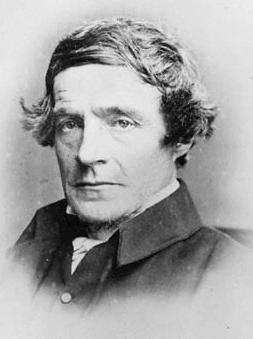
Gerald Valerian Wellesley, by John & Charles Watkins

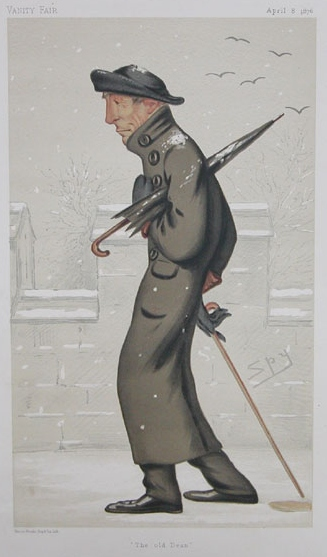
"The old Dean", Wellesley as caricatured by Spy (Leslie Ward) in Vanity Fair, April 1876

Hon. and Very Rev. Gerald Valerian Wellesley (1809 – 17 September 1882) was a Church of England cleric who became the Dean of Windsor. A nephew of the Duke of Wellington, he was domestic chaplain to Queen Victoria and played a major advisory role regarding the royal family's personal affairs. He was one of the Queen's chief confidants and often served as an intermediary in her problems and conflicts.

In Church appointments he was sensitive to the Queen's preferences: he avoided recommending the appointment of either High Churchmen or teetotallers. He tried to identify and place clergymen who were also high status gentlemen in key parish churches. He was politically nonpartisan, but was a friend of William Gladstone. He played a prominent advisory role in the ministerial crisis of 1880.

== Family ==
Wellesley was born in Chelsea, London, the third son of Henry Wellesley, 1st Baron Cowley (1773–1847), and his first wife, Lady Charlotte Cadogan (1781–1853), daughter of Charles Cadogan, 1st Earl Cadogan. His father was the younger brother of the 1st Duke of Wellington. His parents divorced in 1810 after his mother's affair with Lord Paget.

On 16 September 1856, at St Mary's, Bryanston Square, London, he married the Hon. Magdalen "Lily" Montagu (1831–1919), daughter of Henry Montagu, 6th Baron Rokeby, and his wife, Magdalen Huxley. They had one child, who died at aged 17.

- Albert Victor Arthur Wellesley (4 July 1865 – 23 April 1883), godson and page of honour to Queen Victoria

== Life ==
Educated at Eton College and Trinity College, Cambridge (graduating MA in 1830), he was ordained in 1831. His first living was a family one at Stratfield Saye (1836–1854), during which he became Queen Victoria's resident chaplain (in 1849), leading to his appointment as Dean in 1854. He was Lord High Almoner from 1870 to 1882.

Tactful and gentlemanly in demeanour, religiously analogous to the queen, and a preacher of short sermons, he became "one of Victoria's most valued advisers", doing "everything on all sad and happy occasions to make me comfortable" and acting as an intermediary between her and Gladstone on both ecclesiastical and secular matters. Her appreciation of him was summed up in what she required in his successor as dean:

a tolerant, liberal minded broad church clergyman who at the same time is pleasant socially and is popular with all Members and classes of her Household,—who understands her feelings not only in ecclesiastical but also in social matters—a good kind man without pride.

Gladstone frequently sought his advice on patronage questions, noting in his diary at the time of Wellesley's death:

'I reckoned his life the most valuable in the Church of England'.

Wellesley died in Hazelwood, near Watford, and was buried in St George's Chapel, Windsor; his widow was appointed "Extra Woman of the Bedchamber" in November 1882.

== Memorials ==
His memorial at Stratfield Saye was sculpted by George Gammon Adams.
