= Lady Adelaide Cadogan =

British author

- Born: Adelaide Paget; 1820
- Died: 1890 (aged 69–70)
- Occupation: Writer
- Notable work: Works on plays and card games
- Spouse: Frederick William Cadogan (m. 1851)
- Parent(s): Henry Paget, 1st Marquess of Anglesey; Lady Charlotte Cadogan

Lady Adelaide Cadogan (née Paget; 1820–1890) was a British noblewoman and prodigious author, most noted for her seminal work on plays and card games. She used her title in her publications and that is how she is generally styled.

== Biography ==
Lady Adelaide Paget was born in 1820. She was the daughter of Henry Paget, 1st Marquess of Anglesey and Lady Charlotte Paget, née Cadogan. She was one of the train-bearers to Queen Victoria at her 1838 coronation.

She married her first cousin, the Honourable Frederick William Cadogan. Their grandparents were Charles Cadogan, 1st Earl Cadogan and his second wife, Mary Churchill.

Lady Adelaide's Illustrated Games of Patience is believed to be the first-ever compendium on patience games. Originally published around 1870, it ran through many editions and is still reprinted today. In England, a "Cadogan" has come to be used as a term for any book on patience games.

== Selected works ==
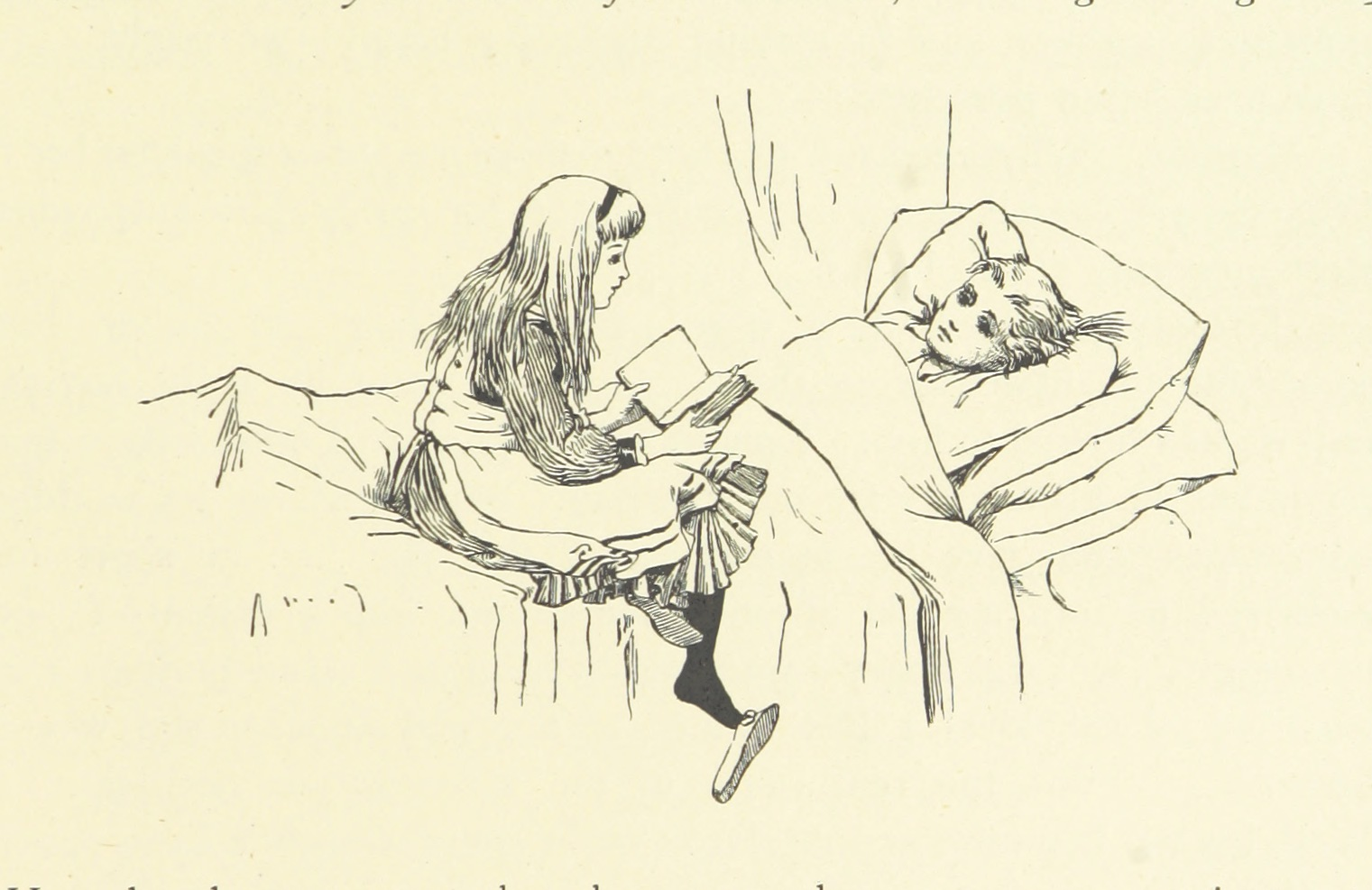
Illustration from Drawing-Room Plays by Lady Adelaide Cadogan.

- Illustrated Games of Patience. (1874)
- Drawing-Room Plays, Selected and Adapted from the French
- Lady Cadogan's Illustrated Games of Patience or Solitaire (1914).

== Bibliography ==
- Morehead, Albert H. (2013). The Complete Book of Solitaire and Patience Games. London: Read.
