= Henry Wellesley, 1st Baron Cowley =

Anglo-Irish diplomat and politician (1773-1847)

The Right Honourable The Lord Cowley GCB PC
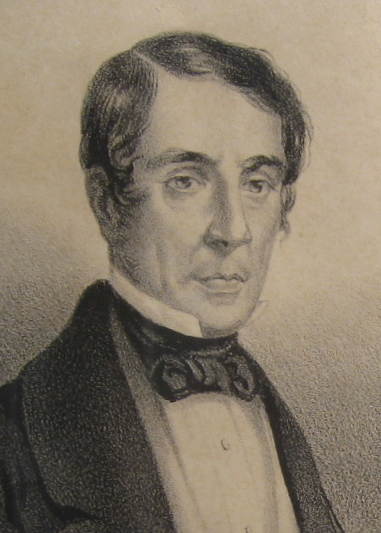

1st Baron Cowley
- Born: 20 January 1773
- Died: 27 April 1847 (aged 74)
- Spouses: Lady Charlotte Cadogan; Lady Georgiana Cecil
- Issue: Henry Wellesley, 1st Earl Cowley; Captain Hon. William Henry George Wellesley; Gerald Wellesley
- Father: Garret Wesley, 1st Earl of Mornington
- Mother: Anne Hill-Trevor

Henry Wellesley, 1st Baron Cowley GCB (20 January 1773 – 27 April 1847) was an Anglo-Irish diplomat and politician. He was the younger brother of the soldier and politician Arthur Wellesley, 1st Duke of Wellington. He is known particularly for his service as British Ambassador to Spain during the Peninsular War where he acted in cooperation with his brother to gain the support of Cortes of Cádiz. His later postings included being Ambassador in Vienna where he dealt with Metternich and British Ambassador to France during the reign of Louis Philippe I.

His career was closely connected with that of his elder brothers Arthur and Richard Wellesley, who served as Foreign Secretary between 1809 and 1812. He became embroiled in a public scandal in 1809 when his wife Charlotte eloped with Henry Paget who as Lord Uxbridge was later to serve as cavalry commander under his brother at the Battle of Waterloo.

== Background and education ==
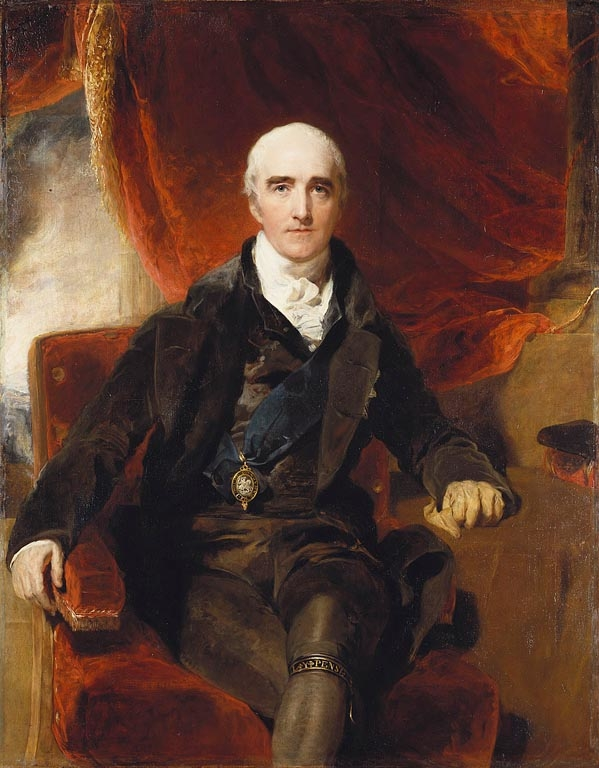
Portrait of the Marquess Wellesley by Thomas Lawrence. Henry's elder brother Richard Wellesley promoted his diplomatic career in both India and Europe.

Wellesley was the fifth and youngest son of Garret Wesley, 1st Earl of Mornington, by Anne Hill-Trevor, eldest daughter of Arthur Hill-Trevor, 1st Viscount Dungannon, both families of Anglo-Irish descent. He was the younger brother of Arthur Wellesley, 1st Duke of Wellington, Richard Wellesley, 1st Marquess Wellesley, and William Wellesley-Pole, 3rd Earl of Mornington. He was educated at Eton and at the court of the Duke of Brunswick. He purchased an ensigncy in the 40th Foot in 1790.

== Diplomatic career ==
Wellesley's diplomatic career began in 1791 when he was appointed attaché to the British embassy at The Hague. The next year, he became Secretary of Legation in Stockholm. In 1791, he exchanged into the 1st Foot Guards and in 1793, he purchased a Lieutenancy. In 1794, while on a trip home from Lisbon with his sister Anne, he was captured by the French, and remained in prison during the height of the terror, escaping only in 1795. Later that year, he sat for the Trim constituency in the Irish House of Commons.

At the 1807 general election he was elected to the House of Commons of the United Kingdom as a Member of Parliament both for the Athlone constituency in Ireland, and for Eye constituency in England. He chose to sit for Eye, and held the seat until his resignation in 1809 by taking the Chiltern Hundreds.

In 1797, Wellesley accompanied Lord Malmesbury as secretary on his unsuccessful mission to negotiate peace with the French at Lille. Later that year, he travelled to India, where he became private secretary to his oldest brother, Lord Mornington, the new governor-general. He was in India between 1797 and 1799, and again from 1801 to 1802, and was a useful assistant to his brother in a variety of diplomatic capacities, negotiating treaties with Mysore and Oudh.

In 1802 he returned to Europe, and the next year married Lady Charlotte Cadogan, by whom he had three sons and a daughter before she abandoned him in 1809, running off with Lord Paget, a talented cavalry officer. They divorced in 1810. Although, at first, Paget's career was badly affected by the affair, as he was later unable to serve under Wellesley's brother Wellington in the Peninsular War due to the bad blood, Paget later distinguished himself under Wellington at Waterloo.

In 1809, Wellesley became the British envoy to Spain – his eldest brother, by now Marquess Wellesley, was now Foreign Secretary, while his brother Arthur (now Viscount Wellington) was the commander of the Anglo-Portuguese forces in the Iberian Peninsula. Together, the three brothers helped to make the Peninsular campaign a success, and in 1812 Wellesley was knighted. He remained Ambassador to Spain until 1821, but found time to marry again, this time to Lady Georgiana Cecil, daughter of the Marquess of Salisbury.

In 1823, Wellesley became Ambassador to Austria, where he remained until 1831. Although he was close acquaintances with Foreign Secretary George Canning, who had asked Wellesley to serve as his second in his duel with Lord Castlereagh, Wellesley felt that Canning did not appreciate his services, feeling him to be too conciliatory.

In January 1828, Wellesley was created Baron Cowley, of Wellesley in the County of Somerset, due to his brother Wellington's influence with the prime minister, Lord Goderich. His final diplomatic service was in Paris, where he served as British ambassador to France during Robert Peel's administrations in 1835 and 1841–46. In 1846, Cowley retired, but remained in Paris, where he died the next year.

== Family ==
Wellesley's Divorce Act 1810
- Act of Parliament
- Parliament of the United Kingdom
- Long title: An Act to dissolve the Marriage of the Right Honourable Henry Wellesley with the Right Honourable Charlotte Wellesley, his now Wife and to enable him marry again; and for other Purposes therein mentioned.
- Citation: 50 Geo. 3. c. 1 Pr.

Dates
- Royal assent: 22 February 1810

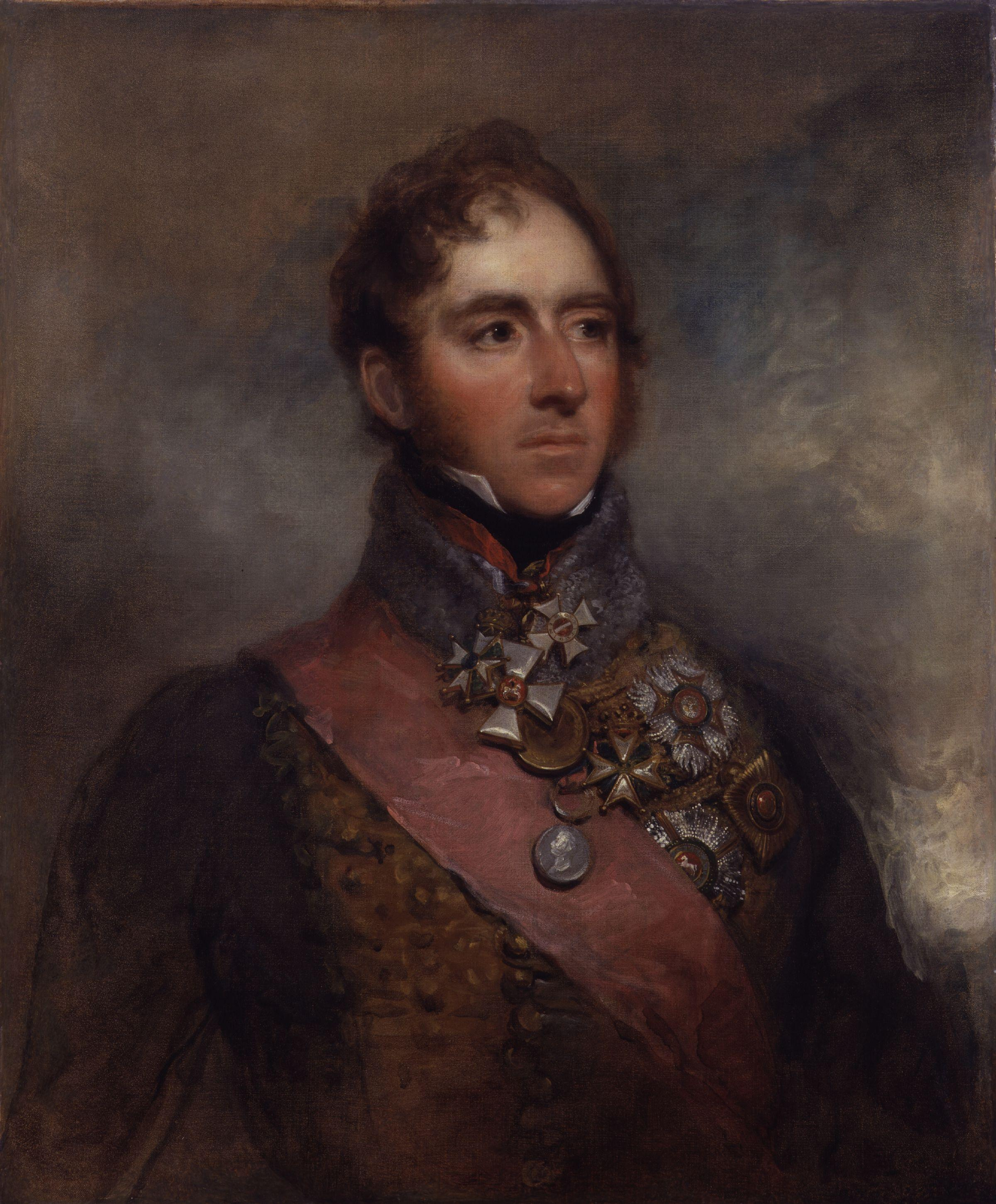
In 1809 Wellesley's first wife, Charlotte, ran away with Lord Paget leading to public scandal and a divorce.

Cowley married Lady Charlotte, daughter of Charles Cadogan, 1st Earl Cadogan in 1803, but they divorced by a private act of Parliament, Wellesley's Divorce Act 1810 (50 Geo. 3. c. 1 Pr.), after she ran away with Henry Paget, Lord Paget, later 1st Marquess of Anglesey. He later remarried, to Lady Georgiana Cecil, daughter of James Cecil, 1st Marquess of Salisbury.

His eldest son, Henry Richard Charles Wellesley, followed in his father's footsteps as a diplomatist, holding the Paris embassy for fifteen years, and was eventually created Earl Cowley. Another son, Gerald Valerian Wellesley, became Dean of Windsor. His second son William became a captain in the Royal Navy.

Parliament of Ireland
| Preceded by Arthur Wesley; Clotworthy Taylor | Member of Parliament for Trim; 1795; With: Arthur Wesley | Succeeded by Arthur Wesley; William Arthur Crosbie |
Parliament of the United Kingdom
| Preceded by George Tierney | Member of Parliament for Athlone; 1807 | Succeeded by John Frewen-Turner |
| Preceded by Marquess of Huntly; James Cornwallis | Member of Parliament for Eye; 1807–1809; With: James Cornwallis; Mark Singleton | Succeeded by Charles Arbuthnot; Mark Singleton |
Diplomatic posts
| Preceded by The Marquess Wellesley | British Ambassador to Spain; 1809–1821 | Succeeded by Sir William à Court |
| Preceded by The Marquess of Londonderry | British Ambassador to Austria; 1823–1831 | Succeeded by Sir Frederick Lamb |
| Preceded by The Earl Granville | British Ambassador to France; 1835 | Succeeded by The Earl Granville |
| Preceded by The Earl Granville | British Ambassador to France; 1841–1846 | Succeeded by The Marquess of Normanby |
Peerage of the United Kingdom
| New creation | Baron Cowley; 1828–1847 | Succeeded by Henry Wellesley |
