= Marjorie Paget, Marchioness of Anglesey =

British writer on art, illustrator and member of the peerage

The Most Honourable The Marchioness of Anglesey
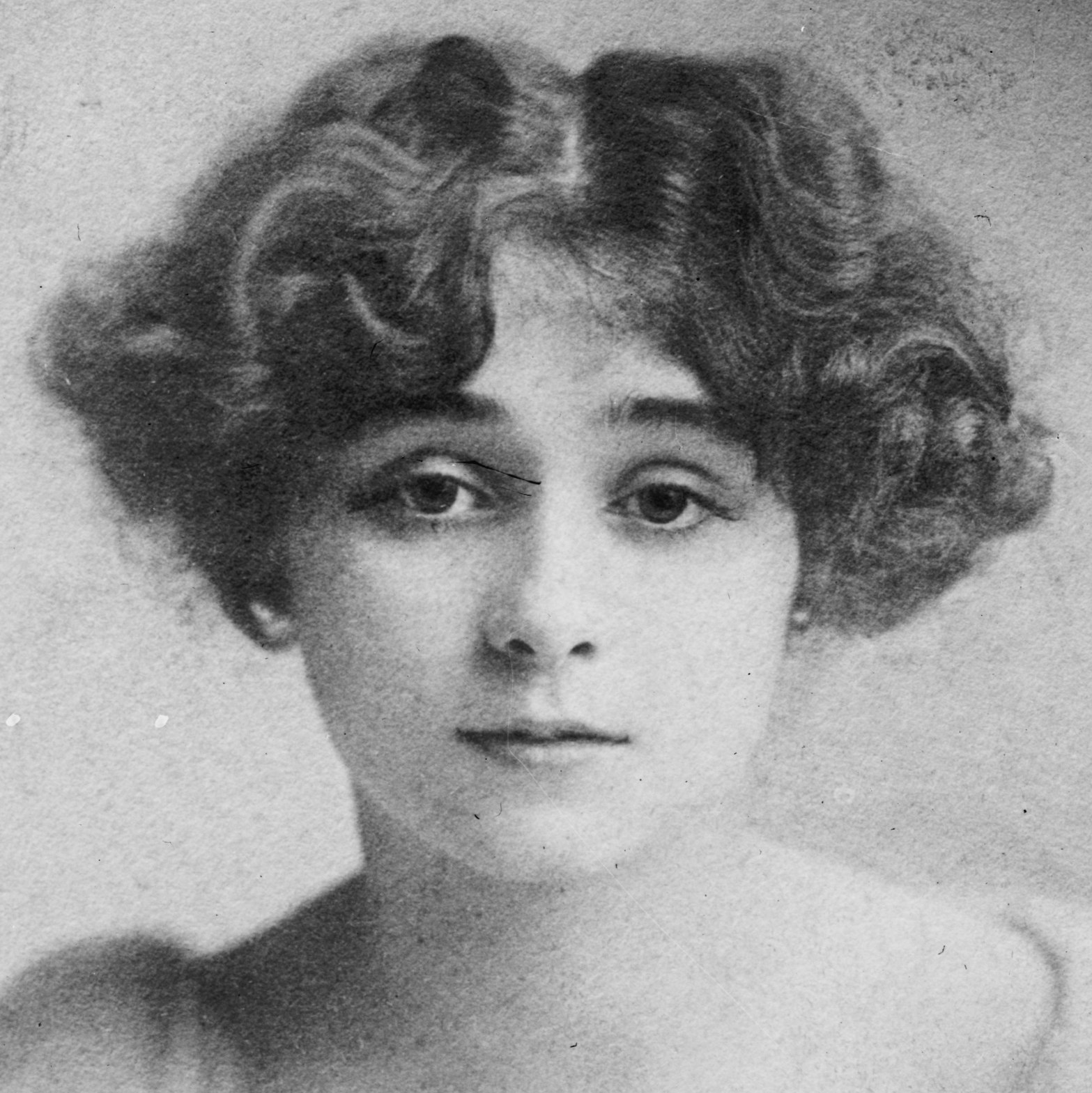
- Lady Victoria Manners
- Born: Victoria Marjorie Harriet Manners; 20 December 1883
- Died: 3 November 1946 (aged 62)
- Occupations: Writer, illustrator
- Spouse: Charles Paget, 6th Marquess of Anglesey (m. 1912)
- Children: Lady Caroline Paget; Lady Elizabeth von Hofmannsthal; Lady Mary Paget; Lady Rose McLaren; George Paget, 7th Marquess of Anglesey; Lady Katharine Paget
- Parents: Henry Manners, 8th Duke of Rutland; Violet Lindsay

Victoria Marjorie Harriet Paget, Marchioness of Anglesey (née Manners; 20 December 1883 – 3 November 1946) was a British writer on art, an illustrator, and a member of the peerage.

== Biography ==
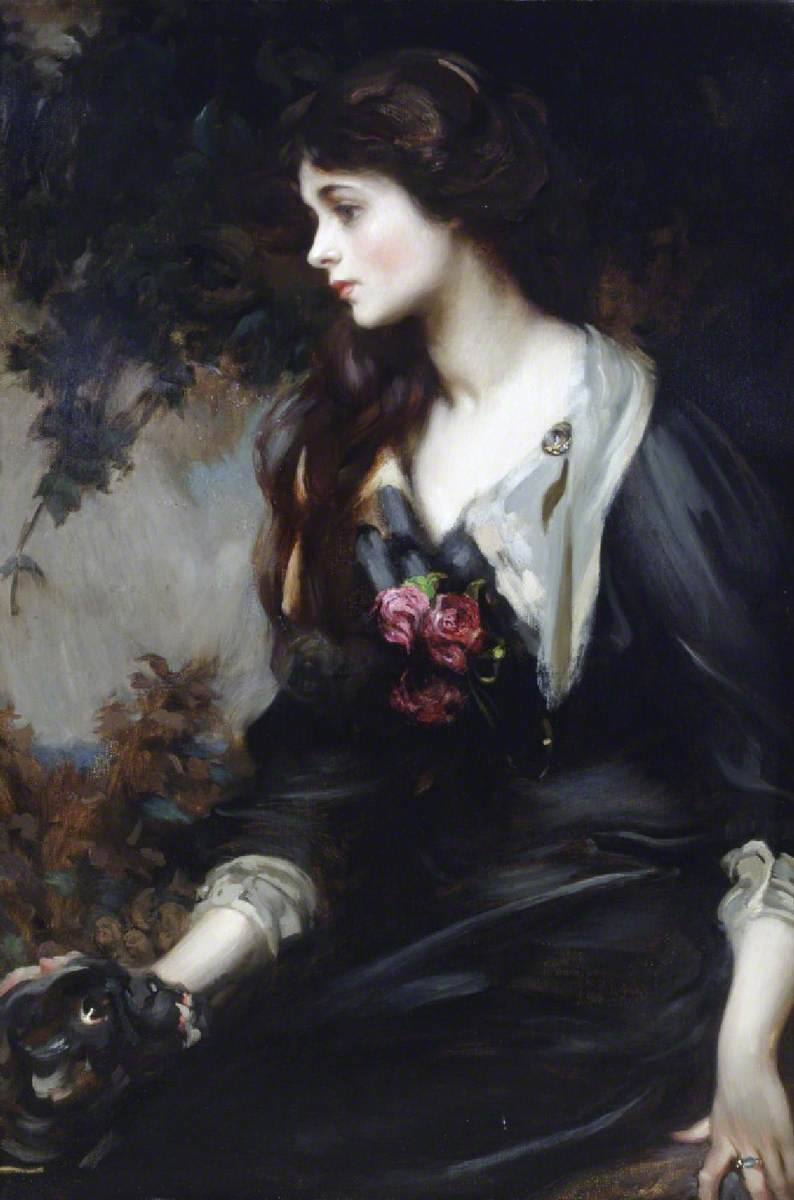
Lady Marjorie Manners (1883–1946) by James Jebusa Shannon (1862-1923), aged 17. National Trust.

Lady Victoria was the eldest daughter of Henry Manners, 8th Duke of Rutland, a British peer, and the former Marion Margaret Violet Lindsay, an artist. Her brother John was an art expert who became the 9th Duke of Rutland, and her sister Diana was an actor, author, and socialite.

In 1920, she coauthored (with art historian G.C. Williamson) a study of the neoclassical painter Johan Zoffany that is considered the first in-depth study of the artist. Johan Zoffany, R. A.: His Life and Works 1735–1810 was published in a limited edition of 500 copies, privately printed.

She and Williamson also cowrote a study of the painter Angelica Kauffmann, one of only two women artists who were founding members of the Royal Academy of Arts (RA). Angelica Kauffmann, R.A.: Her Life and Her Works (1924) was prompted by the discovery in the RA archives of a manuscript in Kauffmann's handwriting, written in Italian and previously untranslated, which gives an account of Kauffmann's paintings post-1781. Manners and Williamson wrote that this enabled them to "come to certain definite conclusions regarding many pictures hitherto ascribed to other artists." They included numerous reproductions in both color and black-and-white on the grounds that prior books on Kauffman had presented inadequate reproductions of her paintings.

Among her other books is one on the portrait and genre painter William Peters. She also wrote articles on art for magazines like The Conoisseur.

Manners illustrated Alicia Amherst's London Parks and Gardens (1907), which is considered the first serious and deeply informed book on London's open spaces.

== Marriage and children ==
In 1912, she married Charles Paget, 6th Marquess of Anglesey, a British peer, farmer, and soldier, and thereby became the Marchioness of Anglesey. Their wedding was performed by the Archbishop of Canterbury. They had six children:

- Lady Alexandra Mary Cecilia Caroline Paget (1913–1973), who married Sir Michael Duff, 3rd Baronet;
- Lady Elizabeth Hester Mary Paget (1916–1980), who married Raimund von Hofmannsthal, son of Austrian writer Hugo von Hofmannsthal and ex-husband of Ava Alice Muriel Astor;
- Lady Mary Patricia Beatrice Rose Paget (1918–1996);
- Lady Rose Mary Primrose Paget (1919–2005), who married John Francis McLaren;
- George Charles Henry Victor Paget (1922–2013), Earl of Uxbridge and later the 7th Marquess of Anglesey;
- Lady Katharine Mary Veronica Paget (1922-2017).

== Residences ==
Before the First World War, Manners and her family lived primarily at Beaudesert, the family seat of the Paget family in South Staffordshire. After the war, they moved to Plas Newydd, a large country house in Wales that features extensive trompe-l'œil murals by the artist Rex Whistler.
