= Henry Paget, 5th Marquess of Anglesey =

British peer

The Most Honourable The Marquess of Anglesey
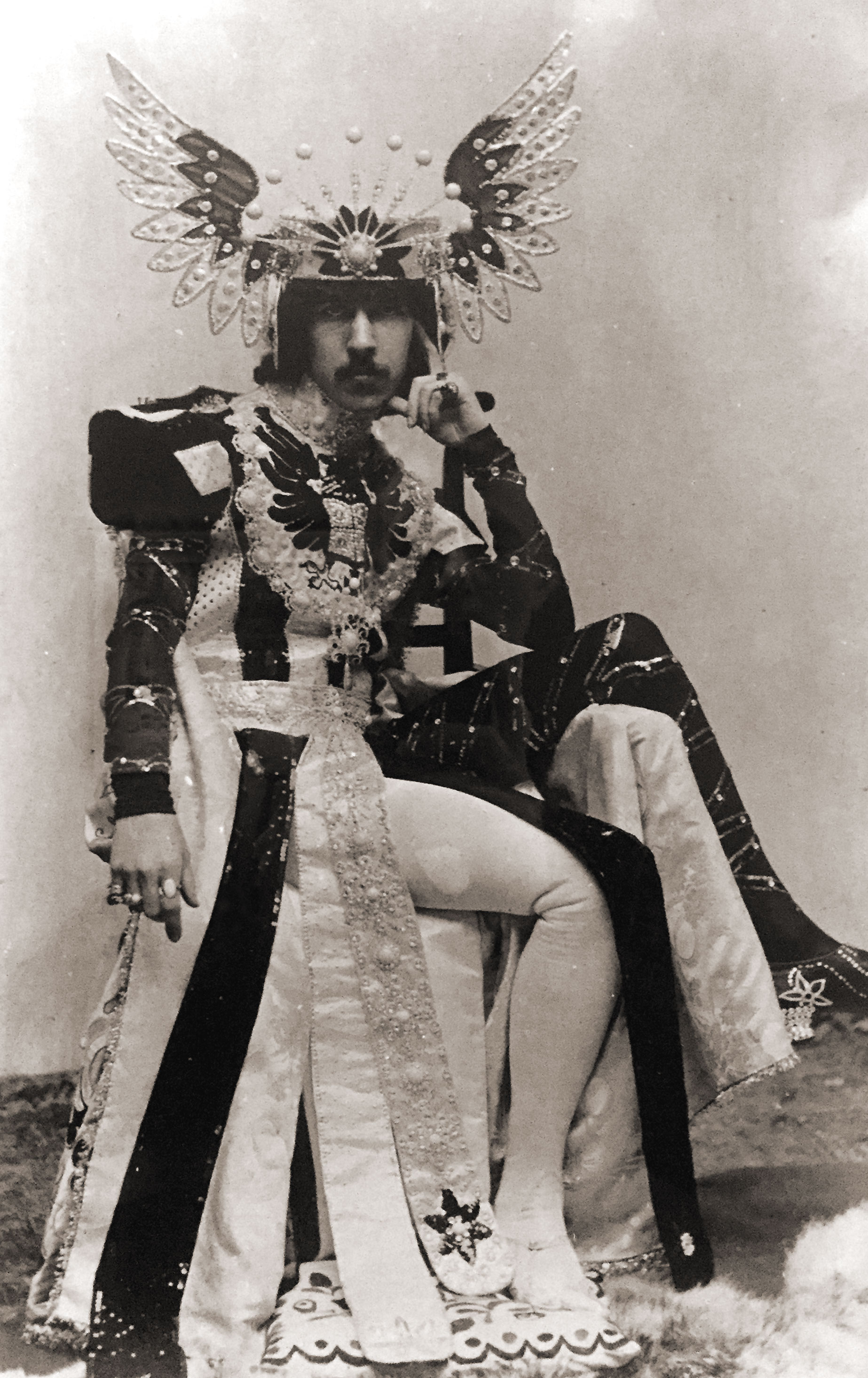
- Lord Anglesey c. 1900, by Welsh photographer John Wickens

Personal details
- Born: 16 June 1875 France
- Died: 14 March 1905 (aged 29) Monte Carlo, Monaco
- Spouse: Lilian Florence Maud Chetwynd (m. 1898)
- Parent(s): Henry Paget, 4th Marquess of Anglesey; Blanche Mary Boyd
- Education: Eton College

Henry Cyril Paget, 5th Marquess of Anglesey (16 June 1875 – 14 March 1905), styled Lord Paget until 1880 and Earl of Uxbridge between 1880 and 1898, and nicknamed "Toppy", was a British peer who was notable during his short life for squandering his inheritance on a lavish social life and accumulating massive debts. Regarded as the "black sheep" of the family, he was dubbed "the dancing marquess" for his Butterfly Dancing, taken from Loie Fuller, where a voluminous robe of transparent white silk would be waved like wings.

Vicary Gibbs, writing in The Complete Peerage in 1910, commented that he "seems only to have existed for the purpose of giving a melancholy and unneeded illustration of the truth that a man with the finest prospects, may, by the wildest folly and extravagance, as Sir Thomas Browne says, 'foully miscarry in the advantage of humanity, play away an uniterable life, and have lived in vain.'"

== Family background ==
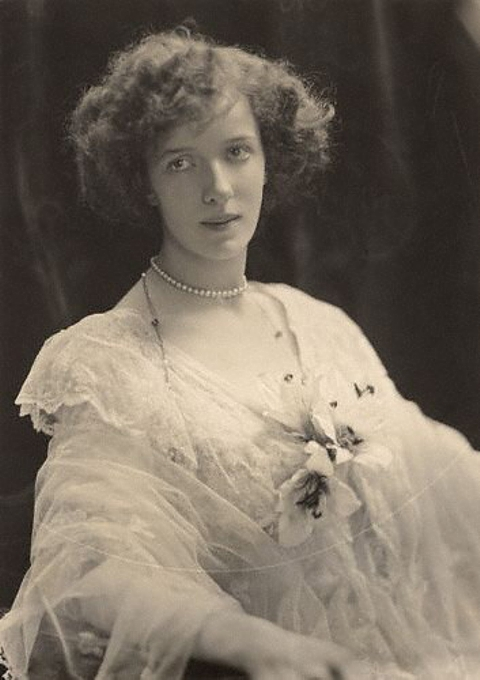
Lilian Florence Maud Chetwynd, Paget's wife

Paget was the eldest son of the 4th Marquess by his father's second wife, Blanche Mary Boyd. However, a rumour persisted that his biological father was the French actor Benoît-Constant Coquelin. This gained some currency, according to some sources, after the death of his mother in 1877, when he was two years old; it was claimed that Paget was brought up by Coquelin's sister-in-law in Paris until he was eight. That story seems to have been a confusion of facts. The sister-in-law, née Edith Marion Boyd, was the 4th Marquess's aunt, one of his mother's sisters, and she did not wed Coquelin's brother Gustave until 1891. His stepmother from 1880 was an American, Mary "Minna" Livingston King, the widow of the Hon. Henry Wodehouse.

He attended Eton College, later receiving private tuition, and was commissioned as a Lieutenant in the 2nd Volunteer Battalion of the Royal Welch Fusiliers.

=== Marriage ===
On 20 January 1898, the then Earl of Uxbridge married his first cousin, Lilian Florence Maud Chetwynd (1876–1962), daughter of Sir George Chetwynd, 4th Baronet, and Lady Florence Paget (1842–1907), sister to the 4th Marquess. Upon the death of his father on 13 October 1898, he inherited the Marquessate and the family estates with about 30,000 acres (120 km^{2}) in Staffordshire, Dorset, Anglesey, and Derbyshire, providing an annual income of £110,000 (equivalent to £15 million per year in 2025).

== Lifestyle ==
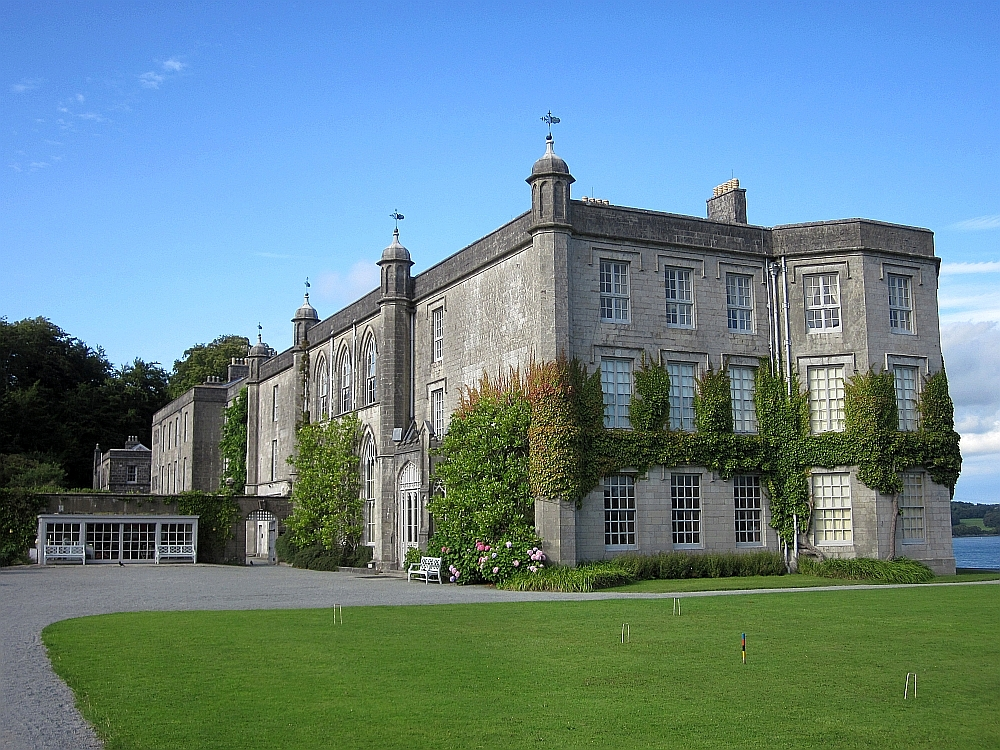
Plas Newydd, Lord Anglesey's country house on Anglesey

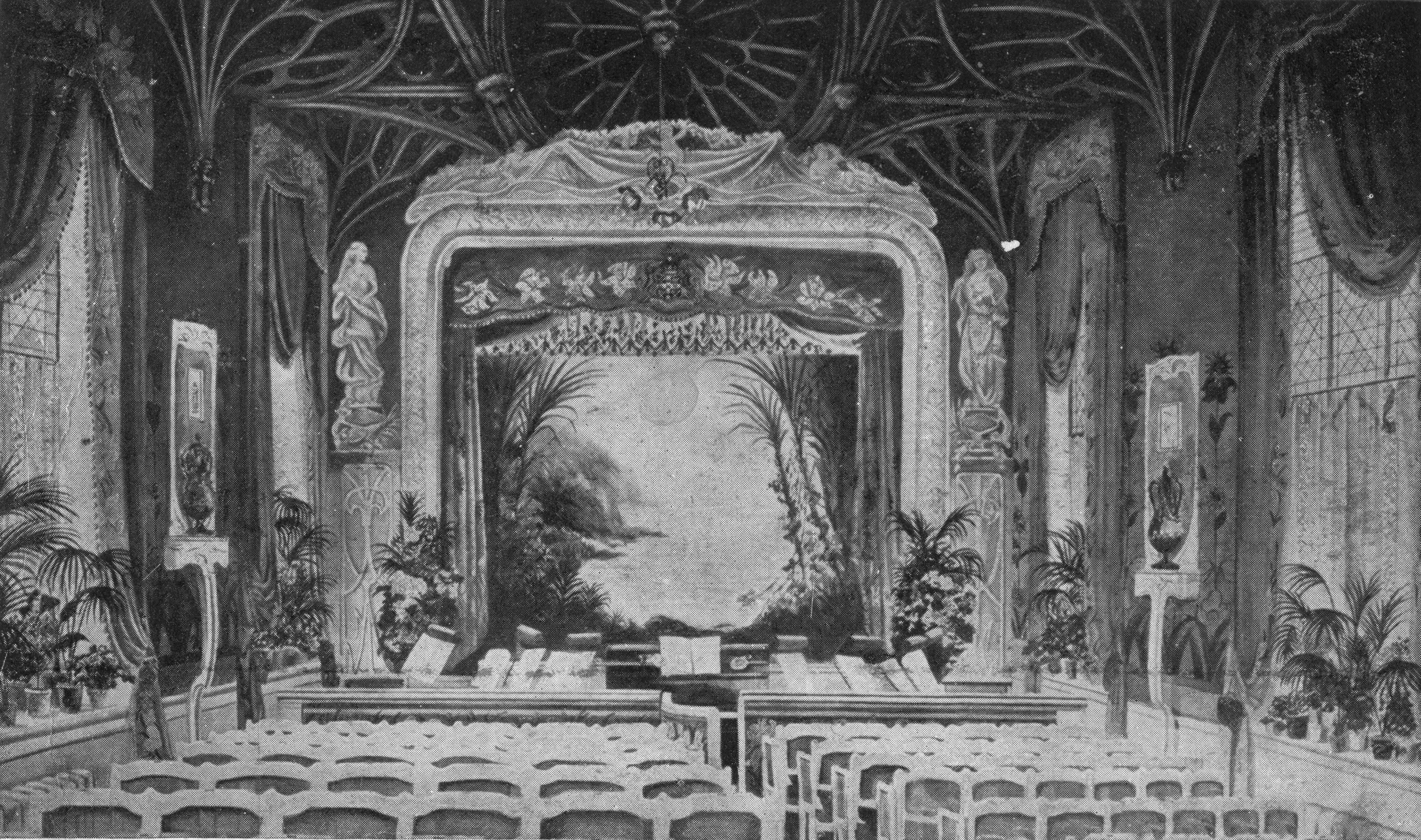
Interior of Lord Anglesey's Gaiety Theatre at Plas Newydd

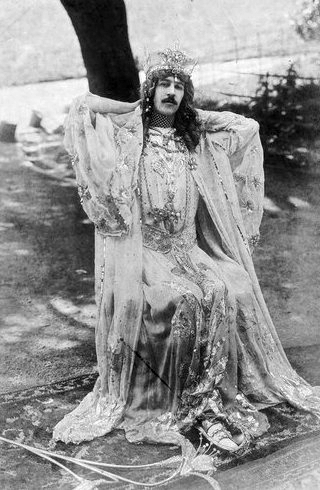
Lord Anglesey in theatrical costume, c.1900

Lord Anglesey, as he now was, swiftly acquired a reputation for a lavish and spendthrift manner of living. He used his money to buy jewellery and furs, and to throw extravagant parties and flamboyant theatrical performances. He renamed the family's country seat, Plas Newydd, as "Anglesey Castle" and converted the chapel there into a 150-seat theatre, named the Gaiety Theatre. Here he took the lead role, opulently costumed, in productions ranging from pantomime and comedy to performances of Oscar Wilde's An Ideal Husband and Shakespeare's Henry V. Early performances from around 1899 were mostly variety performances of song and dance numbers, sketches and tableaux vivants in front of an invited audience of notable local people. In 1901, the Gaiety Theatre was refurbished and fitted out with electric stage lighting and re-opened as a public entertainment venue.

For three years, Lord Anglesey took his theatre company on tour around Britain and Europe. His wife disapproved of his lifestyle and obtained a decree nisi of divorce on 7 November 1900; the marriage was later annulled due to nonconsummation, according to Lady Anglesey's grandson by her second marriage, the historian Christopher Simon Sykes. The breakdown of his marriage effectively gave Lord Anglesey more freedom to enjoy his self-indulgent lifestyle. By this stage, he had already begun to mortgage his estates to raise money.

=== Theft ===
On 10 September 1901, Anglesey attended the London premiere of Arthur Conan Doyle's stage adaptation of Sherlock Holmes at the Lyceum Theatre in London. At the time, Anglesey was living in the Walsingham House Hotel in London. Lord Anglesey's French valet Julian Gault took the opportunity of his employer's absence at the theatre to steal jewellery to the value of £50,000. Distraught at the theft, Anglesey enlisted the help of Conan Doyle to find the stolen jewels. Gault, who was later arrested at Dover, testified in court that he had been instructed to steal the jewels by a French woman of his acquaintance called Mathilde (who had taken the jewels to France and was never found). Although Gault's testimony was believed to be true, he pleaded guilty at the Old Bailey on 22 October and was sentenced to five years' imprisonment.

== Sexuality ==
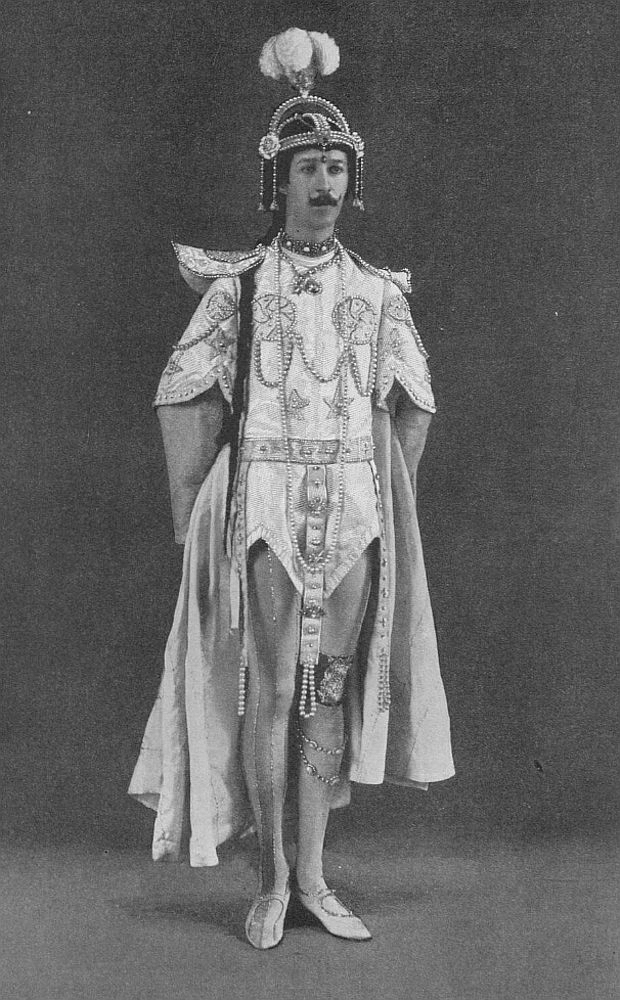
Another of Anglesey's flamboyant costumes, c.1900

Lord Anglesey's outrageous and flamboyant lifestyle, his taste for cross-dressing, and the breakdown of his marriage, have led many to assume that he was homosexual. Writing in 1970, the campaigner for homosexual law reform H. Montgomery Hyde characterised him as "[t]he most notorious aristocratic homosexual at this period". One journalist wrote, "I am driven to the conclusion from much that I have seen that there are men who ought to have been born women, and women who ought to have been born men … Bearing the form of a man, he yet had all the tastes, something even of the appearance, of not only a woman, but, if the phrase be permissible, a very effeminate woman". Norena Shopland wrote that "there is little doubt that Henry must be included in the history of gender identity."

There is no evidence for or against his having had any lovers of either sex since the deliberate destruction by his family of those of his papers that might have settled this matter has left any assessment speculative at best. Performance historian Viv Gardner gives her opinion that she thought him as "a classic narcissist: the only person he could love and make love to was himself, because, for whatever reason, he was 'unlovable'".

According to Christopher Sykes, he did not have sexual relations with his wife, who initially left him after just six weeks. Sykes has reported: "The closest the marriage ever came to consummation was that he would make her pose naked covered top to bottom in jewels and she had to sleep wearing the jewels".

== Financial trouble and death ==
By 1904, despite his inheritance and income, Lord Anglesey had accumulated debts of £544,000 (£60 million in 2025) and on 11 June was declared bankrupt. His lavish wardrobe, particularly his dressing gowns from Charvet, and jewels were sold to pay creditors, the jewels alone realising £80,000.

In March 1905, Lord Anglesey died in Monte Carlo following a long illness, with his ex-wife by his side, and his remains were returned to St Edwen's Church, Llanedwen, on his Anglesey estate, for burial. The Times reported that despite all that was known of him, he remained much liked by the people of Bangor, who were sorry to hear of his death. In 1909, Lilian, Marchioness of Anglesey, married John Francis Grey Gilliat (a banker) by whom she had three children.

The title passed to his first cousin Charles Henry Alexander Paget, who destroyed all the papers of the 5th Marquess and converted the Gaiety Theatre back into a chapel. It was at least in part owing to the debts left by the 5th Marquess that the family's principal English estate at Beaudesert, Staffordshire, had to be broken up and sold in the 1930s. The Paget family moved into Plas Newydd as their permanent residence.

== Legacy ==
Plas Newydd remained in the possession of the Paget family until 1976, when it was donated to the National Trust. Today, the house and gardens are open to the public, and the house contains an art collection that includes a number of photographs of the 5th Marquess in theatrical costume.

In March 2020, a diamond tiara claimed to have probably been worn by the 5th Marquess in his stage productions was put up for auction by the family at the 2020 European Fine Art Fair in Maastricht. The tiara was apparently retained after the auctions were held to repay the debts accrued by the 5th Marquess, and it was later worn by Marjorie, Marchioness of Anglesey (wife of the 6th Marquess), at the coronation of King George VI in 1937. (Note: The BBC source states that the tiara was worn in 1952 by Marjorie, Marchioness of Anglesey, at the Coronation of Elizabeth II, alongside her husband, the 6th Marquess of Anglesey, but this is impossible, given that Marjorie died in 1946 and the 6th Marquess died in 1947; and the picture clearly shows her son, the 7th Marquess of Anglesey.)

Lord Anglesey's style has often been compared to that of the flamboyant rock star Freddie Mercury.

In 2017, the actor and composer Seiriol Davies wrote and performed in How To Win Against History, a musical based on Lord Anglesey's life. The award-winning show was performed at the 2017 Edinburgh Festival Fringe before a tour of England and Wales. In 2019, the show had its Irish premiere at the Dublin Theatre Festival.

The British-American fashion designer Harris Reed cited Lord Anglesey as an inspiration for his 2020 collection Thriving In Our Outrage.

The biopic Madfabulous, starring Callum Scott Howells as Lord Anglesey, was released in cinemas in the UK in June 2026.

== Sources ==
- Cokayne, G. E.; Gibbs, Vicary, eds. (1910). The Complete Peerage of England, Scotland, Ireland, Great Britain and the United Kingdom, extant, extinct or dormant. Vol. 1 (2nd ed.). London: St Catherine Press. p. 141.
- "Obituary: Lord Anglesey". The Times. London, UK. 15 March 1905. p. 10.
- Shopland, Norena (2017). "The Butterfly Dancer". Forbidden Lives: lesbian, gay, bisexual and transgender stories from Wales. Bridgend: Seren Books. ISBN 9781781724101.
- Sykes, Christopher Simon (1982). Black Sheep. London: Chatto & Windus. ISBN 0-7011-2548-9.

Peerage of the United Kingdom
Preceded by Henry Paget	Marquess of Anglesey; 1898–1905	Succeeded by Charles Paget
