= Lady Rose McLaren =

British aristocrat, ballerina and florist

- Born: Lady Rose Mary Primrose Paget; 21 July 1919
- Died: 1 November 2005 (aged 86)
- Spouse: John Francis McLaren (m. 1940; died 1953)
- Children: 2
- Parent(s): Charles Paget, 6th Marquess of Anglesey; Marjorie Paget, Marchioness of Anglesey

Lady Rose Mary Primrose McLaren (née Paget; 21 July 1919 – 1 November 2005) was a British aristocrat, the fourth daughter of the 6th Marquess of Anglesey.

The Paget family (the Marquesses of Anglesey) resided in Plas Newydd and Beaudesert in Staffordshire until the house was demolished in 1931, due to financial difficulties.

Lady Rose Paget, as she was before her marriage, was the fourth of five daughters. Her brother was the 7th Marquess of Anglesey. Another of Paget's sisters, Mary, was brain-damaged, and Paget made herself responsible for her sister's welfare until her death in 1996.

In her teens, Paget trained as a ballet dancer with Marie Rambert, and under the name Rose Bayly made her debut at Sadler's Wells in Swan Lake in 1937. After being largely educated at home, Paget led an unconventional life, being at different times a ballerina, a florist, a land girl and a countrywoman.

Twice engaged to the 8th Duke of Wellington, Paget eventually married Squadron Leader The Hon. John Francis McLaren, the second son of the 2nd Baron Aberconway in 1940. He died in 1953. The McLarens had two daughters, Victoria and Harriet.

In her widowhood, McLaren became friends with Muriel Belcher (founder of the club, the Colony Room) and the artist Francis Bacon. At about this time McLaren established her florist's business, which operated from the basement of her house in Chelsea. Along with Pamela Forster (the daughter of Lord Forster of Harraby and a former employee of Constance Spry), they supplied the flowers for the wedding of Princess Margaret to Antony Armstrong Jones in 1960.

McLaren left London in 1975 and returned to Wales, retiring to her house on the Bodnant Estate. In later life, McLaren held several prominent positions including County chairwoman of Macmillan Nurses, president of Conwy's Churchill Club and president of the Eglwysbach Show.

McLaren died on 1 November 2005 at the age of 86.
