= Caroline Paget =

Caroline Paget may refer to:

- Caroline Campbell, Duchess of Argyll (1774-1835), wife of Henry Paget, future Marquess of Anglesey, until their divorce in 1810, and subsequently the wife of George Campbell, 6th Duke of Argyll, a friend of her first husband.
- Lady Caroline Paget (1913–1973), daughter of Charles Paget, 6th Marquess of Anglesey and Lady Victoria Manners, eldest daughter of the 8th Duke of Rutland.
