= Charles Paget, 6th Marquess of Anglesey =

British peer, farmer and soldier (1885–1947)

Lieutenant-Colonel The Most Honourable The Marquess of Anglesey GCVO CStJ DL
- The Marquess of Anglesey, c. 1910s

Marquess of Anglesey
- In office 14 March 1905 – 21 February 1947

Personal details
- Born: 14 April 1885 Mayfair, London, England
- Died: 21 February 1947 (aged 61) London, England
- Spouse: Lady Marjorie Manners (m. 1912; died 1946)
- Children: Lady Caroline Duff; Lady Elizabeth von Hofmannsthal; Lady Mary Paget; Lady Rose McLaren; George Paget, 7th Marquess of Anglesey; Lady Katharine Farrel
- Parents: Lord Alexander Paget; Hester Alice Stapleton-Cotton
- Education: Eton College; Royal Military College, Sandhurst

Lieutenant-Colonel Charles Henry Alexander Paget, 6th Marquess of Anglesey, GCVO, CStJ, DL (14 April 1885 – 21 February 1947) was a British peer, farmer and soldier.

== Biography ==
Paget was born in 1885 to Lord Alexander Paget, third son of Henry Paget, 2nd Marquess of Anglesey, and to Hester Alice Stapleton-Cotton, daughter of Wellington Stapleton-Cotton, 2nd Viscount Combermere. He was educated at Eton and the Royal Military College, Sandhurst. In 1905, he succeeded as Marquess of Anglesey on the demise of his childless first cousin, the 5th Marquess. He was also Earl of Uxbridge, Baron Paget, and the 9th Baronet Paget, of Plas Newydd.

== Career ==
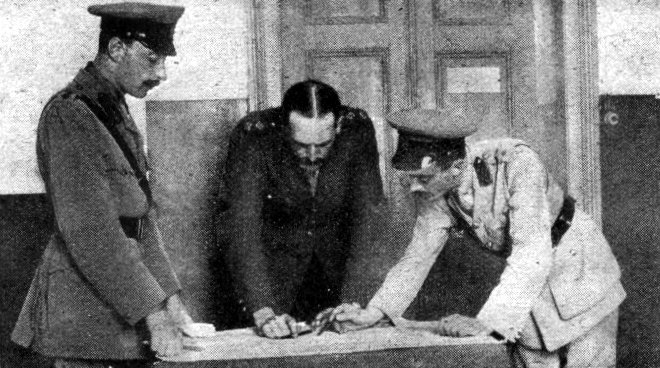
Lord Anglesey (centre) with Prince Alexander of Battenberg and Captain Walford in Cairo, early 1915

Anglesey briefly served in the Royal Horse Guards before his election as Mayor of Burton upon Trent from 1911 to 1912. Within the first month of the First World War, he rejoined the Royal Horse Guards and was sent to France, but was invalided out. He returned to serve as aide-de-camp to Sir John Maxwell, the General Officer Commanding in Egypt – for which he was decorated with the Order of the Nile (4th class) in 1918 – and to Sir William Birdwood in Gallipoli. He later served as Assistant Military Secretary to the General Officer Commanding in Ireland in 1916. He served in the Home Guard in World War II.

The 6th Marquess of Anglesey was Lord Chamberlain to Queen Mary from 1922 until his death in 1947. In the 1928 New Year Honours, he was appointed Knight Grand Cross of the Royal Victorian Order (GCVO). In 1931, he was invested as an Officer in the Order of Saint John, and promoted to Commander of the Order in 1944.

He was Lord Lieutenant of Anglesey from 1942 until his death.

== Marriage and children ==
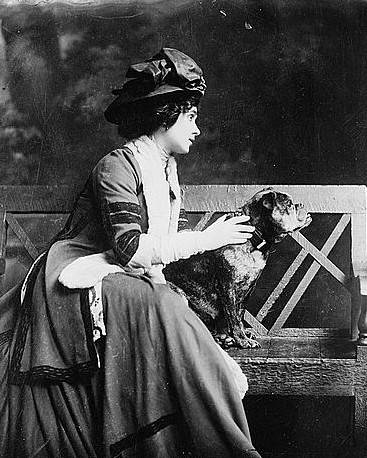
Paget's wife, Lady Victoria Manners, 1912

On 3 August 1912, he married Lady Victoria Manners, a daughter of the 8th Duke of Rutland, in a grand ceremony performed by the Archbishop of Canterbury and attended by Prince Arthur of Connaught. They had six children:

- Lady Alexandra Mary Cecilia Caroline Paget (15 June 1913 – 22 May 1973 (aged 59)), married Sir Michael Duff, 3rd Baronet
- Lady Elizabeth Hester Mary Paget (1916–1980), married Raimund von Hofmannsthal, son of Hugo von Hofmannsthal
- Lady Mary Patricia Beatrice Rose Paget (19 January 1918 – 28 March 1996 (aged 78)), died unmarried
- Lady Rose Mary Primrose Paget (27 July 1919 – 1 November 2005 (aged 86)), married John Francis McLaren
- George Charles Henry Victor Paget, Earl of Uxbridge (afterwards 7th Marquess) (8 October 1922 – 13 July 2013 (aged 90))
- Lady Katharine Mary Veronica Paget (8 Oct 1922 – 7 February 2017 (aged 94)), married (1) Jocelyn Eustace Gurney, (2) Charles Farrell

The Marquess died in London, aged 61, following an operation.

== Residences ==
Until World War I, the 6th Marquess of Anglesey mainly lived at Beaudesert, the Paget family estate and stately home on the southern edge of Cannock Chase in Staffordshire. Heavy taxation after the war, combined with the considerable debts resulting from the extravagant lifestyle of the 5th Marquess, meant that the 6th Marquess could no longer afford to maintain the property at Beaudesert, so in 1920 he left to live at Plas Newydd. The Beaudesert estate was broken up and sold off, with the Marquess donating 120 acres of land to the Cannock Chase District in 1920, and a further gift in 1938 was made to the people of Staffordshire.

At Plas Newydd, the 6th Marquess commissioned the artist Rex Whistler to undertake a decorative mural scheme. The trompe-l'œil paintings and murals and a permanent exhibition of Whistler memorabilia are now one of the major attractions at the property.

== Honours ==
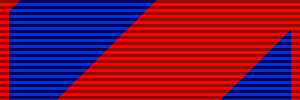

Ribbon	Description	Notes
	Royal Victorian Order (GCVO)	Knight Grand Cross; 1928 New Years Honours List
	Order of St John (C.StJ)	Commander 1944; Officer 1931
	1914 Star	
	British War Medal	
	WWI Victory Medal	
	Defence Medal	For Service in the Home Guard during World War II
	King George V Silver Jubilee Medal	6 May 1935
	King George VI Coronation Medal	12 May 1937
	Order of the Nile	4th Class 1918

- In 1912 He was awarded the Freedom of the County Borough of Stoke-on-Trent.

Honorary titles
Preceded by Sir Richard Williams-Bulkeley	Lord Lieutenant of Anglesey; 1942–1947	Succeeded by Sir Richard Williams Bulkeley
Peerage of the United Kingdom
Preceded by Henry Paget	Marquess of Anglesey; 1905–1947	Succeeded by Henry Paget
