= Broadcasting Complaints Commission (UK) =

The Broadcasting Complaints Commission in the United Kingdom existed from 1 June 1981 to 1 April 1997. Along with the Broadcasting Standards Council (established 16 May 1988) it was then replaced by the Broadcasting Standards Commission. This was itself abolished and replaced by Ofcom on 29 December 2003.

Its chair from 1987 to 1991 was Shirley Paget, Marchioness of Anglesey.
