= Lord Lieutenant of Gwynedd =

Welsh county ceremonial officer

This is an incomplete list of people who have served as Lord Lieutenant for Gwynedd. The office was created on 1 April 1974.

- Sir Richard Williams-Bulkeley, 13th Baronet 1 April 1974 – 1980? (formerly Lord Lieutenant of Anglesey) with two lieutenants:
  - Sir Michael Duff, 3rd Baronet (formerly Lord Lieutenant of Caernarvonshire) 1 April 1974 – 3 March 1980
  - Col. John Francis Williams-Wynne, (formerly Lord Lieutenant of Merionethshire) 1 April 1974 – 1983?
- Henry Paget, 7th Marquess of Anglesey 18 October 1983 – 5 March 1990
- Sir Richard Ellis Meuric Rees 5 March 1990 – 24 February 2000
- Prof. Eric Sunderland 24 February 2000 – 21 October 2005
- Huw Morgan Daniel 1 May 2006 – 2014
- Edmund Seymour Bailey 16 April 2014 – present
