= Capriccio (Rex Whistler) =

Mural at Plas Newydd, Anglesey

Capriccio is a large wall mural by the English painter Rex Whistler (1905–1944). It hangs in the dining room of Plas Newydd, the historic home of the Marquesses of Anglesey, now owned by the National Trust, which has views over the Menai Strait and the mountains of Snowdonia in North Wales. The mural is Whistler's largest work, and also the largest canvas painting in the United Kingdom.

The work was executed onsite between 1936 and 1938. It is 58 feet long, taking up an entire wall of the dining room. It is a trompe-l'œil harbour scene and seascape, its subject matter is Italianate in style but mixes views of "British and Italian buildings, and the mountains of Snowdonia".

The mural includes a self-portrait of Whistler carrying a broom as the work continues into the south-side colonnade.

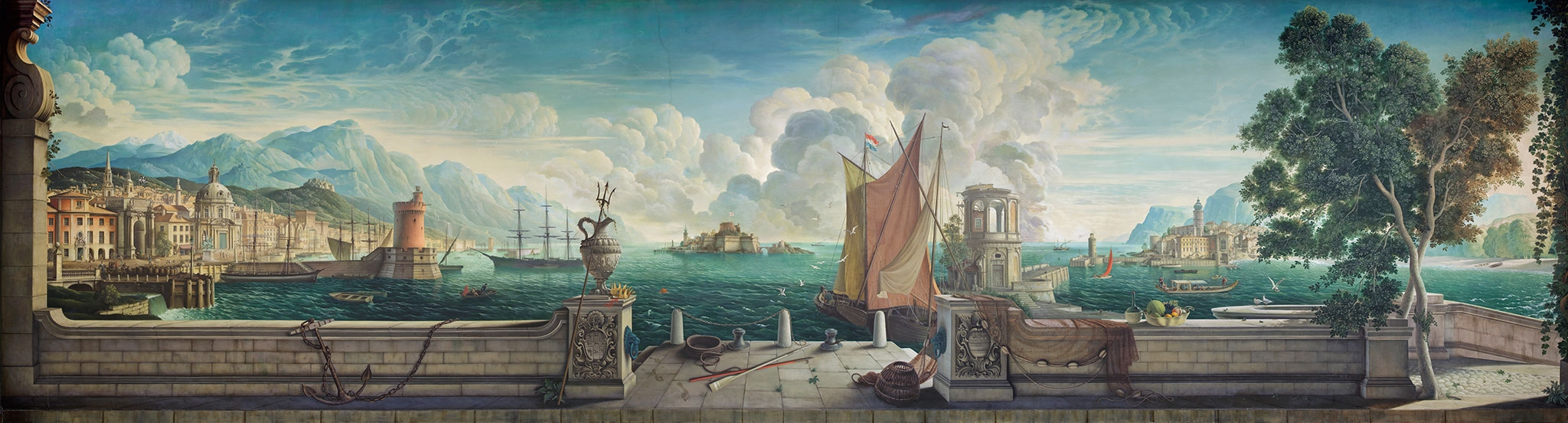
Capriccio mural at Plas Newydd, the "feature panel" of the dining room
