= Shirley Paget, Marchioness of Anglesey =

British writer

The Most Honourable The Marchioness of Anglesey DBE LVO
- Born: Elizabeth Shirley Vaughan Morgan; 4 December 1924; Chelsea, London
- Died: 21 January 2017 (aged 92); Hindhead, Surrey, England
- Spouse: Henry Paget, 7th Marquess of Anglesey (m. 1948; died 2013)
- Children: 5, including Charles Paget, 8th Marquess of Anglesey
- Writing career
- Notable work: The Countrywoman's Year
- Notable awards: President of the National Federation of Women's Institutes

Elizabeth Shirley Vaughan Paget, Marchioness of Anglesey DBE, LVO (née Morgan; 4 December 1924 – 21 January 2017), better known as Dame Shirley Paget, was a British public servant and writer.

== Early life and education ==
She was born in Chelsea, London, the daughter of novelists Charles Langbridge Morgan and Hilda Vaughan and granddaughter of engineer Sir Charles Langbridge Morgan. She was named after the heroine in Charlotte Brontë's 1849 novel Shirley.

She and her younger brother, Roger Morgan (1926–2018), grew up in Notting Hill, London. She was educated at Francis Holland School and Malvern St James until the Second World War, when she, her brother, and their mother moved to America. She finished her schooling at Kent Place School in New Jersey.

== Career ==
Shirley Morgan began her career in the Foreign Office as personal secretary to Gladwyn Jebb until her marriage to Lord Anglesey in 1949.

As Marchioness of Anglesey, she served as President of the National Federation of Women's Institutes 1966–1969, a board member of the British Council 1985–1995, chairman of the Broadcasting Complaints Commission 1987–1991, and vice-chairman of the Museums and Galleries Commission 1989–1996.

As an author she wrote The Countrywoman's Year (1960).

== Personal life ==
She married Henry Paget, 7th Marquess of Anglesey (8 October 1922 – 13 July 2013) on 16 October 1948, a year after he succeeded to the marquisate. They had met at the 1946 Paris peace conference. Queen Mary was a guest at their wedding as King George V was a godfather of the groom. Their marriage produced three daughters and two sons.

Along with her husband, she attended the Coronation in 1952 of Elizabeth II. At the time of her husband's death in 2013, it was believed they were the only living married couple apart from Elizabeth II and Prince Philip to have attended the Coronation.

She died in 2017, aged 92, at a Moorlands Lodge nursing home in Surrey.

== Honours ==
Paget was invested as a Commander of the Order of the British Empire (CBE) in 1977. She was invested as a Dame Commander, Order of the British Empire (DBE) in 1983. She was later invested as a Lieutenant, Royal Victorian Order (LVO) in 1993.
