= Sir Michael Duff, 3rd Baronet =

British socialite (1907–1980)

Shield of the Duff baronets, of Vaynol Park

Sir Charles Michael Robert Vivian Duff, 3rd Baronet (3 May 1907 – 3 March 1980) was a British socialite who was Lord Lieutenant, first of Caernarvonshire, and then of Gwynedd.

== Family ==
Duff was the only son of Sir Robert George Vivian Duff, 2nd Baronet, of Vaynol (d.1914), and his wife, Lady Juliet Lowther (1881–1965), only child of the 4th Earl of Lonsdale by his wife, Constance Robinson, Marchioness of Ripon. His maternal grandmother was a sister of the 13th and 14th Earls of Pembroke and Montgomery, and a daughter of the Rt. Hon. Sidney Herbert, 1st Baron Herbert of Lea, the half-Russian younger son of the 10th Earl of Pembroke, and a good friend to Florence Nightingale. He had one sibling, Victoria Maud Veronica Duff (1904–1967, married John Edward Tennant). His stepfather from 1919 until 1926 was Major Keith Trevor.

He was a godson of Mary of Teck (queen of King George V). Handsome and good-mannered, he was famed as a host and raconteur. He inherited the 1,000 acres (4.0 km^{2}) Welsh estate of Vaynol (also known by its Welsh spelling 'Faenol'), the slate of which was the principal source of the family's wealth. Surrounded by the estate's seven-mile-long stone wall, the Duffs lived in Vaynol New Hall, which had been built in 1800. The medieval Vaynol Old Hall, also on the estate, was occupied by the farm manager and later the estate manager.

In 1928, Sir Michael assumed the additional surname of Assheton-Smith, only to renounce it in 1945. In 1930, he was a godfather to Antony Armstrong-Jones, 1st Earl of Snowdon, later husband of Princess Margaret. He served as High Sheriff of Anglesey for 1950. He then served as Mayor of Caernarvon, High Sheriff of Caernarvonshire (1932) and Lord Lieutenant of both Caernarvonshire and of Gwynedd.

He was a practical joker, one of his favourite pranks being to dress up as Queen Mary and pay surprise visits to friends - until he bumped into the Queen herself in a neighbour's hall. He also wrote a light novel, The Power Of A Parasol.

== Marriages ==
Sir Michael Duff-Assheton-Smith, as he then was, married first, on 5 March 1935, the Hon Millicent Joan Marjoribanks (born 1906), daughter of the 3rd and last Baron Tweedmouth. They divorced in July 1936, and the marriage was annulled in 1937.

Sir Michael Duff, as he had subsequently become, married as his second wife, on 14 July 1949, Lady (Alexandra Mary Cecilia) Caroline Paget (1913–73), the eldest daughter of Charles Paget, 6th Marquess of Anglesey, and his wife, Lady Marjorie Manners, the eldest daughter of Henry Manners, 8th Duke of Rutland. Lady Caroline was at the time, according to James Lees-Milne, diary 9th Oct 1949, pregnant, the father being Duff Cooper - her uncle by marriage. This pregnancy ended in a stillbirth. The Duffs subsequently adopted a son, Charles David Duff (b. 1950), who became a theatre historian.

A documentary screened on BBC Two Wales in 2005 (Faenol: Secrets Behind the Wall) featured Charles Duff discussing his childhood, the bisexuality of his adoptive parents, their marriage of convenience, and the details of his parentage. He did not inherit the estate, and when it was sold all the records were burnt, so compounding the mystery. In another interview for the BBC ("Wall Of Silence", BBC Wales website) Charles said of Vaynol: "It was a place of great conviviality and energy and joy." However, by the time Charles was in his teens, Sir Michael had come to believe that his second marriage and the adoption of his son had been grave errors, and according to Charles Duff, "he started to demonise both my mother and myself." Although appearances were maintained, neither could then do much right in Sir Michael's opinion. By this time the house and estate were also in decline. (Prior to the Second World War there had been 17 gardeners.)

== The Duff Estate ==
The Vaynol estate, in northern Wales, close to the Anglesey estate at Plas Newydd, passed out of Duff family hands, the last main portion including the demesne within the walls being sold off in 1984. This had come into the family via Mary Assheton-Smith, niece and heiress of the famous squire Assheton-Smith, the celebrated foxhunter.

Honorary titles
Preceded by Sir William Wynne-Finch	Lord Lieutenant of Caernarvonshire; 1960–1974	Position abolished
New post	Lord Lieutenant of Gwynedd; 1974–1980	Succeeded by The Marquess of Anglesey
Baronetage of the United Kingdom
Preceded by Sir Robert Duff	Baronet (of Vaynoll Park); 1914–1980	Extinct
