= Lady Caroline Paget =

English socialite and actress (1913–1973)

- Born: Alexandra Mary Cecilia Caroline Paget; 15 June 1913
- Died: 22 May 1973 (aged 59)
- Occupations: Socialite, actress
- Spouse: Sir Michael Duff, 3rd Baronet (m. 1949)
- Children: 1
- Parent(s): Charles Paget, 6th Marquess of Anglesey; Lady Victoria Manners

Lady Alexandra Mary Cecilia Caroline Paget (15 June 1913 – 22 May 1973) was an English socialite and actress.

== Early life and family ==
Lady Caroline was born Lady Alexandra Mary Cecilia Caroline Paget on 15 June 1913. She was the eldest child of Charles Paget, 6th Marquess of Anglesey, and his wife, the former Lady Victoria Manners. Lady Caroline's mother was the daughter of Henry Manners, 8th Duke of Rutland.

== Career ==
During the 1930s, she was a notable British socialite, and a minor actress. She was beloved of the artist Rex Whistler, who painted numerous portraits of her, including a startling nude, which is on display at Plas Newydd, (the ancestral home of the Marquess of Anglesey). Lady Caroline Paget was the unrequited love of Elizabeth Parrish Starr. There are several references to her in the published journals of Edith Olivier and The National Screen and Sound Archive of Wales has footage of short films featuring Caroline and her sister Elizabeth, as well as other material. Writer Maureen Emerson also provides considerable information about Paget & Starr her in her book 'Escape to Provence'.

== Personal life and death ==
On 14 July 1949, Lady Caroline married Sir Michael Duff, 3rd Baronet, becoming his second wife. Lady Caroline was at the time, according to James Lees-Milne, diary 9 October 1949, pregnant, the father being Duff Cooper - her uncle by marriage. This pregnancy ended in a stillbirth. The Duffs subsequently adopted a son, Charles David Duff (b. 1950), who became a theatre historian.

A documentary screened on BBC Two Wales in 2005 (Faenol: Secrets Behind the Wall) featured Charles Duff discussing his childhood, the bisexuality of his adoptive parents, their marriage of convenience, and the details of his parentage. He did not inherit the estate, and when it was sold all the records were burnt, so compounding the mystery. In another interview for the BBC ("Wall Of Silence", BBC Wales website) Charles said of Vaynol: "It was a place of great conviviality and energy and joy". However, by the time Charles was in his teens, Sir Michael had come to believe that his second marriage and the adoption of his son had been grave errors, and according to Charles Duff, "he started to demonise both my mother and myself". Although appearances were maintained, neither could then do much right in Sir Michael's opinion. By this time the house and estate were also in decline. (Prior to the Second World War there had been 17 gardeners.) Her first cousin once removed Henry Paget, 5th Marquess of Anglesey, was also assumed to be homosexual.

Lady Caroline Duff died on 22 May 1973, at the age of 59.
