= Christopher Simon Sykes =

British photographer, born 1948

Christopher Simon Sykes (born 23 July 1948) is an English writer, historian and photographer. He was born into the northern English landed gentry Sykes family of Sledmere House, the third son of Sir (Mark Tatton) Richard Tatton-Sykes, 7th Baronet of Sledmere. He is the grandson of Mark Sykes, who helped draw up the Sykes–Picot Agreement, and Lilian Chetwynd, the wife of Henry Paget, 5th Marquess of Anglesey. In addition to his authoring fourteen books, his work has appeared in many magazines. He has also written and presented Upper Crust, a six-part television series on country-house cookery for BBC Two. He is married, and has two children by his first wife.

== Publications ==
- The Visitors' Book: A Family Album. New York: Putnam. 1978. ISBN 978-0-399-12212-5.
- Black Sheep. Viking Press. 1982.
- Ancient English Houses: 1240–1612. London: Chatto and Windus. 1988. ISBN 978-0-7011-3176-0.
- The National Trust Country House Album. National Trust. 1989. ISBN 978-1-851-45201-9.
- Private Palaces: Life in the Great London Houses. Chatto & Windus. 1985. ISBN 978-0-701-13001-5.
- Great Houses of England and Wales. Laurence King. 1994. ISBN 978-1-856-69053-9. (with Hugh Montgomery-Massingberd)
- Great Houses of Scotland. Laurence King. 1997. ISBN 978-1-856-69106-2. (with Hugh Montgomery-Massingberd)
- Great Houses of Ireland. Laurence King. 1999. ISBN 978-1-856-69172-7. (with Hugh Montgomery-Massingberd)
- English Manor Houses. Laurence King. 2001. ISBN 978-1-856-69222-9. (with Hugh Montgomery-Massingberd)
- The Big House: The Story of a Country House and its Family. HarperCollins. 2004. ISBN 978-0-007-10710-0.
- David Hockney: The Biography, 1937–1975. New York: Nan A. Talese . 2012. ISBN 978-0-385-53144-3.
- David Hockney: The Biography, 1975–2012. New York: Doubleday. 2014. ISBN 978-0-385-53590-8.
- The Man Who Created the Middle East: A Story of Empire, Conflict and the Sykes–Picot Agreement. HarperCollins. 2018. ISBN 978-0-008-12192-1.
