= John Francis McLaren =

RAF officer

John Francis McLaren (19 June 1919 – 23 March 1953) was a Royal Air Force officer. He was the younger son of Henry McLaren, 2nd Baron Aberconway and Christabel MacNaghten.

== Career ==
Educated at Eton College, McLaren became an RAF squadron leader during World War II, first serving as a Mosquito pilot and later as a flight instructor. After the war, he became a barrister of the Inner Temple in 1946. He was made High Sheriff of Denbighshire in 1952, but died in 1953 aged 34.

== Family ==
On 3 April 1940, he married Lady Rose Mary Primrose Paget (1919–2005), a noted beauty and the daughter of Charles Paget, 6th Marquess of Anglesey. They had two daughters, six grandchildren and three great-grandchildren:

- Victoria Mary Caroline McLaren (23 May 1945) she married Jonathan Taylor on 4 October 1966. They have four daughters and one grandson:
  - Arabella Lucy Kirwan Taylor b. 1969
  - Lucinda Sophie Kirwan Taylor (1972)
  - Caroline Samantha Kirwan Taylor (1976) she married Alexander Simon Ramsay (grandson of 16th Earl of Dalhousie). They have one son.
  - Katharine Polly Kirwan Taylor (1979)
- Harriet Diana Christabel McLaren (18 January 1949) she married Hugh Geddes (grandson of Auckland Campbell Geddes, 1st Baron Geddes though his third son) on 27 January 1972. They have two sons and two grandchildren:
  - Luke John McLaren Geddes (22 March 1974)
  - Sam Duncan McLaren Geddes (29 August 1975) he married Mary C. Banker. They have two children:
    - John Geddes (29 November 2013)
    - Eva Rose Christabel Geddes (19 October 2015)

Honorary titles
Preceded by Ririd Myddelton	High Sheriff of Denbighshire; 1952	Succeeded by John Oliver Burton
