= Plas Newydd (Anglesey) =

Country house in Anglesey

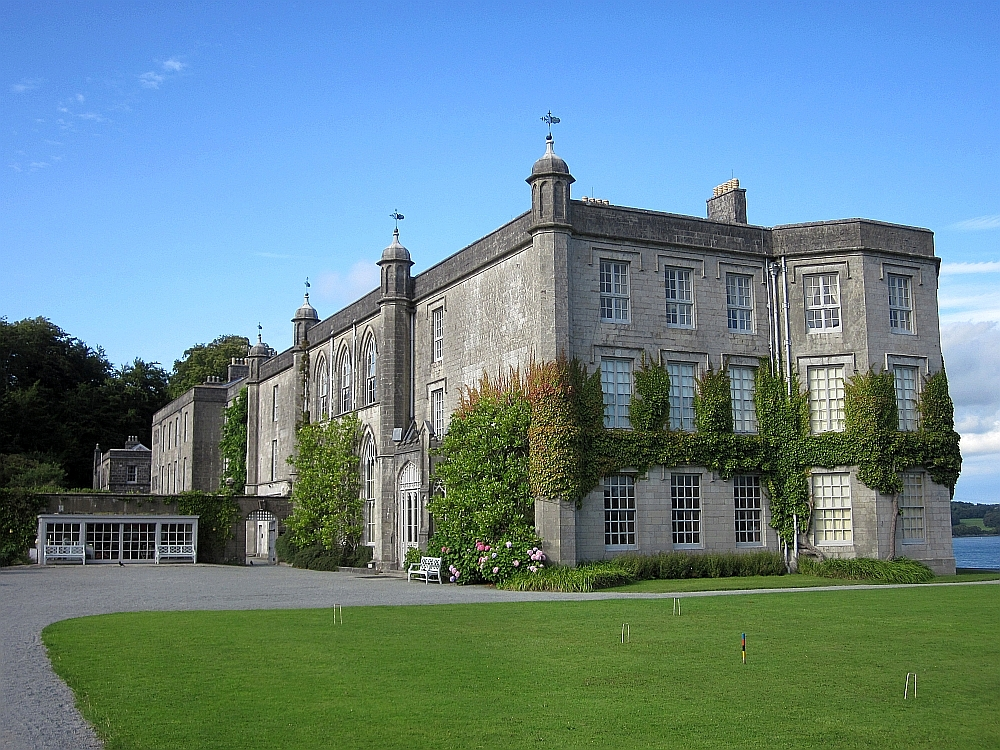

- Location within Wales
- 53.2026°N 4.216°W
- Type: House
- Location: Llanfairpwllgwyngyll, Anglesey

History
- Built: 14C-16C. Substantial additions from 1751
- Rebuilt: 1793

Site notes
- Architect(s): James Wyatt and Joseph Potter
- Architectural style: Neo-Classical with early Gothic
- Owner: National Trust

Listed Building – Grade I
- Official name: Plas Newydd
- Designated: 1968
- Reference no.: 5462

Cadw/ICOMOS Register of Parks and Gardens of Special Historic Interest in Wales
- Official name: Plas Newydd
- Type: Grade I
- Designated: 2002
- Reference no.: PGW (Gd) 33 (ANG)

Plas Newydd (Welsh for 'new mansion') is a country house set in gardens, parkland and surrounding woodland on the north bank of the Menai Strait, in Llanddaniel Fab, near Llanfairpwllgwyngyll, Anglesey, Wales. The current building has its origins in 1470, and evolved over the centuries to become one of Anglesey's principal residences. Owned successively by Griffiths, Baylys and Pagets, it became the country seat of the Marquesses of Anglesey, and the core of a large agricultural estate. The house and grounds, with views over the strait and Snowdonia, are open to the public, having been owned by the National Trust since 1976.

== History ==
From its earliest known residence in 1470, Plas Newydd passed by inheritance and marriage through more than 400 years of a family's increasing concentration of wealth, titles and estates until the ascendency of the 5th Marquess of Anglesey, whose profligate spending almost bankrupted the estate. The 7th Marquess of Anglesey presented it to the National Trust in 1976 so that the house and grounds could be opened to the public.

=== Origins ===
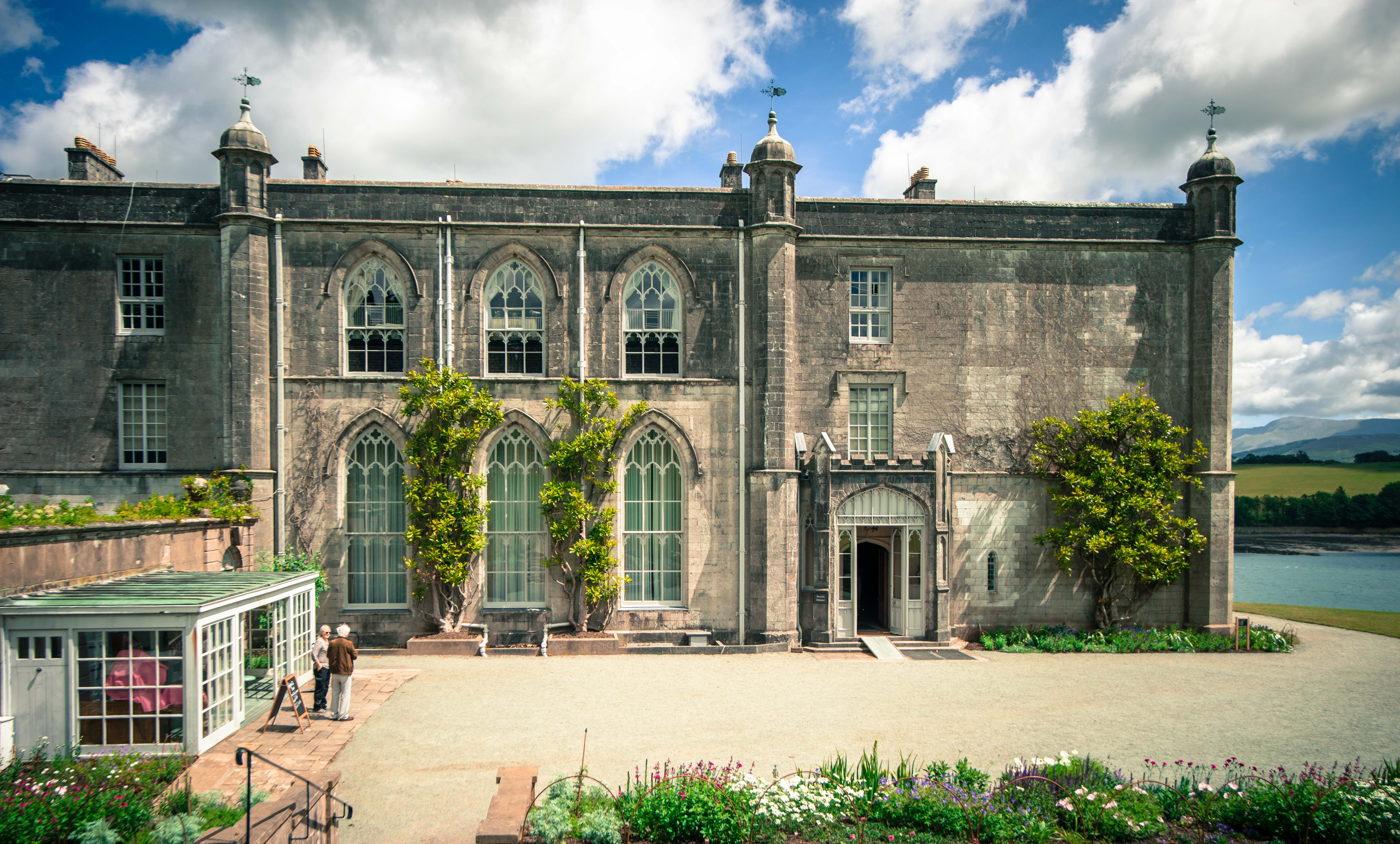
Plas Newydd, with the Menai Strait behind

The house site was first occupied in the 13th century and was known as Llwyn-y-Moel. By 1470 it belonged to the Griffith family, who also owned Penrhyn Castle near Bangor. Before the 15th century residence was built, the proprietor of the land also owned several more tenements in the surrounding area on Anglesey. It was first recorded as being owned by Meredydd Ddu in the 1300s. After being passed from father to son until the 1470s, the family of Gwilym ap Griffith acquired substantial Anglesey holdings from his marriage to Morfydd, daughter of Goronwy ap Tudur of Penmynydd, including Llwyn-y-Moel. Robert Griffith built the earliest parts of the current house in the early 16th century, creating a hall-house.

=== Bagnall and Bayly families ===
In 1533 Ellen Griffith married Nicholas Bagenal and they took possession of what was still known as Llwyn-y-Moel, and the property was sold or mortgaged to Henry Bagnall about 1575. Their granddaughter, Ann, married Lewis Bayly, Bishop of Bangor. It was Bishop Bayly who made the first major additions to the house and was the first to call it Plas Newydd (Welsh: New Mansion). The Baylys lived in Plas Newydd, along with other estates, particularly in Ireland, and Lewis's grandson, Edward Bayly, acquired an Irish baronetcy in 1730 when he was styled Baronet of Plas Newydd in the County of Anglesey and Mount Bagenall in the County of Down. Lewis's great-grandson, Sir Nicholas Bayly, 2nd Baronet, married Caroline Paget in 1737 and became Lord Lieutenant of Anglesey in 1761, a position his family would fill for the next 100 years. Their son, Henry, was to be the beneficiary of substantial inheritances from both sides of the family.

=== Bayly to Paget ===
Born in 1744 as Henry Bayly, he succeeded, through his mother, to the title and estates of the Barony of Paget in 1769, on the death of the 2nd Earl of Uxbridge, who was also the 8th Baron Paget, distant cousin on his mother's side. As 9th Baron Paget, Henry Bayly took possession of the Beaudesert estates in Staffordshire, and changed his surname to Paget. (Unlike the Barony, the Earldom could not pass through the female line, so the Earldom of Uxbridge became extinct.) In 1782, his father died, which added "3rd Baronet" to his titles, and Plas Newydd to his estates. He also took over as Lord Lieutenant of Anglesey. In 1784, he was created Earl of Uxbridge as a second creation of that Earldom. Plas Newydd had been extended in the middle of the 18th century, with an octagonal tower at the south-east corner, but under Henry's care there were substantial additions and rebuilding throughout the estate, especially with the appointment of James Wyatt and Joseph Potter as architects.

=== Earls of Uxbridge to Marquesses of Anglesey ===
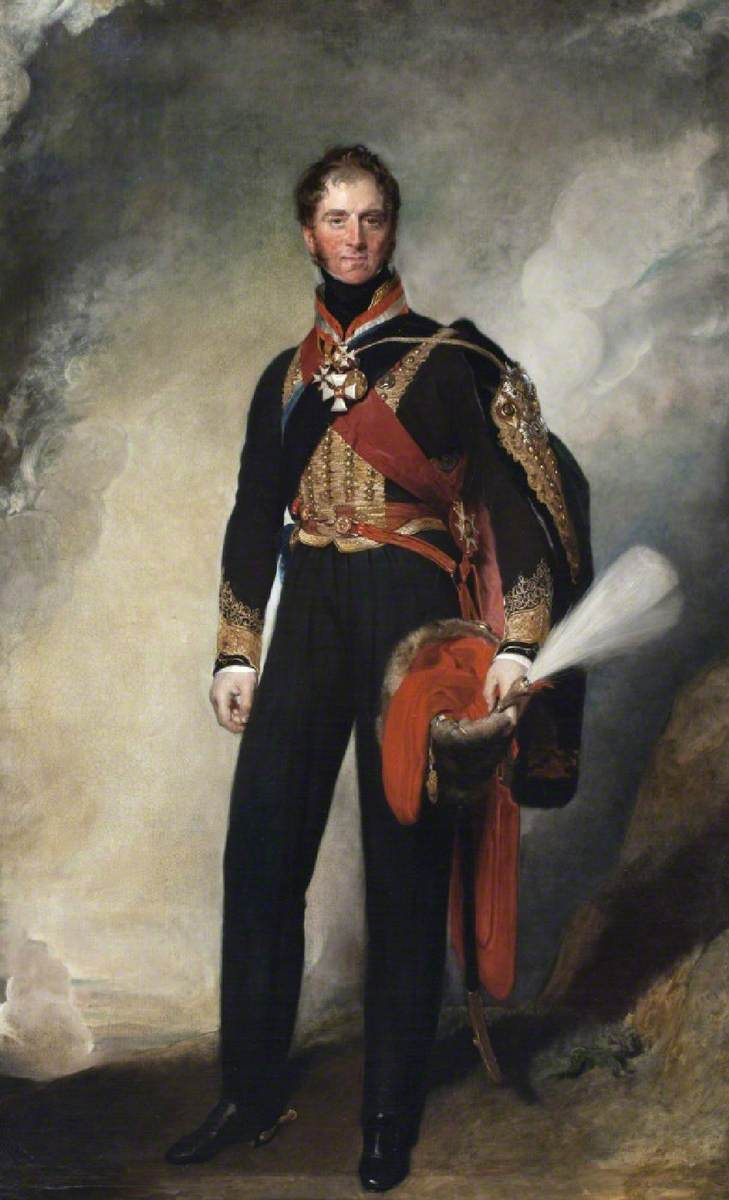
Portrait of Lord Uxbridge by Thomas Lawrence, 1817

Plas Newydd itself was greatly altered in the 18th century by James Wyatt, who refaced it, blended the towers into the building front, and made it into substantially the building that stands today. He also had constructed the large Gothic style stable block which is now part of the Conway Centre, and various lodges and gateways were also constructed. In 1812 Henry died, and the estate passed to his son Henry William Paget, who became the 2nd Earl of Uxbridge. Henry William had raised a regiment of volunteers in the 1790s, was commissioned into the Army in 1795, and distinguished himself in numerous engagements and campaigns across Europe. By 1802 he was a major-general, and in 1815 was appointed cavalry commander, leading a spectacular charge of the British heavy cavalry at the Battle of Waterloo. In recognition of his heroism he was created the first Marquess of Anglesey, although he lost a leg from one of the last cannon shots of the day. The following year the 27 metre column was raised in his honour, sited to the north of Plas Newydd.

At the end of the 19th century Henry Paget, 5th Marquess of Anglesey, inherited the family seat, which he renamed Anglesey Castle. Renowned for his lavish spending and flamboyant lifestyle, Lord Anglesey converted the family chapel inside the house into a performance space called the Gaiety Theatre. Plays were put on regularly, with "the Dancing Marquess" often taking the lead role himself. The 5th Marquess's extravagant spending drained the family fortune, and after his death in 1905, Charles Paget, 6th Marquess of Anglesey, began to sell off assets to help restore the solvency of the family. The family also sold off their main home at Beaudesert and their London house, and moved into Plas Newydd permanently. The 6th Marquess made the final big changes to the house by removing the crenellations from the roof, disposing of the theatre, knocking three servants' rooms together to make the dining room and covering over a courtyard to provide a roof for the servants. In the 1930s the artist Rex Whistler was a regular visitor to Plas Newydd. He painted numerous portraits of Lady Caroline Paget, and in 1936-38 painted the largest canvas painting in the UK. It is a trompe-l'œil seascape painting that fills a whole wall of the dining room with an imagined scene of Italianate churches, castles, Snowdonian mountains and a complete harbour wall, with tricks of perspective that mean the scenes appear to change when seen from different parts of the room.

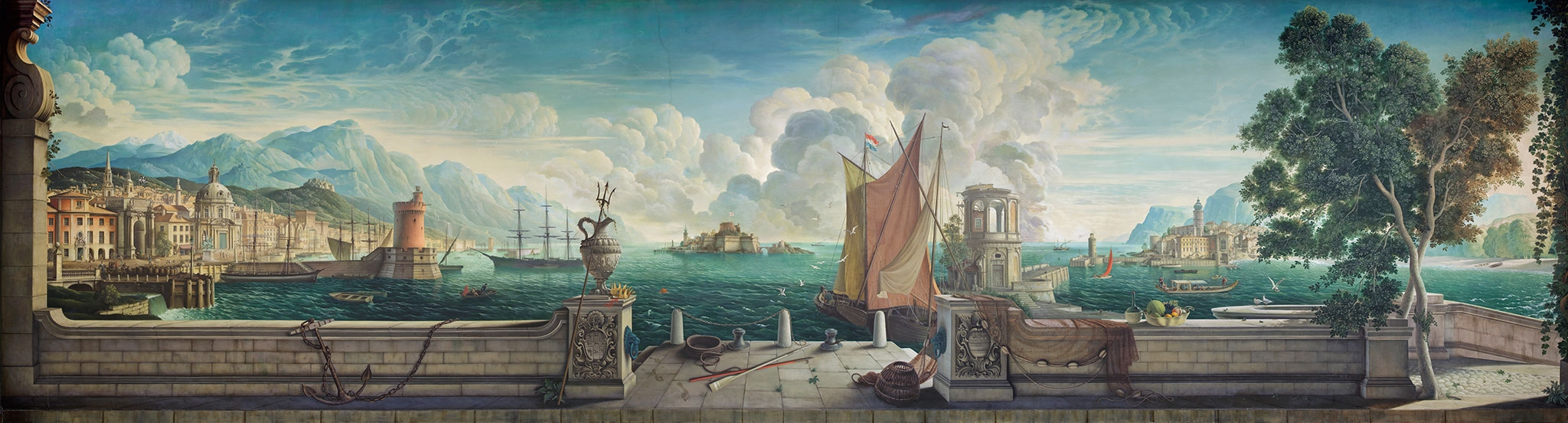
Rex Whistler's "Capriccio" painting which fills the length of the Dining Room

The house has been owned by the National Trust since 1976.

== HMS Conway ==
In 1949 the training ship HMS Conway was moored in the Menai Strait near Plas Newydd. The ship was supported from the small dock in the grounds of the estate. The ship was wrecked after running aground in 1953, and the school built temporary facilities in the grounds near the current reception centre. These were used for teaching and housing the senior cadets. The younger cadets were accommodated in the eastern wing of the house. The former stables building was used for teacher accommodation, classrooms and a laboratory. These arrangements continued until 1963 when the entire school moved into a new purpose-built building in the grounds of the estate. The school was closed in 1974 but the buildings and the grounds were subsequently acquired by Cheshire County Council. It was renamed the Conway Centre and is now managed by a stand-alone organisation, Quality Learning Partners, with the support of Cheshire West and Chester Council, and is used as an outdoor adventure centre.

== Points of interest ==
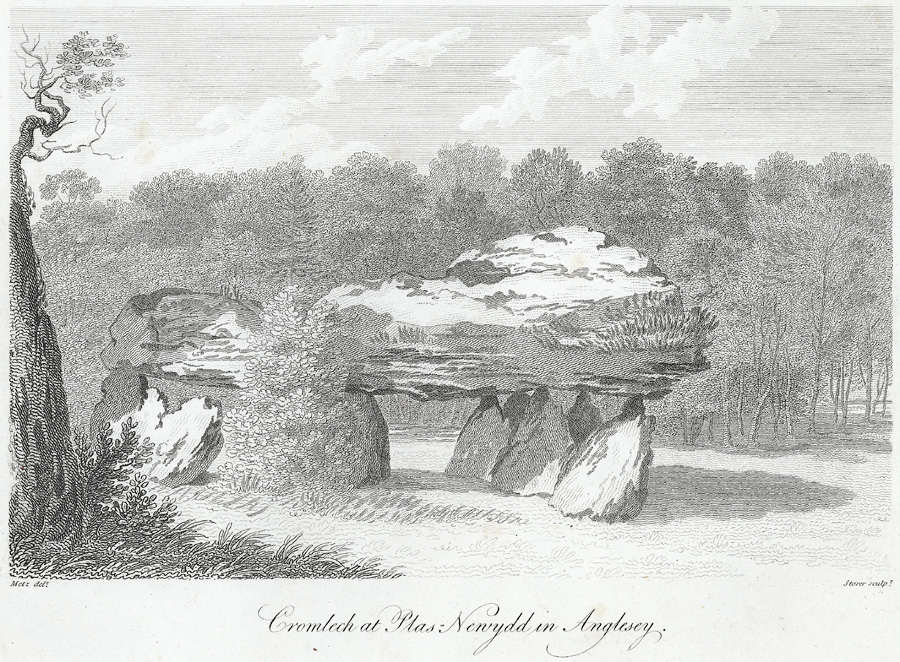
Cromlech at Plas Newydd, black and white print on engraving, 1799

The house contains Rex Whistler's largest painting, measuring 58 by 12 feet (17.7 by 3.7 m).

The 7th Marquess of Anglesey retained rooms at the house until his death in July 2013. Lady Rose McLaren grew up at the house along with the 7th Marquess - her brother. The 8th Marquess no longer lives at the house.

At the house there is also a military museum which contains campaign relics belonging to the 1st Marquess of Anglesey, mementos of the Battle of Waterloo and the Anglesey Leg.

== Parkland and gardens ==
The house is set within an outstanding park, landscaped around 1800. The design included input from Humphry Repton, and his trademark Red Book of before and after landscape views is still extant. With its extensive waterside site, superb location, and views of the Menai Strait and Snowdonia, it is the only Anglesey site to be classed as Grade I in the Cadw/ICOMOS Register of Parks and Gardens of Special Historic Interest in Wales. It is within the Anglesey Area of Outstanding Natural Beauty and is within an environmentally sensitive area.

In January 2010, the grounds became the first part of North Wales to be included in Google Street View, thanks to a scheme to include National Trust properties by using the Google Trike which scanned the paths at Plas Newydd in August 2009, where vehicular access is limited.

== Scheduled monuments ==
There are two prehistoric scheduled monuments on the site. The two monuments formed a single entry in the Ancient Monuments Protection Act 1882, and so, along with two other Welsh monuments, were among the first to receive legal protection.

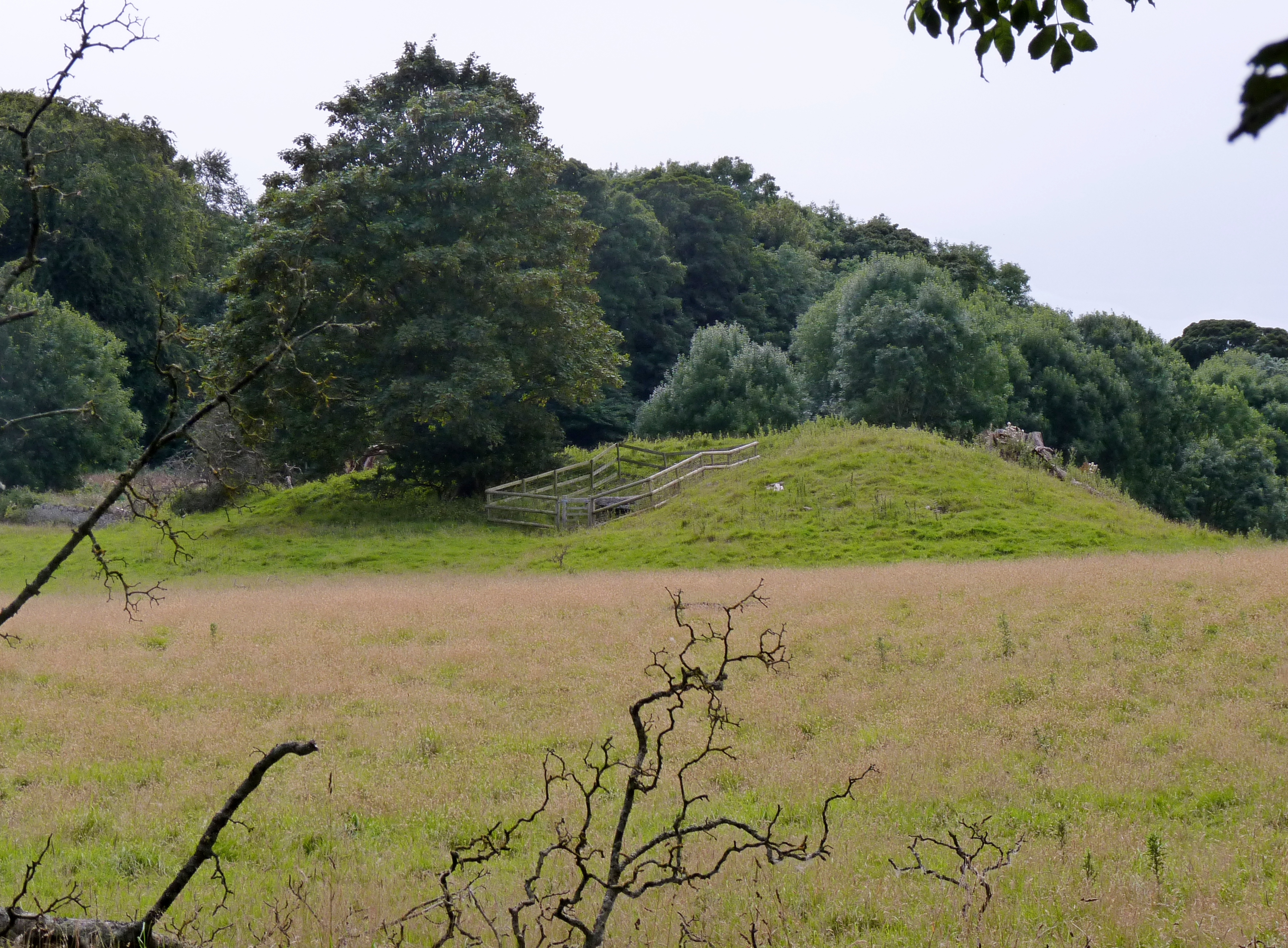
Bryn-yr-Hen-Bobl Burial Chamber, south of Plas Newydd

Plas Newydd Burial Chambers are two adjoining stone chambers of a Neolithic burial cairn or cromlech. They stand on private lawns in front of the house.

Bryn-yr-Hen-Bobl Burial Chamber ("Hill of the old people") is a substantial mound with a stone chamber, to the south of the parkland. Bones were found here in 1754. It was excavated by Wilfrid James Hemp in 1929–35, and Neolithic pottery appeared to lie under and in front of the mound, suggesting a settlement predating its use as a burial site. The chamber was given a doorway following the dig, but is not accessible to the public. It is visible from the southern edge of 'Garden Wood'.

== Listed buildings on Plas Newydd Estate ==
In addition to the Grade I listed main house, Plas Newydd had a large estate covering 3,848 hectares (9,510 acres) including outlying properties. The main estate lands stretched from the Grand Lodge in the north to Llanedwen in the south, taking in further listed buildings and structures in the estate grounds.

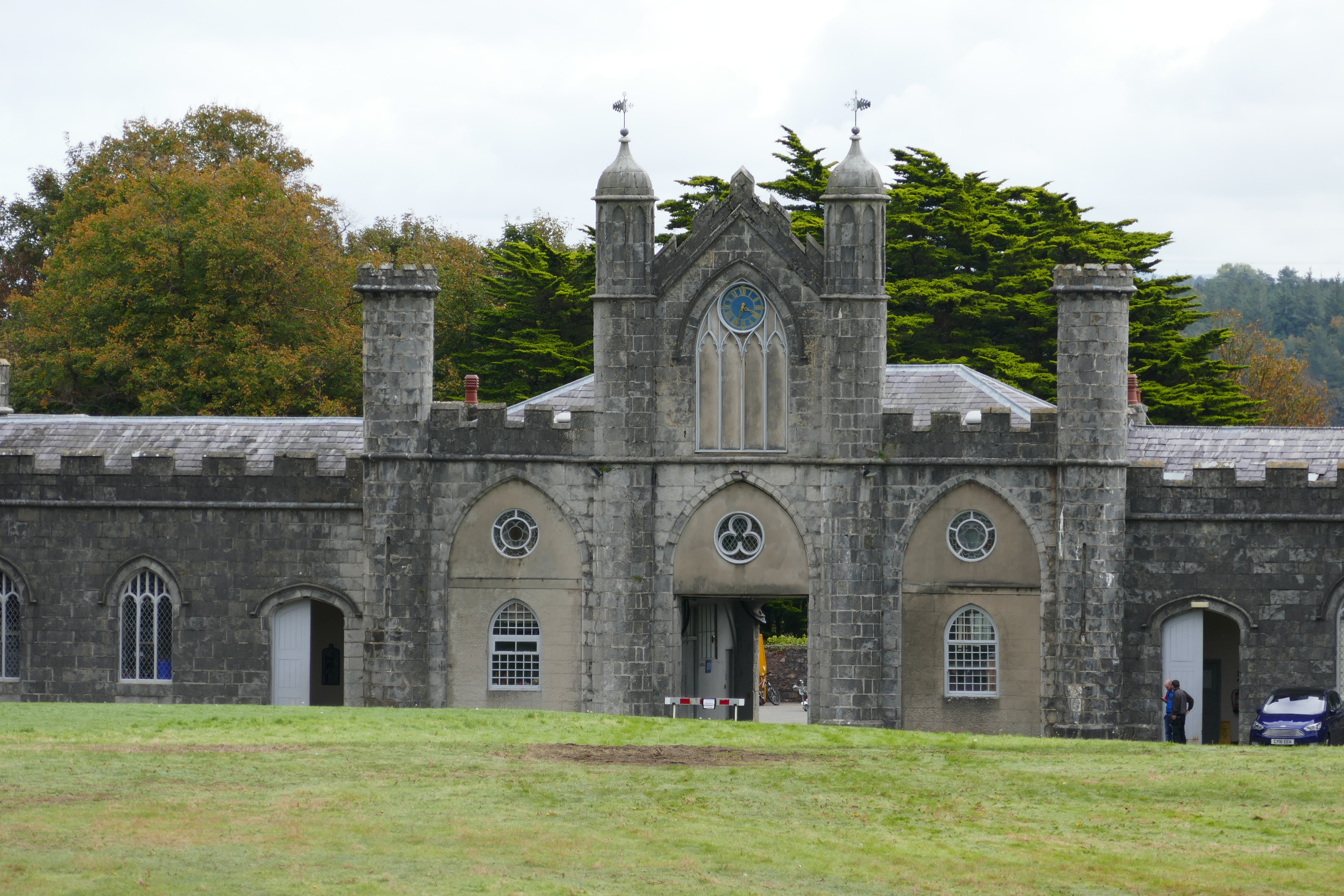
Former stables, now part of the Conway Centre

=== North of the House ===
Entrance archways, at Grand Lodge
Grade II listed 1805 stone arches with octagonal turrets, designed by Joseph Potter as part of a major rebuild of the 1st Marquess' park and estate buildings. It stands at the extreme north end of the estate, leading to the grand drive which ran 1 mile (1.6 km) across the park to Plas Newydd house.
Grand Lodge of Plas Newydd
Grade II listed mid-19th century lodge in a Gothic style matching the earlier entrance arches. (A matching lodge on the old A5 was built by Lord Clarence Paget, 4th son of the 1st Marquess, for his house, Plas Llanfair, which later became the Training Ship Indefatigable, a lower ranks counterpart to HMS Conway, the Navy officer training facility at Plas Newydd.)
Victoria Cottages
Grade II listed, built in 1832 on Brynsiencyn Road as a school which merged with the Plas Newydd Charity School in 1851. By 1872 the National School at Llanfairpwll meant it was no longer needed, and it was converted into estate workers' cottages.
Tyddyn Pwyth
Grade II listed farmhouse in a longhouse plan, which fronted onto Brynsiencyn Road. In the mid-19th century it was converted into a row of three estate workers' cottages.
Stables of Plas Newydd
Grade II listed stable block north of the main house, designed by Wyatt and Potter and completed by 1800 to accommodate two carriages and 14 horses. It is now part of the Conway Centre and which also houses the heat-pump used to heat the main house.
Druid Lodge
Grade II listed gamekeeper's cottage reworked in an Arts and Crafts style in 1914 and used as a laundry for the main house.

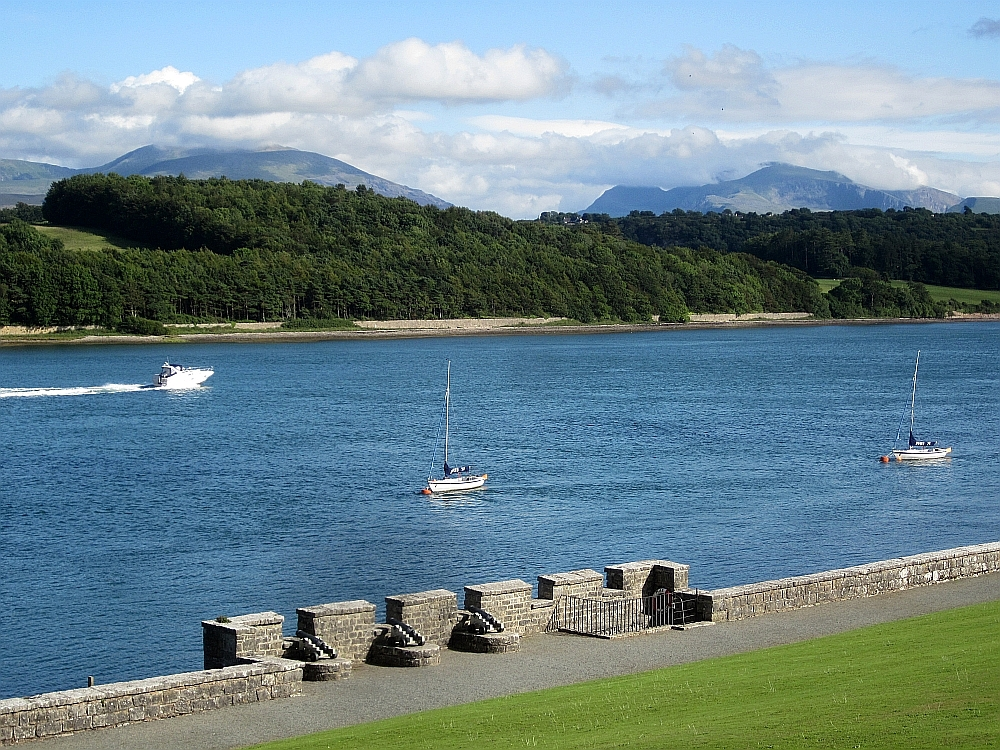
Plas Newydd Sea wall and Carronades

=== East of the House ===
Sea Wall and harbour facing the Menai Strait

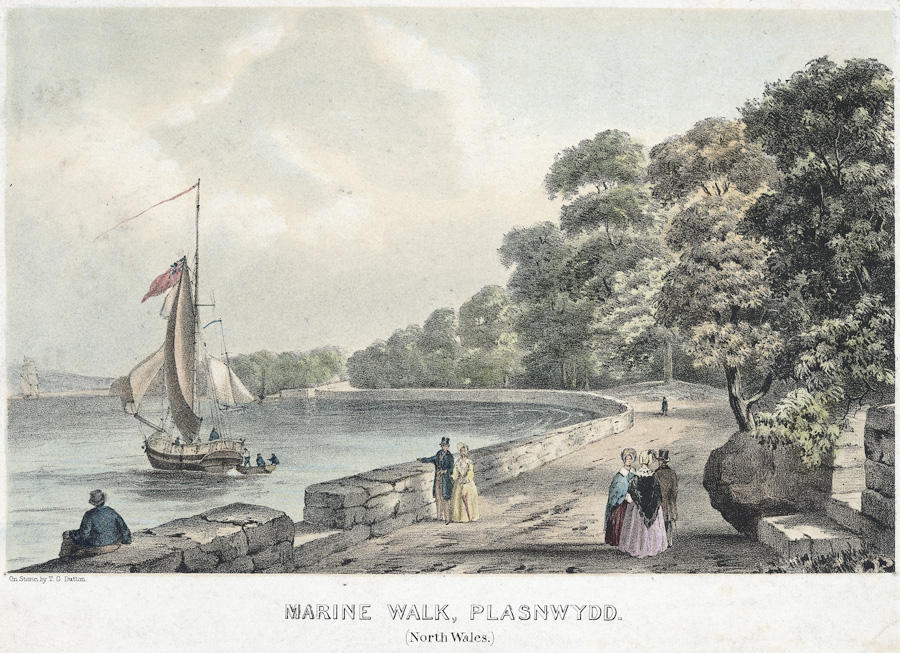
Marine walk, c.1840, by Thomas Goldsworthy Dutton

Grade II listed retaining wall built between 1796 and 1819, probably designed by Wyatt and Potter for Lord Uxbridge. Although always an ornamental feature, it sets a distinctly military tone to the sea wall. The five cannons ('trunnion' carronades) date from around 1830–45, and are from Fort Belan, at the southeastern tip of the Menai. Thomas John Wynn, 5th Baron Newborough gave them as a wedding present to Lord and Lady Anglesey in 1948.

Boathouse
Grade II listed boathouse, built shortly after the sea wall, in 1817 to 1822, alongside the harbour. It originally had five doorways at the front, three of which are now windows. It is now used by the Conway Centre.

=== West of the House ===
Old Dairy of Plas Newydd
Grade II listed stone-faced dairy buildings, built either as part of the early 19th century works designed by Potter or in the improvements in the late 19th century. A central milking parlour, with wings creating three sides of a courtyard, now National Trust tea rooms, shop, and visitor facilities.
West Lodge
Grade II listed two-storey stone lodge with a large double-height bay window facing the north-west access drive (now the drive to the Conway Centre). It was built in 1884 to a design by R Giles of Derby.

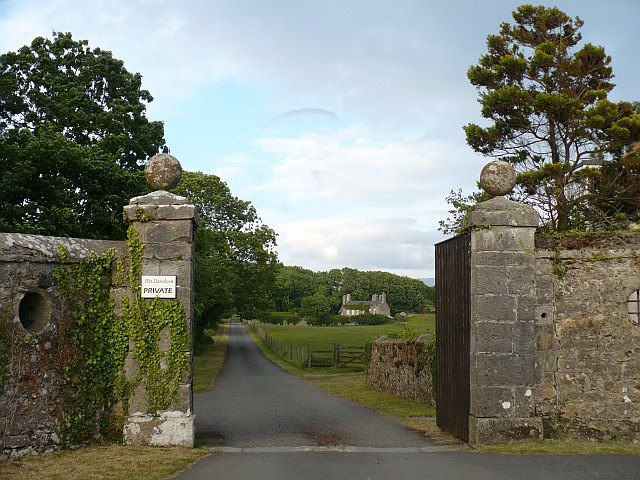
Entrance to Plas Llanedwen

=== Llanedwen, south of the House ===
Parts of the settlement of Llanedwen, including the church, lie within the parkland of Plas Newydd. Home Farm, Plas Llanedwen and the Church have two entrance gateways and lodge buildings, off the road that forms the estate's south-western boundary.

Plas Llanedwen
Grade II listed 17th century house, substantially extended during the 18th and early 19th centuries, and with battlemented parapets. It was described in a tourist guide of 1846 by Edward Parry as "the prettiest house on the island"; Princess Victoria had been a regular visitor. The house may be where Morus Gruffydd lived in the mid-16th century, and thus be an original focus of the estate.
Church of St. Edwen
Grade II listed church, an ancient church site, completely rebuilt in 1856 to a design by the Bangor architect Henry Kennedy by the 2nd Marquess, two years after he succeeded to the title.
Llanedwen Church Lodge
one of a pair of Grade II listed Arts and Crafts style lodges, built in 1914 during the time of the 6th Marquess, but before he made Plas Newydd his main residence in 1920.
Church Lodge entrance walls and gate piers
Grade II listed wall and gateway, built in 1914, at the same time as the lodge.
Home Farm
Grade II listed farm buildings close to Plas Llanedwen, forming three sides of a courtyard. Built in around 1804 to a design by Joseph Potter, it replaced an earlier home farm that had been much nearer the main house, and was moved on the advice of Humphry Repton.
Farm Lodge
Grade II listed Arts and Crafts style lodge near the entrance to the Home Farm, and built in 1914 for estate workers.
Farm Lodge entrance walls and gate piers
Grade II listed wall and gateway, built in 1914, providing access to both Plas Llanedwen and Home Farm. The lodge and gates match the Church lodge and gates, further down the road, with stone pillars capped by large stone balls.
Walls of square enclosed garden
Very large rectangular enclosed garden
Apple House
Three Grade II listed farm stores, adjoining the garden features close to Home Farm. They were all built in the early 19th century, at the same time as Home Farm was moved to this part of the estate. The larger walled garden grew vegetables, with the adjoining walled orchard for fruit, which was stored in the apple house. Covering a total of 4.5 acres (1.8 ha), they were a key productive part of the estate, and were a significant expansion from the earlier walled garden near the stable block at the other end of the park.

== Heat source ==
In 2014, the National Trust invested £600,000 in a marine source heat pump to provide heating for the house. At 300 kilowatts, the pump is the biggest in Britain. Its oil-fired boiler made the mansion the most polluting and biggest oil consumer of the National Trust's properties; the renovation is expected to save around £40,000 a year in operating costs. Plas Newydd is one of five properties in a pilot experiment; if they succeed, the National Trust will invest in 43 more renewable energy plans. The pilot programme includes: biomass in Croft Castle in Herefordshire, a woodchip boiler in Ickworth in Suffolk, and hydroelectric projects in Hafod y Porth near Craflwyn in Snowdonia, and at Stickle Ghyll in the Lake District.

== Gallery ==
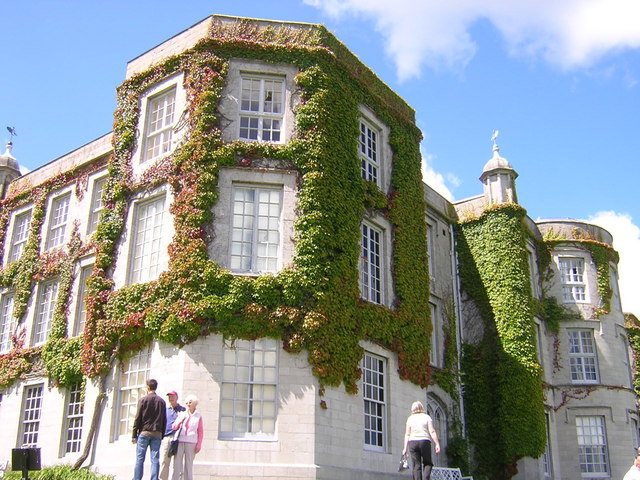

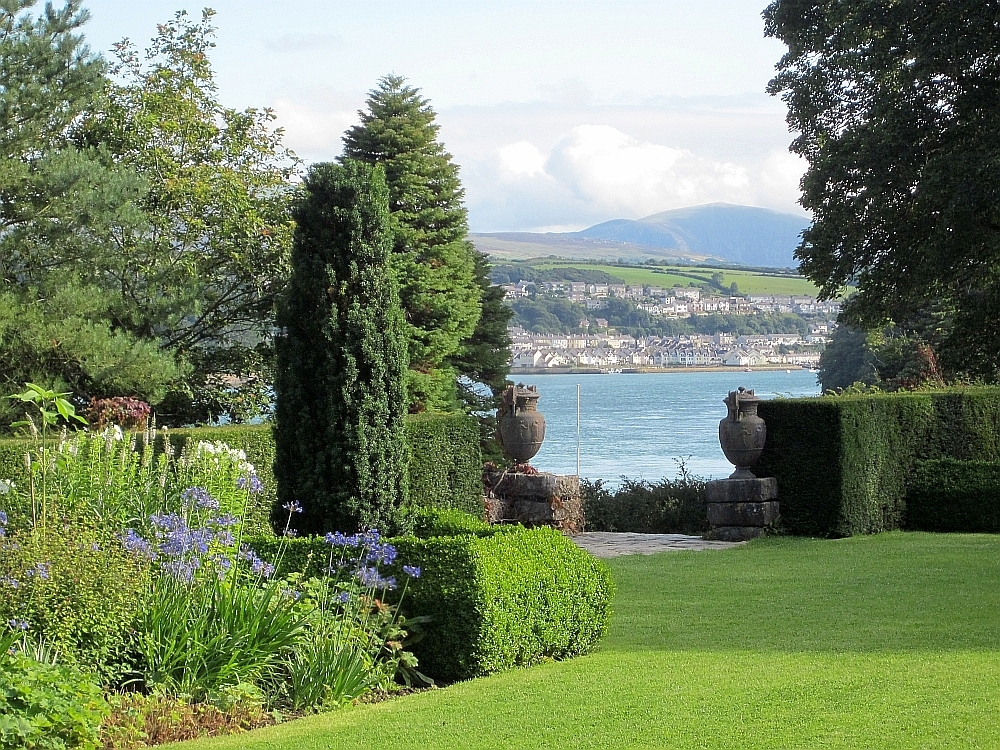

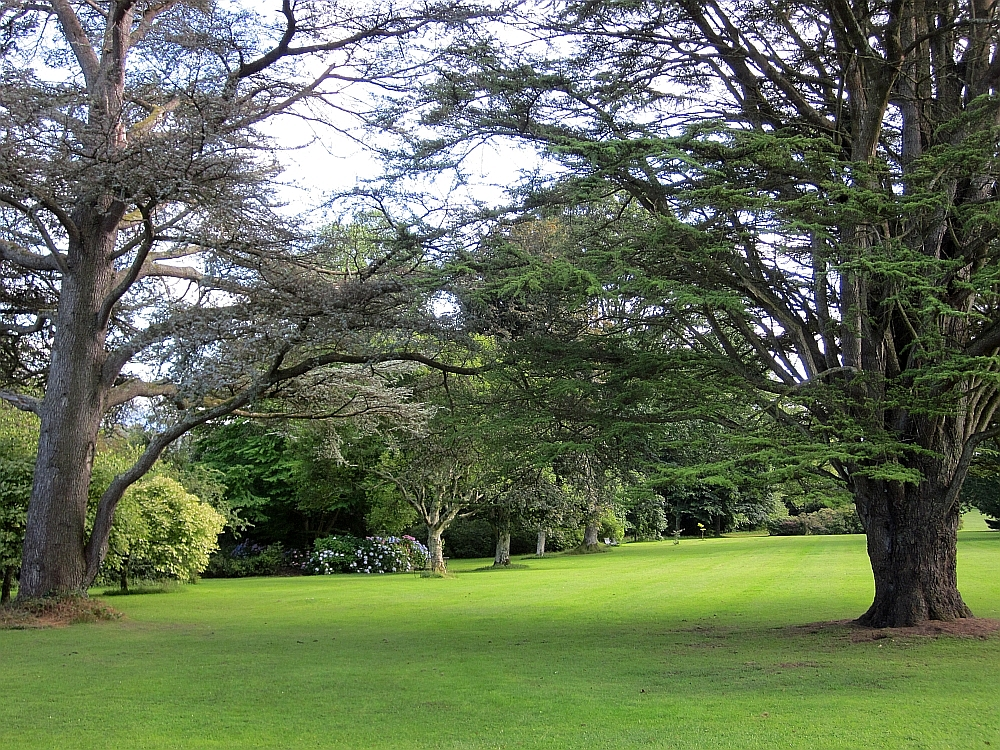

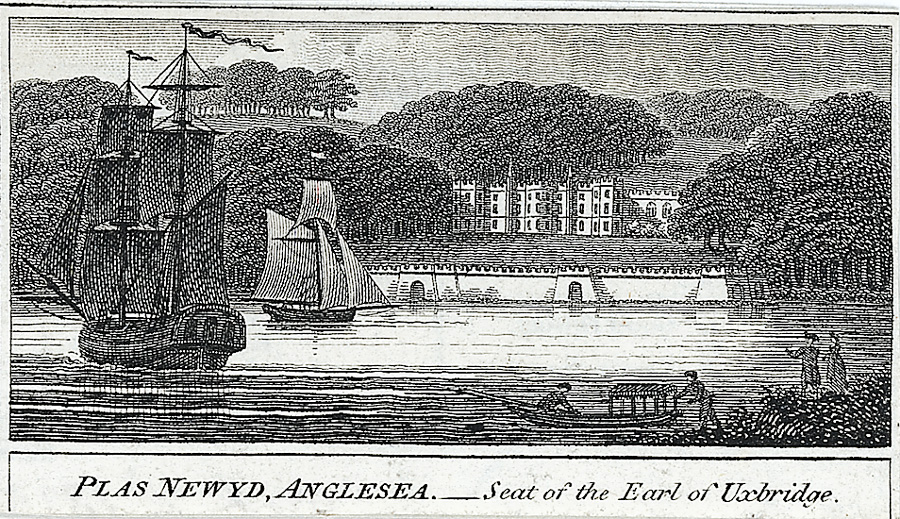

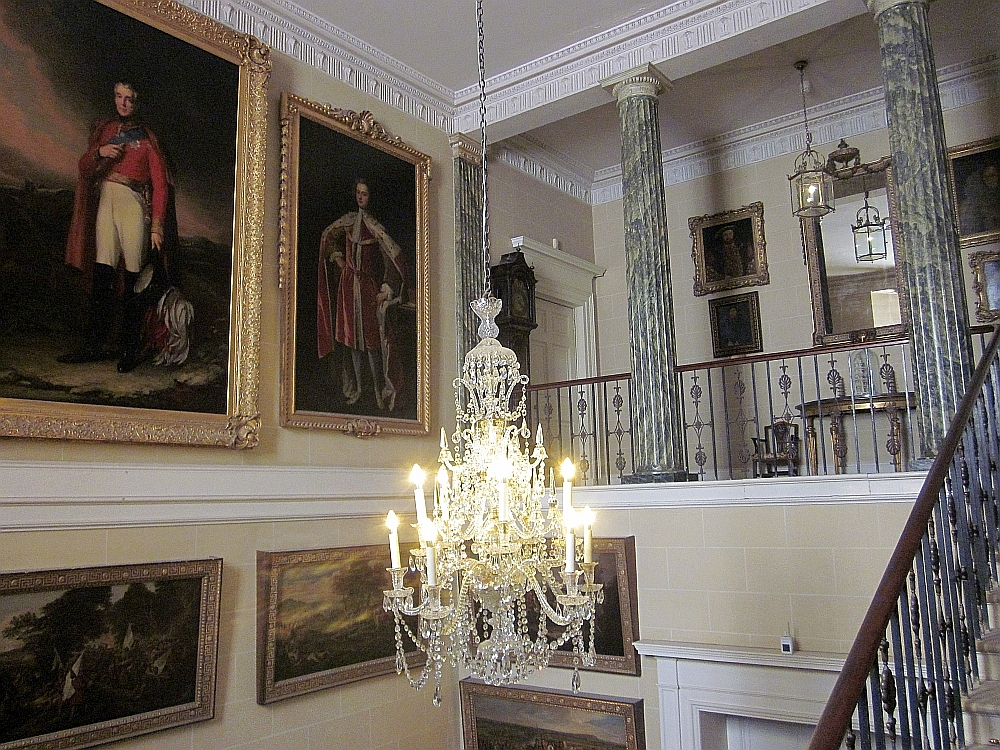

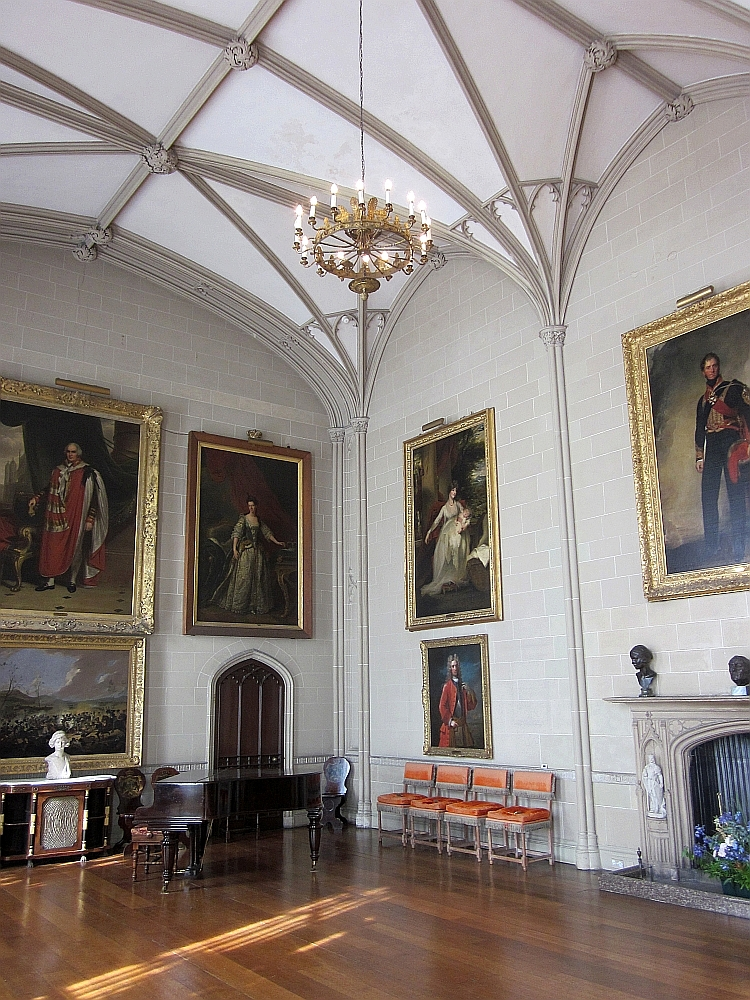

== See also ==
- List of National Trust properties in Wales
- Grade I listed buildings in Anglesey
- List of Scheduled Monuments in Anglesey
- Treasure Houses of Britain (1985 TV series)
