= Henry Paget, 7th Marquess of Anglesey =

British peer, soldier, historian and conservationist

The Most Honourable The Marquess of Anglesey DL FSA FRHistS FRSL
- Henry Paget, 7th Marquess of Anglesey in 1961
- Born: George Charles Henry Victor Paget; 8 October 1922; London, England
- Died: 13 July 2013 (aged 90); Llanddaniel Fab, Wales
- Education: Eton College
- Title: Marquess of Anglesey
- Term: 21 February 1947 – 13 July 2013
- Spouse: Shirley Morgan (m. 1948)
- Children: 5, including Charles Paget, 8th Marquess of Anglesey
- Parents: Charles Paget, 6th Marquess of Anglesey (father); Marjorie Paget, Marchioness of Anglesey (mother)

George Charles Henry Victor Paget, 7th Marquess of Anglesey, DL, FSA, FRHistS, FRSL (8 October 1922 – 13 July 2013), styled Earl of Uxbridge until 1947, was a British peer and a military historian.

== Background ==
Henry Paget was born in London, the son of Charles Paget, 6th Marquess of Anglesey and Lady Victoria Manners, the eldest daughter of the 8th Duke of Rutland, and was baptised with George V and Mary of Teck as his godparents. He was the brother of Lady Rose McLaren and the nephew of Lady Diana Cooper. He had a twin sister, Katharine.

He was educated at Wixenford School and Eton College.

Along with his wife, he attended the Coronation of Elizabeth II in 1953. At the time of his death in 2013 it was believed they were the only living married couple apart from Elizabeth II and Prince Philip to have attended the Coronation.

He used the courtesy title of Earl of Uxbridge until he succeeded to the marquessate in 1947.

== Work ==
He gained the rank of major in the Royal Horse Guards (Blues) and fought in the Second World War. Postwar he served as lieutenant colonel and Commandant of the Anglesey and Carnarvonshire Army Cadet Force 1948–50, and as a captain in 635th (Royal Welch) Light Anti-Aircraft Regiment, Royal Artillery, in the Territorial Army 1950–52. He held the office of Deputy Lieutenant of Anglesey in 1960, Vice-Lieutenant of Anglesey between 1960 and 1983 and Lord Lieutenant of Gwynedd between 1983 and 1989.

Lord Anglesey wrote the books The Capel Letters 1814–1817 (1955), consisting of the edited correspondence between the first Marquess's sister in England and his nieces; One Leg: The Life and Letters of 1st Marquess of Anglesey (1961), a biography of his ancestor; Sergeant Pearman's Memoirs (1968); and A History of the British Cavalry 1816–1919, published in eight volumes between 1973 and 1997. The last has been described as "the definitive history" of this branch of the army.

He was vice-president of the Society for Army Historical Research and a Member of the Council of the National Army Museum. He was Hon. President of the Crimean War Research Society. He was awarded an Honorary D.Litt by the University of Wales in 1984, and the Royal United Services Institute for Defence Studies awarded him the Chesney Gold Medal for his contribution to military history in 1996. He chaired the Historic Buildings Council for Wales (1977–1992) and was the founding President of the Friends of Friendless Churches (1966–1984). He served as a vice-chairman of the National Trust (1975–1985) and was a President of the National Museum of Wales (1962–1968). He was a member of the Royal Fine Art Commission (1965–1971) and a Trustee both of the National Portrait Gallery (1979–1991) and of the National Heritage Memorial Fund (1980–1992).

== Family ==
Lord Anglesey married Elizabeth Shirley Vaughan Morgan, daughter of the playwright and novelist Charles Langbridge Morgan, on 16 October 1948 and they had five children:

- Lady Henrietta Charlotte Eiluned Paget (b. 1949)
- Charles Alexander Vaughan Paget, 8th Marquess of Anglesey (b. 1950)
- Lady Elizabeth Sophia Rhiannon Paget (b. 1954)
- Lord Rupert Edward Llewellyn Paget (b. 1957)
- Lady Amelia Myfanwy Polly Paget (b. 1963)

He gave his Anglesey home, Plas Newydd, to the National Trust in 1976, although he and his wife continued to live in a suite on the upper floor; with 169 acres of the surrounding estate. The house has been open to the public since 1 July of that year.

Lord Anglesey died at home, aged 90, on 13 July 2013. His funeral was arranged as a private family cremation, followed by a private committal service at St Edwen's Church, Llanedwen. On 14 June 2014, a public memorial service was held for him in Bangor Cathedral.

== Style and titles ==
Major The Most Honourable George Charles Henry Victor Paget, 7th Marquess of Anglesey, 8th Earl of Uxbridge, 16th Baron Paget, 10th Baron Burton, DL FSA FRHistS FRSL.

== Ancestry ==
Ancestors of Henry Paget, 7th Marquess of Anglesey

16. Henry Paget, 1st Marquess of Anglesey
8. Henry Paget, 2nd Marquess of Anglesey
17. Lady Caroline Villiers
4. Lord Alexander Paget
18. Hon. Sir Charles Bagot
9. Henrietta Bagot
19. Lady Mary Wellesley-Pole
2. Charles Paget, 6th Marquess of Anglesey
20. Stapleton Cotton, 1st Viscount Combermere
10. Wellington Stapleton-Cotton, 2nd Viscount Combermere
21. Caroline Greville
5. Hon. Hester Stapleton-Cotton
22. Sir George Sitwell, 2nd Baronet
11. Susan Sitwell
23. Susan Tait
1. Henry Paget, 7th Marquess of Anglesey
24. John Manners, 5th Duke of Rutland
12. John Manners, 7th Duke of Rutland
25. Lady Elizabeth Howard
6. Henry Manners, 8th Duke of Rutland
26. George Marlay
13. Catherine Marlay
27. Lady Catherine Butler
3. Lady Victoria Marjorie Manners
28. James Lindsay, 24th Earl of Crawford
14. Hon. Charles Lindsay
29. Hon. Maria Pennington
7. Violet Lindsay
30. Montague Browne
15. Emilia Browne
31. Hon. Catherine de Montmorency

Honorary titles
Unknown	Lord Lieutenant of Gwynedd; 1983–1989	Succeeded by Meuric Rees
Peerage of the United Kingdom
Preceded by Charles Paget	Marquess of Anglesey; 1947 – 2013	Succeeded by Charles Alexander Vaughan Paget
