= Beaudesert, Cannock Chase =

Estate and stately home on the southern edge of Cannock Chase in Staffordshire

Coordinates: 52°43′3″N 1°55′12″W

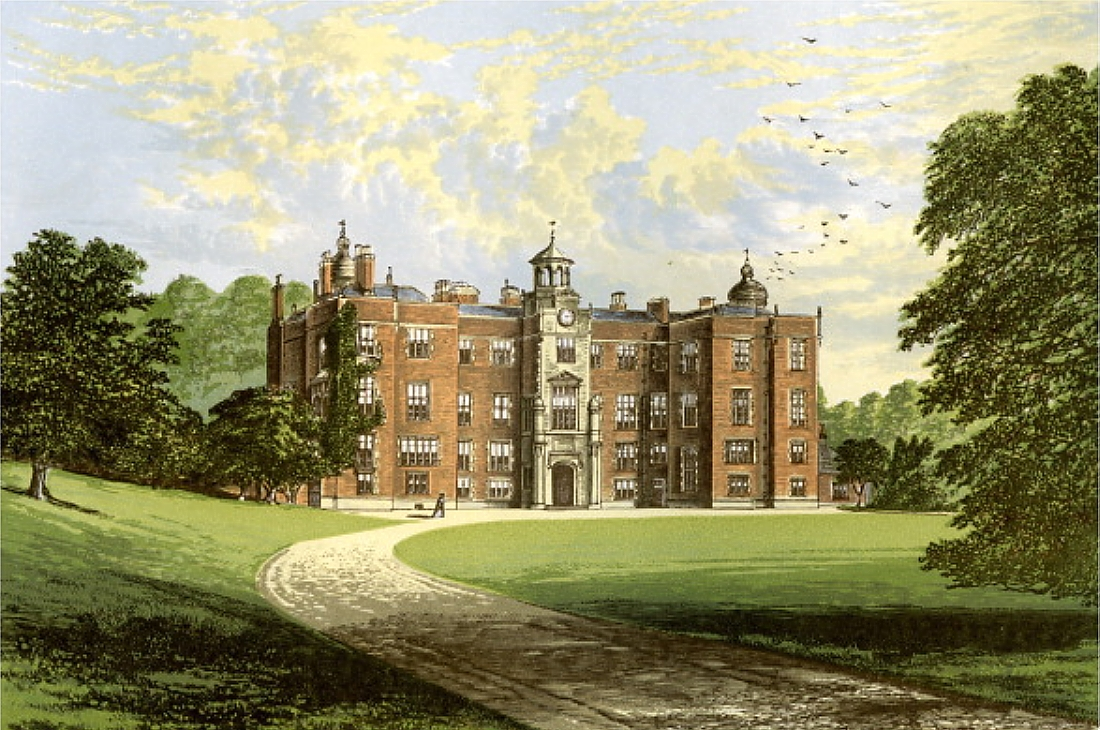
Beaudesert circa 1880

Beaudesert was an estate and stately home on the southern edge of Cannock Chase in Staffordshire. It was one of the family seats of the Paget family, the Marquesses of Anglesey. The estate was obtained by William Paget, 1st Baron Paget in 1546; the family's other main seat is at Plas Newydd.

The estate was broken up by the 6th Marquess of Anglesey due to financial difficulties; as a result the furniture was sold off and the fabric of the hall and stables went to auction. Some of the furnishings of the house, including oak panelling and the Waterloo Staircase were taken to Carrick Hill in Adelaide, South Australia. Demolition began in 1935; however, it was never completed and some ruins remain standing.

Today some of the former estate land is used as a Scout and Guide camp and a local wildlife trust and new buildings are used for residential courses. The Grand Lodge built in 1814 still stands at the entrance on Horsey Lane, east of the ruins.

== History ==
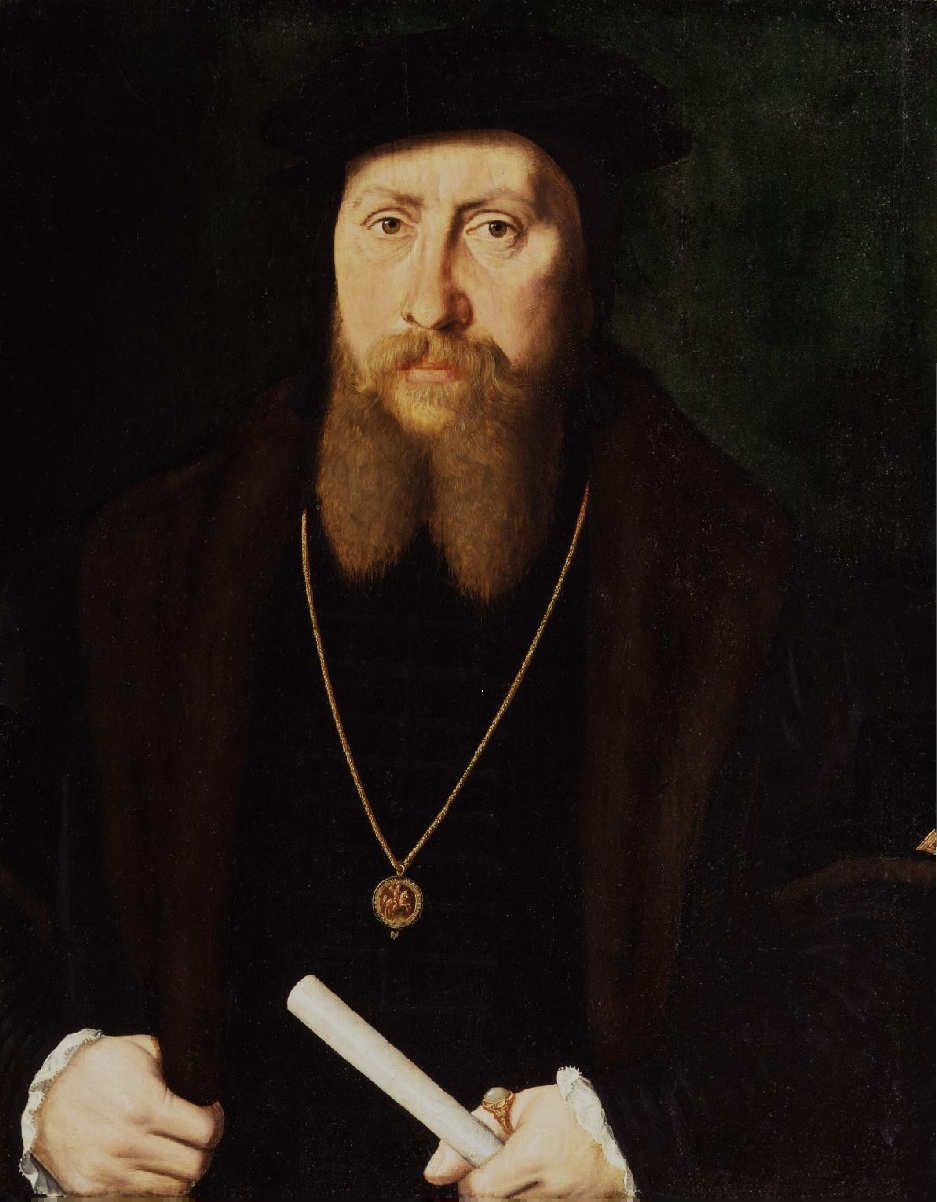
William Paget, 1st Baron Paget

The estate at Beaudesert or Beaudesert Park occupied a large portion of the southern area of Cannock Chase. The estate had three distinct areas; Beaudesert Old Park, north of the Hall, the central area which is wooded and included the site of the hall, gardens and the stables, and Beaudesert New Park to the east and south east of the hall. Beaudesert Old Park formed the largest part of the estate north of the hall. This part of the estate was a deer park and the landscape is wild and dominated by thick forest. It is assumed that the name Beaudesert derived from this landscape, being French in origin and roughly translated to "beautiful wilderness".

The first Beaudesert Hall on the site had been occupied as early as 1292 when it was occupied by the Trumwyns of Cannock. Early in the 14th century it was the palace of the Bishop of Lichfield and Coventry. Following the reformation by Henry VIII the Bishops were relieved of Beaudesert and in 1546, large parts of Cannock Chase including Beaudesert were given to one of the King's closest advisors, Sir William Paget.

Thomas Paget, 3rd Baron Paget, extensively rebuilt Beaudesert Hall between 1573 and 1583. The house was still unfinished and unfurnished in August 1585, when it was suggested that Mary, Queen of Scots might stay at Beaudesert or Burton Manor while Tutbury Castle was cleansed and sweetened. The distinctive Elizabethan east front dates from this time. The majority of the east front was built out of brick with some stone, which was quarried from Cannock Chase. The Bishops formerly had a house of some importance at Beaudesert and much of the fabric of the great hall built during the 14th century remained during the rebuild. In 1629 the Paget family sold the entire estate to James Fitzhugh. The Fitzhugh family managed their estates in Staffordshire, Shropshire and Mid-Wales from Beaudesert Hall until 1732 when the Paget family acquired much of the estate once more. The West Front however remained in the ownership of the Fitzhughs who leased that portion of the estate to the Pagets.

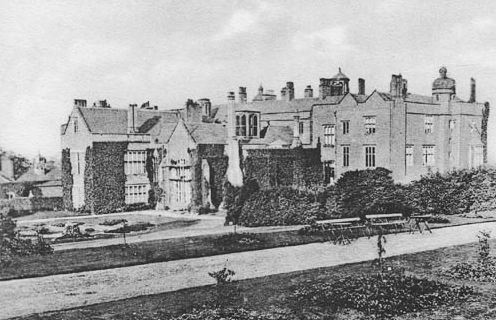
Beaudesert West Front c. 1900

The next significant work on the Hall came in the 18th century under the ownership of Henry Paget. James Wyatt remodelled the interior of the hall in 1771-72. It was at this time when the courtyard was removed and the coach house and stables were erected of white stone in the form of a crescent, 100-150 yards north of the hall. By this time the hall could be approached from nine perimeter lodges. Eight of these lodges still remain as residential dwellings. Grand Lodge, east of the hall was the main entrance. Built in 1814 by John Shaw, the building has many architectural features that were present in the hall. In the 1820s, Joseph Potter made some minimal changes to the exterior but inside much of the original plasterwork and wood was replaced, with Potter also adding a billiard room.

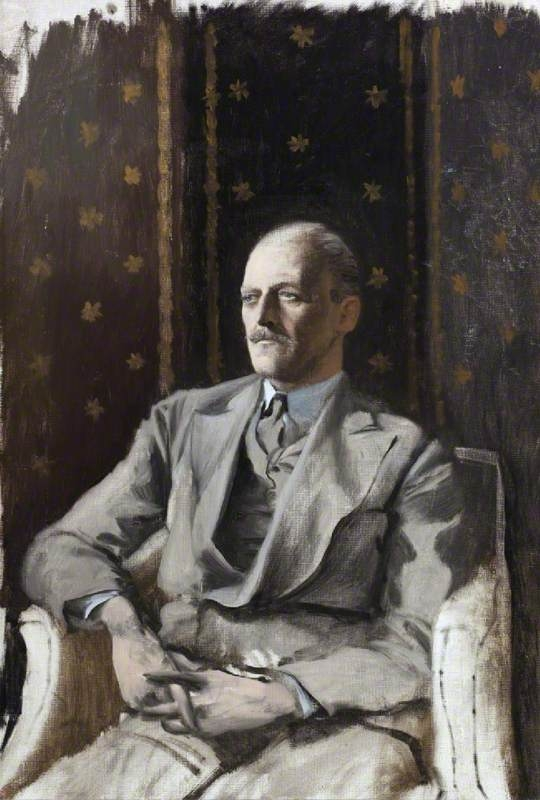
The 6th Marquess of Anglesey, by Rex Whistler

A fire occurred at Beaudesert on 5 November 1909 and a large amount of money was spent by the 6th Marquess in securing the West Front of the estate from the Fitzhugh family and renovating the house and replacing much of what had been done by the predecessors and return to the work conceived by the 3rd Baron Paget. Not a lot of work was done to the exterior of the house except to the west and to the porch on the east front, which was returned to its 16th-century appearance.

In 1920 the 6th Marquess left to live at Plas Newydd on Anglesey. The furniture he did not take with him was sold off during the summer of 1921. Heavy taxation after the Great War meant that the Marquess could no longer afford to maintain the property at Beaudesert, so it was put up for sale. The house was offered to many public bodies, colleges and school authorities but in every case it was found to be unsuitable for purpose.

In 1932 Beaudesert and about 2,000 acres of adjoining land went on sale at auction in Lichfield. No buyer was found for the estate, although the nine lodges were all purchased. In 1935 a further sale was held to sell off the fabric of the hall and stables including fixtures and fittings. The sale for the whole of the fabric of the hall and stables recouped £8,000, and some 20,000 ft^{2} of wood paneling were taken away to grace other buildings. Demolition began in 1935, however was not entirely completed as the demolition firm became bankrupt during the work.

== The Mansion ==
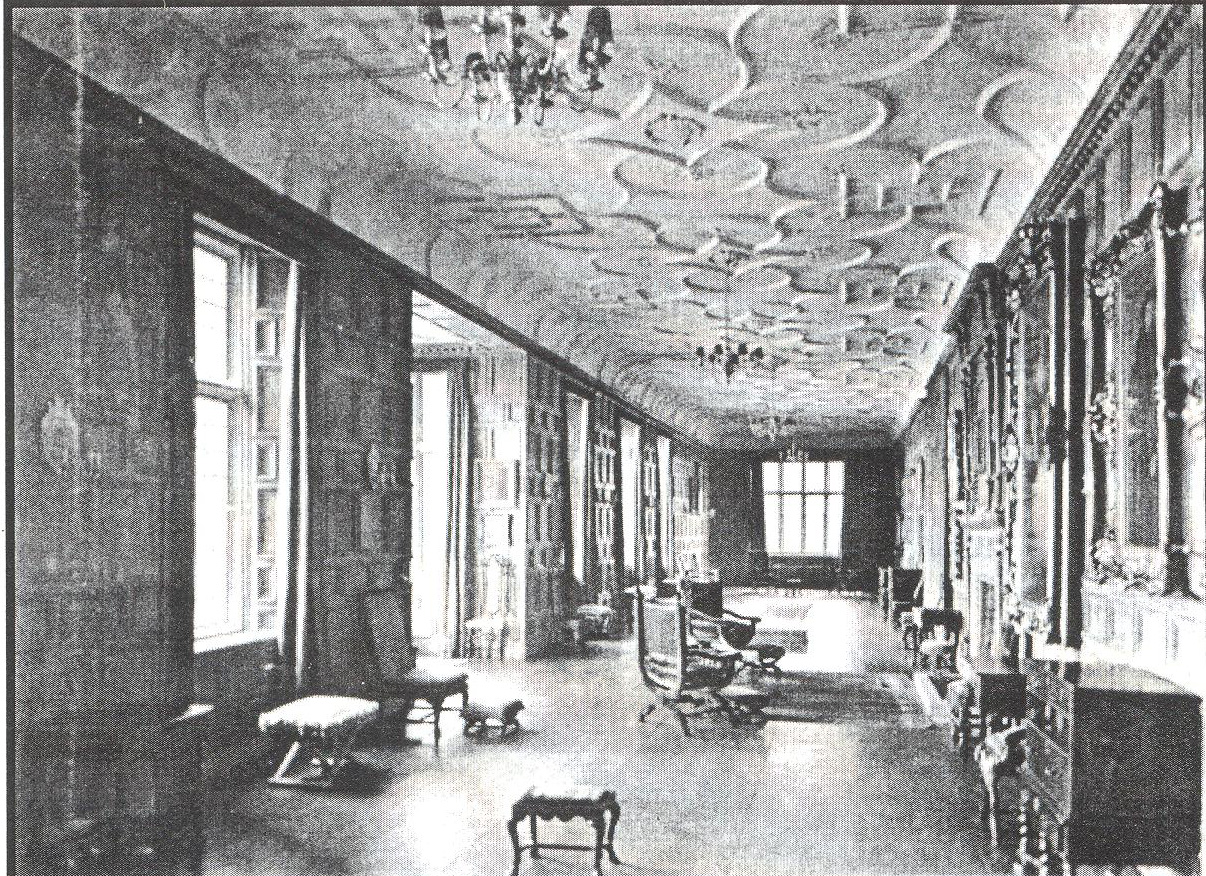
The Long Gallery

The Great Hall was a room of some size, 80 ft long by 22 ft wide. The floor of the room was Hopton Wood Stone, and it had a panelled wagon roofed ceiling. The wall were panelled to 10 ft high in old oak, and above the panelling hung 17th century tapestries. On the south wall were several traceried windows, consisting of two tiers of four very narrow lights. The upper lights were trefoil headed having such massive framework that the central shaft is equal in width to the lights. On the west wall was a stone mullioned leaded light window some 20 ft in height.

One of the most notable features of the hall was the Waterloo Staircase. It was installed by the 1st Marquess after the battle in 1815. The staircase was situated to the right of the upper part of the entrance hall. It had 15 carved newel posts which were surmounted by openwork carved oak lanterns and balustrades. The staircase was bought by Edward and Ursula Hayward and removed to Carrick Hill, Australia in 1935, where it was reassembled and is now on public display. Carrick Hill House also has certain fireplace and panelling on display which were once part of Beaudesert.

An oak linen fold screen which once stood between the entrance hall and the great hall is now at the museum which houses the Burrell Collection in Glasgow. During demolition many of the bricks from Beaudesert were taken to re-face St James's Palace, which had suffered from pollution as a result of coal smoke.

== The Gardens ==
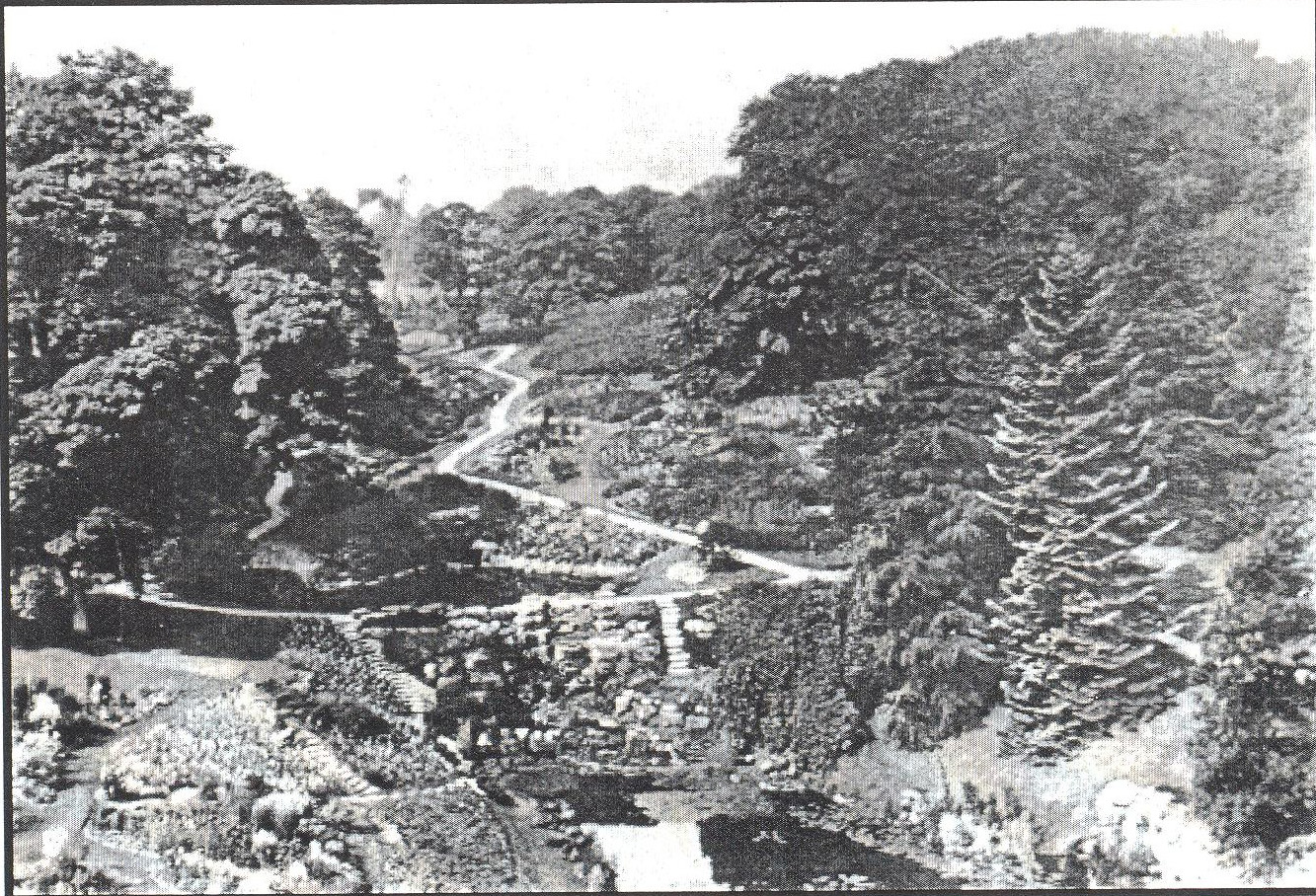
The Gardens

The gardens at Beaudesert (designed by landscape gardener Humphry Repton) were quite large and extended from the hall to Castle Ring. A wide pathway called the Broad Walk ran the length of the gardens. The lower end of Broad Walk near the hall had yew hedge on either side which had topiary in the form of 24 peacock shapes. From Broad Walk access could be gained to the terrace sitting room on the first floor of the hall, by way of a stone terrace, beneath which, and supporting it on the lawn side, were several stone arches. The most outstanding feature of the gardens was a chain of about seven lily ponds. The water would fall from the first pond high up in the garden and cascade by the way of waterfalls into the next one until the water from the last pool but one ran under a stone bridge and then cascaded into the pond nearest to the hall by the way of a 14 ft high waterfall. The gardens were landscapes with ornamental shrubs such as azaleas, rhododendrons and mahonias, these are all still present today and contrast with the surrounding pine forest landscape. In 1937 Lord Anglesey gave 123 acres of land on which the gardens stood to the scouts, guides and other associations and organisations having similar purposes. The Beaudesert Trust was set up to administer the land. A camping site was opened on 2 July 1938 by HRH The Princess Royal. Since then the camp has been used by the scout groups using the site.

== Restoration ==
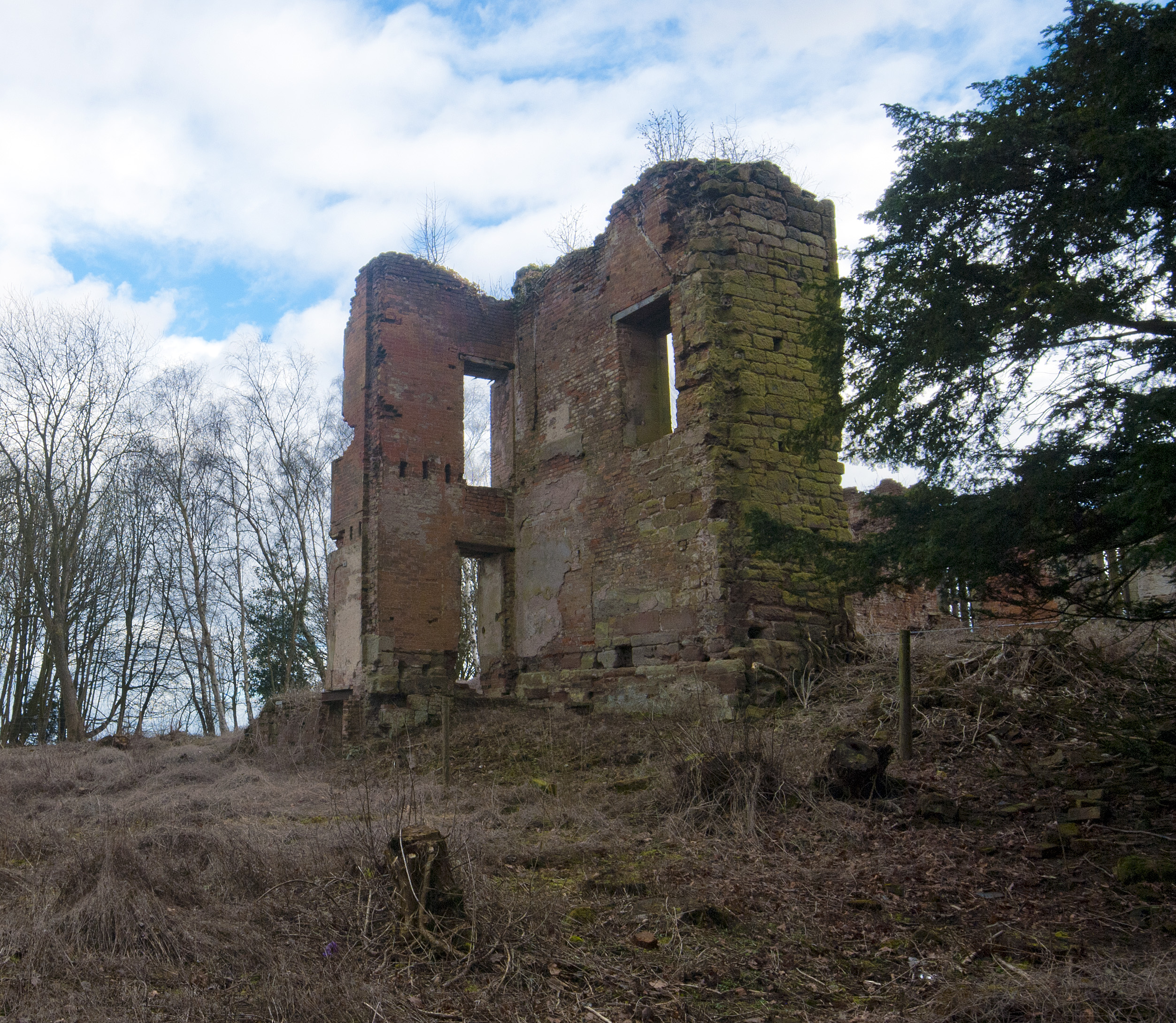
The north west angle of the house

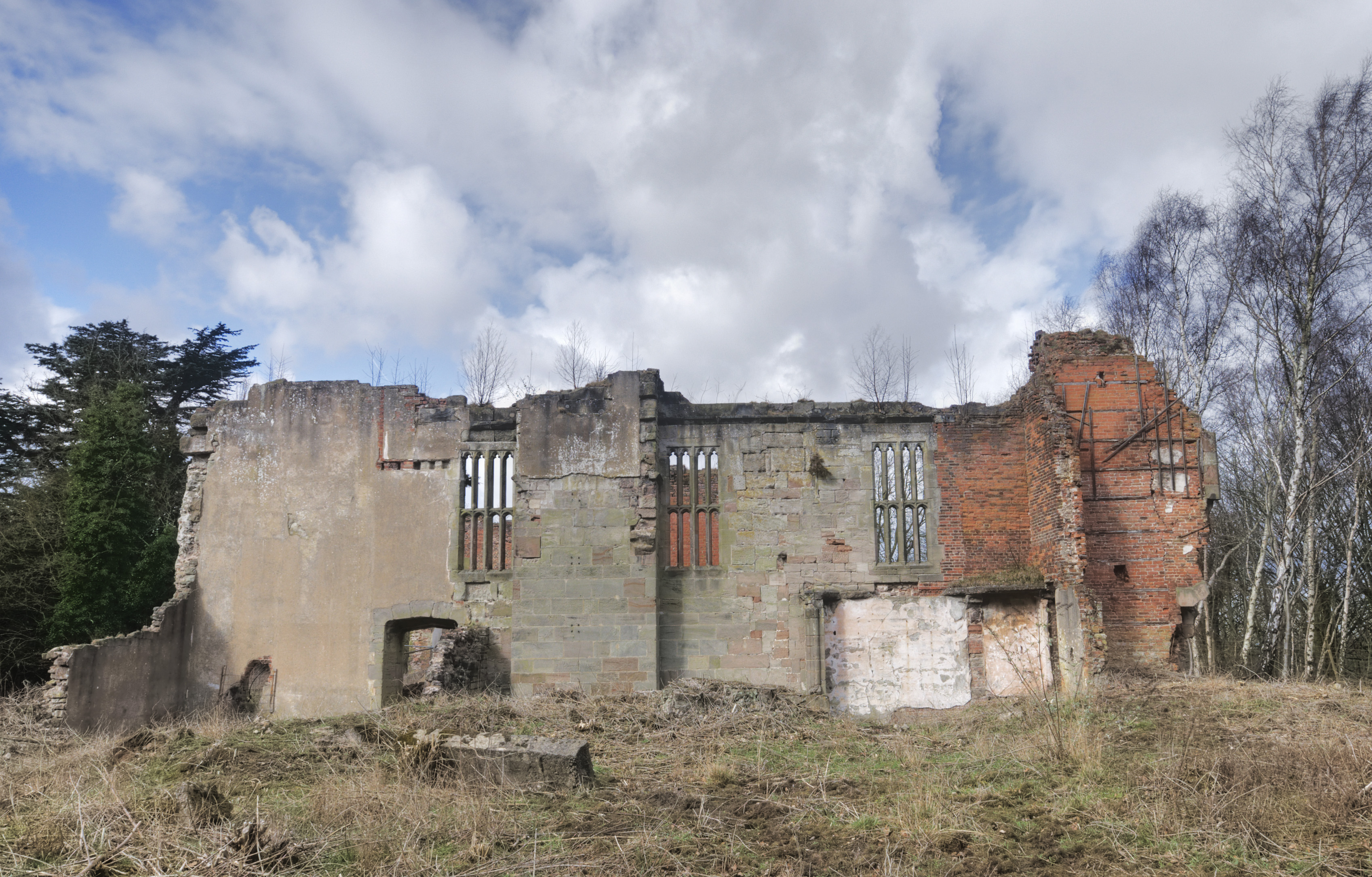
The south wall of the Great Hall

The ruins were protected with Grade II listed building status in 1953. Currently The Beaudesert Trust which owns the remains and gardens is applying to stabilise the ruins and restore the gardens to their original state. The standing ruins consist of three main components; the south wall of the Great Hall, a parallel wall which formed the north side of the Great Hall with an attached fragment of the west wing and the north west angle of the house. The south wall still retains something of its 15th-century character, including some good-quality ashlar masonry, the principal windows, a window lighting the dais, and the remains of a possible fireplace, also associated with the dais.

== See also ==
- Listed buildings in Longdon, Staffordshire
