= Nicholas Bayly =

Nicholas Bayly may refer to:

- Nicholas Bayly (Newry MP) (17th century), MP for Newry in the Irish House of Commons
- Sir Nicholas Bayly, 2nd Baronet (1709–1782), British MP, grandson of the above
- Nicholas Bayly (Anglesey MP) (1749–1814), MP for Anglesey, son of the above
