= Marquess of Anglesey =

Title in the Peerage of the United Kingdom

Marquessate of Anglesey
- Arms of the Marquess of Anglesey
- Creation date: 4 July 1815
- Created by: The Prince Regent (acting on behalf of his father King George III)
- Peerage: Peerage of the United Kingdom
- First holder: Henry Paget, 2nd Earl of Uxbridge
- Present holder: Charles Paget, 8th Marquess of Anglesey
- Heir apparent: Benedict Paget, Earl of Uxbridge
- Remainder to: The first Earl's heirs male of the body lawfully begotten
- Subsidiary titles: Earl of Uxbridge; Baron Paget
- Status: Extant
- Seat: Plas Newydd
- Former seat: Beaudesert
- Motto: PER IL SUO CONTRARIO (By means of its own opposite)
- Arms: Sable, on a Cross engrailed between four Eagles displayed Argent, five Lions passant guardant of the field
- Crest: A Demi-Heraldic Tiger Sable, tufted and ducally gorged Argent
- Supporters: On either side a Heraldic Tiger Sable, maned tufted and ducally gorged Argent

Marquess of Anglesey is a title in the Peerage of the United Kingdom. It was created in 1815 for Henry Paget, 2nd Earl of Uxbridge, a hero of the Battle of Waterloo, second in command to the Duke of Wellington. The Marquess holds the subsidiary titles of Earl of Uxbridge, in the County of Middlesex, in the Peerage of Great Britain (1784), Baron Paget, de Beaudesert, in the Peerage of England (1553). He is also an Irish Baronet, of Plas Newydd in the County of Anglesey and of Mount Bagenall in the County of Louth.

The 8th Marquess carried the standard of Wales at the 2023 Coronation.

The family seat now is Plas Newydd, at Llanddaniel Fab, Anglesey. Most recent marquesses are buried at St Edwen's Church, Llanedwen, built and maintained by the Marquess. The former family seat was Beaudesert, near Cannock Chase, Staffordshire.

== Family history 1553–1815 ==
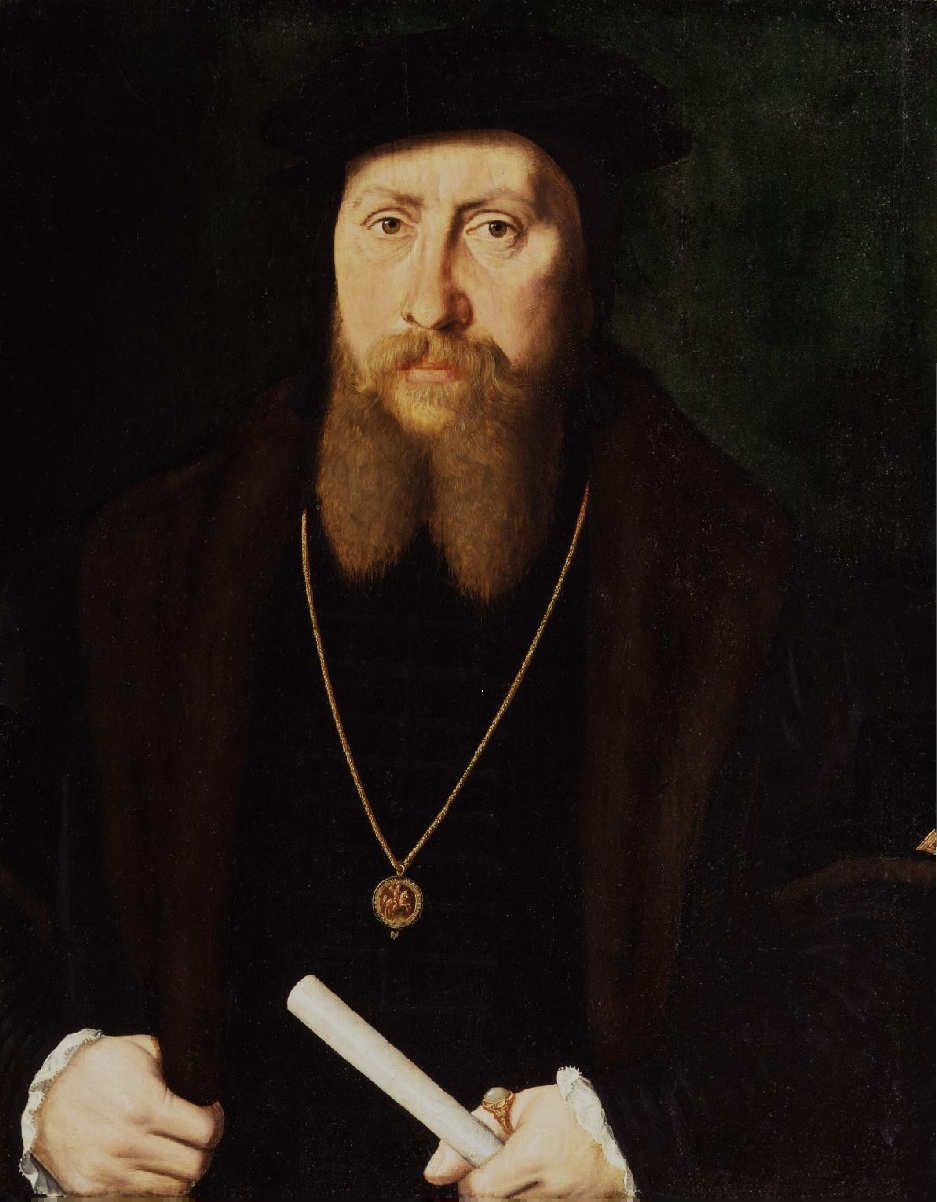
William Paget, 1st Baron Paget.

The Paget family descends from Sir William Paget, a close adviser to Henry VIII, who in 1553 was summoned to Parliament as Lord Paget de Beaudesert. His younger son, the third Baron, was a Catholic opponent of Elizabeth I. In 1589, he was attainted and his title forfeited. However, his son, the fourth Baron, was restored to the title in 1604. In contrast to his father, he was a prominent Protestant. He was succeeded by his son, the fifth Baron. He was Lord Lieutenant of Buckinghamshire for the parliamentarians between 1641 and 1642, when he joined the Royalists and was dismissed. His son, the sixth Baron, was Ambassador to both Austria and the Ottoman Empire. On his death, the title passed to his son, the seventh Baron. He had already been created Baron Burton, of Burton-on-Trent in the County of Stafford, in 1711, prior to succeeding to the barony of Paget in 1713. In 1714 he was further honoured when he was made Earl of Uxbridge, in the County of Middlesex. However, the earldom and barony of Burton became extinct on the death of his grandson, the second Earl (son of Thomas Catesby Paget, Lord Paget), in 1769.

The barony of Paget, which could be passed on through the female line, devolved on his cousin Henry Bayly, who became the ninth Baron. He was the son of Sir Nicholas Bayly, 2nd Baronet, of Plas Newydd, and Caroline, Lady Bayly (d. 1766), daughter of Thomas Paget and granddaughter of the Hon. Henry Paget, second son of William Paget, 5th Baron Paget. In 1770 Henry Bayly assumed the surname and arms of Paget only. Twelve years later, in 1782, he succeeded his father in the baronetcy, and in 1784 the earldom of Uxbridge was revived for him, when he was made Earl of Uxbridge, in the County of Middlesex. He was succeeded by his eldest son, the second Earl. He was a prominent military commander who gained fame at the Battle of Waterloo, where he lost his leg. A few weeks after the battle he was made Marquess of Anglesey.

== Family history, 1815–present ==
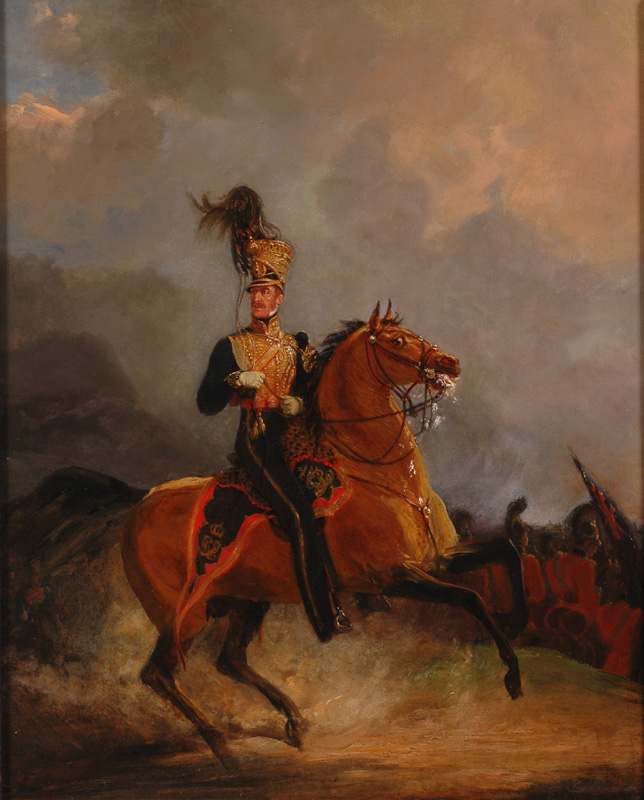
Henry Paget, 1st Marquess of Anglesey, at the Battle of Waterloo.

Lord Anglesey later held political office as Master-General of the Ordnance and Lord-Lieutenant of Ireland. He was succeeded by his eldest son from his first marriage, the second Marquess. He served as Lord Chamberlain of the Household under Lord Melbourne between 1839 and 1841. His only son from his first marriage, the third Marquess, represented Staffordshire South in Parliament. He was childless and was succeeded by his half-brother, the fourth Marquess. He held the honorary post of vice-admiral of North Wales and West Carmarthen. His son, the fifth Marquess, became known for squandering his inheritance on a lavish social life and accumulating massive debts. In 1904 he was declared bankrupt. He died the following year aged only 29 and was succeeded by his cousin, the sixth Marquess. He was the son of Lord Alexander Paget, third son of the second Marquess. He was a soldier and courtier. He was succeeded by his only son, the seventh Marquess, who succeeded in 1947 and who was an author and historian. The seventh Marquess died in 2013 and was succeeded by his son Charles Alexander Vaughan Paget, 8th Marquess of Anglesey (born 13 November 1950). He was educated at Eton and Exeter College, Oxford (graduating M.A.), and at the University of Sussex (D.Phil.) His mother is the writer Shirley Paget, Marchioness of Anglesey, née Morgan. In 1986 he married Georgeanne Elizabeth Elliott Downes; they were divorced in 2011. They have a son, Benedict Dashiell Thomas Paget, Earl of Uxbridge, born 1986, the heir apparent, and a daughter, Clara Paget, born 1988, who is a model and actress. On 13 June 2015, the 8th Marquess married secondly in Mayfair Susan Blanche Louise de Paolis (née Sigmund), formerly wife of Pietro de Paolis.

== Bayly, later Paget Baronetcy ==
Arms of Bayly Baronets, of Plas Newydd: Azure nine estoiles, three, three, two, and one, argent

The Bayly, later Paget Baronetcy, of Plas Newydd in the County of Anglesey and of Mount Bagenall in the County of Louth, was created in the Baronetage of Ireland in 1730 for Edward Bayly, who had previously represented Newry in the Irish House of Commons. In 1712 he inherited substantial estates on Anglesey, including Plas Newydd, still the family's main residence, from a cousin, Nicholas Bagenall. He was succeeded by his son, the second Baronet. He represented Anglesey in the British House of Commons. His son was the aforementioned third Baronet, who had already succeeded as ninth Baron Paget and was created Earl of Uxbridge in 1784.

Note: The Baronetcy has remained unclaimed since the death, in 2013, of the 7th Marquess (16th Baronet).

== Other family members ==
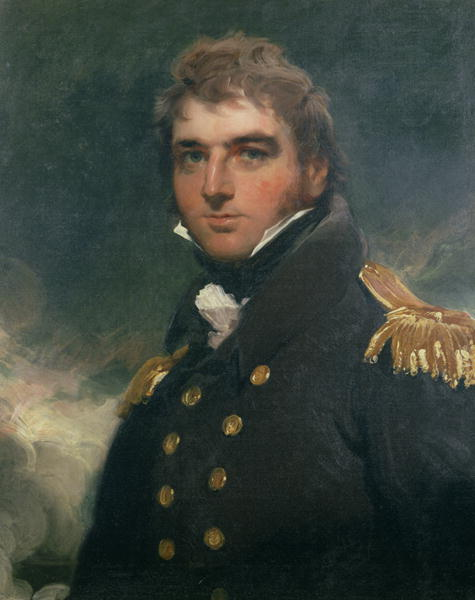
Vice-Admiral Sir Charles Paget, younger brother of the first marquess of Anglesey

Numerous other members of the Bayly and Paget families have gained distinction. Charles Paget, youngest son of the first Baron, was a Roman Catholic conspirator.

The first earl of the 1784 creation was especially prolific in notable offspring. His second son, William Paget, was a captain in the Royal Navy and a Member of Parliament. His third son, Sir Arthur Paget, was a diplomat and politician. (His son Sir Augustus Berkeley Paget was a diplomat. His second son Sir Ralph Paget was also a diplomat. Arthur Paget (1839–1924), son of Stewart Paget, eldest son of Sir Arthur Paget, was a vice-admiral in the Royal Navy.)

The first earl's fourth son, Sir Edward Paget, was a general in the Army. His fifth son, Sir Charles Paget, was a vice-admiral in the Royal Navy. His sixth son, Berkeley Paget, sat as a Member of Parliament for Anglesey and Milborne Port. (He was the father of 1) Frederick Paget, Member of Parliament for Beaumaris, and 2) Leopold Paget, a colonel in the Royal Artillery, whose son Wellesley Paget became a major-general in the Royal Artillery.)

The first marquess also had several notable descendants. His second son, Lord William Paget, was a naval commander and politician. His fourth son, Lord Clarence Paget, was a naval commander, politician and sculptor. His fifth son, Lord Alfred Paget, was a soldier, politician and courtier. (He was the father of (1) Sir Arthur Paget, a general in the Army; (2) Sydney Paget, a racehorse owner; and (3) Almeric Paget, a politician who was created Baron Queenborough in 1918 and who was the father of Dorothy Paget, a racehorse owner, and Olive Paget, a landowner and hostess.) His sixth son, Lord George Paget, was a general in the Army. Lord Alfred Paget is a descendant, and he was a prominent courtier and politician during the reign of Queen Victoria.

Lady Adelaide Paget (1820–1890), daughter of the first marquess, as Lady Adelaide Cadogan, was a prodigious author, most noted for her seminal work on plays and card games.

Lady Caroline Paget (1913–1973), daughter of the sixth marquess, was a socialite and actress. Her sister Lady Rose Paget was also a socialite.

Lady Clara Paget (born 1988), daughter of the eighth marquess, is an actress and model well known for her role in the TV series Black Sails.

Lewis Bayly (died 1631), grandfather of the first baronet, was Bishop of Bangor. His son Nicholas Bayly, father of the first baronet, was a member of the Irish House of Commons for Newry. The Very Reverend Edward Bayly, younger son of the first baronet, was Archdeacon of Dublin. Lambert Bayly, younger son of the first baronet, was the father of the Very Reverend John Bayly, Dean of Killaloe, who was the grandfather of (1) Paget Bayly, a major-general in the Army, and (2) John Bayly, a general in the Army. Charles Bayly, younger son of the first baronet, was a captain in the Royal Navy. Paget Bayly, younger son of the second baronet, was also a captain in the Royal Navy. Nicholas Bayly, younger son of the second baronet, was Member of Parliament for Anglesey.

In 1727, the town of Uxbridge, in the Massachusetts Colony, was named after the Earl of Uxbridge.

== Barons Paget (1553) ==
- William Paget, 1st Baron Paget (c. 1506–1563)
- Henry Paget, 2nd Baron Paget (c. 1535–1568)
- Thomas Paget, 3rd Baron Paget (c. 1540–1590) (forfeit 1589)
- William Paget, 4th Baron Paget (1572–1628) (restored 1604)
- William Paget, 5th Baron Paget (1609–1678)
- William Paget, 6th Baron Paget (1637–1713)
- Henry Paget, 7th Baron Paget (1663–1743) (created Baron Burton in 1711 and Earl of Uxbridge in 1714)

== Earls of Uxbridge, First creation (1714) ==
- Henry Paget, 1st Earl of Uxbridge (1663–1743)
- Henry Paget, 2nd Earl of Uxbridge (1719–1769)

== Barons Paget (1553; Reverted) ==
- Henry Bayly, later Paget, 9th Baron Paget (1744–1812) (created Earl of Uxbridge in 1784)

== Earls of Uxbridge, Second creation (1784) ==
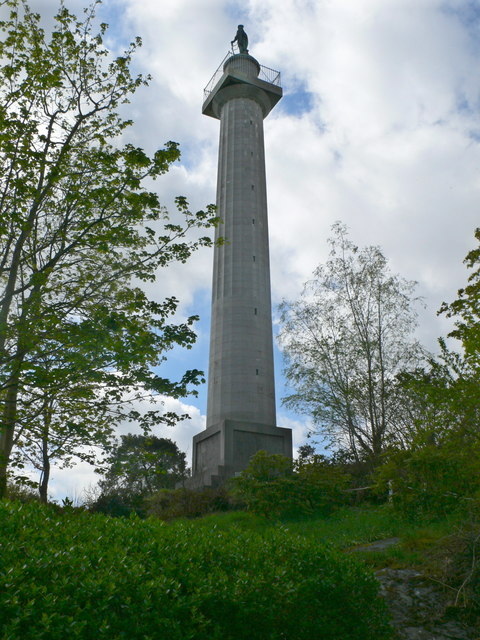
Marquess of Anglesey's column, Llanfairpwllgwyngyll, Anglesey in honour of Henry William Paget, 1st Marquess of Anglesey

- Henry Paget, 1st Earl of Uxbridge (1744–1812)
- Henry William Paget, 2nd Earl of Uxbridge (created Marquess of Anglesey in 1815)

== Marquesses of Anglesey (1815) ==
- Henry William Paget, 1st Marquess of Anglesey (1768–1854)
- Henry Paget, 2nd Marquess of Anglesey (1797–1869)
- Henry William George Paget, 3rd Marquess of Anglesey (1821–1880)
- Henry Paget, 4th Marquess of Anglesey (1835–1898)
- Henry Cyril Paget, 5th Marquess of Anglesey (1875–1905)
- Charles Henry Alexander Paget, 6th Marquess of Anglesey (1885–1947)
- George Charles Henry Victor Paget, 7th Marquess of Anglesey (1922–2013)
- Charles Alexander Vaughan Paget, 8th Marquess of Anglesey (born 1950)

== Present peer ==
Charles Alexander Vaughan Paget, 8th Marquess of Anglesey (born 13 November 1950), an author and artist known as Alex Anglesey and Alex Uxbridge, is the son of the 7th Marquess and his wife, Shirley Paget, Marchioness of Anglesey. Formally styled as Earl of Uxbridge from birth, he was educated at Eton College and Exeter College, Oxford, where he graduated BA and MA, and Sussex University, where he was awarded a D.Phil. In 1986, Uxbridge married, first, Georgeanne Elizabeth Elliott Downes, daughter of Colonel J. A. Downes. They had two children:

- Benedict Dashiel Thomas Paget, Earl of Uxbridge (born 1986)
- Lady Clara Elizabeth Iris Paget (born 1988)

In 1999 he was living at Plas Newydd, Llanfairpwll, Anglesey.

On 13 July 2013 he succeeded his father as Marquess of Anglesey (1815), Earl of Uxbridge (1784), and Lord Paget, of Beaudesert (1549), and also inherited the baronetcy of Bayly, of Placenewyd, Anglesey and Mount Bagenall, County Louth (1730).

In 2015, Anglesey married secondly Susan Blanche Louise de Paolis.

At the coronation of King Charles III in May 2023, he carried the standard of Wales.

The heir apparent to the peerages is the present holder's son, Benedict Dashiell Thomas Paget, Earl of Uxbridge.

== Bayly, later Paget Baronets, of Plas Newydd (1730) ==
- Sir Edward Bayly, 1st Baronet (d. 1741)
- Sir Nicholas Bayly, 2nd Baronet (1709–1782)
- Sir Henry Bayly Paget, 3rd Baronet (1744–1812) (succeeded as Baron Paget in 1769)

see above for further succession

== Family tree and line of succession ==
Marquess of Anglesey family tree

Baron Paget, 1553
William Paget; 1506–1563; 1st Baron Paget
Henry Paget c. 1539–1568; 2nd Baron Paget	Thomas Paget c. 1540–1568; 3rd Baron Paget	Nazareth Newton d. 1583
Attainted, 1587
Attainder lifted, 1604
William Paget; 1572–1629; 4th Baron Paget	Henry Rich; 1590–1649; 1st Earl of Holland
Francis Pierrepont d. 1659	William Paget; 1609–1678; 5th Baron Paget	Frances
Frances	William Paget; 1637–1713; 6th Baron Paget	Henry Paget b. c. 1643
Baron Burton, 1711; Earl of Uxbridge (1st creation), 1714	Baronet of Plas Newydd, 1730
John Egerton; 1646–1701; 3rd Earl of Bridgewater	Henry Paget; 1663–1743; 1st Earl of Uxbridge, etc., 7th Baron Paget	Thomas Paget d. 1741	Edward Bayly; 1684–1741; 1st Baronet
Elizabeth	Thomas Catesby Paget; 1689–1742 styled Lord Padget	Caroline d. 1766	Nicholas Bayly; 1709–1782; 2nd Baronet
Henry Paget; 1719–1769; 2nd Earl of Uxbridge, etc., 8th Baron Paget
Earldom of Uxbridge and Barony Burton extinct, 1769	Earl of Uxbridge (2nd creation), 1784
George Villiers; 1735–1805; 4th Earl of Jersey	Henry Bayly-Paget; 1744–1812; 1st Earl of Uxbridge; 9th Baron Paget; 3rd Baronet	Charles Cadogan; 1728–1807; 1st Earl Cadogan
Marquess of Anglesey, 1815
John Campbell; 1770–1809	Caroline Campbell; 1774–1835	Henry William Paget; 1768–1854; 1st Marquess of Anglesey; 2nd Earl of Uxbridge; 10th Baron Paget; 4th Baronet	Charlotte Cadogan; 1781–1853	Henry Wellesley; 1773–1847; 1st Baron Cowley	Charles Bagot; 1781–1843
Eleanora Campbell d. 1828	Henry William Paget; 1797–1869; 2nd Marquess of Anglesey; 3rd Earl of Uxbridge; 11th Baron Paget; 5th Baronet	Henrietta; 1815–1844	Wellington Stapleton-Cotton; 1818–1891; 2nd Viscount Combermere
Henry William George Paget; 1821–1880; 3rd Marquess of Anglesey; 4th Earl of Uxbridge; 12th Baron Paget; 6th Baronet	Henry Paget; 1835–1898; 4th Marquess of Anglesey; 5th Earl of Uxbridge; 13th Baron Paget; 7th Baronet	Alexander Victor Paget; 1839–1896	Hester Alice	Henry Manners; 1852–1925; 8th Duke of Rutland
Henry Cyril Paget; 1875–1905; 5th Marquess of Anglesey; 6th Earl of Uxbridge; 14th Baron Paget; 8th Baronet	Charles Langbridge Morgan; 1894–1958	Charles Henry Alexander Paget; 1885–1947; 6th Marquess of Anglesey; 7th Earl of Uxbridge; 15th Baron Paget; 9th Baronet	Victoria Marjorie Harriet; 1883–1946
Elizabeth Shirley Vaughan; 1924–2017	George Charles Henry Victor Paget; 1922–2013; 7th Marquess of Anglesey; 8th Earl of Uxbridge; 16th Baron Paget; 10th Baronet
Charles Alexander Vaughan Paget b. 1950; 8th Marquess of Anglesey; 9th Earl of Uxbridge; 17th Baron Paget; 11th Baronet
Benedict Dashiel Thomas Paget b. 1986 styled Earl of Uxbridge
Heir apparent to the Marquess of Anglesey

Line of succession (simplified)
- George Paget, 7th Marquess of Anglesey (1922–2013)
  - Charles Paget, 8th Marquess of Anglesey (b. 1950)
    - (1). Benedict Dashiel Thomas Paget, Earl of Uxbridge (b. 1986)
      - (2). Henry Dashiell Paget, Lord Paget (b. 2021)
  - (3). Lord Rupert Edward Llywellyn Paget (b. 1957)
    - (4). Hon. Jack William Kyffin Paget (b. 1989)

There are other male descendants in remainder to the earldom and barony, descended from the younger sons of the 1st Earl of Uxbridge.

== See also ==
- Baron Queenborough
- Earl of Anglesey, which existed from 1623 to 1761
