= Lewis Bayly (bishop) =

British bishop

Dr Lewis Bayly
- Born: Carmarthen, Carmarthenshire or Scotland
- Died: 26 October 1631; Bangor, Wales
- Education: Oxford University
- Spouse: Anne Bagenal
- Children: Nicholas Bayly

Lewis Bayly (c. 1575 - 1631) was a Welsh bishop and devotional writer.

== Life ==
Bayly is thought to have been born in either Carmarthen or Biggar, Scotland, the curate of Carmarthen, Thomas Bayly, may have been his father. He was educated at Oxford, and became vicar of Evesham, Worcestershire. Later, likely in 1604, he became rector of St Matthew Friday Street. He was then chaplain to Henry Frederick, Prince of Wales, and was later chaplain to King James I, who, in 1616, appointed him Bishop of Bangor. Bayly was an ardent Puritan. He is thought to have died on 26 October 1631 at the age of around 56 and was interred at Bangor Cathedral.

== Works ==
Bayly's fame rests on his book The Practice of Piety, directing a Christian how to walk that he may please God (date of first edition unknown; 3d ed., London, 1613; reprinted as ISBN 1-877611-66-2). It reached its 74th edition in 1821 and has been translated into French, German, Dutch, Italian, Polish, Hungarian, Romansh, Welsh, and into the language of the Massachusetts Indians. The German translation was translated and adapted into Czech by John Amos Comenius. In The Netherlands it became the best sold reformed book of the 17th century. The Hungarian translation was by the puritan pastor and theologian Pál Medgyesi, first published in Debrecen in 1636. It was one of the two books which John Bunyan's wife brought with her—the other one being Arthur Dent's Plain Man's Pathway to Heaven (ISBN 1-877611-69-7)—and it was by reading it that Bunyan was first spiritually awakened.

== Family and descendants ==
Bayly married Anne, daughter of Sir Henry Bagenal. Their son Nicholas Bayly represented Newry in the Irish House of Commons. Nicholas's son Edward Bayly was created a Baronet in 1730. His grandson Henry Bayly succeeded as 10th Baron Paget in 1769 and assumed the surname of Paget in 1770. He was made Earl of Uxbridge in 1784. His eldest son, Henry Paget, 2nd Earl of Uxbridge gained fame at the Battle of Waterloo and was created Marquess of Anglesey (see this article for more information on the Bayly and Paget families). Lewis Bayly died in October 1631.
