= Edward Bayly (priest) =

Irish Anglican priest

Archdeacon of Dublin
- In office 1772-1785

Personal details
- Born: 1709
- Died: 1785 (aged 75–76)
- Parent: Edward Bayly (father)
- Relatives: Nicholas Bayly (brother)
- Education: Trinity College, Dublin

Edward Bayly (1709-1785) was a clergyman in the Church of Ireland during the 18th century. He was the son of Sir Edward Bayly, 1st Baronet (20 February 1684 – 28 September 1741), an Irish landowner and politician, and Dorothy, daughter of the Hon. Oliver Lambart.

Bayly was educated at Trinity College, Dublin. He was Chancellor of St Patrick's Cathedral, Dublin from 1766 to 1772; and Archdeacon of Dublin from 1772 until his death. He was also Dean of Ardfert from 1768 until his death.
