= Edward Bayly =

Irish landowner and politician

Sir Edward Bayly Bt
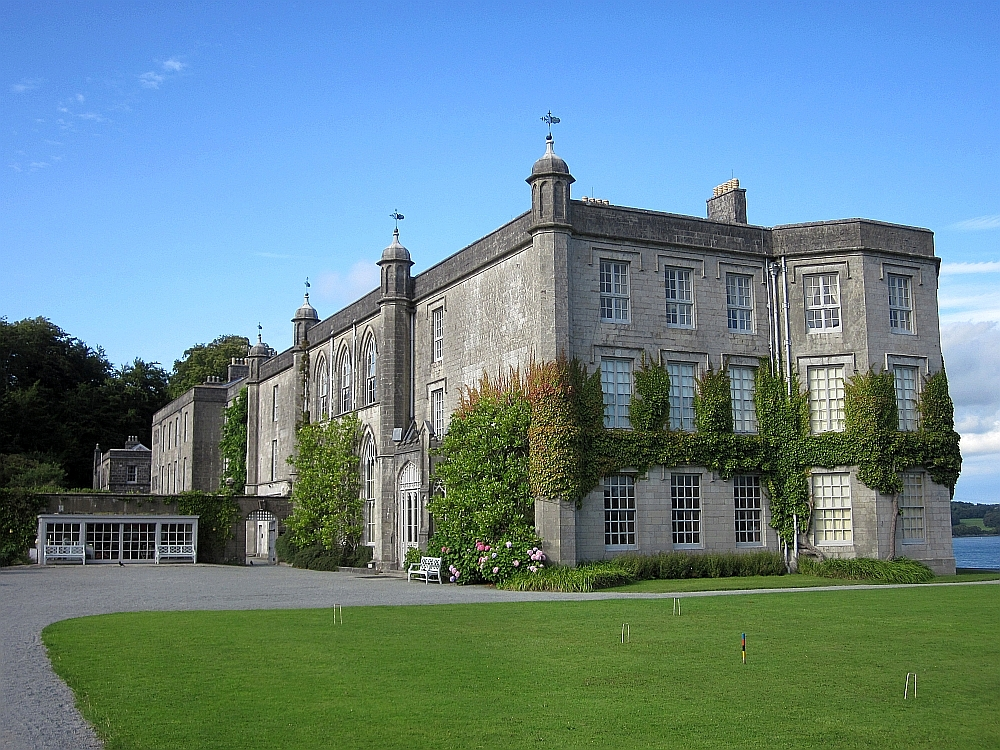
- Plas Newydd, seat of the Bayly family

High Sheriff of Down
- In office 1730

High Sheriff of Anglesey
- In office 1717

Member of Parliament for Newry
- In office 1705–1714

Personal details
- Born: 20 February 1684
- Died: 28 August 1741 (aged 57)
- Spouse: Dorothy Lambart (m. 1708)
- Children: 2+, including Nicholas and Edward
- Parent: Nicholas Bayly (father)
- Relatives: Lewis Bayly (grandfather); Henry Paget (grandson)

Sir Edward Bayly, 1st Baronet (20 February 1684 – 28 September 1741) was an Irish landowner and politician.

== Background ==
Bayly was the son of Nicholas Bayly, son of The Right Reverend Lewis Bayly and Anne, daughter of Sir Henry Bagenal. His mother was Dorothy (née Hall).

== Political career ==
Bayly was elected to the Irish House of Commons for Newry in 1705, a seat he held until 1714. In 1712 he inherited substantial estates in Anglesey, including Plas Newydd, and in Ireland on the death of his cousin Nicholas Bagenall. He was High Sheriff of Anglesey in 1717 and High Sheriff of Down in 1730. In 1730 he was created a Baronet, of Plas Newydd in the County of Anglesey and Mount Bagenall in the County of Down, in the Baronetage of Ireland.

== Family ==
Arms of Bayly Baronets, of Plas Newydd: Azure nine estoiles, three, three, two, and one, argent.

Bayly married Dorothy, daughter of the Hon. Oliver Lambart, in 1708. Their younger son the Very Reverend Edward Bayly became Archdeacon of Dublin. Bayly died in September 1741, aged 57, and was succeeded by his eldest son, Nicholas. The latter's son Henry succeeded as 10th Baron Paget in 1769, was created Earl of Uxbridge in 1784 and was the father of Henry Paget, 1st Marquess of Anglesey, hero of the Battle of Waterloo. Lady Bayly survived her husband by four years and died in August 1745.

Parliament of Ireland
Preceded by Robert Echlin; Adam Swift	Member of Parliament for Newry; 1705–1714; With: Robert Echlin 1705–1707; Hans Hamilton 1707–1714	Succeeded by Hans Hamilton; Robert Clements
Baronetage of Ireland
New creation	Baronet (of Plas Newydd and Mount Bagenall); 1730–1741	Succeeded by Nicholas Bayly
