= Henry Bayly (British Army officer, born 1769) =

British Army officer

Lieutenant-General Sir Henry Bayly GCB
- Born: 1769; Plas Newydd, Anglesey, Wales
- Died: 20 April 1846 (aged 77); Dover Street, London, England
- Relatives: Nicholas Bayly (father); Henry Paget, 1st Marquess of Anglesey (cousin)
- Military career
- Allegiance: United Kingdom
- Branch: British Army
- Service years: 1783–1846
- Rank: Lieutenant-General
- Unit: Coldstream Guards
- Commands: Independent Provisional Militia Brigade, 7th Division; Lieutenant Governor of Guernsey
- Conflicts: French Revolutionary Wars; Flanders campaign; Battle of Famars; Siege of Valenciennes; Battle of Lincelles (WIA); Irish Rebellion of 1798; Anglo-Russian Invasion of Holland; Battle of Callantsoog; Battle of Krabbendam; Napoleonic Wars; Peninsular War
- Awards: Knight bachelor

Lieutenant-General Sir Henry Bayly GCH (1769 – 20 April 1846) was a British Army officer who became Lieutenant Governor of Guernsey. He was colonel of the 8th Regiment of Foot.

== Biography ==
Bayly was the second son of Col. Nicholas Bayly, MP for Anglesey, and his wife, Frances Nettlefold. The family seat was Plas Newydd. His uncle was the 1st Earl of Uxbridge and his cousin was the 1st Marquess of Anglesey. He was created a Knight Grand Cross of the Royal Guelphic Order in 1834 and knighted by King William IV on 18 July 1834. He died at his home at age 77 in Dover Street, Piccadilly, after a long illness.

== Military career ==
Bayly entered the army on 12 April 1783 as an ensign of the 88th Foot. He was promoted from the half-pay of the 85th Regiment to an ensigncy in the Coldstream Guards on 30 October 1790. While holding the flag, he suffered a hand injury at the Battle of Lincelles on 17 August 1793, and was promoted to Lieutenant in the Guards on 31 August 1793 and purchased a Captaincy in the regiment on 10 September 1799. During this period, he fought with the Guards during the invasion of Holland.

Bayly was appointed ADC to the Prince Regent on 9 February 1811, and was breveted major general on 1 January 1812. In 1814 he was given command of a brigade composed of three battalions of militia and sent to southern France. He was appointed Lieutenant Governor of Guernsey in 1816. He retired from that post in 1821 and was promoted to Lieutenant General in 1825. He was then appointed GCH in 1834 and died in 1846.

Government offices
Preceded by Sir John Doyle	Lieutenant Governor of Guernsey; 1816–1821	Succeeded by Sir John Colborne
Military offices
Preceded by Edmund Stevens	Colonel of the 8th (The King's) Regiment of Foot; 1825–1846	Succeeded by Sir Gordon Drummond
