= Surbiton Park =

Neighourhood in Kingston upon Thames, London

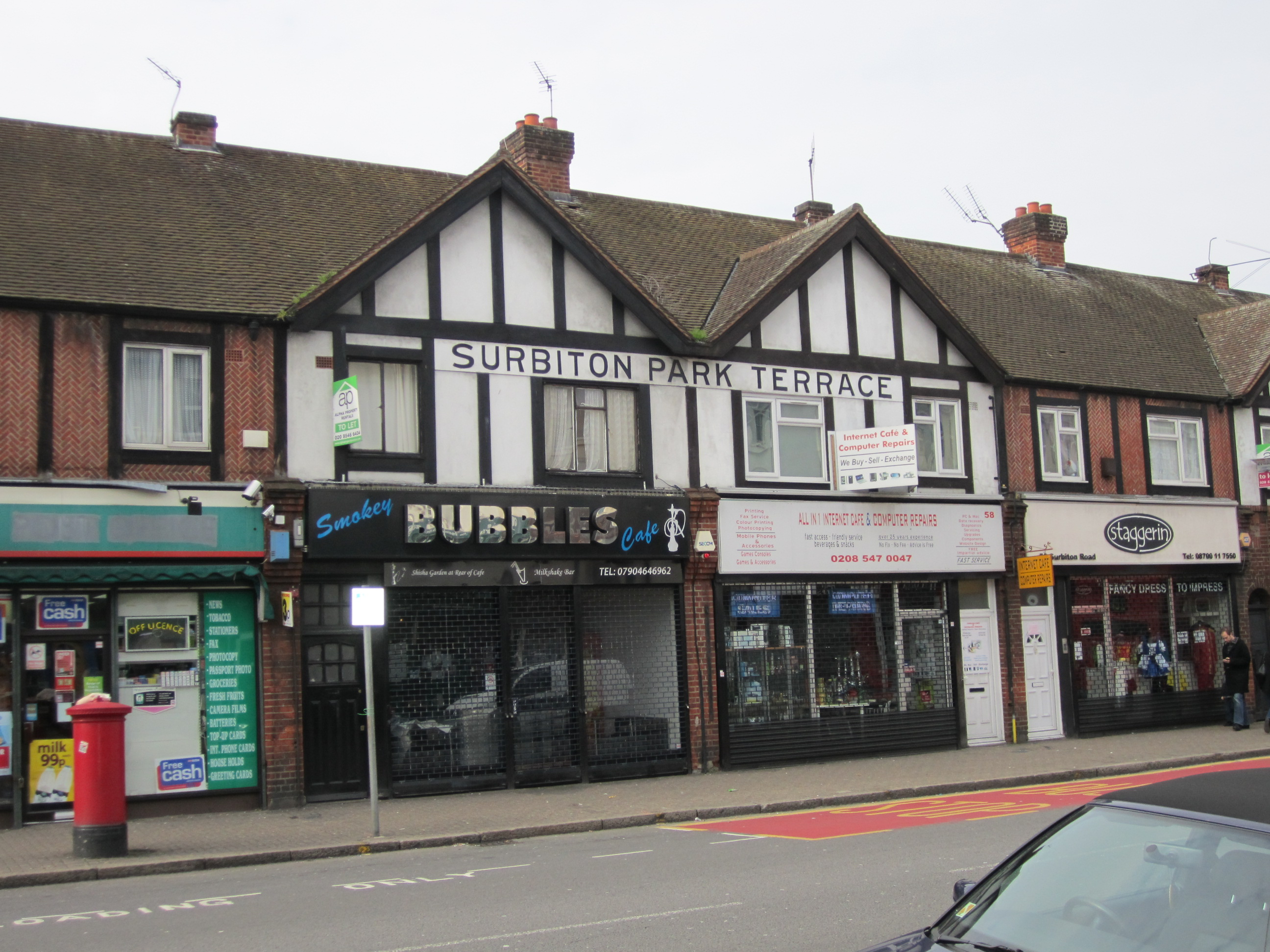
- The last surviving public evidence of the name Surbiton Park. The pillar box marks the site of the former sub-post office.

- Location in Greater London
- Coordinates: 51.3995°N 0.3060°W
- City: Greater London
- Grid Position: TQ178682

Surbiton Park is an area in the Royal Borough of Kingston upon Thames in Greater London, United Kingdom. It was the southernmost part of the pre-1965 Royal Borough of Kingston-upon-Thames in Surrey and corresponds roughly to the southernmost part of the present-day Kingston upon Thames postal district.

It lies between Portsmouth Road, Kingston and Maple Road, Surbiton and includes Surbiton Crescent, Anglesea Road, Palace Road and Uxbridge Road. It is largely residential, but there are office buildings and a school on the eastern side.

The Surbiton Park estate was established after the arrival of the railway in the mid 19th century. It occupies much of the grounds of a minor stately home, which survived until the 1930s.

Surbiton Park was developed as a residential area in the middle of the 19th century after the opening of the London and Southampton Railway. However, by the first decade of the 21st century the name was fading from the public consciousness. It appeared to survive principally in the wording Surbiton Park Terrace on the 20th-century row of shops on the south-west side of Surbiton Road, just to the north of the original park.

During that decade Surbiton Park sub-post office was closed and the bus stop formerly known as Surbiton Park Terrace was renamed Surbiton Road/Penrhyn Road.

== History ==
=== The original park ===
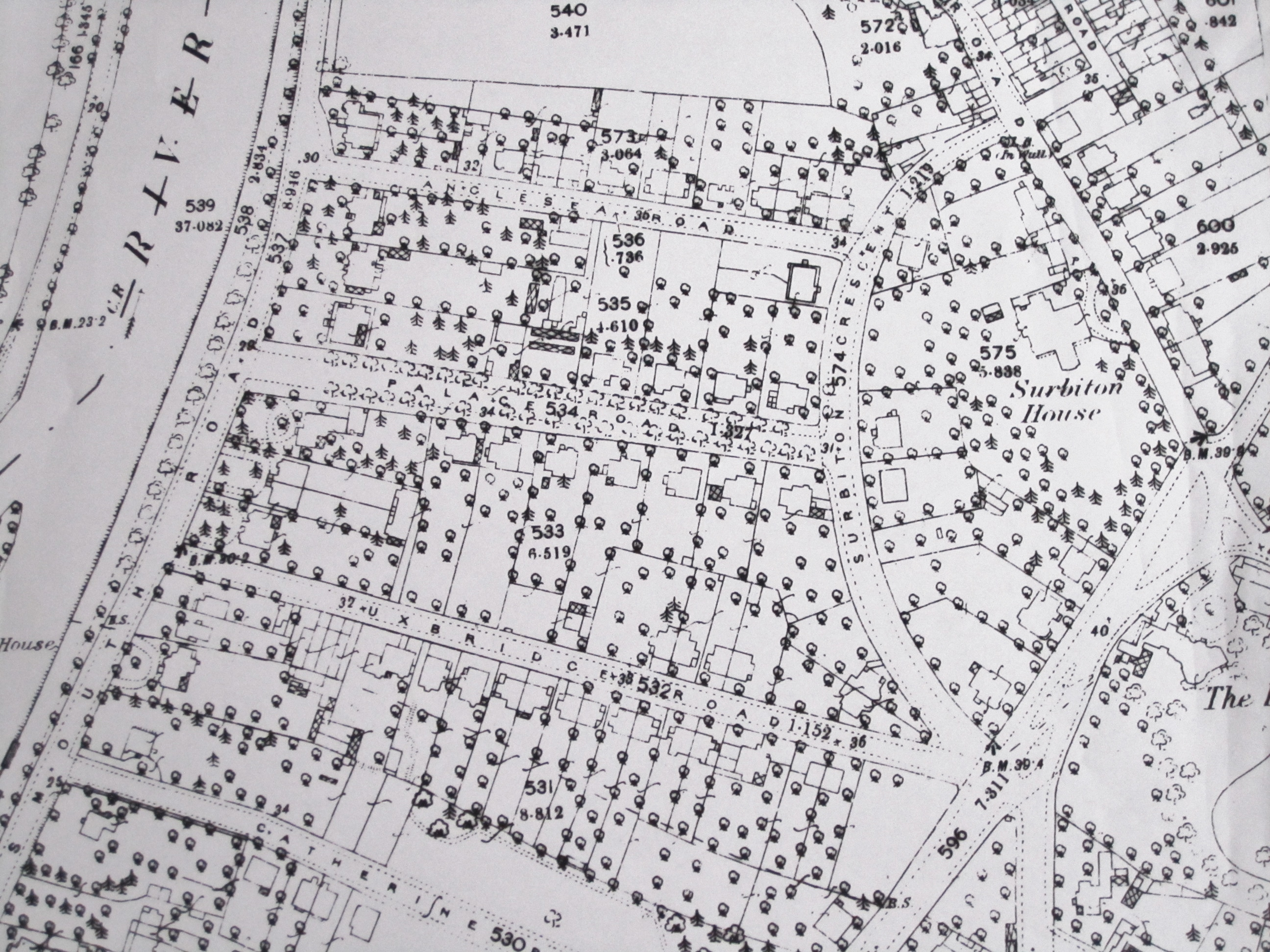
Detail of Ordnance Survey 25in. map 1865, showing Surbiton Park estate

From the mid 18th century until the early 1930s a large house stood on the south-west side of what is now Surbiton Road, Kingston, close to the junction with what is now Maple Road, Surbiton. To the south and west of the main building there was an extensive park.

The house was known at different times as Surbiton Place, Surbiton House and Surbiton Hall. It was built for William Roffee, a wealthy distiller, at the south-eastern end of Surbiton Street, now known as Surbiton Road, the principal thoroughfare of a hamlet of Kingston parish known as Surbiton (or Surbeton).

When Roffee died in 1785, Surbiton Place was bought by Thomas Fassett, who extended both the house and the grounds.

In 1809 Fassett sold the house to Henry Paget, originally Bayly, who became Earl of Uxbridge. His son, also Henry Paget, inherited it in 1812. This Henry was the Earl of Uxbridge who distinguished himself at Waterloo. Not long after the battle, he became the first Marquess of Anglesey.

After his mother died in 1817, Anglesey sold the house to John Garratt, a prominent local politician, who later sold it to Alexander Raphael, a wealthy Roman Catholic.

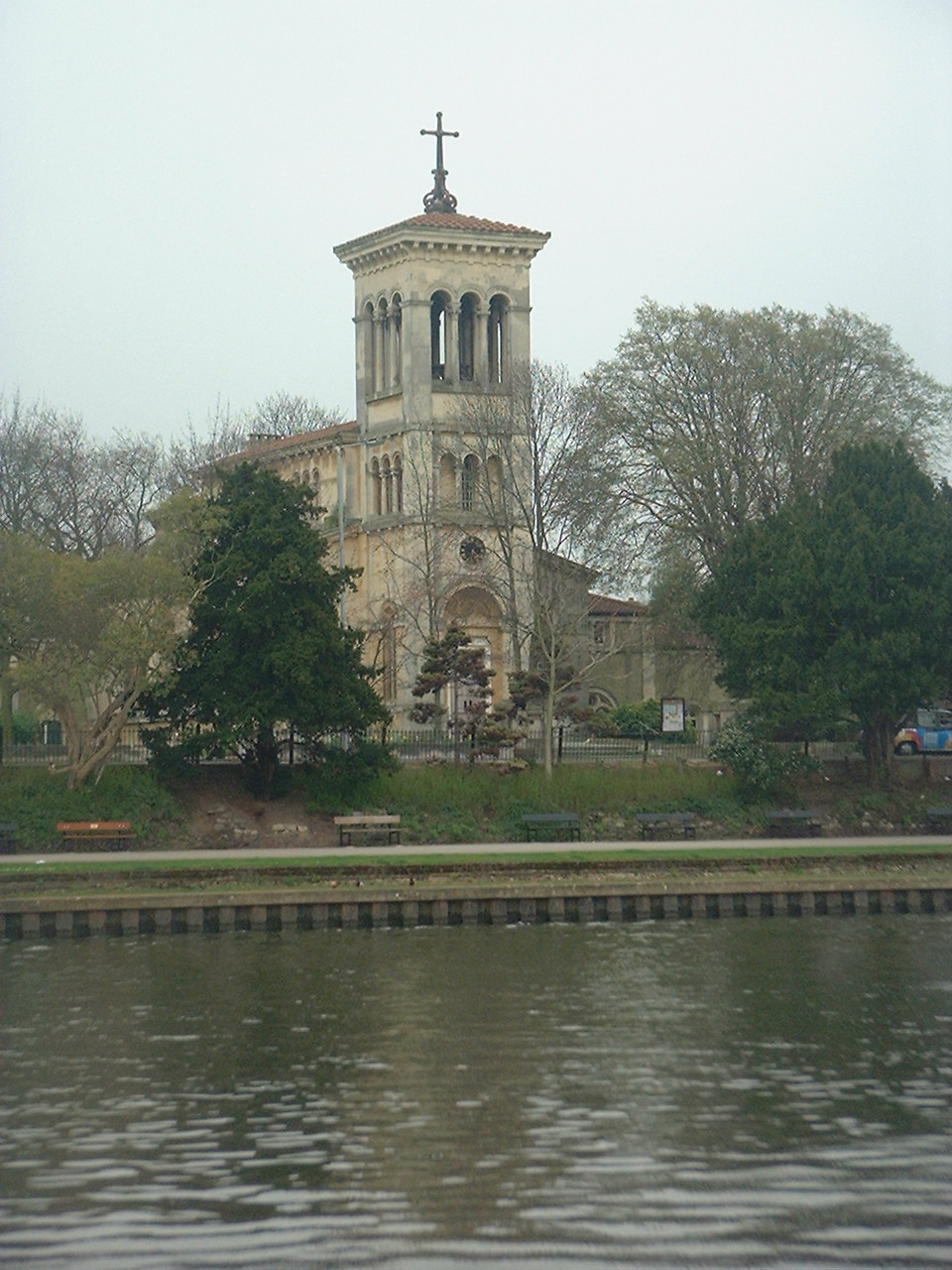
Raphael's gift to Kingston

Raphael paid for the building of a Roman Catholic church on land in the north-western part of his estate. This is the Italianate church on Portsmouth Road known as St Raphael's.

=== Changing times ===
By the time Raphael died in 1850, major changes had begun to take place to the south of Kingston. The railway had reached the area in the late 1830s and the present-day town of Surbiton had started to grow up near the station.

Raphael's heir, his nephew Edward Raphael, sold most of the estate for housing development. Just three acres of land remained with the house, which was occupied by the family of John Shrubsole, a banker and draper, until the death of his widow in 1914.

Generally speaking, the house was known as Surbiton Hall during the Shrubsole period, but there is evidence that it was also referred to as Surbiton House. Adjacent to a 20th-century residential block in Surbiton Road called Garrick House, there is a wall on which is a plaque bearing this inscription:

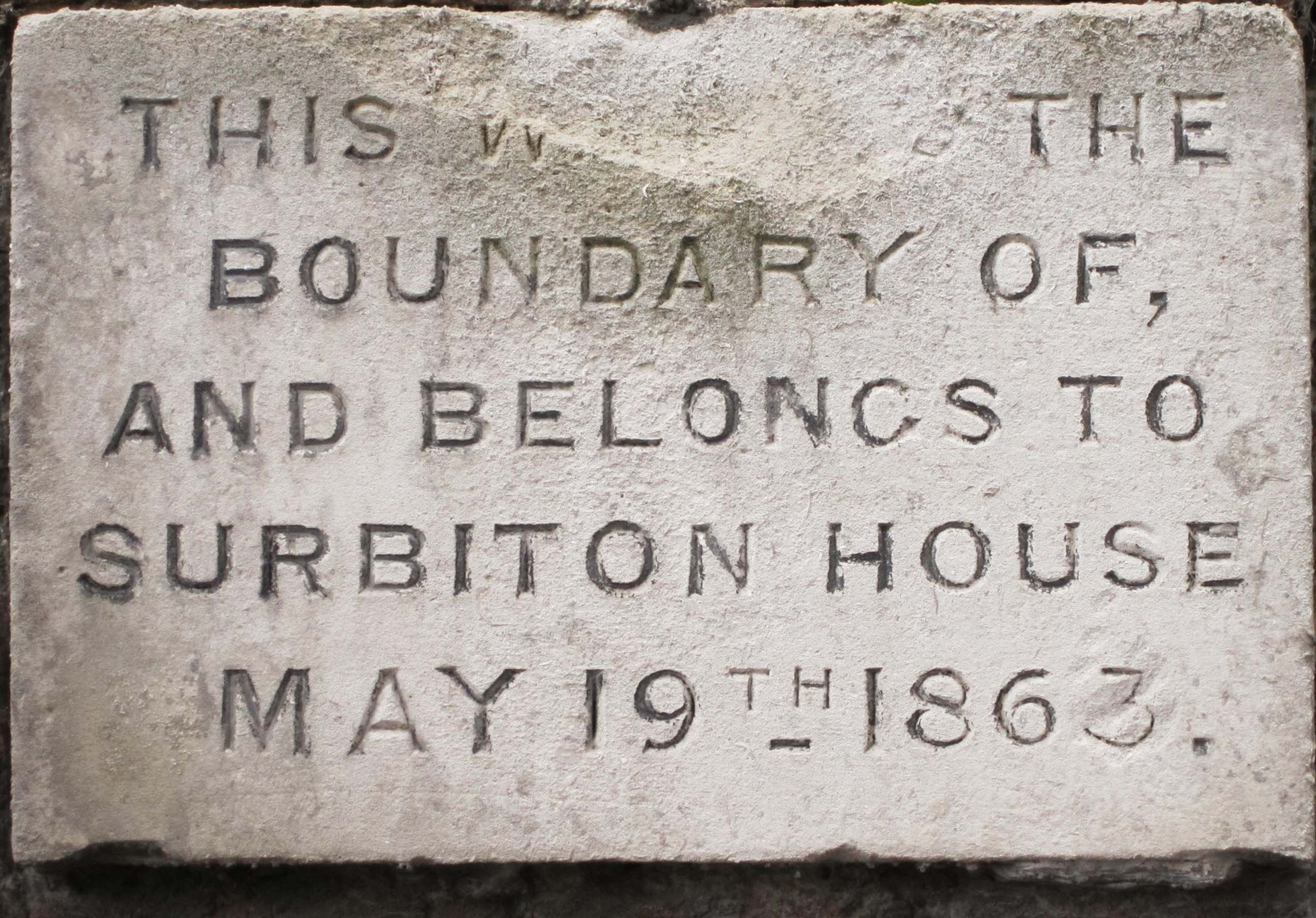
The plaque in 2011. Photo: LynwoodF.

THIS W(ALL I)S THE

BOUNDARY OF,
AND BELONGS TO
SURBITON HOUSE
MAY 19TH 1863.

The name Surbiton House was used for the house on the Elmers estate before 1823, but this was on the other side of Terry's Lane, which ran roughly where Maple Road does today. Both the date and location of the plaque suggest that it does not refer to that house.

In the 1861 census return there is an entry for Surbiton House and Coach House, Surbiton Road. The coach house was across the road, where Surbiton High School junior school now stands. The 1865 edition of the Ordnance Survey 25in. map also describes the building as Surbiton House.

Ten years later, in the 1871 census return, the house is described as Surbiton Hall. The coach house is not mentioned, neither does it appear on the 1865 O.S. map.

=== William Woods ===
Most of Raphael's estate was bought by William Woods, a speculative builder. He laid out the four principal streets of Surbiton Park in what had been the grounds of the house. He built large houses for the well-heeled, including some fine pairs of semi-detached houses, as well as some substantial mansions.

The estate included a considerable amount of land south of the park, but not abutting to it. Woods built houses in several streets in this area, including Cadogan Road, which he named after Anglesey's second wife, Charlotte.

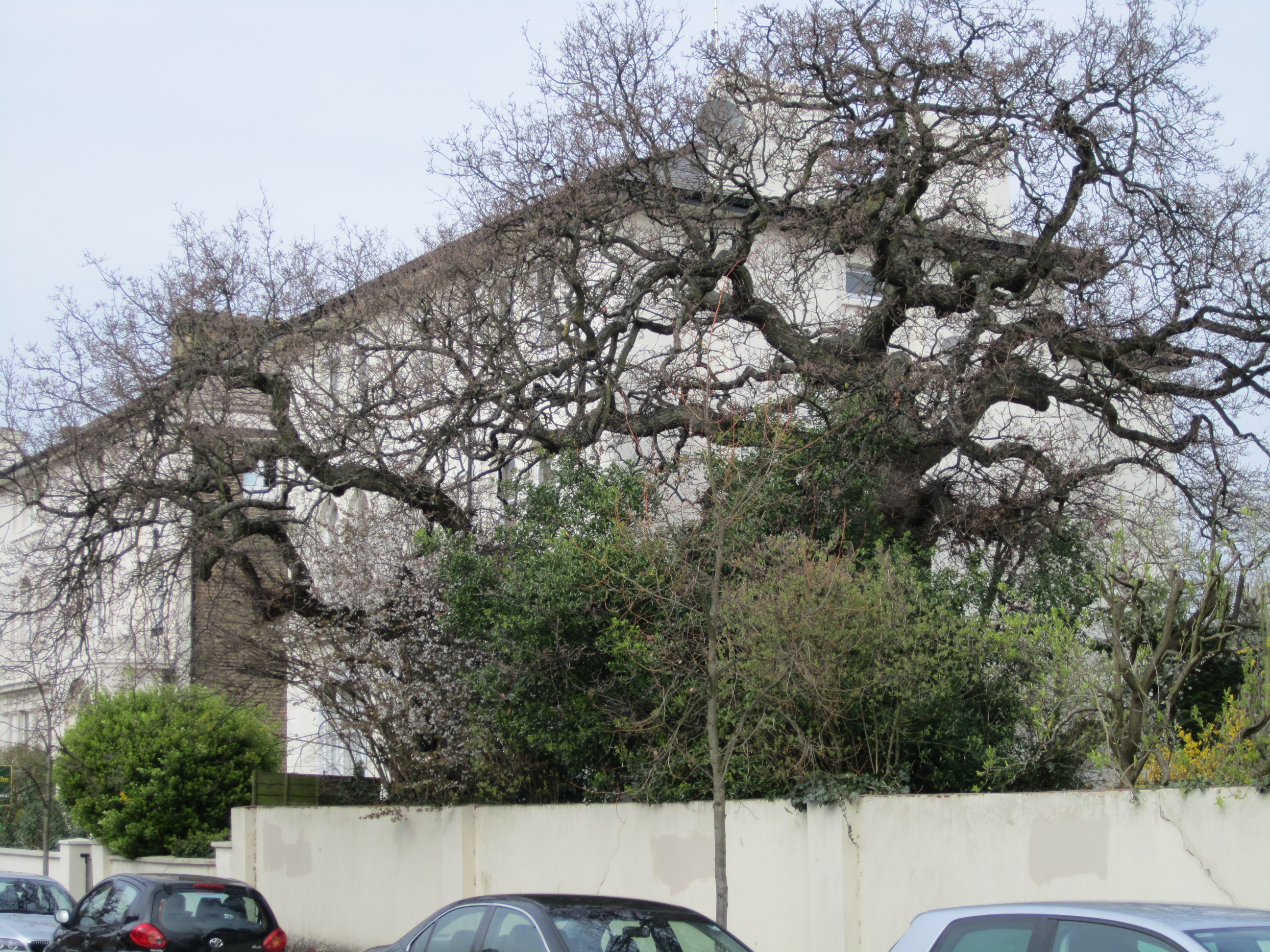
The ancient oak behind The Grove in Maple Road, Surbiton. Beyond it are some of the Woods period houses in Grove Road.

A little later he created Grove Road, which was extended eastwards to connect with Claremont Crescent (now The Crescent). The stretch of the road east of Maple Lane (now Maple Road) was originally called Claremont Road.

A legal document dated 20 Feb 1860 describes Woods as "William Woods late of Swan Lane, Hampton Wick, Mddx., now of Surbiton Park South, Kingston, gent". This suggests that he had moved into one of his new houses, and the inclusion of the word South suggests that he made a distinction between the park proper and the more southerly development.

However, there is evidence that Woods lived in Palace Road, in the park proper. Perhaps he moved within the area or maybe the punctuation of the quoted document is incorrect; "Surbiton Park, South Kingston" would make perfect sense.

Woods played a part in the creation of Queen's Promenade, which runs along the Thames on the other side of Portsmouth Road from Surbiton Park.

=== Surbiton Park Terrace ===
This shopping parade was built in 1851 on the north-east side of Surbiton Road to serve the new residential area. A wide variety of traders occupied the shops. For example, Samuel Fry set up a photographic studio at 9, Surbiton Park Terrace in 1865.

The words Surbiton Park Terrace are visible on the façade of the 20th century parade of shops built opposite the original Terrace.

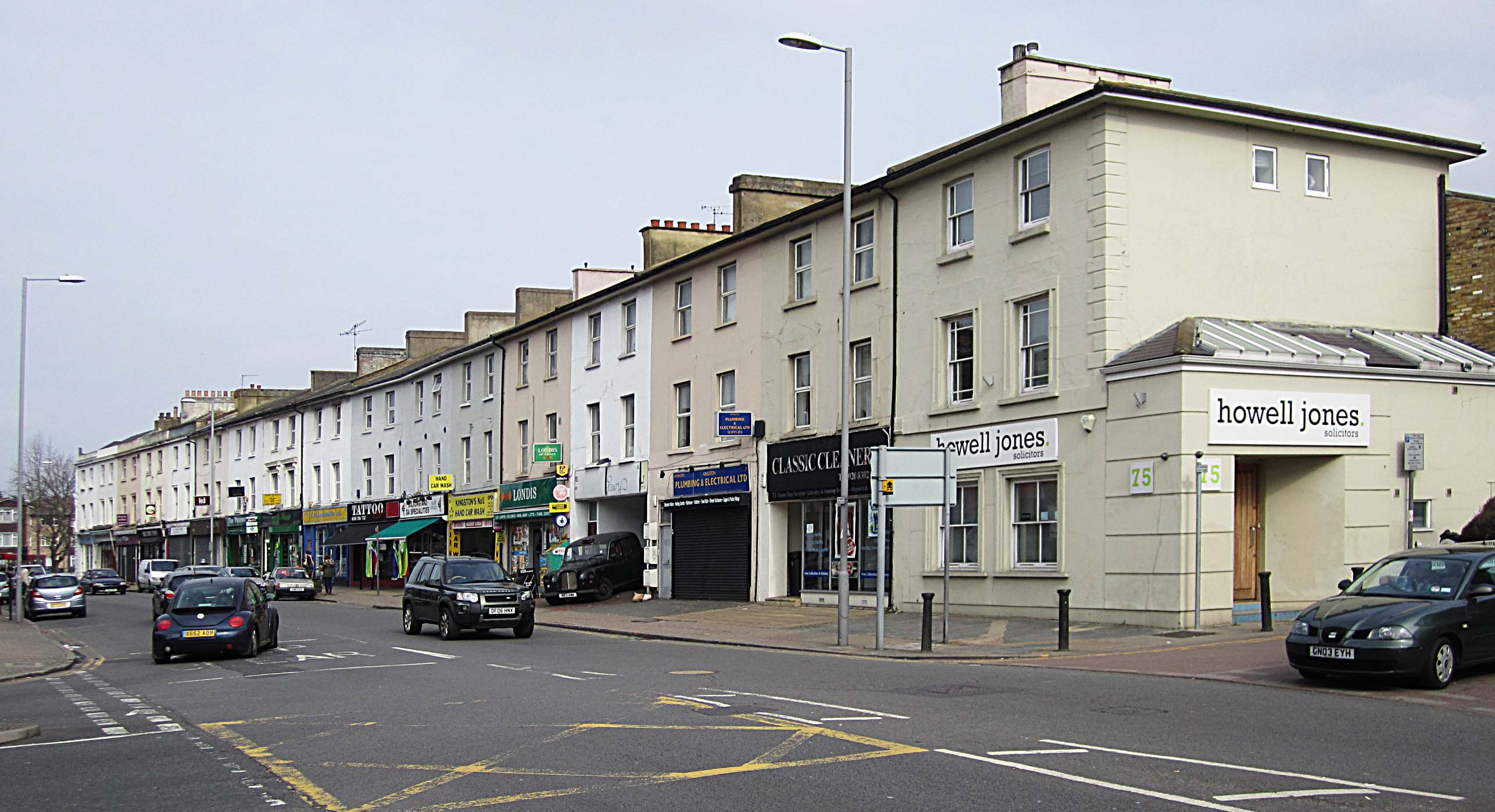
The original Surbiton Park Terrace

=== Surbiton Park Congregational Church ===
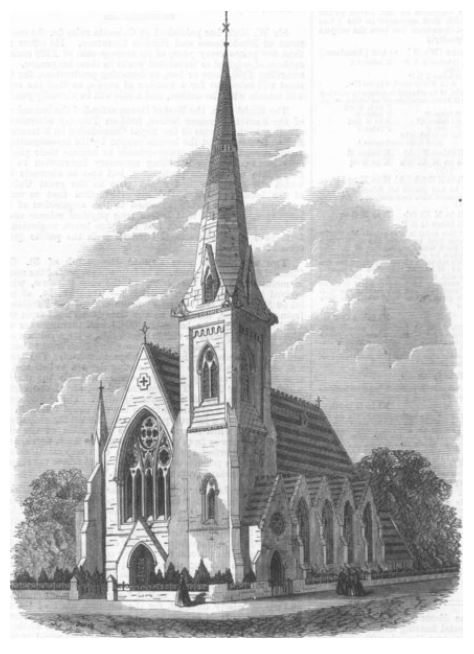
Surbiton Park Congregational Church in 1868.

This striking neo-Gothic building was completed in 1866 and stood on the south-west corner of the junction between Grove Road and Maple Road for more than a century. Its site is now occupied by a row of houses.

Since the demolition of this church there has been no tangible connection between the southern part of the Woods development and the name Surbiton Park.

=== The later 19th century ===
In 1855 the new town of Surbiton was placed in the hands of Improvement Commissioners and this ensured that it was independent of Kingston. The Commissioners were replaced by an Urban District Council in 1894.

The boundary between Kingston and Surbiton ran down the middle of Maple Road to a point a little south of Uxbridge Road, and then turned abruptly west and ran behind the houses on the south side of Uxbridge Road towards the Thames. Thus a large part of the original Surbiton, including the big house and its park, remained inside Kingston and was not subject to the Commissioners. A wall between Maple House and Home Court, both in Maple Road, runs along the line of this former boundary.

In 1884 Surbiton High School was founded by Anglican clergymen and it is still in existence.

=== The 20th century ===
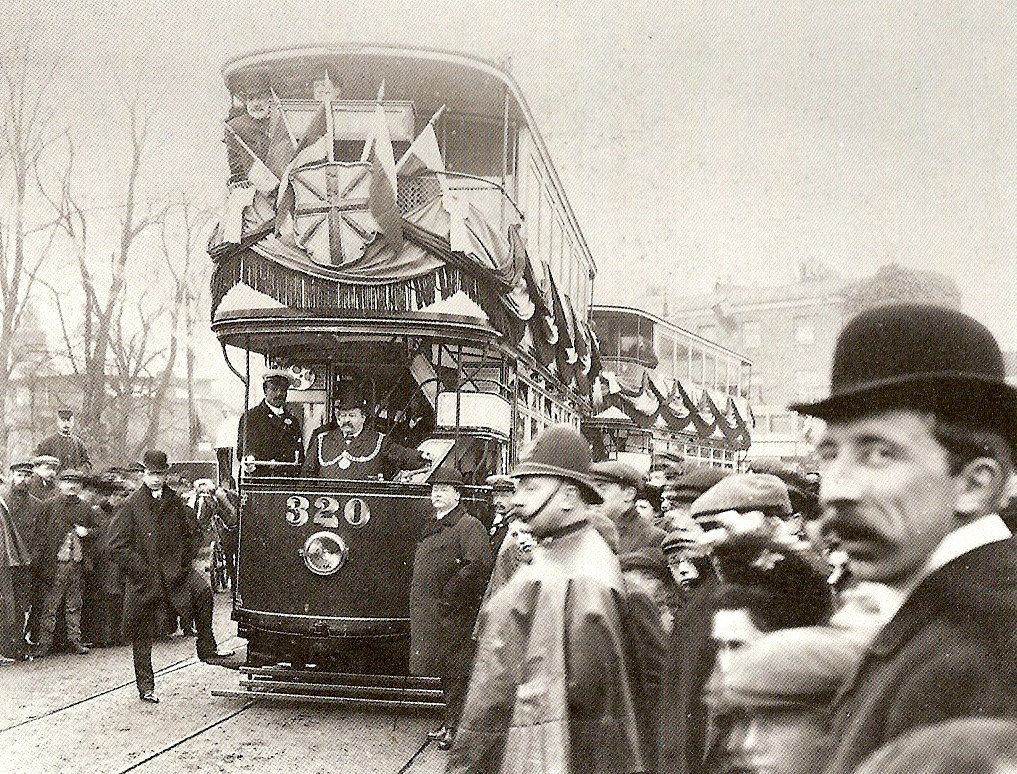
The first tram to cross Kingston Bridge - 1 March 1906. (Public domain.) These trams with roofs were not typical of the trams used on routes through Kingston. Most pictures show open-topped vehicles.

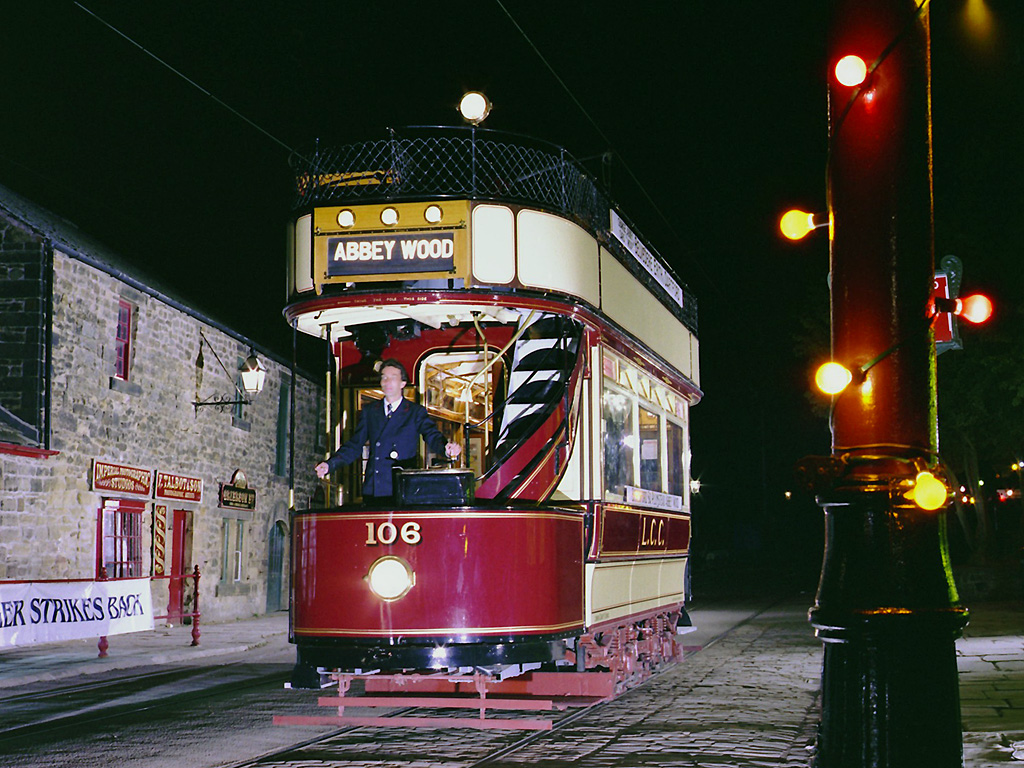
LCC open-topped tramcar by David Ingham. London United used similar vehicles on the route through Surbiton Park.

In 1906 Surbiton Park became a great deal noisier with the coming of the tramway. The route between Kingston and Surbiton town centre passed along Surbiton Crescent, although this necessitated the demolition of a shop at the junction with Surbiton Road.

Mrs Shrubsole died in 1914 after four decades of widowhood. The next occupant of Surbiton Hall was also its last, Sir Sidney Pocock. He had an adventurous life and there is a biography of him, including a history of the house, on the UK Genealogy Archives website.

Sir Sidney died in 1931 and soon afterwards Surbiton Hall was demolished. Semi-detached houses were built in Surbiton Road, Maple Road, Surbiton Crescent and a new cul-de-sac called Surbiton Hall Close.

During the Second World War a V-1 flying bomb, or doodlebug, destroyed houses on Portsmouth Road between Palace Road and Uxbridge Road. This led to the creation of a new road called Home Park Walk.

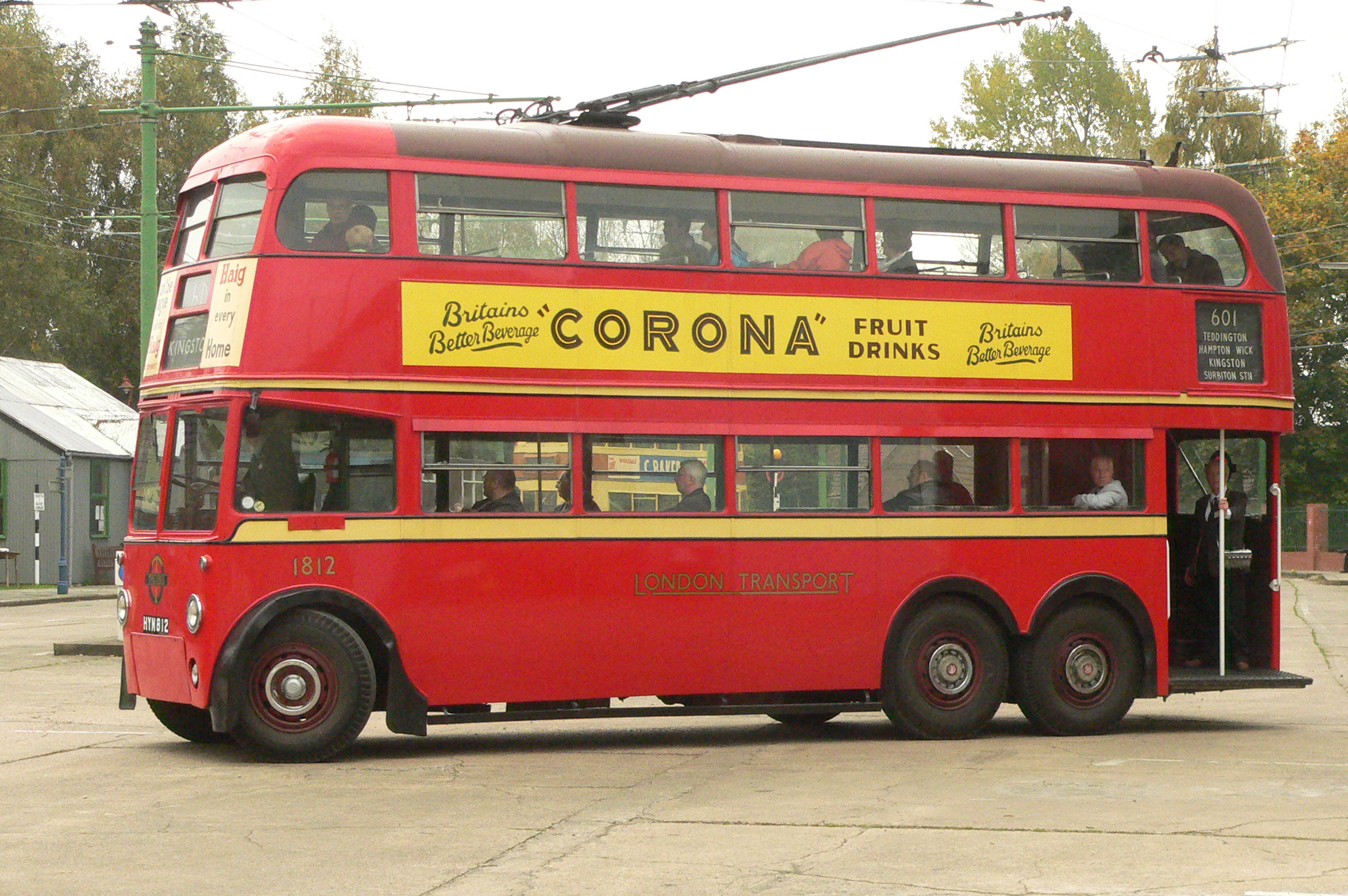
London trolleybus by Dan Sellers. In the middle of the 20th century vehicles like this ran along Surbiton Crescent.

The post-war period has not been kind to Surbiton Park. Many of the Woods mansions and houses have been demolished and replaced piecemeal with blocks of flats and houses of various designs. Only in Uxbridge Road does there remain a substantial group of Victorian houses.

In 1965 the Greater London area was created and Surbiton, which had been granted a Borough Charter in 1936, was incorporated into the new Royal Borough of Kingston upon Thames. The old borough boundary remained for some time as constituency and ward boundaries, but these have now been moved.

During the last two decades of the 20th century attitudes changed towards buildings of historical interest. Steps were taken to protect the architectural heritage of the area and Cadogan Road and Claremont Road Conservation Areas both include parts of Surbiton Park.

== Rough chronology ==
(For references, see History section.)

- No later than 1773. Surbiton Place built for William Roffee.
- Before 1812. Thomas Fassett and then 1st Earl of Uxbridge buy Surbiton Place.
- 1812. 2nd Earl of Uxbridge inherits Surbiton Place.
- 1815. Battle of Waterloo. Uxbridge becomes 1st Marquess of Anglesey.
- No earlier than 1817. John Garratt buys Surbiton Place.
- 1830s and 1840s. New town of Surbiton growing to south of original hamlet.
- No later than 1846. Alexander Raphael buys Surbiton Place.
- 1848. St Raphael's Church completed.
- 1850. Raphael dies.
- 1850 or later. Shrubsole family moves into Surbiton Place, now Surbiton House or Hall.
- 1850s. William Woods buys most of Raphael estate. Surbiton Park estate created.
- 1854. Anglesey dies.
- 1866. Surbiton Park Congregational Church completed.
- 1884. Surbiton High School founded.
- 1906. Tramway opens through Surbiton Park.
- 1914. Mrs Shrubsole dies.
- 1914 or later. Sir Sidney Pocock at Surbiton Hall.
- 1931. Sir Sidney dies.
- 1931 or later. Surbiton Hall demolished.
- Second World War. V-1 flying bomb falls on Surbiton Park.
- Second half of 20th century. Much redevelopment in Surbiton Park.
- 1970s. Surbiton Park Congregational Church demolished.
- Late 20th century. Conservation areas established.
- Early 21st century. Surbiton Park Post Office closes.

== Streets ==
=== Surbiton Crescent ===
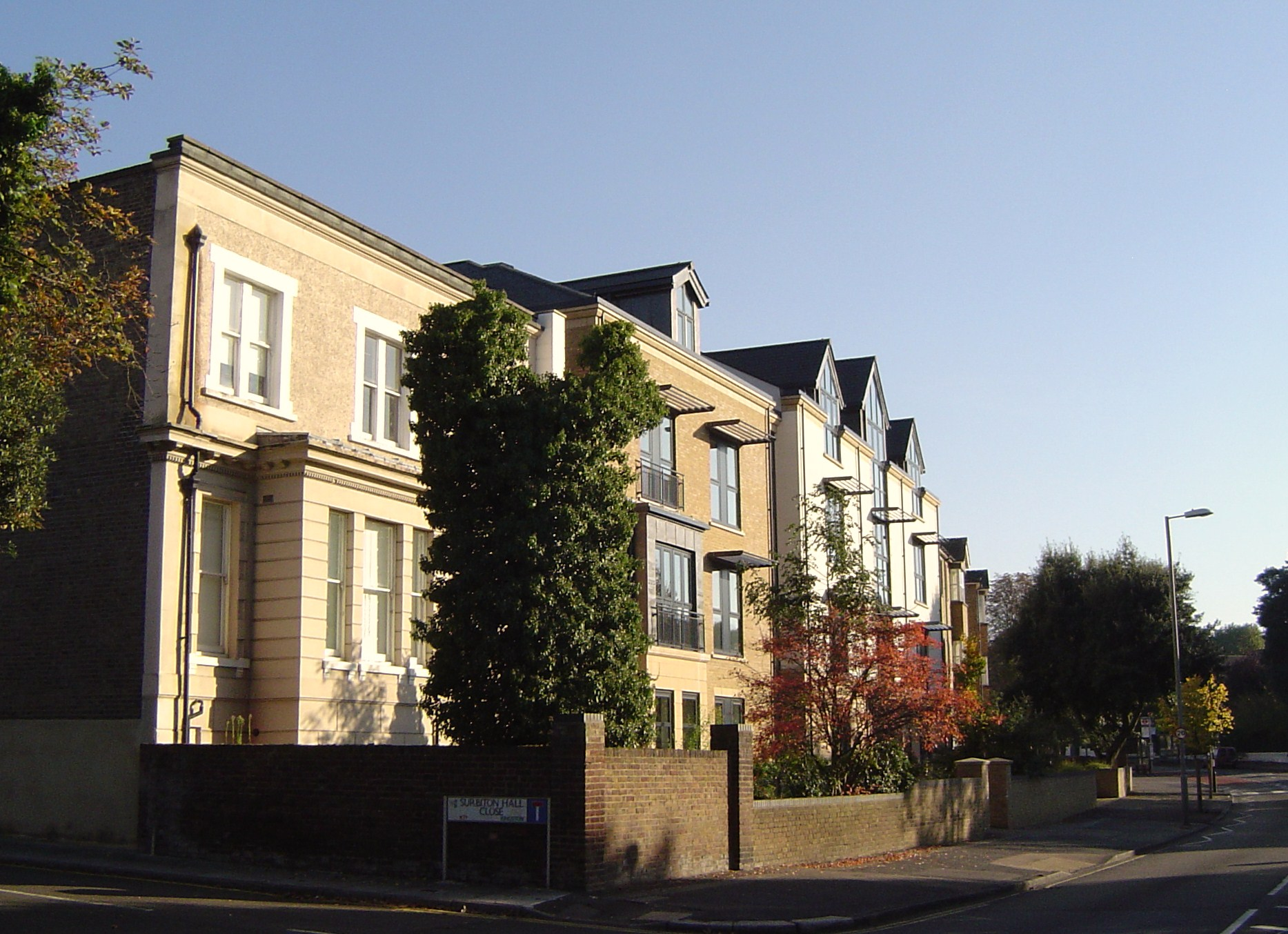
Surbiton High School. Photo: Motmit.

This gently curving road is the principal thoroughfare of the area. The main bus route between Kingston and Surbiton town centres passes along it, as did the tram and then trolleybus routes in earlier times.

Just one Victorian mansion survives, at the northern end of the western side.

The greater part of the eastern side is taken up by Surbiton High School, a well respected independent Church of England school, mainly for girls.

An office building called Sutherland House stands on the northern side of the junction with Maple Road, Surbiton. It replaces a Victorian mansion of the same name which served as a school for a while in the 19th century. It is understood that Thomas Anstey Guthrie, the writer F. Anstey, attended this school and used it as a model for the school in his 1882 novel Vice Versa.

One mansion survives on Maple Road, just to the north of Sutherland House. It is now used as offices.

=== Anglesea Road ===
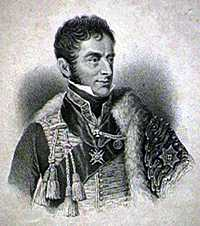
Henry Paget, 2nd Earl of Uxbridge and 1st Marquess of Anglesey.

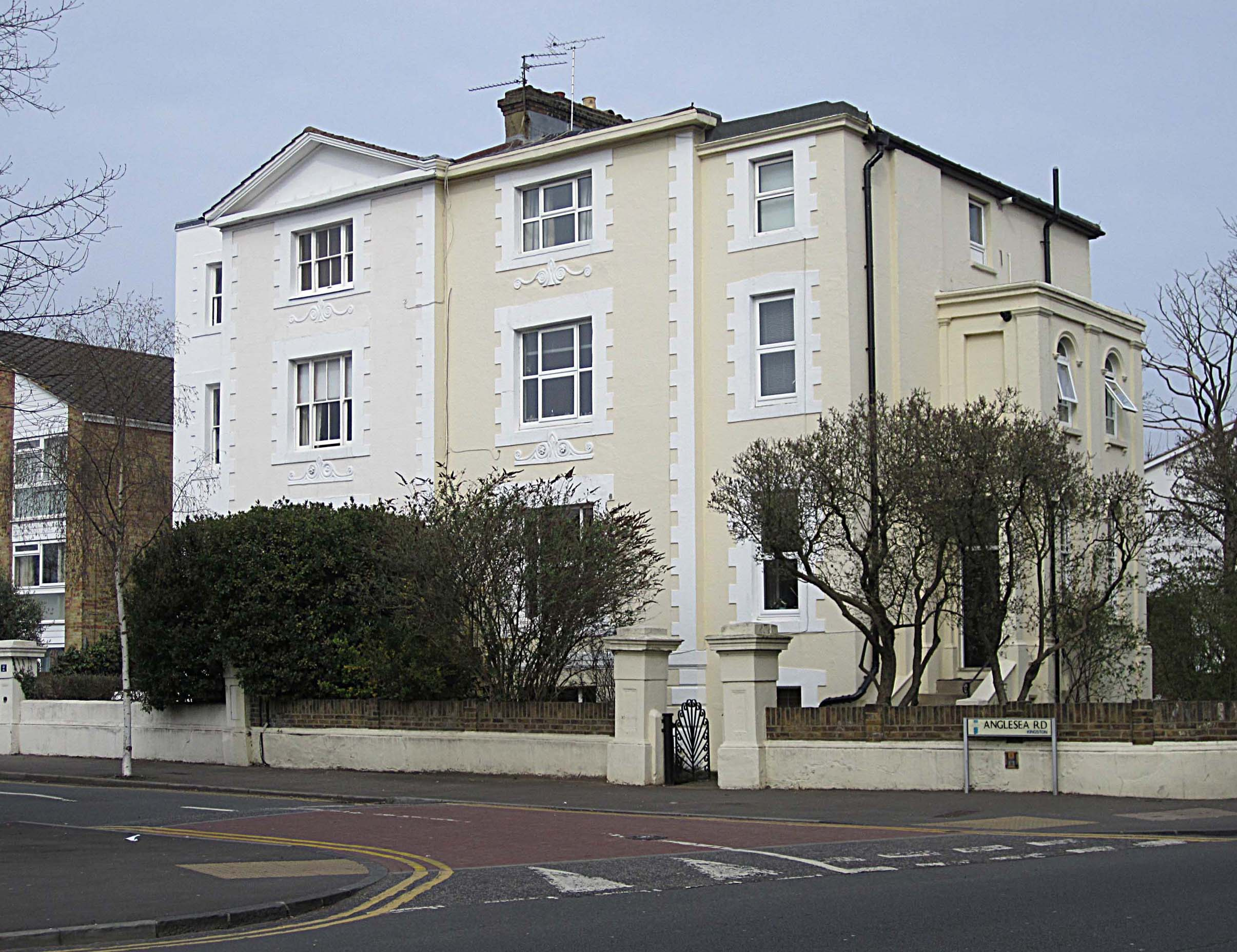
Houses in Anglesea Road

The eccentric spelling of this road's name remains as a historical curiosity, but it is clear that it was named in honour of Henry Paget, 1st Marquess of Anglesey, the most illustrious owner of Surbiton Place.

He played a significant rôle in the Battle of Waterloo and was awarded his marquessate shortly afterwards. Towards the end of the battle he lost a leg, but survived this injury and lived on into his middle 80s.

However, he did not live in the house to any great extent after he inherited it, selling it when his mother died.

An aerial photograph said to have been taken in June, 1920 shows a good number of Woods period houses on the north side of Anglesea Road. Of these nos. 1 and 2, which are a pair of semi-detached houses, and no. 12, which is attached to 28, Portsmouth Road (Anglesea Lodge), have survived.

Between St Raphael's Church and Anglesea Road there is a development of between-the-wars houses called Riverside Close. In the aerial picture this area appears to be a field, so it is clear that it never formed part of the Woods estate.

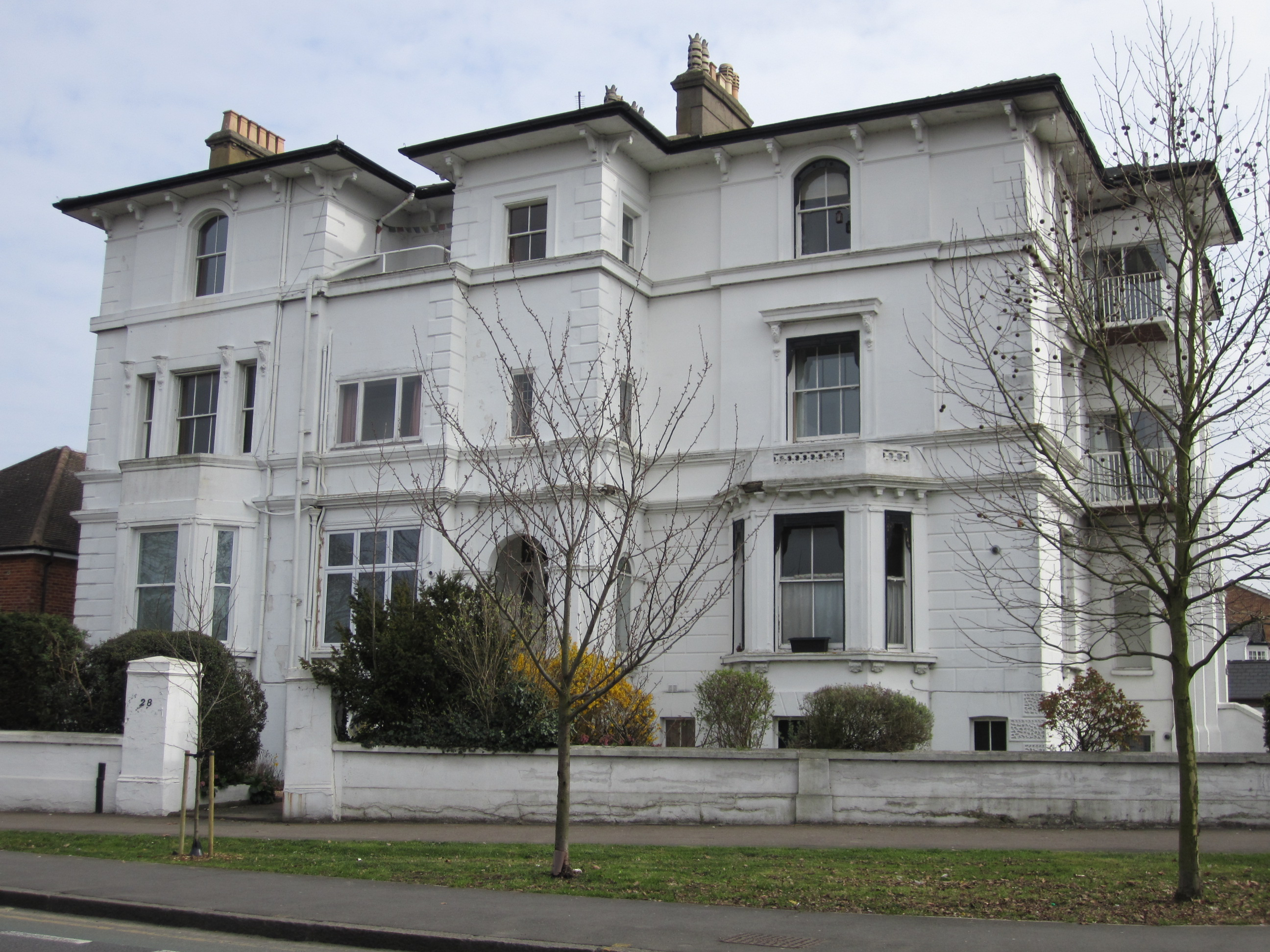
Surviving houses at the corner of Portsmouth and Anglesea Roads

=== Palace Road ===
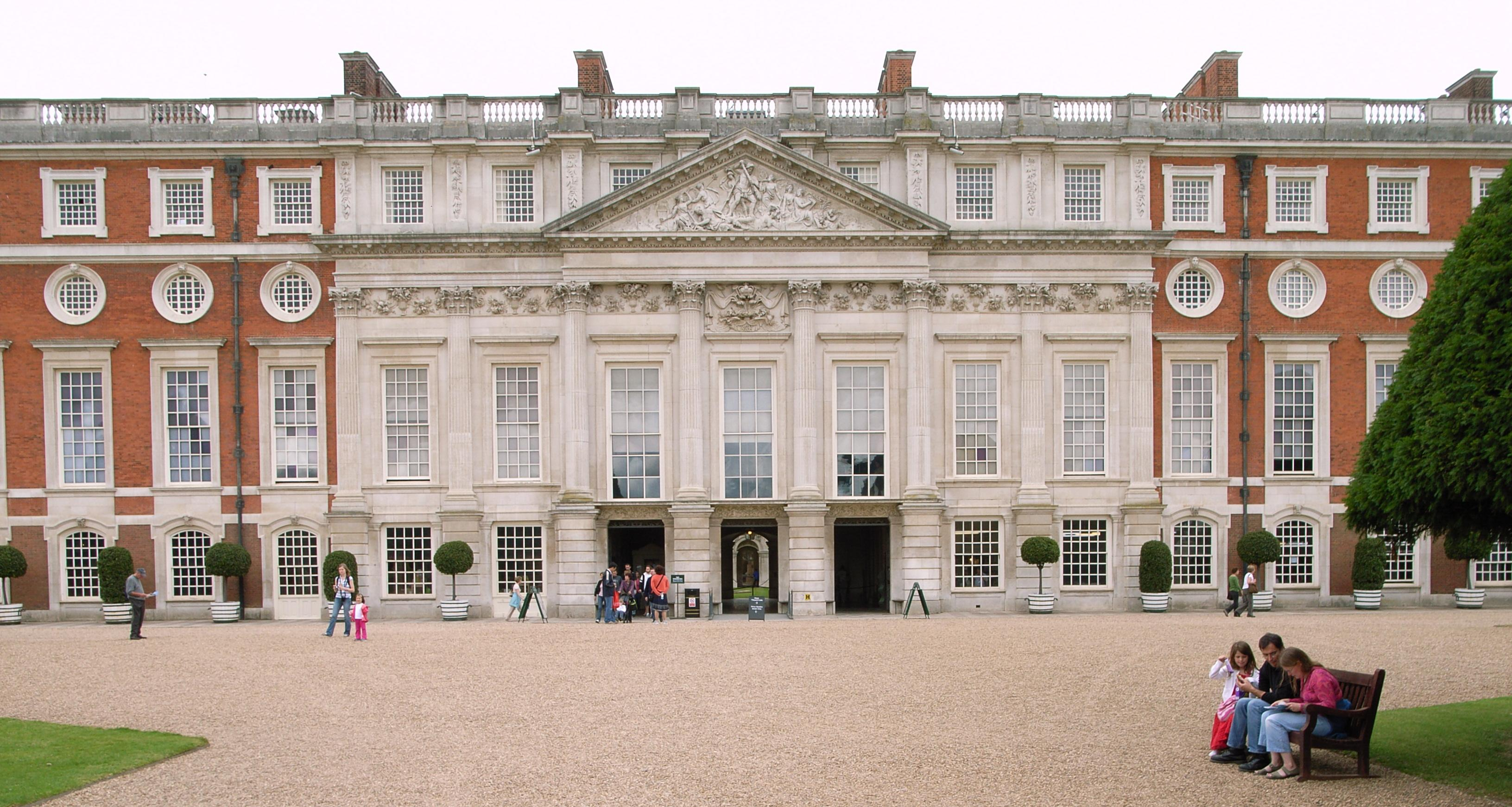
Hampton Court Palace - East Front by Steve Cadman.

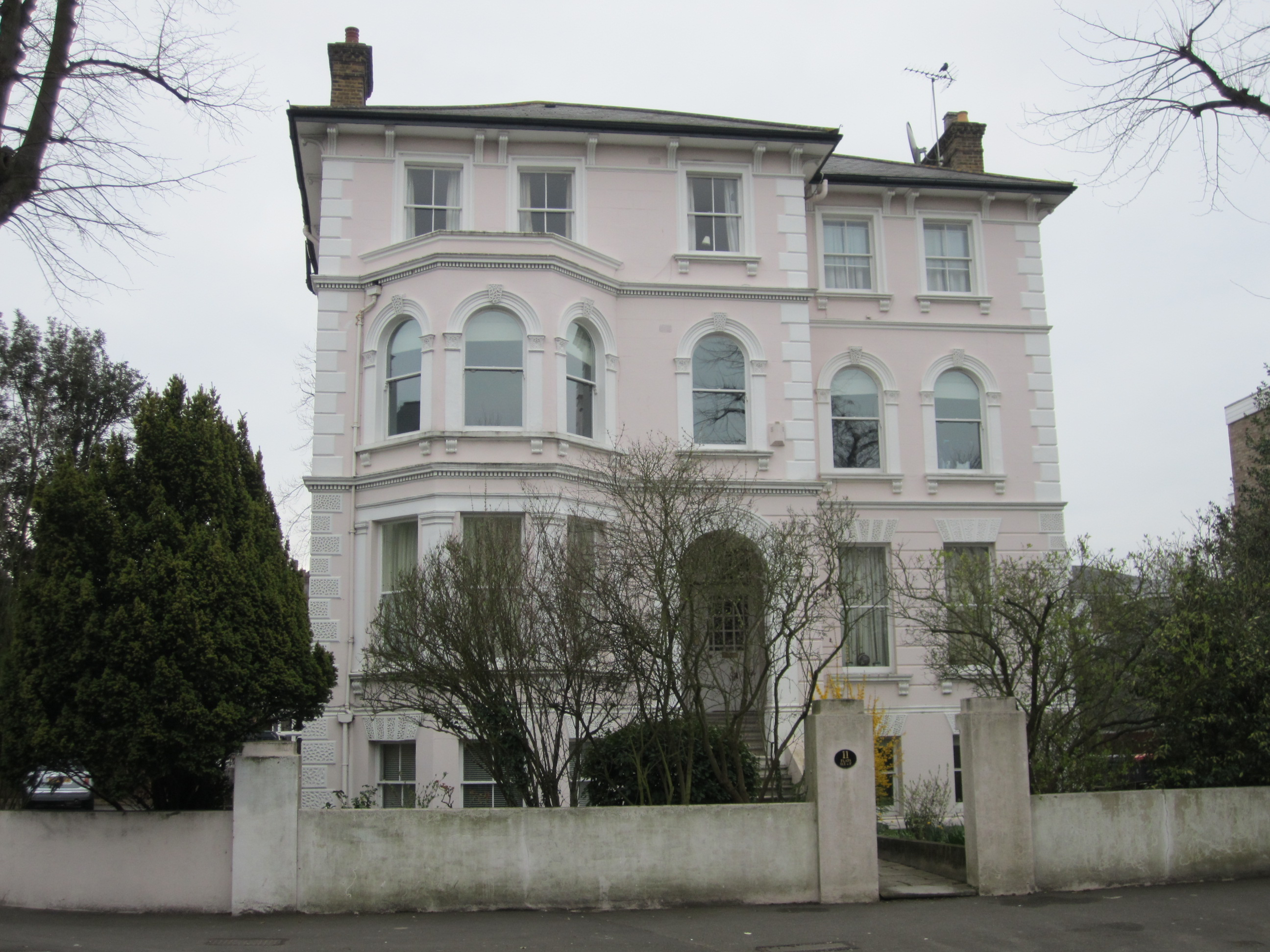
The last of eleven houses built in Palace Road by William Woods

This was the most prestigious of all the roads in the Woods development. It is very wide - there would be room to turn a horse-drawn carriage - and the aerial picture shows eleven mansions of similar design, well spaced and with large gardens. The road affords a view of the East Front of Hampton Court Palace and is directly in line with the Long Water.

Of the mansions, only one remains, no. 11, at the Surbiton Crescent end. It is now divided into flats. Westergate House, on Portsmouth Road at the corner of Palace Road, survived until the late 20th century, but has now been replaced by a block of flats.

In the middle of the north side of the road a long-established motor repair business continues unobtrusively.

=== Uxbridge Road ===
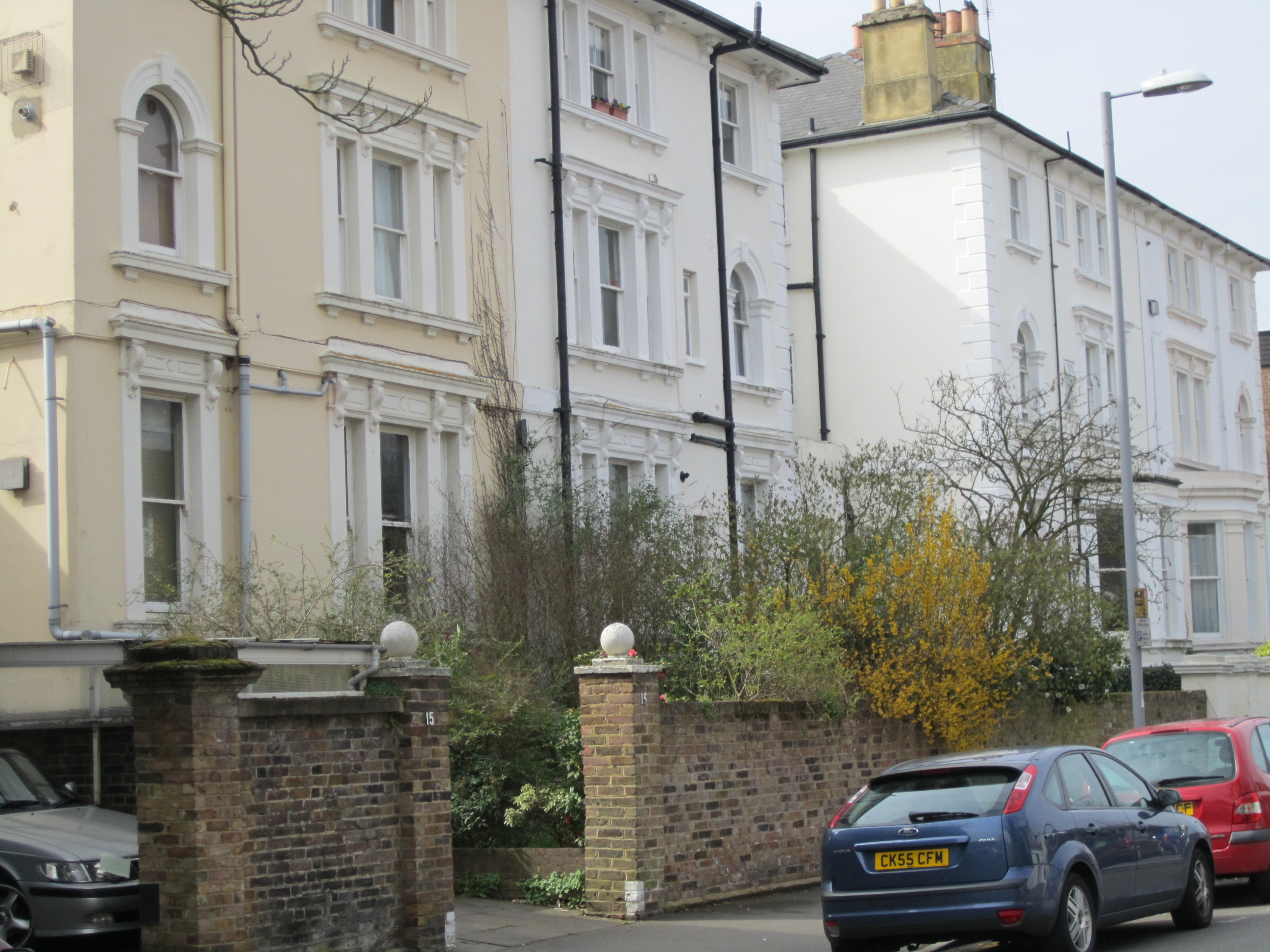
Houses on the south side of Uxbridge Road

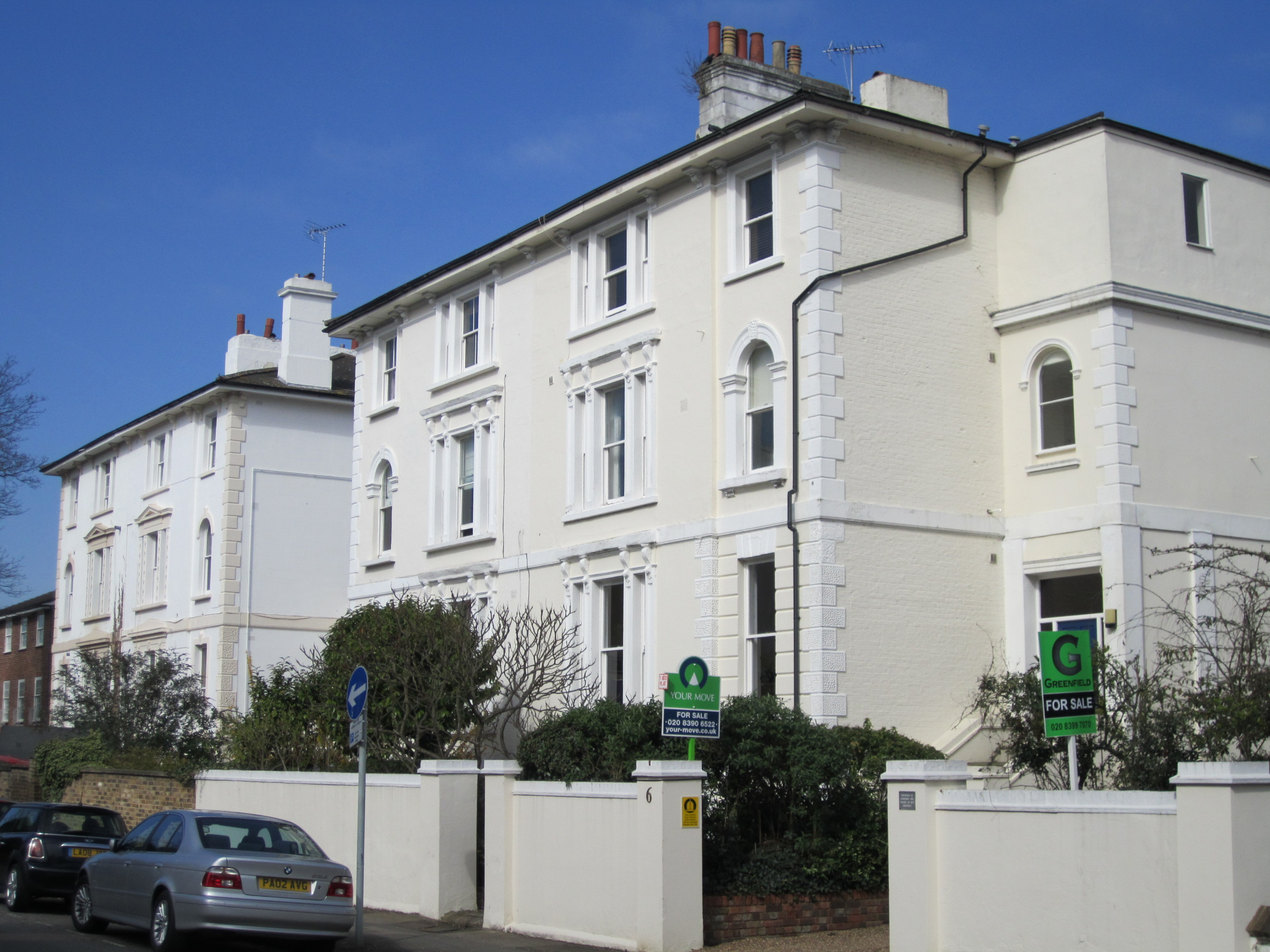
The four Woods period houses on the north side of Uxbridge Road

Most roads with this name in and around western Greater London lead to the ancient market town of Uxbridge in Middlesex, but this one is named after the two Earls of Uxbridge who owned Surbiton Place.

Some of the Victorian buildings have been replaced, mainly with blocks of flats, but so many remain that the whole of the south side of the road and part of the north side are included in Cadogan Road Conservation Area.

Near the Portsmouth Road end of the south side there is an orthodox synagogue. There was formerly a car showroom almost directly opposite, but this has been replaced by houses.

=== Surbiton Hall Close ===
This is a cul-de-sac of 1930s semi-detached houses built on land which had remained with Surbiton Hall after most of the park was sold to William Woods.

=== Home Park Walk ===
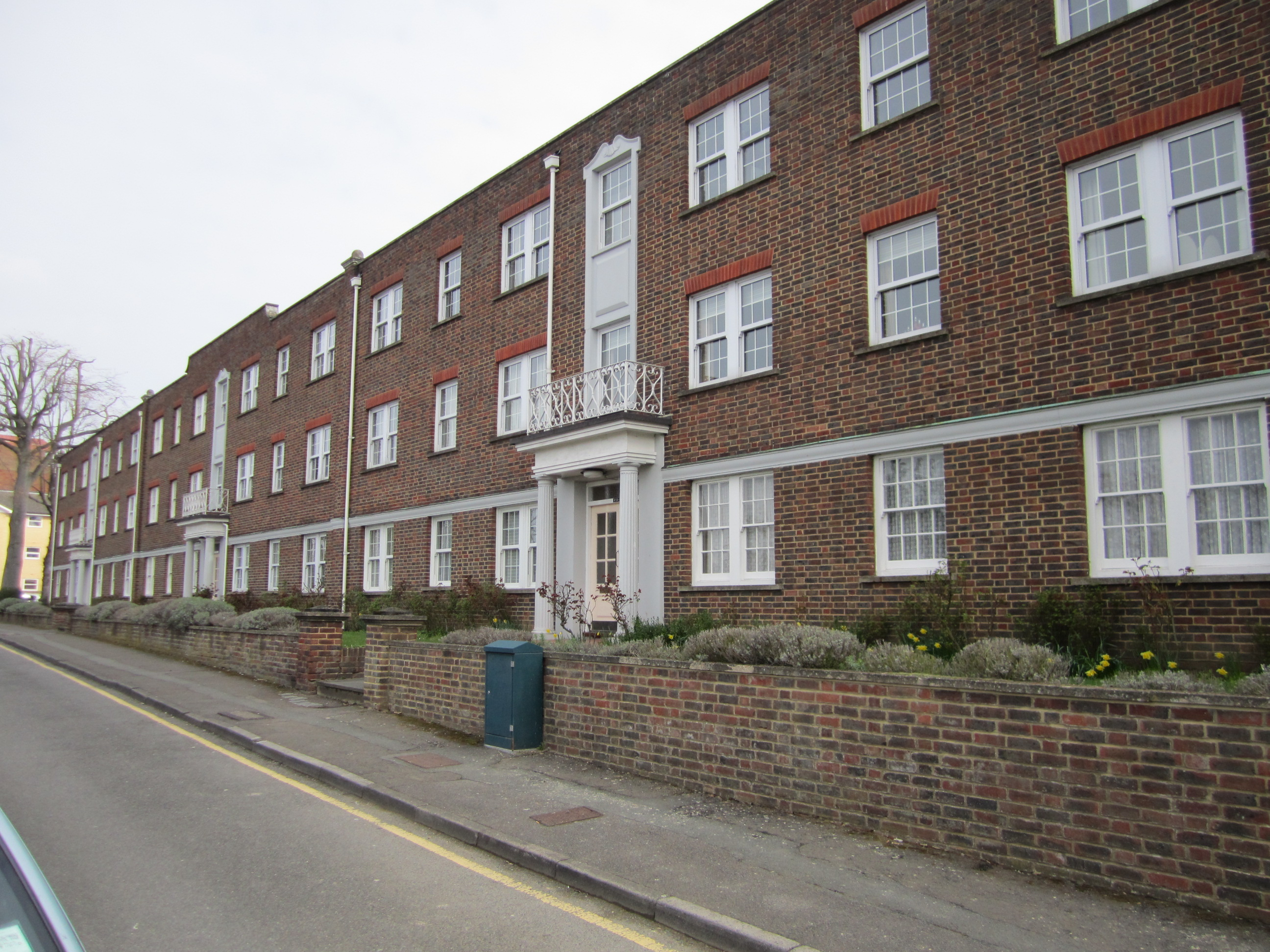
Flats in Home Park Walk

During the Second World War a V-1 flying bomb destroyed houses in Portsmouth Road between the junctions with Palace Road and Uxbridge Road.

After the war this new road was created and named after Hampton Court Home Park, which is just across the river.

For decades there was a low-rise petrol station, designed to be unobtrusive, between the west side and Portsmouth Road. This was derelict for some years, but the space is now used by a hand car wash business.

The whole of the east side is taken up by a terrace of flats built in a dignified style which, while different from that of the Victorian buildings, makes a positive contribution to the overall appearance of the area.

=== Haylett Gardens ===
This is a post-war development of mixed housing on land bounded by Anglesea Road, Surbiton Crescent and Palace Road.

=== Belgravia Mews ===
This double cul-de-sac is part of a dense development of 1960s-style town houses between Palace Road and Uxbridge Road, a classic example of post-war infill.

=== Raphael Close ===
Named after Alexander Raphael, who lived in Surbiton Place before the Woods estate was built, this is a small, secluded development of houses in the late 20th/early 21st century style.

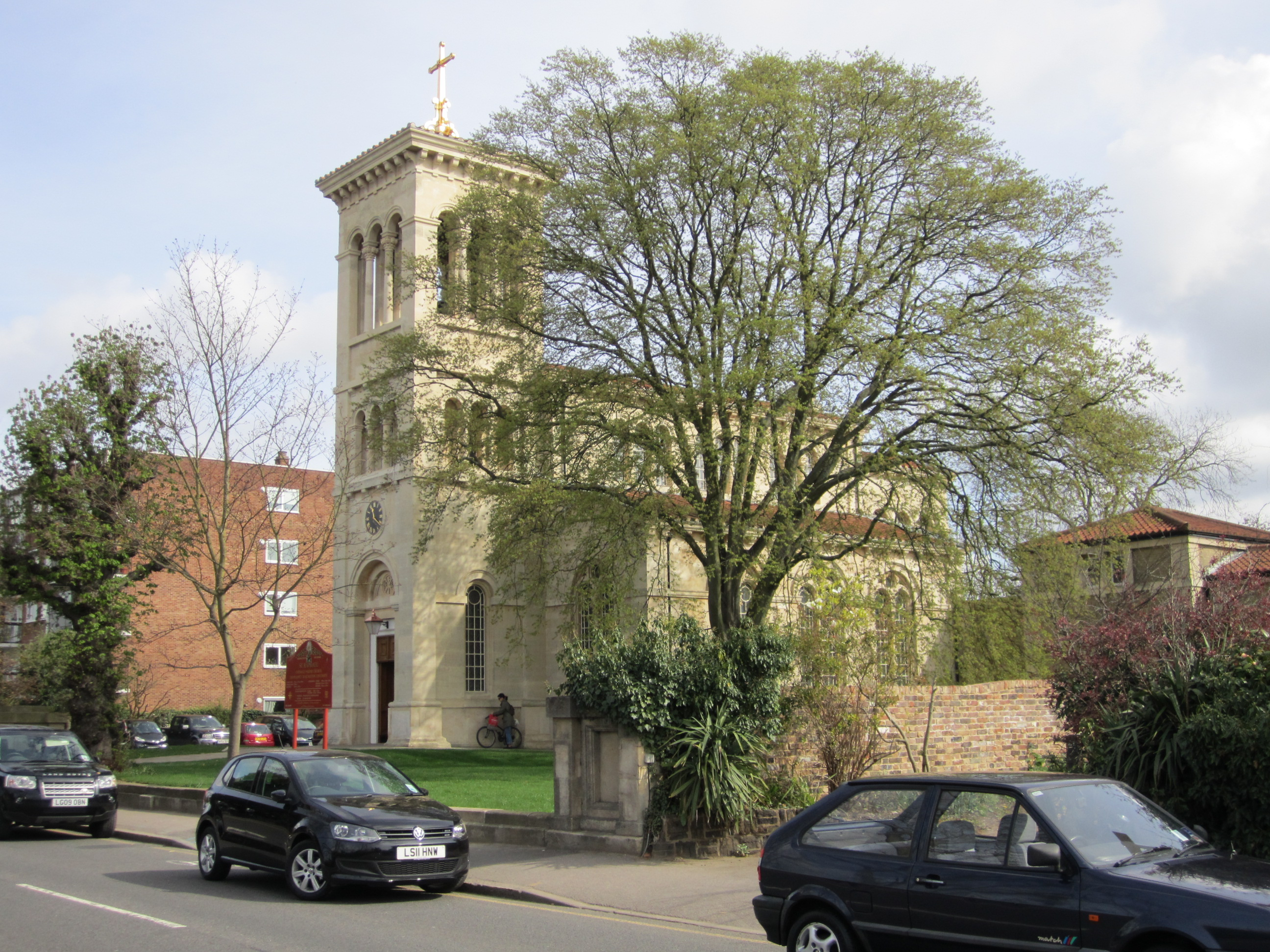
Another view of St Raphael's Church. This is the south side as seen from Portsmouth Road

== Oral traditions ==
In the 1960s there were people living in Surbiton Park who had memories of the area as it was in the late 19th century. Stories were told about various events in the history of the area.

The purpose of this section is to assess the probability of the truth of some of these traditions.

=== The S-shaped strip ===
There had been a plan to build a new road south of Uxbridge Road, but this scheme was abandoned when Catherine Road, Surbiton was built, and the land was sold off in small plots.

This is essentially true, but the timing of the various elements of the story needs to be understood.

On maps of several different periods it is possible to see a strip of land with a gentle reverse curve, running roughly west to east immediately south of Surbiton Park.

In his original plan for his Surbiton development, Thomas Pooley showed a road on this strip which would give access to the Portsmouth Road. The junction would not have been directly opposite the end of the present Claremont Road, because the park of Surbiton Place was in the way and the strip was the nearest available land.

Pooley got into financial difficulties and his scheme was never completed. Once William Woods had built Uxbridge Road, there was a more direct route to the main road and the river. The building of Catherine Road finally put paid to the idea of a road on the strip.

Therefore, the strip was sold off in relatively small plots. The predecessor of the present Ravenside was built on Portsmouth Road, and the fancifully named Eastfield was built in Maple Road on the site now occupied by Home Court.

The remainder of the land was sold to the owners of houses in Uxbridge Road to lengthen their gardens. The land was in Surbiton and it was part of the folklore that an additional amount of rates was paid to Kingston and passed on to Surbiton, until the amalgamation of 1965 brought an end to this anomaly.

The strip can still be discerned on the Ordnance Survey 1:1,250 map (the "50in. map") and is seen south of Uxbridge Road on the map at the start of the original park section.

=== The tram route ===
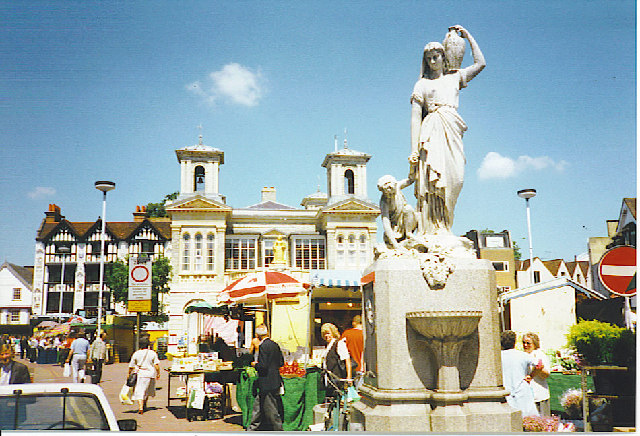
Kingston Market Place with memorial to Henry Shrubsole. Photo: Colin Smith.

The tramway was routed via Surbiton Crescent as a result of pressure from the occupant of Surbiton Hall.

This could very well be true. Mrs Shrubsole was a member of a prominent family in Kingston, one of whom, Henry, served as mayor three times. No doubt she had the ear of councillors.

Examination of the 50in. map shows that the tramway company would have preferred to take the route via the gentler turn into Maple Road and the very gentle turn into Claremont Road.

However, Mrs Shrubsole would not have wanted to have clanking, screeching trams passing in front of her home every few minutes.

=== Alignment of houses ===
The 1930s houses in Surbiton Road were built at an angle to the road in order to reflect the orientation of Surbiton Hall.

If this was ever a stated aim, it was a case of making a virtue out of necessity.

The 50in. map shows that the boundaries of the curtilages are parallel to the existing wall at the northern end of the site, the one with the plaque mentioned in the History section above. Since the houses are semi-detached, it is a practical necessity for the side walls to be parallel to the curtilage boundaries.

In addition, the arrangement allows the house at the corner, 157, Maple Road, to have a reasonably sized rear garden.

== Sources ==
These include:

- June Sampson: All Change; Kingston, Surbiton & New Malden in the 19th Century. (News Origin, Kingston, 1985, rev. 1991). (Sampson.)
- Richard Statham: Surbiton Past. (Phillimore, Chichester, 1996).
- Anne McCormack: Kingston upon Thames; A Pictorial History. (Phillimore, Chichester, 1989).
- Shaan Butters: The Book of Kingston. (Baron Birch, 1995).
- John Pink: Two Roads in Victorian Surbiton Glimpsed from the Census Returns 1861-1891. (JRP, Surbiton, 1996).
- June Sampson: Kingston and Surbiton; Old & New. (Marine Day, Surbiton, 1992). (Sampson O&N.)
- The National Archives website. (For legal documents.)
