= Henry Paget, 2nd Earl of Uxbridge =

British nobleman

Henry Paget, 2nd Earl of Uxbridge (22 January 1719 – 16 November 1769) was a British nobleman, styled Lord Paget from 1742 to 1743.

The only son of Thomas Paget, Lord Paget, and his wife Lady Elizabeth, he was commissioned a cornet in the 1st (Royal) Regiment of Dragoons on 23 April 1742, shortly after the death of his father. He succeeded his grandfather as Earl of Uxbridge in 1743. He was appointed a deputy lieutenant for Staffordshire on 7 July 1757, and died, unmarried, on 16 November 1769. He was buried on 24 November at West Drayton.

Peerage of England
Preceded by Henry Paget	Baron Paget; 1743–1769	Succeeded by Henry Bayly
Peerage of Great Britain
Preceded by Henry Paget	Earl of Uxbridge; 1743–1769	Extinct
