= Nicholas Bayly (Newry MP) =

Irish landowner and politician

Member of Parliament for Newry
- In office 1661-1666

Personal details
- Born: Before 1631
- Children: Edward Bayly
- Parent: Lewis Bayly (father)
- Relatives: Henry Bagenal (grandfather)

Nicholas Bayly (born before 1631), was an Irish landowner and Member of Parliament.

Bayly was the son of Lewis Bayly, Bishop of Bangor, and Anne, daughter of Sir Henry Bagenal. He was a member of the Irish House of Commons for Newry between 1661 and 1666 and also served as Governor of the Aran Islands.

Bayly's son Edward was created a Baronet in 1730 and was the great-grandfather of Henry Paget, 1st Marquess of Anglesey, hero of the Battle of Waterloo.

== See also ==
- Marquess of Anglesey
