= Nicholas Bayly (Anglesey MP) =

British soldier and Member of Parliament

Member of Parliament for Anglesey
- In office 1784–1790

Personal details
- Born: 1749
- Died: 7 June 1812 (aged 64–65)
- Spouse: Frances Nettlefold (m. 1776)
- Children: 3+, including Henry
- Parent: Nicholas Bayly (father)
- Relatives: Henry Bayly-Paget (brother); Henry Paget (nephew); William Paget (nephew)
- Military career
- Rank: Colonel
- Unit: 1st Foot Guards
- Commands: Royal West Middlesex Militia

Colonel Nicholas Bayly (1749 – 7 June 1812) was a British soldier and Member of Parliament.

== Background ==
Born in 1749, Bayly was the third son of Sir Nicholas Bayly, 2nd Baronet, and Caroline, daughter of Brigadier-General Thomas Paget. He was the younger brother of Henry Bayly-Paget, 1st Earl of Uxbridge, and the uncle of Henry Paget, 1st Marquess of Anglesey. The family seat was Plas Newydd.

== Military and political career ==
Bayly was a Lieutenant-Colonel in the 1st Foot Guards and after he had begun his political career he was appointed Colonel of the part-time Royal West Middlesex Militia (a regiment in which several of his family also served) on 15 April 1788. He was returned to parliament for Anglesey in 1784, a seat he held until 1790. He was succeeded as MP by his nephew William Paget.

== Family ==
Bayly married Frances/Fanny (née Nettlefold) on 14 April 1776. He died in June 1812. Their second son was Gen. Sir Henry Bayly. Another son, Nicholas Bayly (1770-1823), had a controversial military career and settled in Australia. His daughter Louisa Augusta, who was born on 18 March 1779, married Sir Edward Perrott on 8 May 1810.

Parliament of Great Britain
Preceded by The Viscount Bulkeley	Member of Parliament for Anglesey; 1784–1790	Succeeded by Hon. William Paget
