= Sir Nicholas Bayly, 2nd Baronet =

British landowner and Member of Parliament

Sir Nicholas Bayly Bt
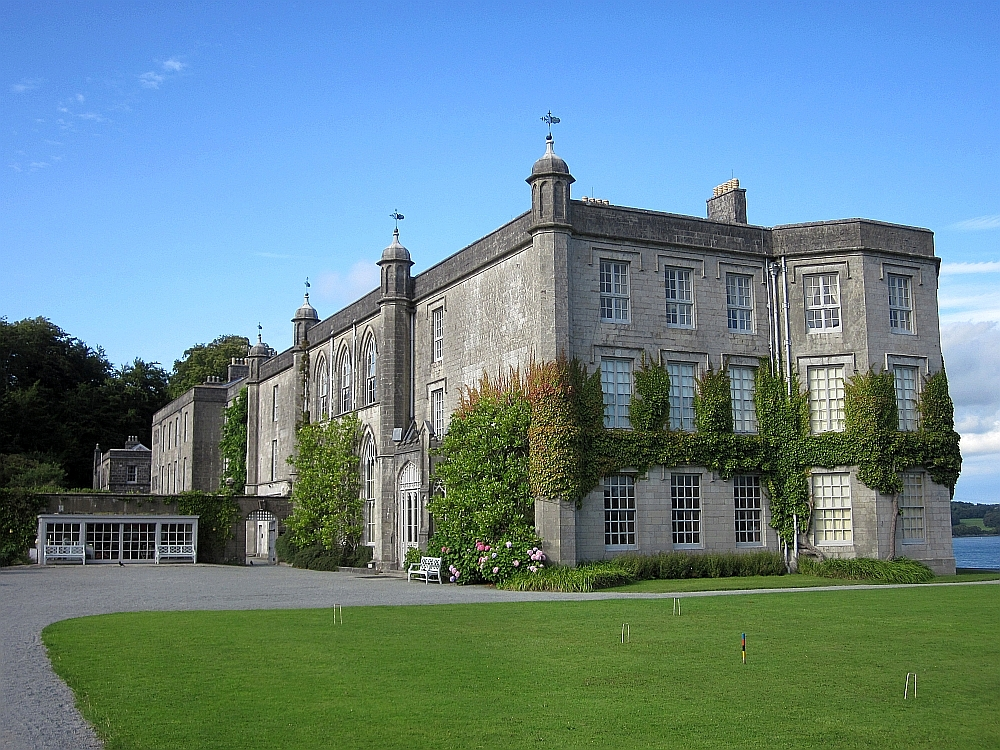
- Plas Newydd, seat of the Bayly family

Lord Lieutenant of Anglesey
- In office 25 November 1761 – 1 August 1782
- Monarch: George III
- Preceded by: The Earl of Cholmondeley
- Succeeded by: The Earl of Uxbridge

Personal details
- Born: 1709
- Died: 9 December 1782
- Spouse(s): (1) Caroline Paget (d. 1766) (2) Anne Hunter (d. 1818)
- Children: 12
- Parent(s): Sir Edward Bayly, 1st Baronet; Dorothy Lambart
- Education: Trinity College, Dublin

Sir Nicholas Bayly, 2nd Baronet (1709 – 9 December 1782), was a British landowner and Member of Parliament.

== Background and education ==
Bayly was the eldest son of Sir Edward Bayly, 1st Baronet, and Dorothy, daughter of the Hon. Oliver Lambart. He was educated at Trinity College, Dublin. He succeeded his father as second Baronet in 1741, inheriting Plas Newydd near Llanfairpwllgwyngyll, Anglesey.

== Political career ==
Bayly was returned to Parliament for Anglesey in 1734, a seat he held until 1741, and again between 1747 and 1761 and 1770 and 1774. In 1761 he was appointed Lord Lieutenant of Anglesey, which he remained until shortly before his death in 1782.

== Family ==
Arms of Bayly Baronets, of Plas Newydd: Azure nine estoiles, three, three, two, and one, argent.

Bayly married firstly Caroline Paget, daughter of Brigadier General Thomas Paget (died 1741), Governor of Menorca, and Mary Whitcombe, in 1737. They had six sons and five daughters:

1. Edward, died unmarried on 30 June 1753
2. Henry (18 June 1744 – 13 March 1812), who succeeded to the baronetcy
3. Nicholas Bayly, born 1749, who died on 7 June 1812, leaving a widow and ten children.
4. Thomas, died as an infant
5. Brownlow, died as an infant
6. Paget Bayly, who was born on 25 June 1753 and died on 14 November 1804. He rose to Captain in the Royal Navy. On 25 August 1791 he married Martha Colepepper and had issue: an only son, who died 1 November 1801; Amelia Paget, born 1792; and Rosa Maria, born 1797, who on 15 October 1812 married George Adolphus Coleman.
7. Mary, who died 20 October 1790, having married Stephen Metcalfe, of Sereby, Lincolnshire
8. Dorothy, who died 24 September 1764, having married the Hon. George Forbes.
9. Caroline, died in 1786, unmarried
10. Gertrude, died in 1761, unmarried
11. Louisa, born 4 December 1750, and married 6 April 1789 Captain Thomas Poplett, RN.

After his first wife's death on 7 February 1766, Bayly married secondly Anne (née Hunter). They had a son Lewis Bayly in 1775, Lewis later added the surname Wallis and became a General in the Army. Bayly died in December 1782 and was succeeded in the baronetcy by his eldest son from his first marriage, Henry, who had already succeeded as 10th Baron Paget through his mother in 1769 and was later created Earl of Uxbridge. He was the father of Henry Paget, 1st Marquess of Anglesey, hero of the Battle of Waterloo. Lady Bayly died in May 1818.

Parliament of Great Britain
Preceded by Hugh Williams	Member of Parliament for Anglesey; 1734–1741	Succeeded by John Owen
Preceded by John Owen	Member of Parliament for Anglesey; 1747–1761	Succeeded by Owen Meyrick
Preceded by The Viscount Bulkeley	Member of Parliament for Anglesey; 1770–1774	Succeeded by Nicholas Bayly
Honorary titles
Preceded by Owen Meyrick	Custos Rotulorum of Anglesey; 1759–1782	Succeeded by The Earl of Uxbridge
Preceded by The Earl of Cholmondeley	Lord Lieutenant of Anglesey; 1761–1782	Succeeded by The Earl of Uxbridge
Baronetage of Ireland
Preceded by Edward Bayly	Baronet (of Plas Newydd and Mount Bagenall); 1741 – 1782	Succeeded by Henry Paget
