= Newry (Parliament of Ireland constituency) =

Pre-1801 Irish constituency

Coordinates: 54.178°N 6.336°W

- Former borough constituency for the Irish House of Commons
- County: County Armagh and County Down
- Borough: Newry

–1801
- Seats: 2
- Replaced by: Newry (UKHC)

Newry was a borough constituency of the town of Newry in the Irish House of Commons until 1800. After the Acts of Union 1800, the town was represented by one MP in the United Kingdom House of Commons.

== Members of Parliament ==
- 1613–1615 Arthur Bassett and John Leigh
- 1634–1645 Arthur Terringham (Tyringham) and Robert Loftus
- 1639–1642 Sir Toby Poyntz and William Reading (both resigned and replaced 1641 by Thomas Stanihurst (expelled 1642)
- 1661–1666 Trevor Lloyd and Nicholas Bayly

=== 1689–1801 ===
Election	First MP	Second MP
1689	Rowland White	Rowland Savage
1692	Frederick Porter	Sir John Trevor
1695	Frederick Porter	Robert Echlin
1703	Adam Swift	Robert Echlin
1705	Edward Bayly	Robert Echlin
1707	Edward Bayly	Hans Hamilton
1715	Robert Clements	Hans Hamilton
1723	James Hamilton	Hans Hamilton
1727	Robert Needham	Robert Ross
1751	Robert Needham	Robert Scott
1753	Robert Needham	Robert Scott
1761	George Needham	Roger Hall
1767	William Nedham	Roger Hall
1768	William Nedham	Robert Scott
1774	William Nedham	Edward Corry
1776	Robert Ross	Isaac Corry
1799	John Moore	Isaac Corry
1801	Succeeded by Westminster constituency Newry	
