= Henry Paget, 1st Earl of Uxbridge (second creation) =

British peer (1744–1812)

The Right Honourable The Earl of Uxbridge
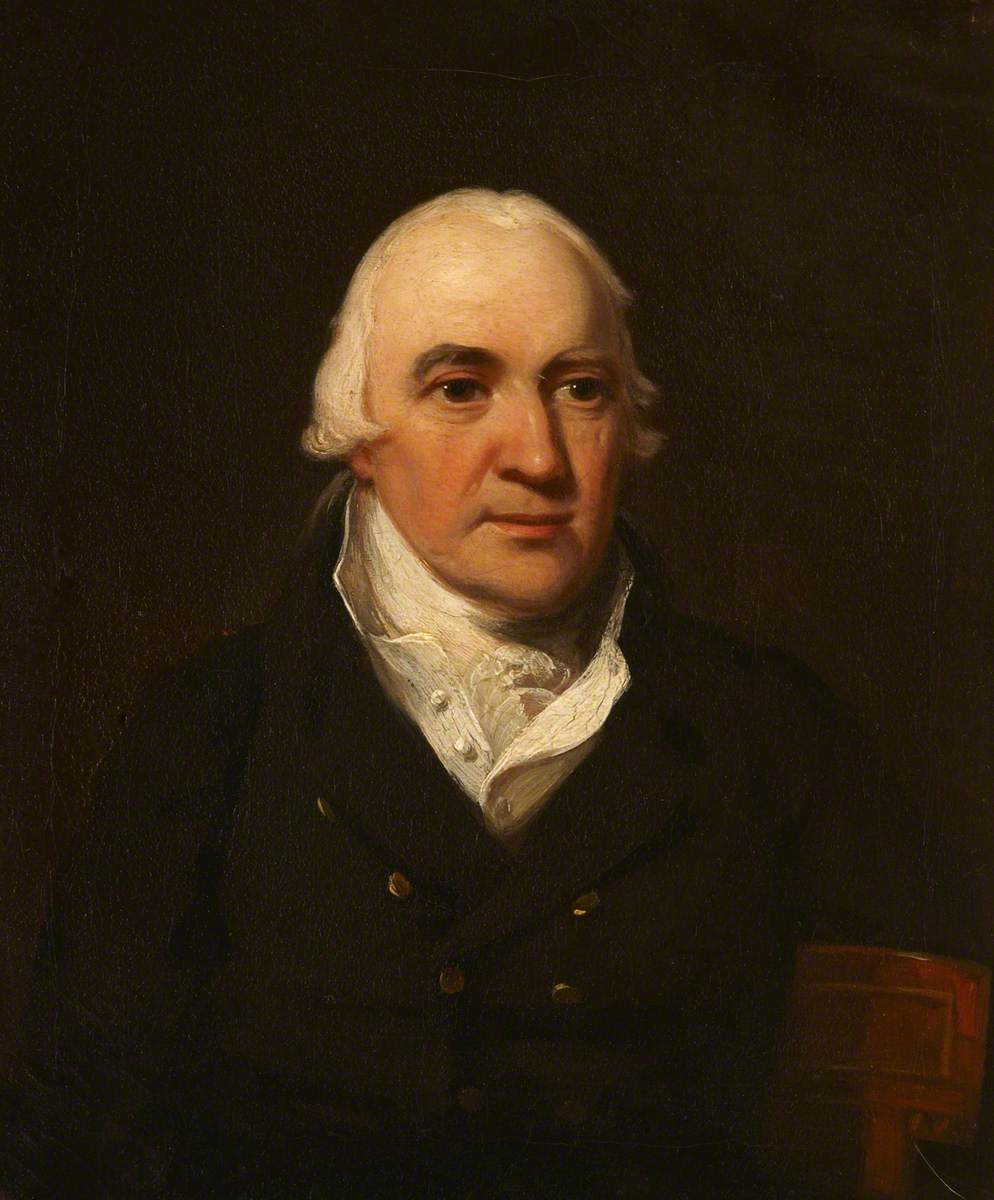
- Portrait of Lord Uxbridge, by George Romney, 1811

Lord Lieutenant of Staffordshire
- In office 1801–1812
- Preceded by: Earl Gower
- Succeeded by: The Earl Talbot

Lord Lieutenant of Anglesey
- In office 1782–1812
- Preceded by: Sir Nicholas Bayly, Bt
- Succeeded by: The Earl of Uxbridge

Personal details
- Born: Henry Bayly; 18 June 1744
- Died: 13 March 1812 (aged 67)
- Spouse: Jane Champagné (m. 1767)
- Children: 12
- Parent(s): Sir Nicholas Bayly, 2nd Baronet; Caroline Paget

Henry Bayly-Paget, 1st Earl of Uxbridge (18 June 1744 – 13 March 1812), known as Henry Bayly until 1769 and as Lord Paget between 1769 and 1784, was a British peer.

== Early life ==
Born Henry Bayly, Uxbridge was the eldest son of Sir Nicholas Bayly, 2nd Baronet, of Plas Newydd in Anglesey, by his wife Caroline Paget, daughter of Brigadier-General Thomas Paget and a great-granddaughter of William Paget, 5th Baron Paget. He succeeded as 10th Baron Paget in 1769 on the death of his mother's second cousin, Henry Paget, 2nd Earl of Uxbridge. By Royal Licence on 29 January 1770, he took the name of Paget in lieu of Bayly. In 1782 he succeeded his father as 3rd Baronet.

== Career ==
Paget was commissioned colonel of the newly raised Staffordshire Militia on 22 April 1776 during the War of American Independence. He resigned in 1781 but was re-appointed in 1783, after the war had ended and the regiment was disembodied. He was still commanding the regiment when it was re-embodied for the French Revolutionary War, and remained so until his death.

Uxbridge became Lord Lieutenant of Anglesey in 1782. On 19 May 1784, he was created Earl of Uxbridge, in the County of Middlesex. He was also Lord Lieutenant of Staffordshire between 1801 and 1812, Constable of Caernarfon Castle, Ranger of the Forest of Snowdon, Steward of Bardney, and Vice-Admiral of North Wales.

== Marriage and issue ==
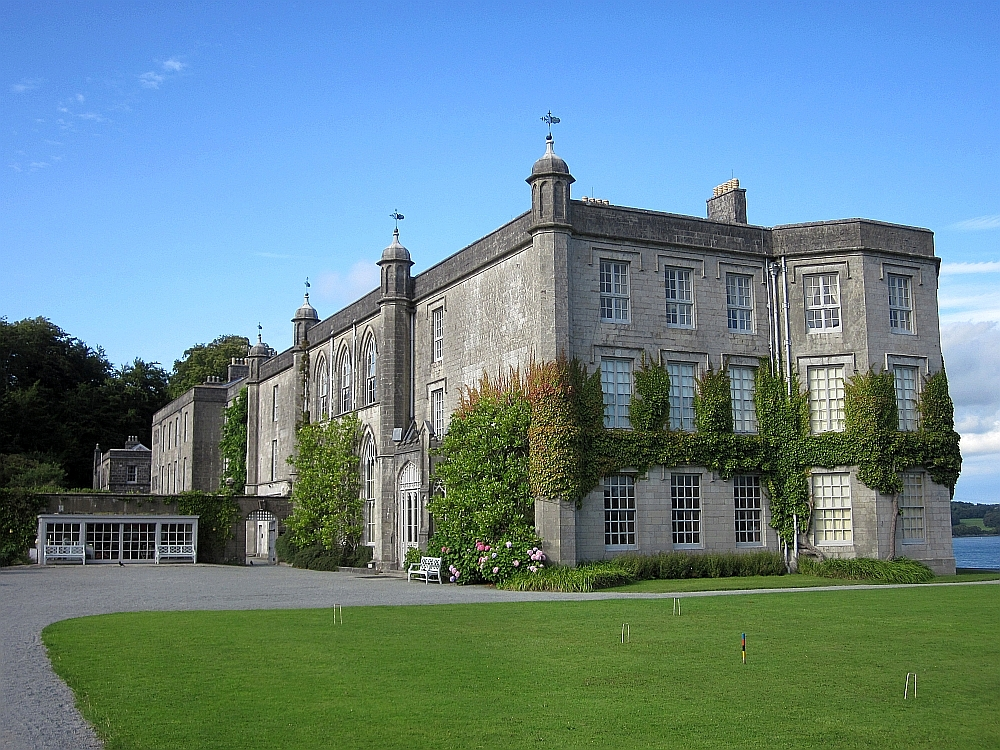
Plas Newydd, seat of the Bayly (and Bayley-Paget) family

In 1767 Lord Uxbridge married Jane, daughter of the Very Reverend Arthur Champagné, Dean of Clonmacnoise, a descendant of a well-known Huguenot family which had settled in Ireland, and his wife Jane Forbes. They had twelve children:

- Field Marshal Henry William Paget, 1st Marquess of Anglesey (1768–1854), married Lady Caroline Villiers, a daughter of George Villiers, 4th Earl of Jersey. They are the great-great-great-great-grandparents of Diana, Princess of Wales. They divorced in 1810 and she married George Campbell, 6th Duke of Argyll.
- Captain Hon. William Paget (1769–1794), an MP who died unmarried.
- Sir Arthur Paget (1771–1840), married Lady Augusta Parker, the daughter of John Fane, 10th Earl of Westmorland and former wife of John Parker, 1st Earl of Morley, in 1809
- Lady Caroline Paget (6 February 1773 – 9 July 1847), married Hon. John Capell, son of William Capell, 4th Earl of Essex
- Lady Jane Paget (1774–1842), married George Stewart, 8th Earl of Galloway. They are the great-great-grandparents of Winston Churchill.
- General Hon. Sir Edward Paget (1775–1849), married Hon. Frances Bagot, third daughter of William Bagot, 1st Baron Bagot and Hon. Elizabeth St John (eldest daughter of John St John, 2nd Viscount St John), in 1805. After her death in 1806, he married Lady Harriet Legge, third daughter of George Legge, 3rd Earl of Dartmouth.
- Lady Louisa Paget (22 March 1777 – 28 April 1825), married, firstly, Lt.-Gen. Sir James Erskine, Bt.; and, secondly, Gen. Sir George Murray.
- Vice-Admiral Sir Charles Paget (1778–1839), married Elizabeth Monck, daughter and co-heiress of Henry Monck, in 1805.
- Hon. Berkeley Thomas Paget (1780–1842), married Sophia Bucknall, only surviving child of Hon. William Bucknall (second son of James Grimston, 2nd Viscount Grimston), in 1804
- Lady Charlotte Paget (26 October 1781 – 26 January 1817), married John Cole, 2nd Earl of Enniskillen
- Lady Mary Paget (9 April 1783 – 29 April 1835), married Thomas Graves, 2nd Baron Graves
- Hon. Brownlow "Charles" Paget (19 March 1787 – May 1797), died young

Lord Uxbridge died in March 1812, aged 67, and was succeeded in the earldom by his eldest son Henry, who gained fame at the Battle of Waterloo and was created Marquess of Anglesey. The Countess of Uxbridge died in March 1817, aged seventy.

He owned Beaudesert, Cannock Chase in the 18th century, in which he hired James Wyatt to remodel the interior of the hall in 1771-72.

In 1809, Lord Uxbridge bought Surbiton Place, just to the south of Kingston upon Thames. When the Surbiton Park estate was built on its grounds in the 1850s, a street was named Uxbridge Road in honour of him and his heir Henry, who inherited it.

Honorary titles
Preceded by Sir Nicholas Bayly, Bt	Lord Lieutenant of Anglesey; 1782–1812	Succeeded by The Earl of Uxbridge
Vacant Title last held by George Rice	Vice-Admiral of Carmarthenshire; 1790–1812	Succeeded by The Earl of Uxbridge
Vacant Title last held by Sir Hugh Owen, Bt	Vice-Admiral of North Wales; 1790–1812	Succeeded by The Earl of Uxbridge
Vacant Title last held by Sir Hugh Owen, Bt	Vice-Admiral of Pembrokeshire; 1790–1812	Succeeded by John Owen
Preceded by Earl Gower	Lord Lieutenant of Staffordshire; 1801–1812	Succeeded by The Earl Talbot
Peerage of England
Preceded by Henry Paget	Baron Paget; 1769–1812	Succeeded by Henry William Paget
Baronetage of Ireland
Preceded by Nicholas Bayly	Baronet (of Plas Newydd); 1782–1812	Succeeded by Henry William Paget
Peerage of Great Britain
New creation	Earl of Uxbridge; 2nd creation 1784–1812	Succeeded by Henry William Paget
