= 1829 in literature =

This article contains information about the literary events and publications of 1829.

== Events ==
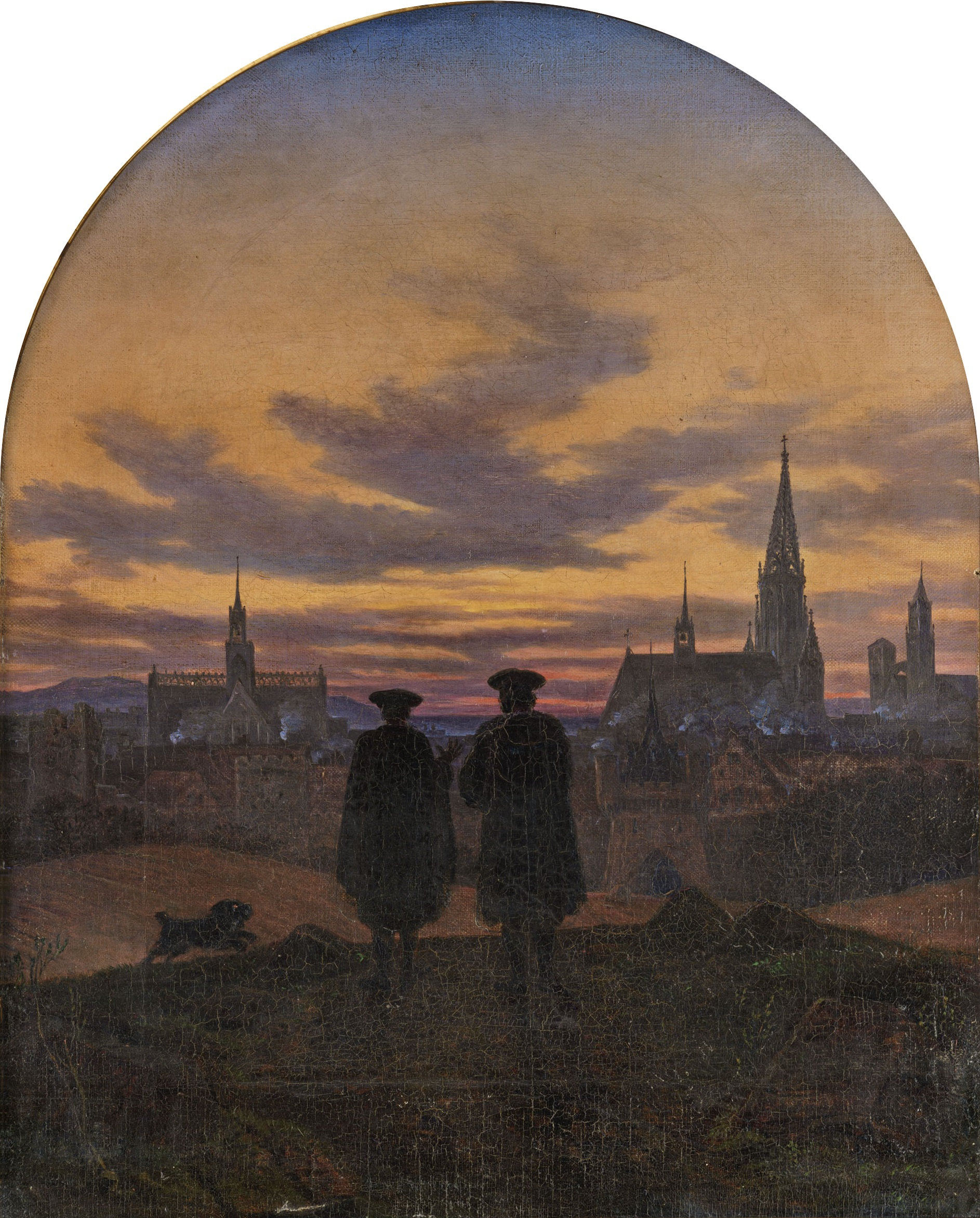
Dusk. On Goethe's Faust (1837) by Carl Gustav Carus

- January 26 – The first performance of Douglas Jerrold's comic nautical melodrama Black-Eyed Susan; or, All in the Downs is held at the Surrey Theatre in Lambeth, London. It will run for a new record of well over 150 performances.
- January 29 – The first complete performance of Goethe's Faust: The First Part of the Tragedy (1808), adapted by August Klingemann, in Braunschweig.
- September – The narrative of George Eliot's novel Middlemarch (1871–1872) opens.
- October 29 – The English actress Fanny Kemble makes her stage debut as Juliet in Shakespeare's Romeo and Juliet, at her father's Theatre Royal, Covent Garden in London.
- December — John Neal publishes the final issue of The Yankee literary journal.
- unknown dates
  - Louis Braille invents a new alphabet and embossed printing that allows the blind to read.
  - The Raczyński Library in Poznań is opened to the public.

== New books ==
=== Fiction ===
- Edward Bulwer-Lytton – Devereux
- Honoré de Balzac – Les Chouans
- Steen Steensen Blicher – The Rector of Veilbye (Præsten i Vejlbye)
- William Nugent Glascock – Sailors and Saints, or Matrimonial Manœuvres
- Johann Wolfgang von Goethe – Wilhelm Meister's Journeyman Years, or The Renunciants (Wilhelm Meisters Wanderjahre, oder Die Entsagenden)
- Catherine Gore – Romances of Real Life
- Gerald Griffin – The Collegians
- Victor Hugo – The Last Day of a Condemned Man (Le Dernier Jour d'un condamné)
- Washington Irving – Chronicle of the Conquest of Granada
- George Payne Rainsford James – Richelieu
- Prosper Mérimée – A Chronicle of the Reign of Charles IX
- Julia Pardoe – Lord Morcar of Hereward
- Thomas Love Peacock (anonymously) – The Misfortunes of Elphin
- Walter Scott (anonymously) – Anne of Geierstein
- Martin Archer Shee – Oldcourt
- Horace Smith – The New Forest

=== Children ===
- Frederick Marryat – The Naval Officer, or Scenes in the Life and Adventures of Frank Mildmay

=== Drama ===
- Jacques-François Ancelot – Elizabeth of England
- Johann Wolfgang von Goethe – Faust (performed)
- Victor Hugo – Marion Delorme
- Douglas William Jerrold – Black-Eyed Susan
- John Augustus Stone – Metamora; or, The Last of the Wampanoags

=== Poetry ===
- Edgar Allan Poe – Al Aaraaf, Tamerlane and Other Poems
- Alfred Tennyson – Timbuctoo
- Henrik Wergeland
  - Digte, første Ring (Poems, first circle)
  - Skabelsen, Mennesket og Messias (Creation, Man and the Messiah)

=== Non-fiction ===
- Hans Christian Andersen – A Journey on Foot from Holmen's Canal to the East Point of Amager (Fodrejse fra Holmens Canal til Østpynten af Amager i Aarene 1828 og 1829)
- Thomas Carlyle – Signs of the Times
- William Cobbett
  - The English Gardener
  - Advice to Young Men
- Samuel Taylor Coleridge – On the Constitution of Church and State
- Encyclopedia Americana, vol. 1 (1st edition)
- Washington Irving – A Chronicle of the Conquest of Granada
- Cornelio Saavedra – Memoria autógrafa
- Philip Stanhope, Viscount Mahon – Life of Belisarius
- David Walker – Walker's Appeal, in Four Articles; Together with a Preamble, to the Coloured Citizens of the World, but in Particular, and Very Expressly, to Those of the United States of America

== Births ==
- January 1 – Tommaso Salvini, Italian memoirist and actor (died 1915)
- January 12 – Rosanna Eleanor Leprohon, née Mullins, Canadian novelist and poet (died 1879)
- February 24 – Friedrich Spielhagen, German novelist (died 1911)
- March 4 – Samuel Rawson Gardiner, English historian (died 1902)
- April 24 – Luisa Cappiani, Austrian soprano, educator and essayist (died 1919)
- April 26 – Eva Brag, Swedish poet, novelist and journalist (died 1913)
- May 1 – José de Alencar, Brazilian novelist (died 1877)
- June 4 – Jane Lippitt Patterson, American writer and editor (died 1919)
- July 19 – Helen Vickroy Austin, American essayist, journalist, and horticulturist (died 1921)
- October 31 – Emma Tatham, English poet (died 1855)
- September 12 – Charles Dudley Warner, American essayist and novelist (died 1900)
- September 18 – Edna Dean Proctor, American poet and author (died 1923)
- September 25 – William Michael Rossetti, English critic (died 1919)
- November 21 – Martha Perry Lowe, American writer and activist (died 1902)
- December 8 – Henry Timrod, American poet (died 1867)

== Deaths ==
- January 6 – Josef Dobrovský, Czech historian (born 1753)
- January 11 – Karl Wilhelm Friedrich von Schlegel, German poet and critic (born 1772)
- January 15 – John Mastin, English memoirist, local historian and cleric (born 1747)
- January 29 – István Pauli (Pável) Hungarian Slovene priest and writer (born 1760)
- February 11 – Aleksander Griboyedov, Russian dramatist (killed by mob, born 1795)
- July 7 – Jacob Friedrich von Abel, German philosopher (born 1751)
- July 23 – Wojciech Bogusławski, Polish playwright and director (born 1757)
- September 29 – Pierre Étienne Louis Dumont, political writer (born 1759)
- October 10 – Maria Elizabetha Jacson, English writer on botany and gardening (born 1755)

== Awards ==
- Newdigate prize – Robert Stephen Hawker
