= Portrait of Lord Uxbridge =

Painting by Thomas Lawrence

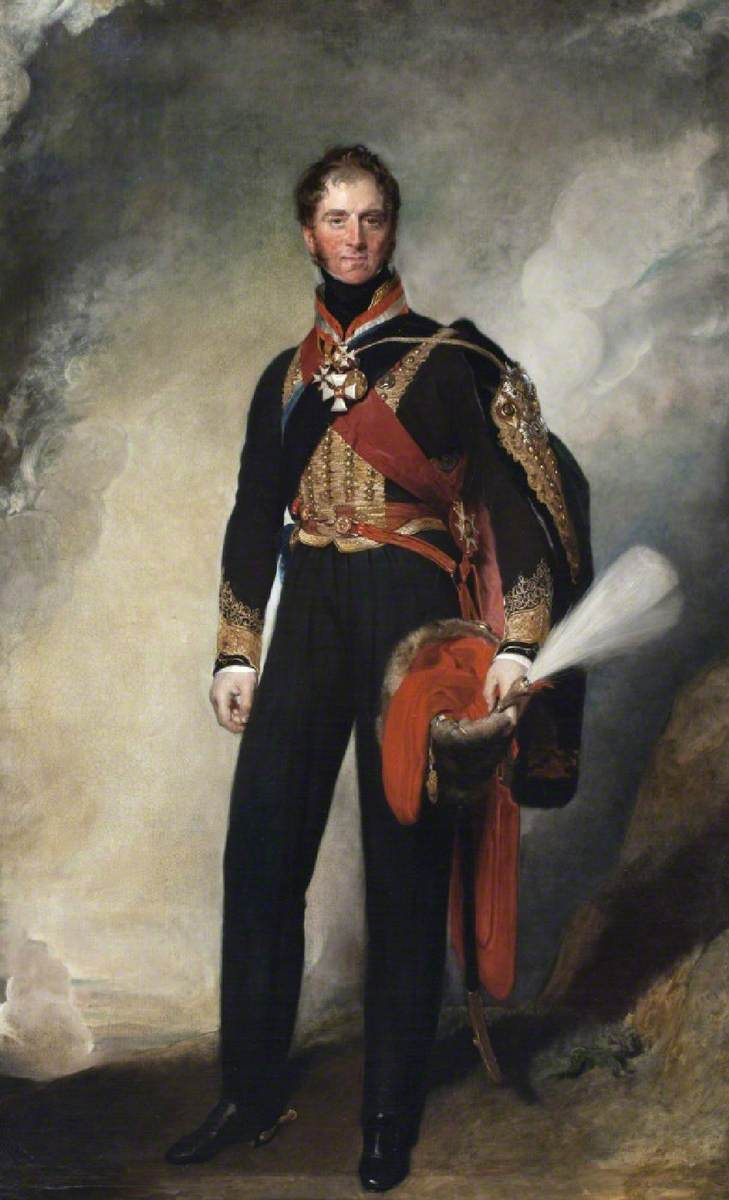
- Artist: Thomas Lawrence
- Year: c. 1817
- Type: Oil on canvas, portrait painting
- Dimensions: 236.2 cm × 147.3 cm (93.0 in × 58.0 in)
- Location: Plas Newydd, Wales

Portrait of Lord Uxbridge is a c.1817 full-length portrait painting by the English artist Thomas Lawrence. It depicts the British Army officer Henry Paget, 1st Marquess of Anglesey.

== Sitter ==
A noted cavalry commander as Lord Uxbridge, the sitter was second-in-command to the Duke of Wellington during the Hundred Days campaign of 1815 following Napoleon's escape from the Tuscan island of Elba. At the decisive Allied victory at the Battle of Waterloo he lost a leg to a French cannonball.

After the battle he was made Marquess of Anglesey by the Prince Regent but is still best known by the title he had at Waterloo. He later served twice as Lord Lieutenant of Ireland.

== Painting ==
Lawrence, a future President of the Royal Academy, was the leading portrait painter of the Regency era when Uxbridge sat for him. He is shown on the uniform of the 7th Hussars and wearing the Peninsular and Waterloo Medals. Today the painting is in the collection of the National Trust at the sitter's family estate at Plas Newydd on Anglesey in North Wales. A replica was commissioned by the Duke of Wellington for his London residence Apsley House, which features portraits of many of the officers who served under him.

== See also ==
- Portrait of the Marquess of Anglesey, an 1836 painting by Martin Archer Shee

== Bibliography ==
- Anglesey, Marquis of. One Leg: The Life and Letters of Henry William Paget Kg, First Marquess of Anglesey, 1768-1854. Leo Cooper, 1996.
- Billing, Joanna. The Hidden Places of Wales. Travel Publishing, 2003.
- Levey, Michael. Sir Thomas Lawrence. Yale University Press, 2005.
- Le Vay, Benedict. Eccentric Britain: The Bradt Guide to Britain's Follies and Foibles. Beast Travel Guides, 2005.
