= Portrait of the Marquess of Anglesey =

Painting by Martin Archer Shee

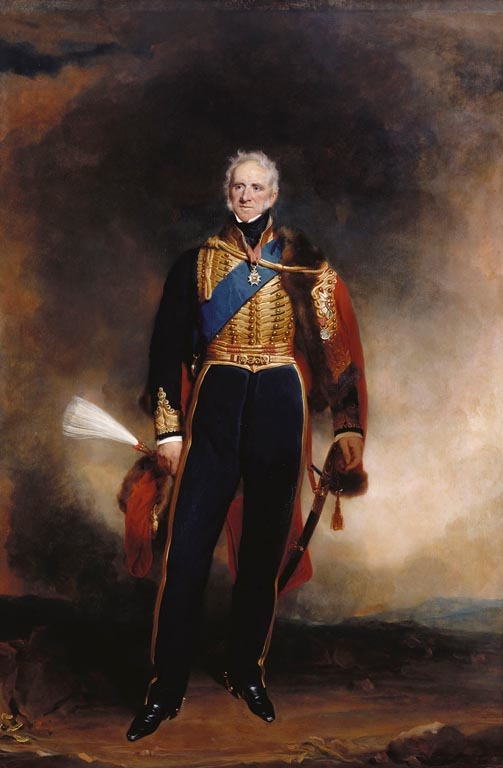
- Artist: Martin Archer Shee
- Year: 1836
- Type: Oil on canvas, portrait
- Dimensions: 268 cm × 182 cm (106 in × 72 in)
- Location: Windsor Castle, Windsor

Portrait of the Marquess of Anglesey is an 1836 portrait painting by the Irish artist Martin Archer Shee. It depicts the British general Henry Paget, 1st Marquess of Anglesey. A noted cavalryman during the Napoleonic Wars, Anglesey had subsequently become a noted public official. He served as Master-General of the Ordnance and twice as Lord Lieutenant of Ireland.

Archer Shee shows him at full-length in the uniform of the hussars with a red pelisse over his shoulder. He wears the decorations of the Order of the Bath and Order of the Garter. It shows no sign of the leg he had famously lost at the Battle of Waterloo while serving as the Duke of Wellington's second-in-command. The painting was commissioned by William IV for the Waterloo Chamber at Windsor Castle. William sought to make the gallery better suit its name by including more figures directly involved with Waterloo, as many of Thomas Lawrence's paintings featured a wider range of figures associated with the allied coalition during the Napoleonic Wars. It was one of two paintings for the Waterloo Gallery that Archer Shee displayed at the Royal Academy Exhibition of 1836 at Somerset House, the other featuring Thomas Picton who was killed at Waterloo.

Archer Shee was a noted painter of the Regency era who was elected as President of the Royal Academy in 1830 in succession to Thomas Lawrence and whose career continued into the Victorian era. Today the painting remains in the Waterloo Chamber as part of the Royal Collection.

== See also ==
- Portrait of Lord Uxbridge, an 1817 painting by Thomas Lawrence

== Bibliography ==
- Millar, Oliver. The Later Georgian Pictures in the Collection of Her Majesty the Queen. Phaidon 1969
- Robinson, John Martin. Windsor Castle: Official Guidebook. Royal Collection, 2006.
