= Alasco =

1824 play

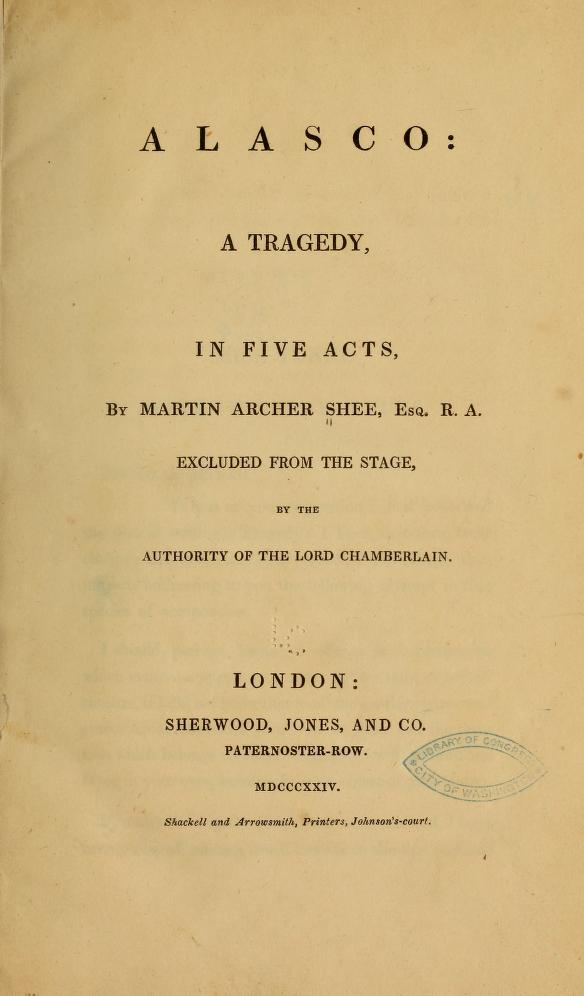
- Original language: English
- Written by: Martin Archer Shee
- Genre: Tragedy
- Setting: Poland

Premiere
- Date: 5 April 1824
- Place: Surrey Theatre, London

Alasco is an 1824 tragedy by Martin Archer Shee, the Irish painter and future President of the Royal Academy. While best known for his artworks Archer Shee also wrote poetry, two novels and this play. It was intended to be staged at the Theatre Royal, Covent Garden in London, but objections by the censor George Colman to the play's subject matter led to the Lord Chamberlain, the Scottish peer the Duke of Montrose to refuse it a license. Montrose and Colman were wary of any plays they regarded as touching on any revolutionary themes. Archer Shee published the work with a lengthy preface defending the play, and it was performed at the unlicensed Surrey Theatre south of the River Thames in April 1824.

== Bibliography ==
- Healy, Róisín. Poland in the Irish Nationalist Imagination, 1772–1922: Anti-Colonialism within Europe. Springer, 2017.
- Nicoll, Allardyce. A History of Early Nineteenth Century Drama 1800-1850. Cambridge University Press, 1930.
- Stephens, John Russell. The Censorship of English Drama 1824-1901. Cambridge University Press, 2010.
