= Lord Uxbridge's leg =

Leg and tourist attraction

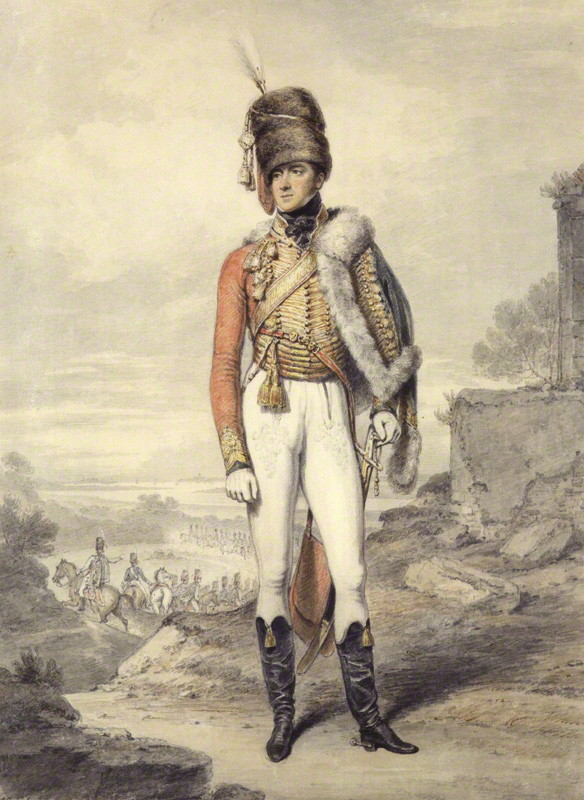
Lord Uxbridge portrayed by Henry Edridge in 1808, before the loss of his leg

Lord Uxbridge's leg was shattered, probably by a piece of case shot, at the Battle of Waterloo and removed by a surgeon. The amputated right limb became a tourist attraction in the village of Waterloo, Belgium, where it had been removed and interred.

== Waterloo ==
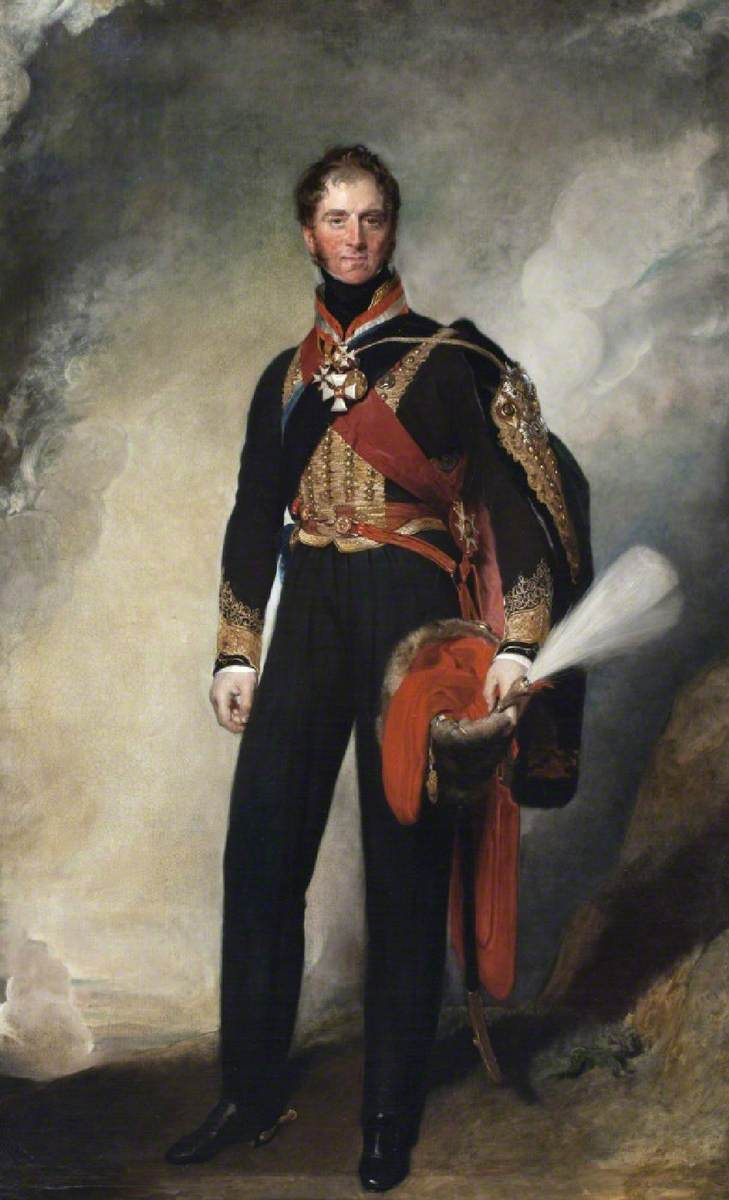
Lord Uxbridge portrayed by Henry Edridge in 1817, after the loss of his leg

Henry Paget, 2nd Earl of Uxbridge, later the 1st Marquess of Anglesey, commanded 13,000 Allied cavalry and 44 guns of the horse artillery at the Battle of Waterloo, on 18 June 1815. At about 2:30 pm, at a critical stage in the battle, he led a charge of the 2,000 heavy cavalry of the Household Brigade and the Union Brigade to throw back the columns of D'Erlon's French I Corps, who were threatening to push back Picton's severely outnumbered 5th Division, with some 15,000 French infantry advancing on 3,000 British and Dutch-Belgian troops. The charge succeeded in sweeping the French infantry away in disorder, but Uxbridge was unable to rally his troops, who ran on in pursuit and were cut up by counter-attacking French cavalry. Uxbridge spent the rest of the battle leading a series of charges by British light cavalry formations, and had eight or nine horses shot from under him.

One of the last cannon shots fired that day hit his right leg, necessitating its amputation above the knee. According to an anecdote, he was close to the Duke of Wellington when his leg was hit, and exclaimed, "By God, sir, I've lost my leg!", to which Wellington replied "By God, sir, so you have!"

A more reliable version of this exchange may come from the diary of J. W. Croker, a friend of Wellington, written on 8 December 1818, in which he recounts a conversation with Horace Seymour, the man who carried the wounded Uxbridge from the battlefield. Seymour recalled that when Uxbridge was hit he cried out "I have got it at last," to which the Duke of Wellington replied "No? Have you, by God?"

== Amputation ==
After being wounded, Lord Uxbridge was taken to his headquarters in the village of Waterloo, a house owned by M. Hyacinthe Joseph-Marie Paris, Maison Tremblant, who was still in his residence at 214, Chaussée de Bruxelles. There, his damaged leg was amputated at mid-thigh by Doctor John Hume, assisted by surgeons James Powell of the Ordnance Medical Department, and James Callander of the 7th Hussars.

Lord Uxbridge, true to his nature, remained stoical and composed. According to his aide-de-camp, Thomas Wildman, during the amputation Paget smiled and said, "I have had a pretty long run. I have been a beau these forty-seven years, and it would not be fair to cut the young men out any longer." According to another anecdote his only comment through the procedure was, "The knives appear somewhat blunt."

According to the account of Sir Hussey Vivian recorded by Henry Curling in 1847:

Just after the Surgeon had taken off the Marquis of Anglesey's leg, Sir Hussey Vivian came into the cottage where the operation was performed. "Ah, Vivian!" said the wounded noble, "I want you to do me a favour. Some of my friends here seem to think I might have kept that leg on. Just go and cast your eye upon it, and tell me what you think." "I went, accordingly", said Sir Hussey, "and, taking up the lacerated limb, carefully examined it, and so far as I could tell, it was completely spoiled for work. A rusty grape-shot had gone through and shattered the bones all to pieces. I therefore returned to the Marquis and told him he could set his mind quite at rest, as his leg, in my opinion, was better off than on."

A further anecdote reports him saying "Who would not lose a leg for such a victory?" The saw used to amputate his leg is held by the National Army Museum.

Uxbridge was offered an annual pension of £1,200 in compensation for the loss of his leg, which he refused. Five days after the battle the Prince Regent created him Marquess of Anglesey and appointed him a Knight Grand Cross of the Order of the Bath.

== Shrine ==
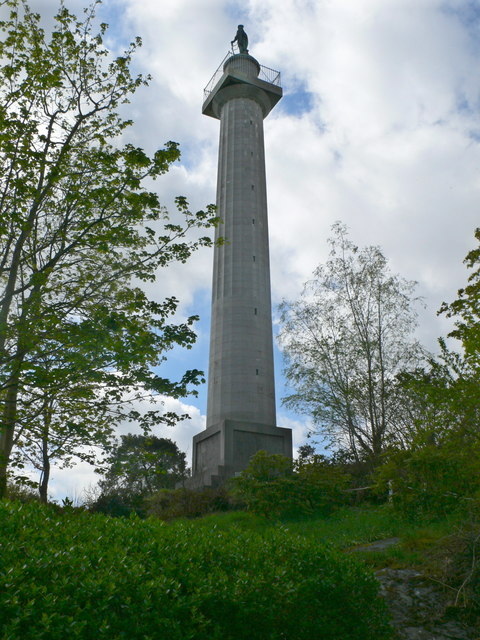
Marquess of Anglesey's Column, Llanfairpwllgwyngyll, Anglesey

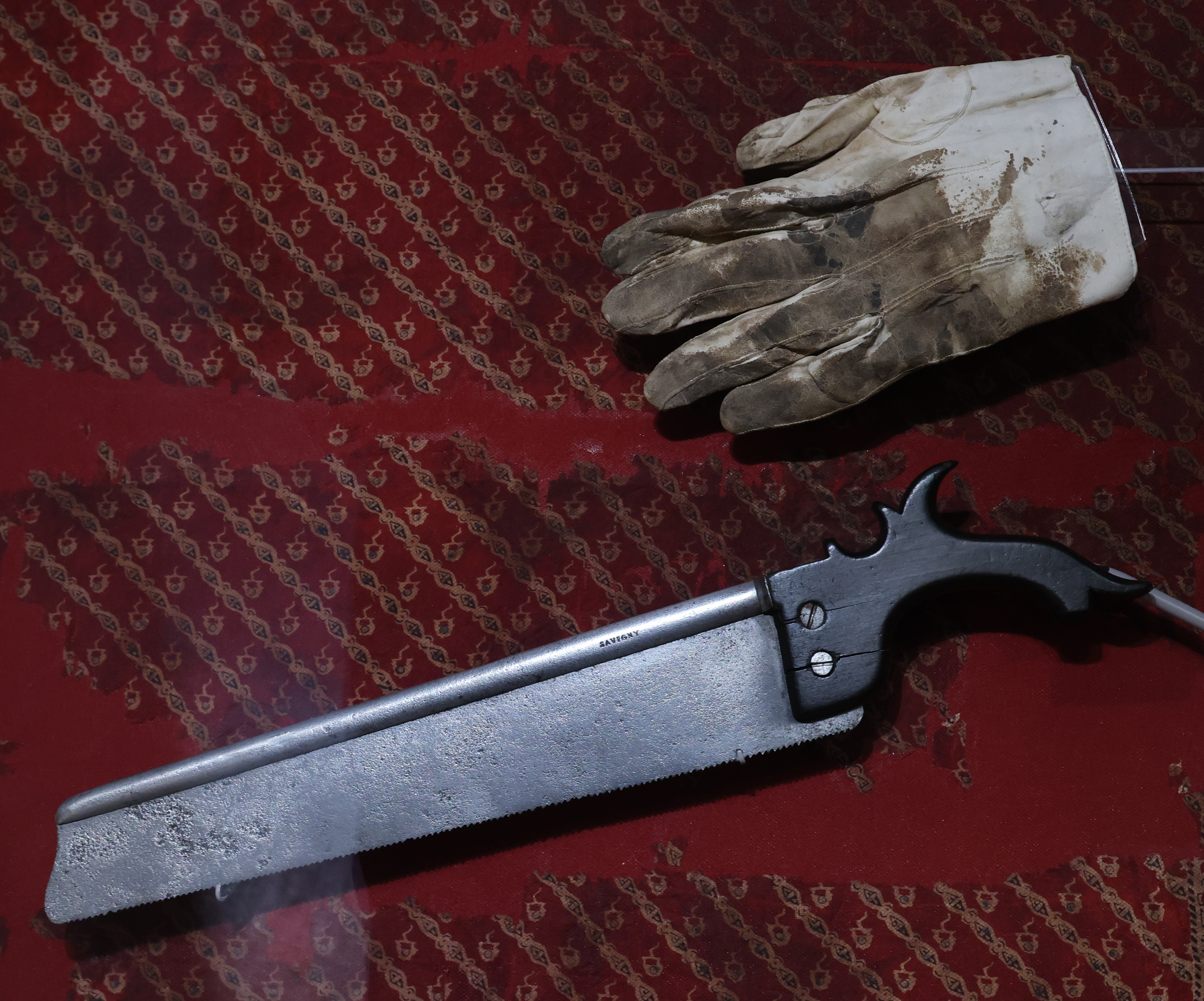
Glove and saw used in the amputation of Lord Uxbridge's leg

Paris asked if he might bury the leg in his garden, later turning the place into a kind of shrine, as for a relic. Visitors were first taken to see the bloody chair upon which Uxbridge had sat during the amputation, before being escorted into the garden, where the leg had its own 'tombstone', inscribed as follows:

Here lies the Leg of the illustrious and valiant Earl Uxbridge, Lieutenant-General of His Britannic Majesty, Commander in Chief of the English, Belgian and Dutch cavalry, wounded on the 18 June 1815 at the memorable battle of Waterloo, who, by his heroism, assisted in the triumph of the cause of mankind, gloriously decided by the resounding victory of the said day.

Some were impressed; others less so. According to an article headed "Marquis of Anglesey's Leg" in Notes and Queries, 1862, a wag wrote on the tombstone –

Here lies the Marquis of Anglesey's limb;
The Devil will have the remainder of him.

George Canning recorded his own impressions in verse. Some of these lines are also recorded in Notes and Queries, which says they "went the round of the papers at the time":

Here rests, and let no saucy knave
Presume to sneer and laugh,
To learn that mouldering in the grave
Is laid a British calf.

For he who writes these lines is sure
That those who read the whole
Will find such laugh were premature,
For here, too, lies a sole.

And here five little ones repose,
Twin-born with other five;
Unheeded by their brother toes,
Who now are all alive.

A leg and foot to speak more plain
Lie here, of one commanding;
Who, though his wits he might retain,
Lost half his understanding.

And when the guns, with thunder fraught,
Pour'd bullets thick as hail,
Could only in this way be taught
To give his foe leg-bail.

And now in England, just as gay -
As in the battle brave -
Goes to the rout, review, or play,
With one foot in the grave.

Fortune in vain here showed her spite,
For he will still be found,
Should England's sons engage in fight,
Resolved to stand his ground.

But fortune's pardon I must beg,
She meant not to disarm;
And when she lopped the hero's leg
By no means sought his harm,

And but indulged a harmless whim,
Since he could walk with one,
She saw two legs were lost on him
Who never meant to run.

The leg attracted a remarkable range of tourists from the upper reaches of European society, such as the King of Prussia and the Prince of Orange. It provided a useful income for Monsieur Paris and his descendants until 1878, when it was the occasion for a minor diplomatic incident. Uxbridge's son visited, to find the bones not buried, but on open display. On investigation by the Belgian ambassador in London, it was discovered that they had been exposed in a storm which uprooted the willow tree beside which they were buried. The ambassador demanded repatriation of the relics to England but the Paris family refused, instead offering to sell the bones to the Uxbridge family, who were enraged. At this point the Belgian Minister of Justice intervened, ordering the bones to be reburied. However, the bones were not reburied; they were kept hidden. In 1934, after the last Monsieur Paris died in Brussels, his widow found them in his study, along with documentation proving their provenance. Horrified by the thought of another scandal, she incinerated them in her central heating furnace.

== Aftermath ==
"Imaginary Meeting of Sir Arthur Wellesley (1769–1852), Duke of Wellington and Sir Henry William Paget" by Constantinus Fidelio Coene, c. 1820

Uxbridge's close family lost several limbs in the service of the United Kingdom during the Napoleonic Wars: his brother, Major-General Sir Edward Paget, lost his right arm in the crossing of the Douro during the Second Battle of Porto in 1809, and his daughter lost a hand tending her husband on a battlefield in Spain.

Uxbridge used an articulated above-knee artificial leg invented by James Potts of Chelsea, with hinged knee and ankle and raising toes which became known as the Anglesey leg, after his marquessate. One of the artificial legs designed by Potts and worn by the marquess is preserved at Plas Newydd in Anglesey, as is a leg of the hussar trousers worn by the 1st Marquess at Waterloo. Others are in the Household Cavalry Museum and the Musée de l'Armée in Paris. The loss of his leg did not impede the Marquess of Anglesey's career. He rose to become a field marshal and Knight of the Garter, twice serving as Lord Lieutenant of Ireland and twice as Master-General of the Ordnance.

The Belgian artist Constantinus Fidelio Coene (1780–1841) painted Imaginary Meeting of Sir Arthur Wellesley (1769–1852), Duke of Wellington and Sir Henry William Paget (1768–1854), 1st Marquess of Anglesey, after the Amputation of His Leg, which shows the Marquess with his bandaged stump. This oil painting of c.1820, measuring 83 x 140.5 cm, was given by the 7th Duke of Wellington to his godson the future 8th Marquess of Anglesey, who donated it to the National Trust in 1992; it is displayed in Plas Newydd.

In 1961, the 7th Marquess of Anglesey published a biography of his great-great-grandfather, entitled One-Leg: the life and letters of Henry William Paget, first Marquess of Anglesey.

== See also ==
- Daniel Sickles's leg
