= Portrait of Queen Victoria (Archer Shee) =

Painting by Martin Archer Shee

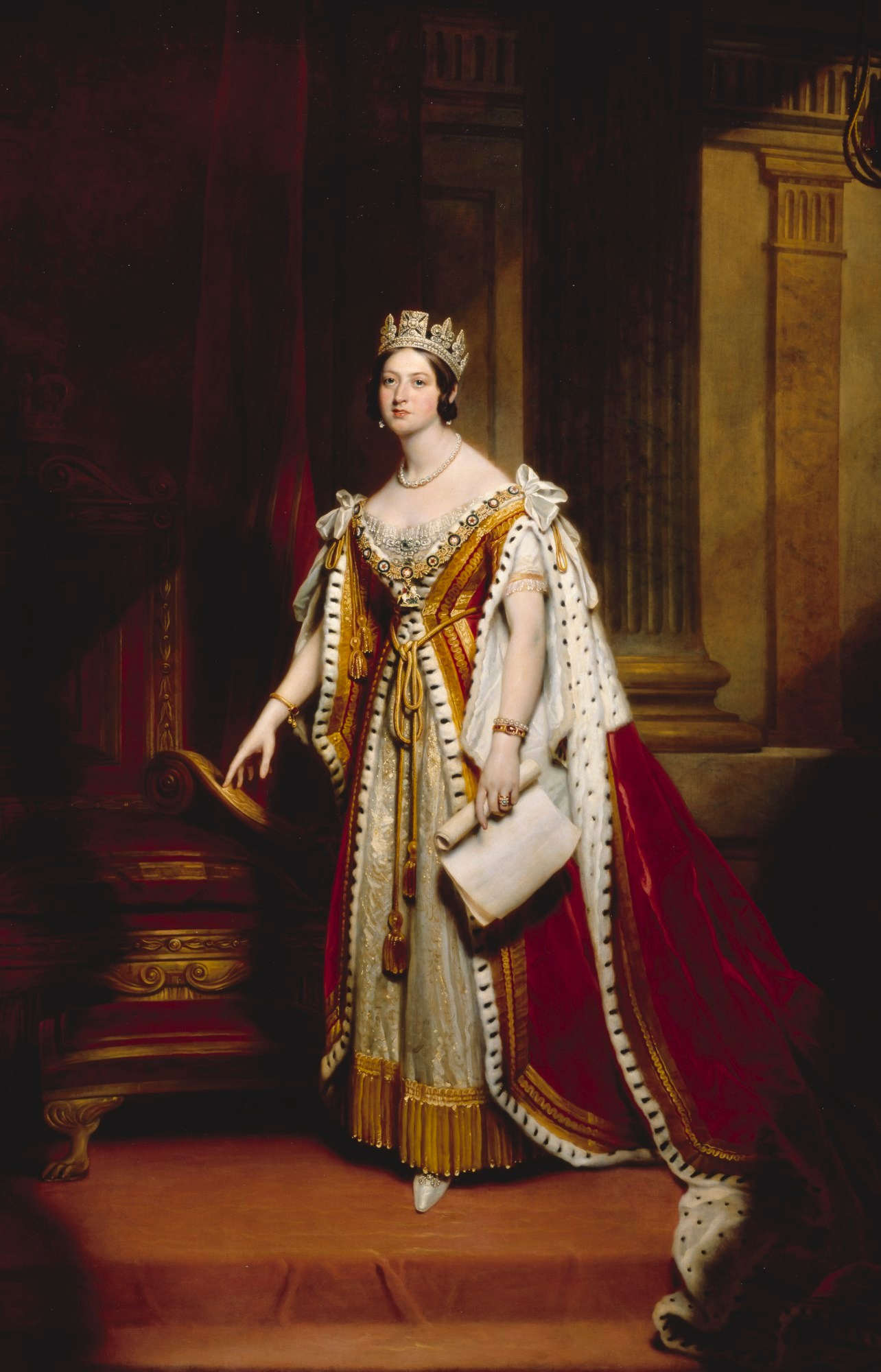
- Artist: Martin Archer Shee
- Year: 1843
- Type: Oil on canvas, portrait painting
- Dimensions: 270 cm × 177.5 cm (110 in × 69.9 in)
- Location: Royal Academy of Arts, London

Portrait of Queen Victoria is an oil on canvas portrait painting by the Irish artist Martin Archer Shee, from 1843. It depicts Queen Victoria, who has succeeded to the throne five years earlier. She is shown at full-length wearing the robes of state.

Archer Shee was a fashionable portraitist who had made his name during the Regency era and had been elected President of the Royal Academy in 1830, succeeding his friend and rival Thomas Lawrence. The painting was commissioned by the academy from Archer Shee. Sixty years earlier portraits of King George III and Queen Charlotte, Victoria's grandparents, had been produced for the academy by the inaugural President Joshua Reynolds.

The painting was displayed at the Royal Academy Exhibition of 1843 at Somerset House. It remains in the collection of the Royal Academy.

== Bibliography ==
- Hutchison, Sidney Charles. The History of the Royal Academy 1768-1986. Royce, 1986.
