= Self-Portrait (Archer Shee) =

Painting by Martin Archer Shee

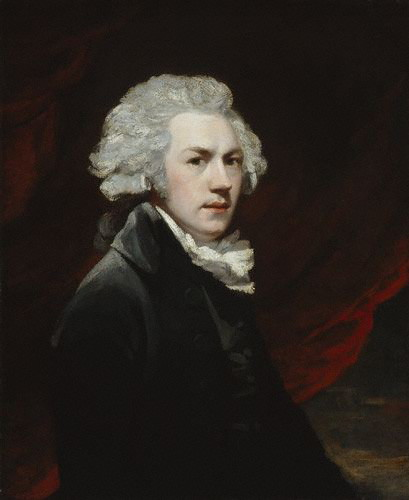
- Artist: Martin Archer Shee
- Year: 1794
- Type: Oil on canvas, portrait painting
- Dimensions: 76.2 cm × 63.9 cm (30.0 in × 25.2 in)
- Location: National Portrait Gallery, London

Self-Portrait is a 1794 portrait painting by the Irish artist Martin Archer Shee. A self-portrait painted when the artist was ages around twenty five, he is shown in the fashionable powdered wig of the period. A leading portraitist of the Regency era, he was overshadowed by his friend and contemporary Thomas Lawrence. Archer Shee succeeded Lawrence as President of the Royal Academy in 1830 and held the post until his death in 1850 during the Victorian era.

The painting was displayed at the Royal Academy Exhibition of 1794 at Somerset House. Today it is in the collection of the National Portrait Gallery in London, having been purchased in 1897.

== Bibliography ==
- Crookshank, Anne. Irish Portraits 1660-1860. Paul Mellon Foundation, 1969.
- Ormond, Richard. Early Victorian Portraits, National Portrait Gallery, 1974.
