= The Painter's Son =

Painting by Martin Archer Shee

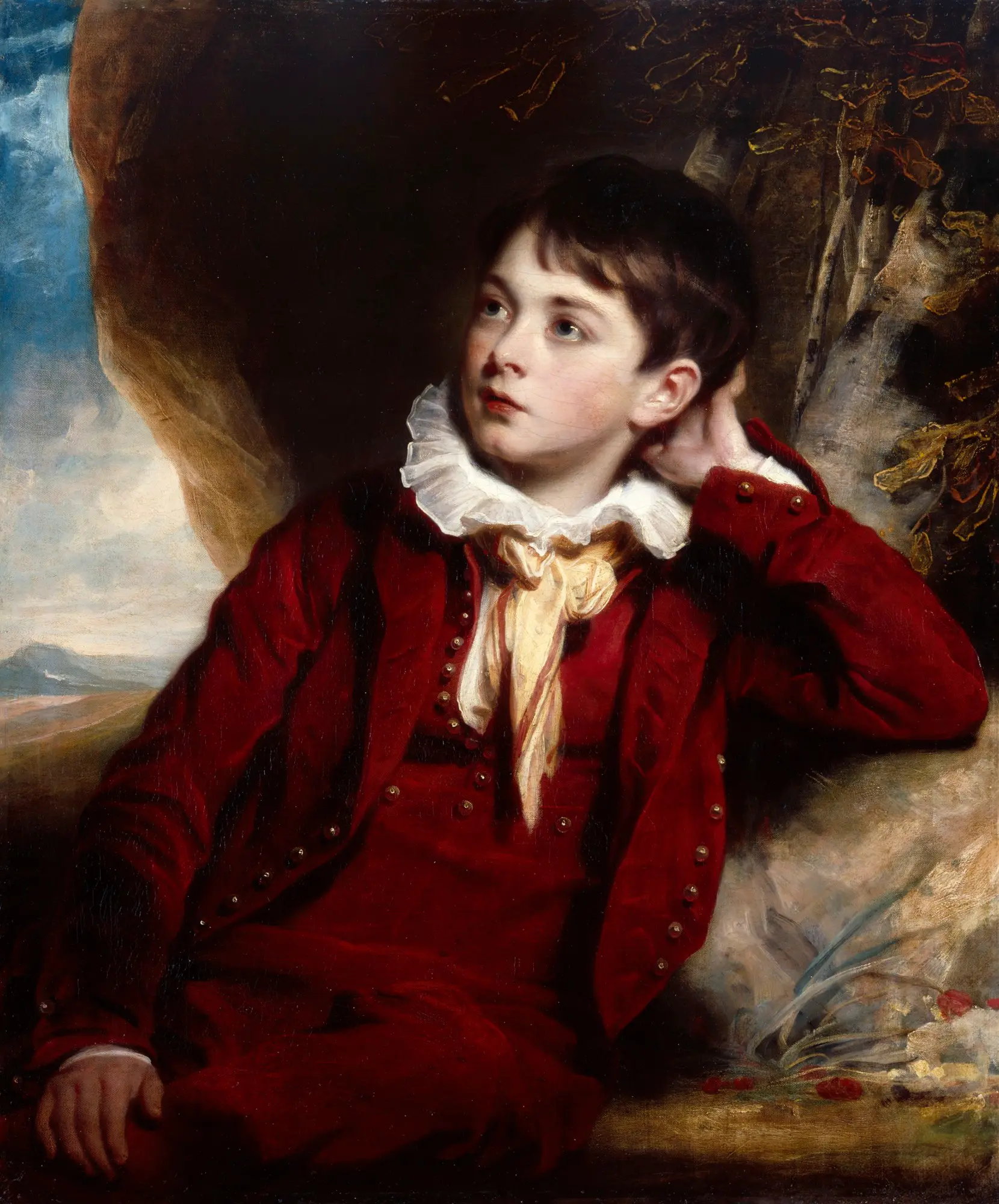
- Artist: Martin Archer Shee
- Year: c. 1820
- Type: Oil on canvas, portrait painting
- Dimensions: 76.2 cm × 63.5 cm (30.0 in × 25.0 in)
- Location: Royal Academy of Arts; London

The Painter's Son or The Artist's Son is an oil on canvas portrait painting by the Irish artist Martin Archer Shee, from c. 1820.

== History and description ==
It depicts the artist's third and youngest son William, then aged around ten, against a romantic background and wearing a burgundy suit with a ruffled collar.

Archer Shee was a friend of the leading portraitist of the Regency era Thomas Lawrence. The work suggests the influence of Lawrence on Archer Shee's style. Equally it may have provided some inspiration for one of Lawrence's best known-works, The Red Boy, produced five years later and displayed at the Royal Academy Exhibition of 1825. Archer Shee went on to succeed Lawrence as President of the Royal Academy in 1830. The original is now in the collection of the Royal Academy, having been acquired in 1894. A version also exists in the Metropolitan Museum of Art in New York City.

== Bibliography ==
- Baetjer, Katharine. British Paintings in the Metropolitan Museum of Art, 1575-1875. Metropolitan Museum of Art, 2009.
- Monkhouse, Christopher P., Fitzpatrick, Leslie & Laffan, William (ed.) Ireland: Crossroads of Art and Design, 1690-1840. Art Institute of Chicago, 2015.
