= Belisarius (Archer Shee) =

Painting by Martin Archer Shee

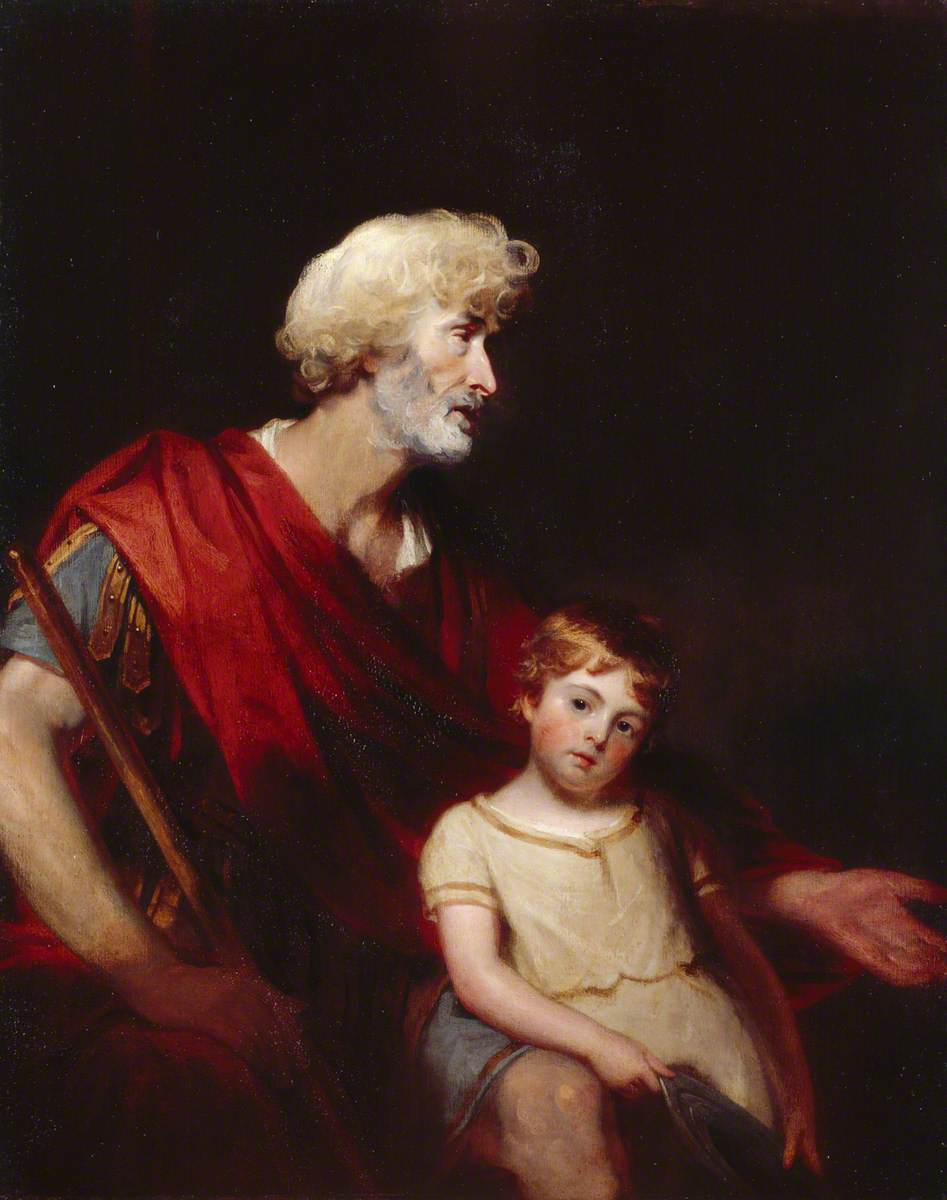
- Artist: Martin Archer Shee
- Year: 1809
- Type: Oil on canvas, history painting
- Dimensions: 127.5 cm × 102 cm (50.2 in × 40 in)
- Location: Royal Academy of Arts, London

Belisarius is an 1809 history painting by the Irish artist Martin Archer Shee. It depicts a legendary scene featuring Belisarius, a heroic former general of the Byzantine Empire begging on the streets with the assistance of a boy having been dismissed after being wrongly accused of conspiracy. It was a popular, recurring theme in art. The Dublin-born Archer Shee was a prominent figure in the Regency era art world noted for his portrait paintings.

When Archer Shee was elected as a member of the Royal Academy of Arts, he was required to submit a diploma work and chose to present this painting as portraits were not permitted. Archer Shee went on to become President of the Royal Academy in 1830, succeeding Thomas Lawrence. The picture was later displayed at the Art Treasures Exhibition of 1857 in Manchester. It remains in the collection of the Royal Academy in London.

== Bibliography ==
- Baetjer, Katharine. British Paintings in the Metropolitan Museum of Art, 1575-1875. Metropolitan Museum of Art, 2009.
- Crookshank, Anne. Painters of Ireland, C. 1660-1920. Barrie & Jenkins, 1979.
- Pergam, Elizabeth A. The Manchester Art Treasures Exhibition of 1857. Routledge, 2017.
