= Constantinus Fidelio Coene =

Flemish painter (1779–1841)

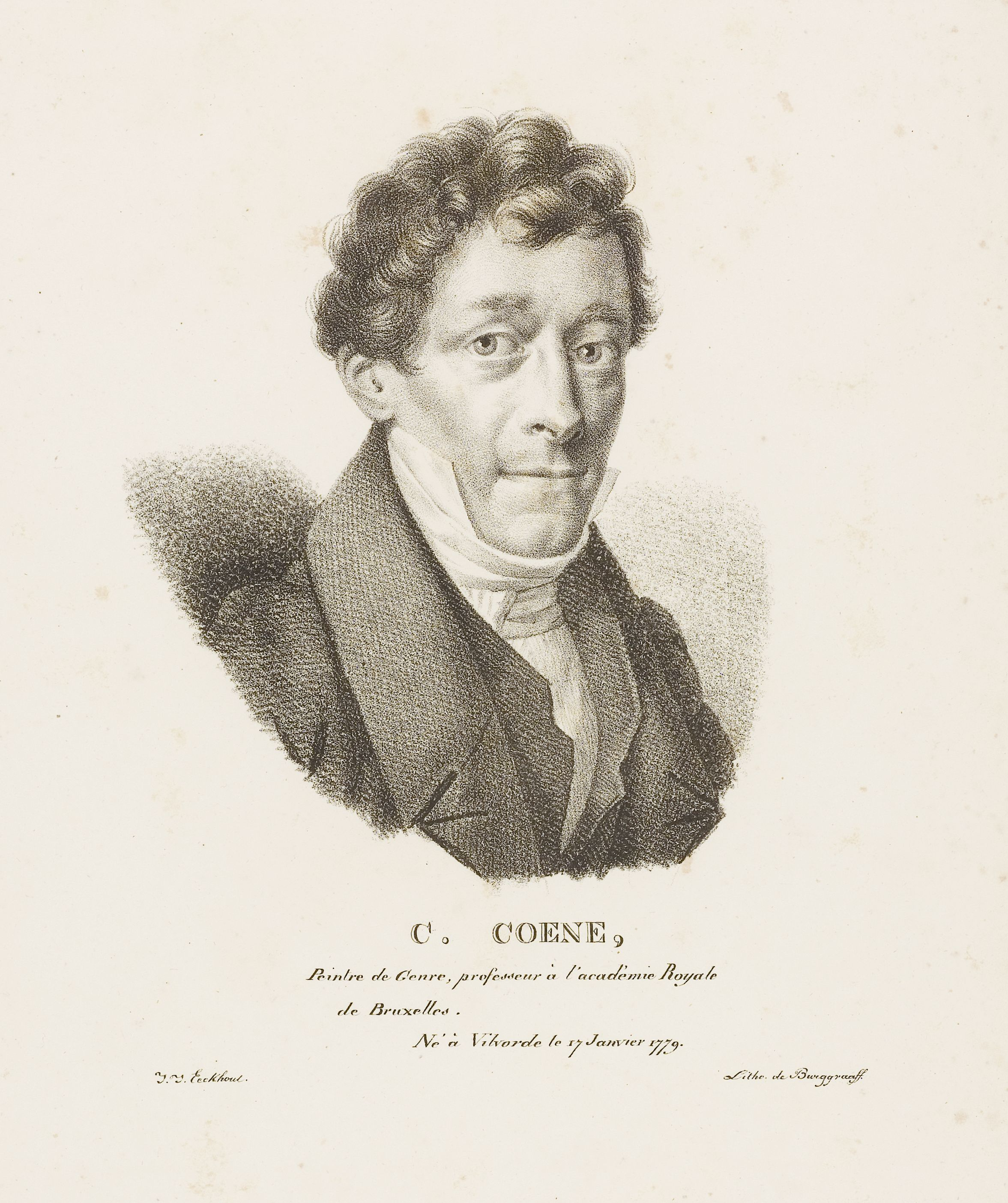
Constantin Coene

Constantinus Fidelio Coene (1779–1841) was a painter of history, genre, and landscape pieces.

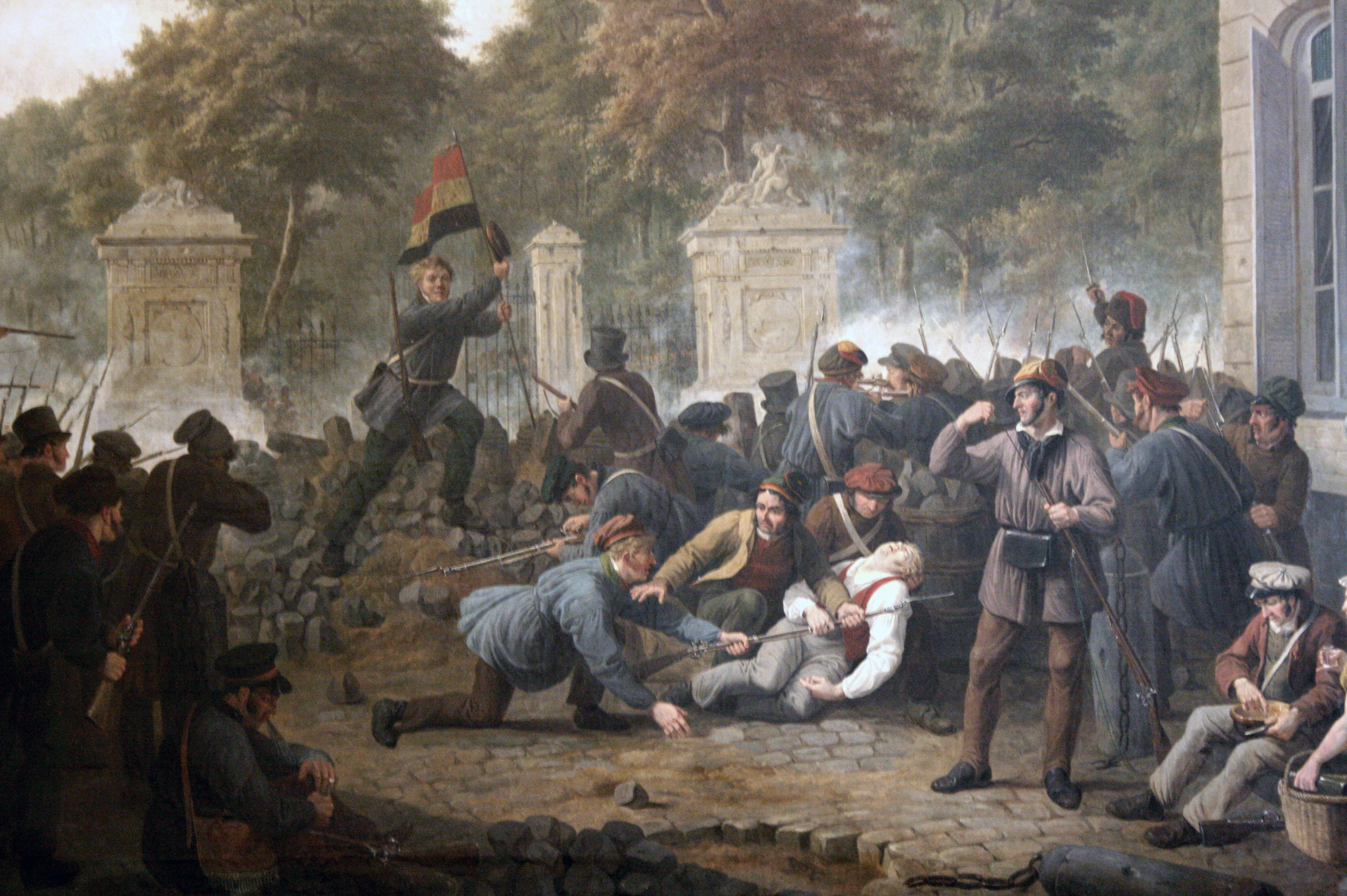
Assault on the Park of Brussels, a scene from the Belgian Revolution of 1830, now in the Royal Museums of Fine Arts of Belgium.

Coene was born in 1779 at Vilvoorde. He first studied under Henri Van Assche, and in 1809 moved to Amsterdam and became the pupil of Pieter Bartholomeusz Barbiers. He then went to Brussels, and in 1820 was made Professor at the academy. His picture of Rubens receiving from Charles I the sword with which he had been knighted gained him the grand prize at Ghent, and is now in the Museum of that city. His Soldier returning from the Battle of Waterloo also gained him much praise. He died at Brussels on 20 August 1841.
