= Oldcourt (novel) =

1829 novel by Martin Archer Shee

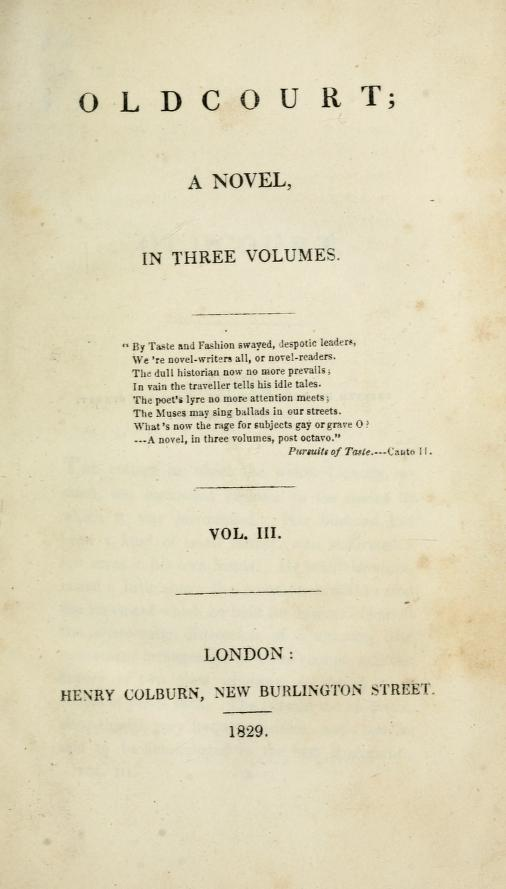
- Author: Martin Archer Shee
- Language: English
- Genre: Historical drama
- Publisher: Henry Colburn
- Publication date: 1829
- Publication place: United Kingdom
- Media type: Print

Oldcourt is an 1829 novel by the Irish writer Martin Archer Shee, originally published in three volumes. Archer Shee is better known as a painter, and was the following year elected President of the Royal Academy in London, but he also published poetry, two novels and a play. It was published by Henry Colburn of New Burlington Street in London. It takes place around Oldcourt Castle, in Ireland, and depicts Roman Catholic characters at the time of Catholic Emancipation. It received a negative review in The Athenaeum magazine. Archer Shee followed it with a second novel Cecil Hyde in 1834.

== Bibliography ==
- Lee, Sidney. Dictionary of National Biography: Volume LLII. Smith, Elder, 1897.
