= Martin Archer Shee =

Irish painter (1769–1850)

Sir Martin Archer Shee PRA FRS
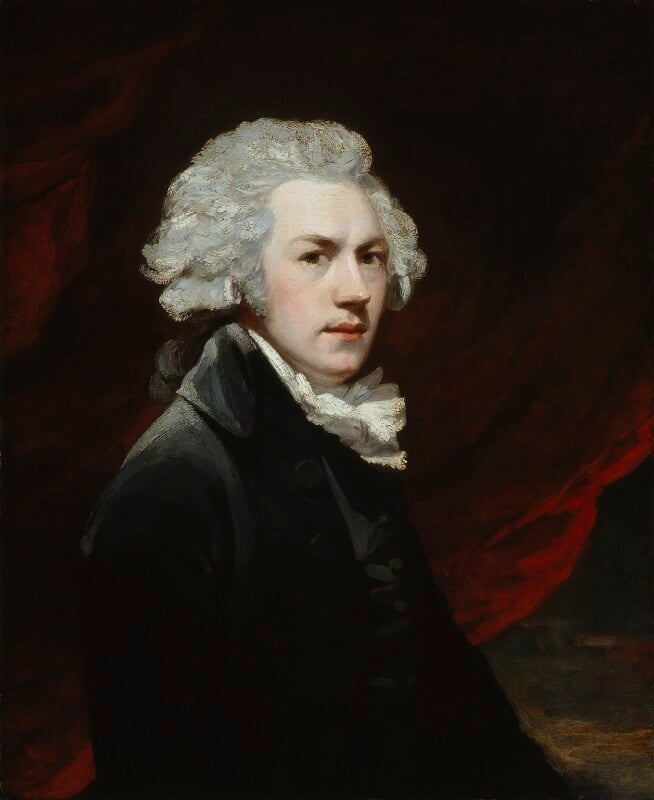
- Self-Portrait, 1794

President of the Royal Academy
- In office January 1830 – 13 August 1850
- Preceded by: Sir Thomas Lawrence
- Succeeded by: Sir Charles Lock Eastlake

Personal details
- Born: 23 December 1769 Dublin, Ireland
- Died: 13 August 1850 (aged 80) Brighton, Sussex, England
- Known for: Portraiture, literature

Sir Martin Archer Shee PRA FRS (23 December 1769 – 13 August 1850) was an Irish painter and writer. He specialised in portrait painting. He enjoyed success during the Regency era. From 1830 he served as the president of the Royal Academy in succession to Thomas Lawrence.

== Early life ==
He was born in Dublin, of an old Irish Roman Catholic family, the son of Martin Shee, a merchant, who regarded the profession of a painter as an unsuitable occupation for a descendant of the Shees. His son Martin nevertheless studied art in the Royal Dublin Society and came to London. There, in 1788, he was introduced by Edmund Burke to Joshua Reynolds, on whose advice he studied in the schools of the Royal Academy of Arts.

== Career ==
=== Painting ===
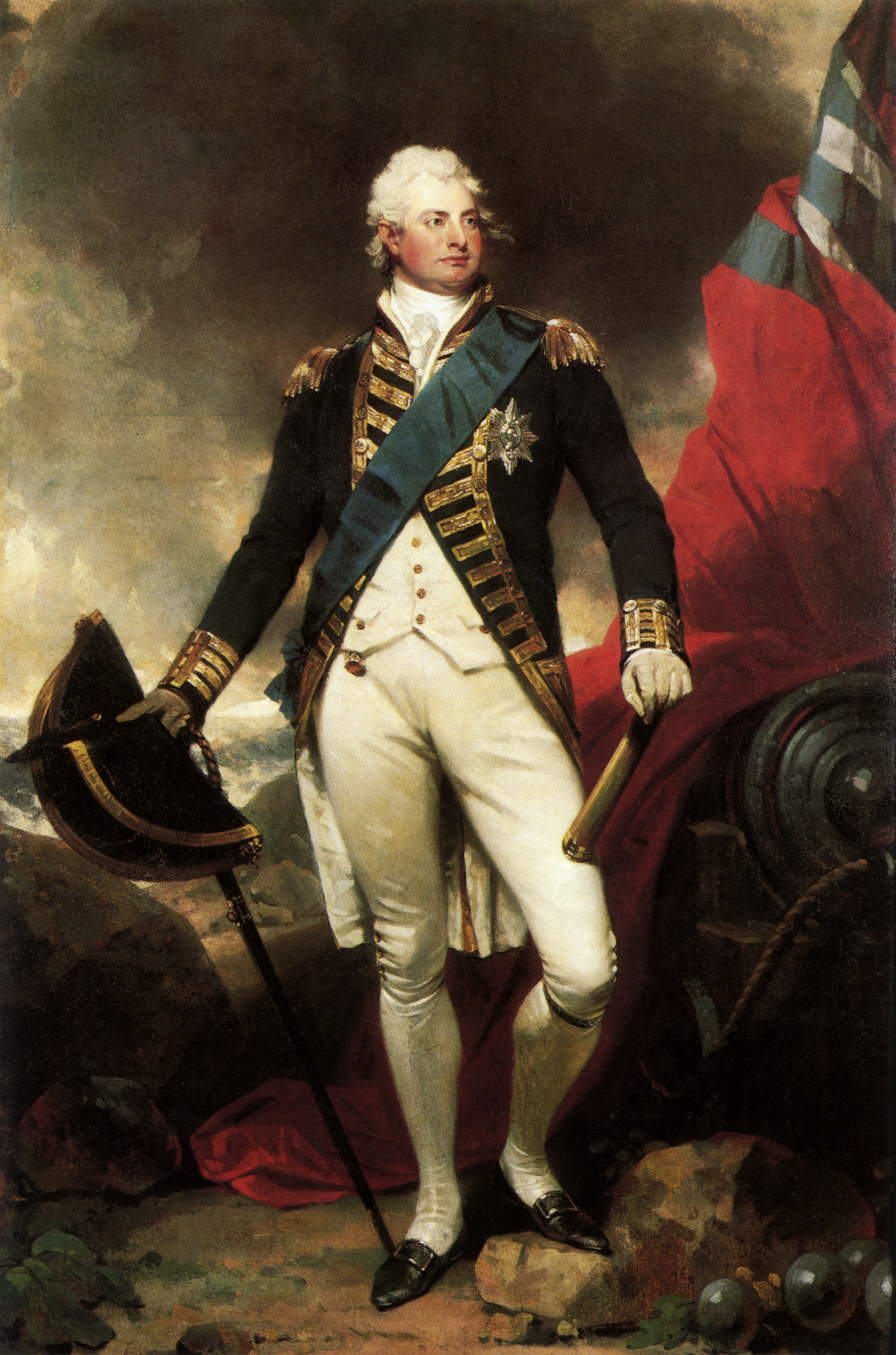
Portrait of the Duke of Clarence. Portrait of William, Duke of Clarence, 1800

In 1789, he exhibited his first two pictures, the Head of an Old Man and Portrait of a Gentleman. Over the next ten years he steadily increased in practice. He was chosen an associate of the Royal Academy in 1798.

In 1789, he married Mary, eldest daughter of James Power of Youghal. In 1800 he was elected a Royal Academician. He moved to George Romney's former house at 32 Cavendish Square, and set up as his successor. He was acknowledged as one of the In addition to his portraits he executed various subjects and historical works, such as Lavinia, Belisarius, his diploma picture Prospero and Miranda, and the Daughter of Jephthah. In 1809 he donated his history painting Belisarius as his diploma work to the Royal Academy of Arts, as portraits were not permitted. It depicts a scene from Byzantine Empire, popular with artists of the era. During the Regency era he continued to produce portraits of leading figures, but was often overshadowed by his friend and rival Thomas Lawrence.

Amongst the notable figures who sat to him were his fellow Irishmen the politician Henry Grattan and the author Thomas Moore, both paintings now in the National Gallery of Ireland in Dublin.

=== Writing ===
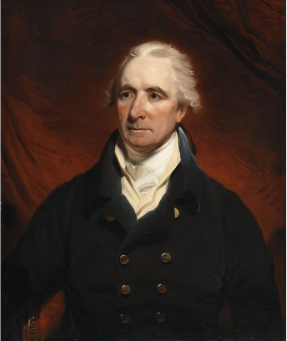
Portrait of the Irish politician Henry Grattan, a friend of Archer Shee.

In 1805 he published a poem consisting of Rhymes on Art, and a second part followed in 1809. Lord Byron spoke well of it in his English Bards and Scotch Reviewers. Shee published another small volume of verse in 1814, entitled The Commemoration of Sir Joshua Reynolds, and other Poems, but this was less successful. He also produced a tragedy, Alasco, set in Poland. The play was accepted at Covent Garden, but was refused a licence, on the grounds that it contained treasonable allusions, and Shee angrily resolved to make his appeal to the public. He carried out his threat in 1824, but Alasco was still on the list of unacted dramas in 1911. He also published three novels – Oldcourt (1829, in three volumes), Cecil Hyde (1834) and Harry Calverley (1835).

== President of the Royal Academy ==
On the death of Sir Thomas Lawrence in 1830, Shee was chosen president of the Royal Academy in his stead and shortly afterwards received a knighthood. In 1831, he was elected a Fellow of the Royal Society. He continued to exhibit regularly at the Royal Academy's Summer Exhibitions. At the Royal Academy Exhibition of 1836, the last to be held at Somerset House, he produced two paintings for the Waterloo Chamber at Windsor Castle. One featured Thomas Picton and the other was his Portrait of the Marquess of Anglesey, representing two of the commanders at the Battle of Waterloo in 1815.

Archer Shee benefited from the support of William IV who came to the throne in 1830. In 1843 he produced a Portrait of Queen Victoria depicting the young queen, commissioned from him by the academy. He recognised the talent of the young John Everett Millais and encouraged his parents to let him pursue painting as a career.

In an examination before the parliamentary committee of 1836 concerning the functions of the Royal Academy, he ably defended its rights. The following year the Royal Academy relocated from Somerset House to its new home at the National Gallery. He continued to paint till 1845, when illness made him retire to Brighton. He was deputised for at the academy by J. M. W. Turner, who had appointed him a trustee of the projected Turner almshouse. From 1842 to 1849, he was the first president of the Birmingham Society of Artists.

== Death ==
Shee died in Brighton in 1850 and was buried in the western extension to St Nicholas' Churchyard in Brighton. His headstone remains, but has been laid flat and moved to the perimeter of the site.

== Personal life ==
Shee had three sons, who became successful barristers, and three daughters.

One of his descendants was George Archer-Shee, whose story inspired The Winslow Boy, a play written by Sir Terence Rattigan; another descendant was Martin Archer-Shee, a member of parliament in England.

Shee's descendant, Mary Archer-Shee, supports the campaign for the fulfilment of Turner's wishes for his bequests.

== Written works by Shee (selected) ==
- Elements of art, a poem; in six cantos (1809)
- Rhymes on Art; Or, The Remonstrance of a Painter: in Two Parts (1809)
- The Commemoration of Reynolds: In Two Parts (1814)
- Oldcourt: Volume 1, Volume 2, Volume 3 (London : H. Colburn, 1829)
- Alasco: A Tragedy, in Five Acts (Sherwood, Jones, and co., 1824).
- Cecil Hyde (1834)
- Harry Calverley (1835)

== Gallery ==
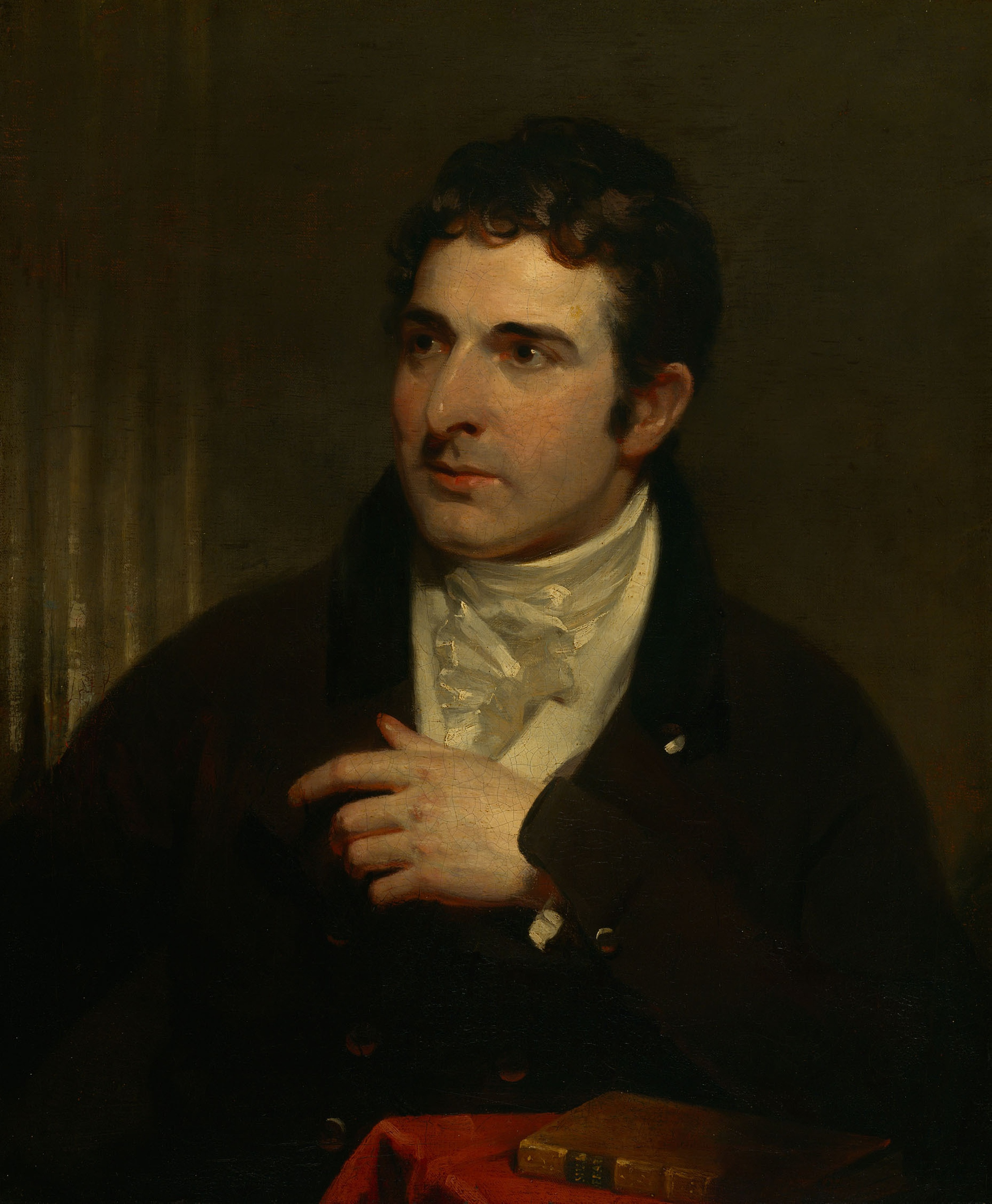
John Philip Kemble, c.1795

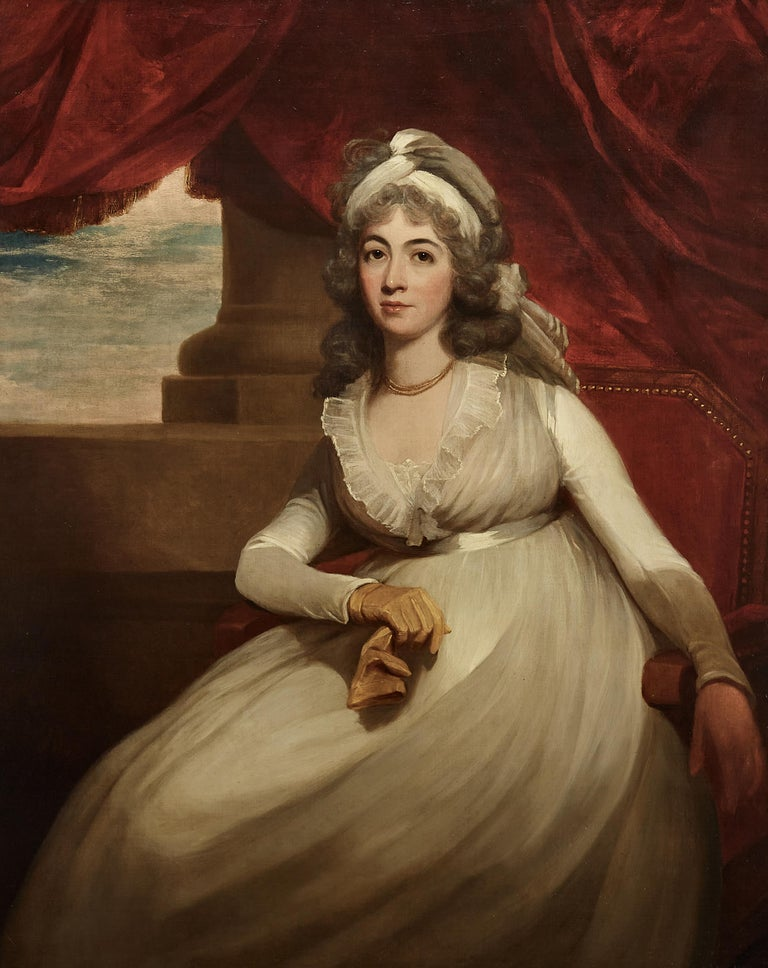
Duchess of Cumberland, c.1795

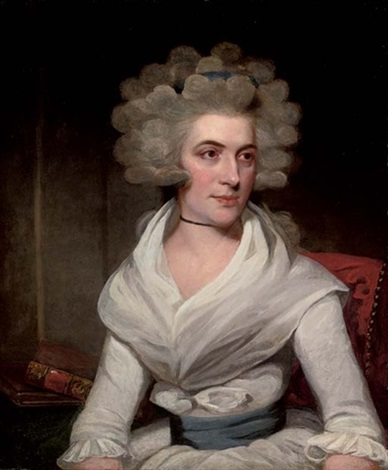
Anna Larpent, c.1800

John Henry Johnstone, 1803

Marquess of Hartington, 1806

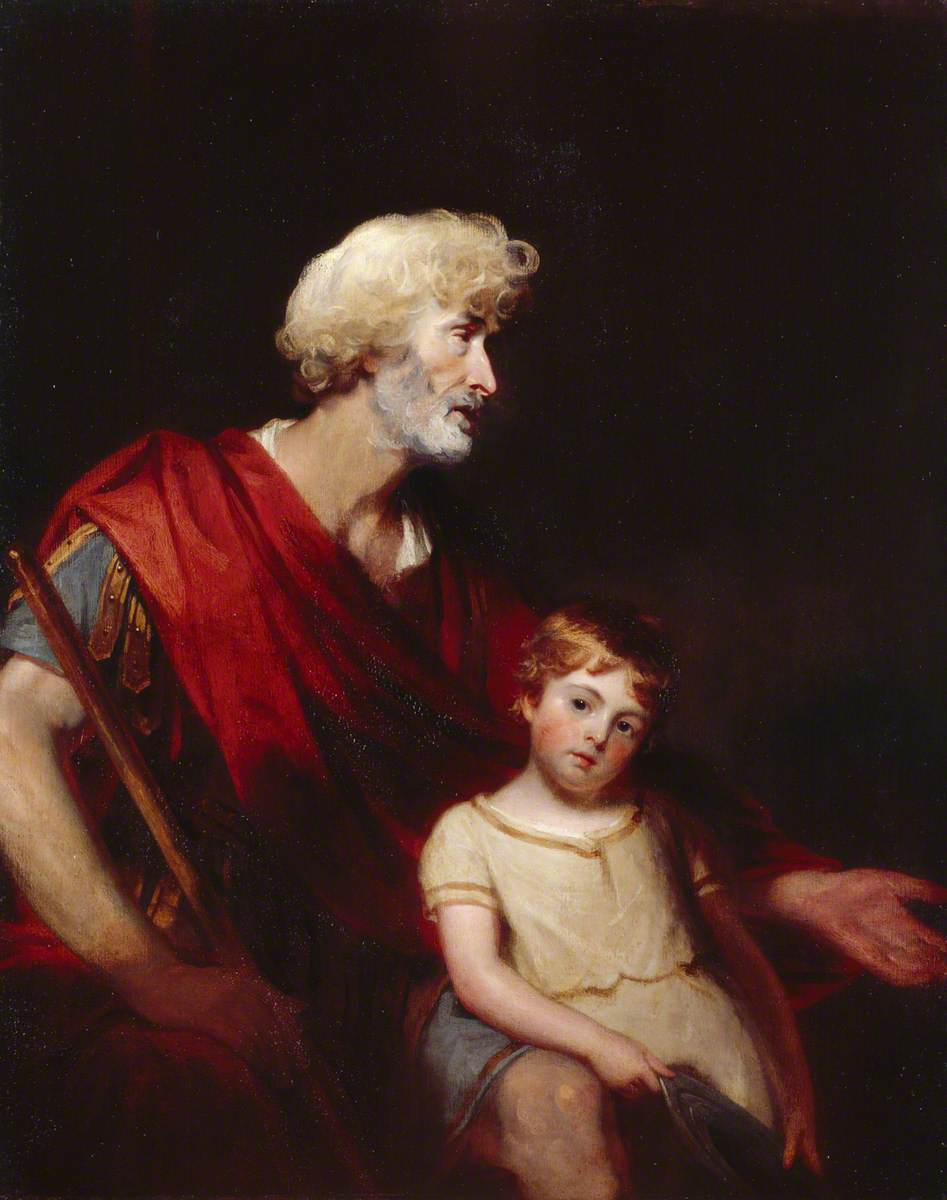
Belisarius, 1809

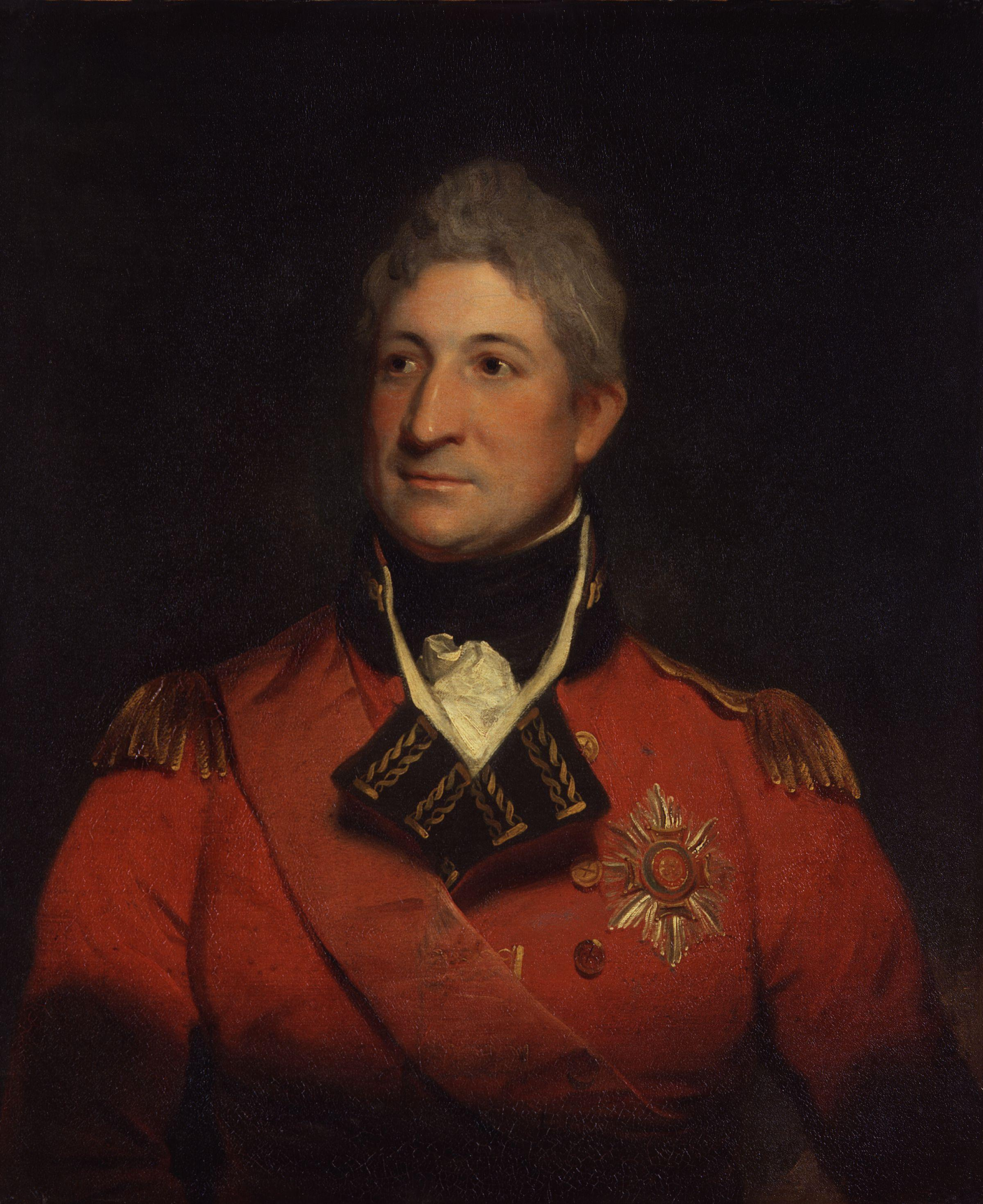
Thomas Picton, 1812

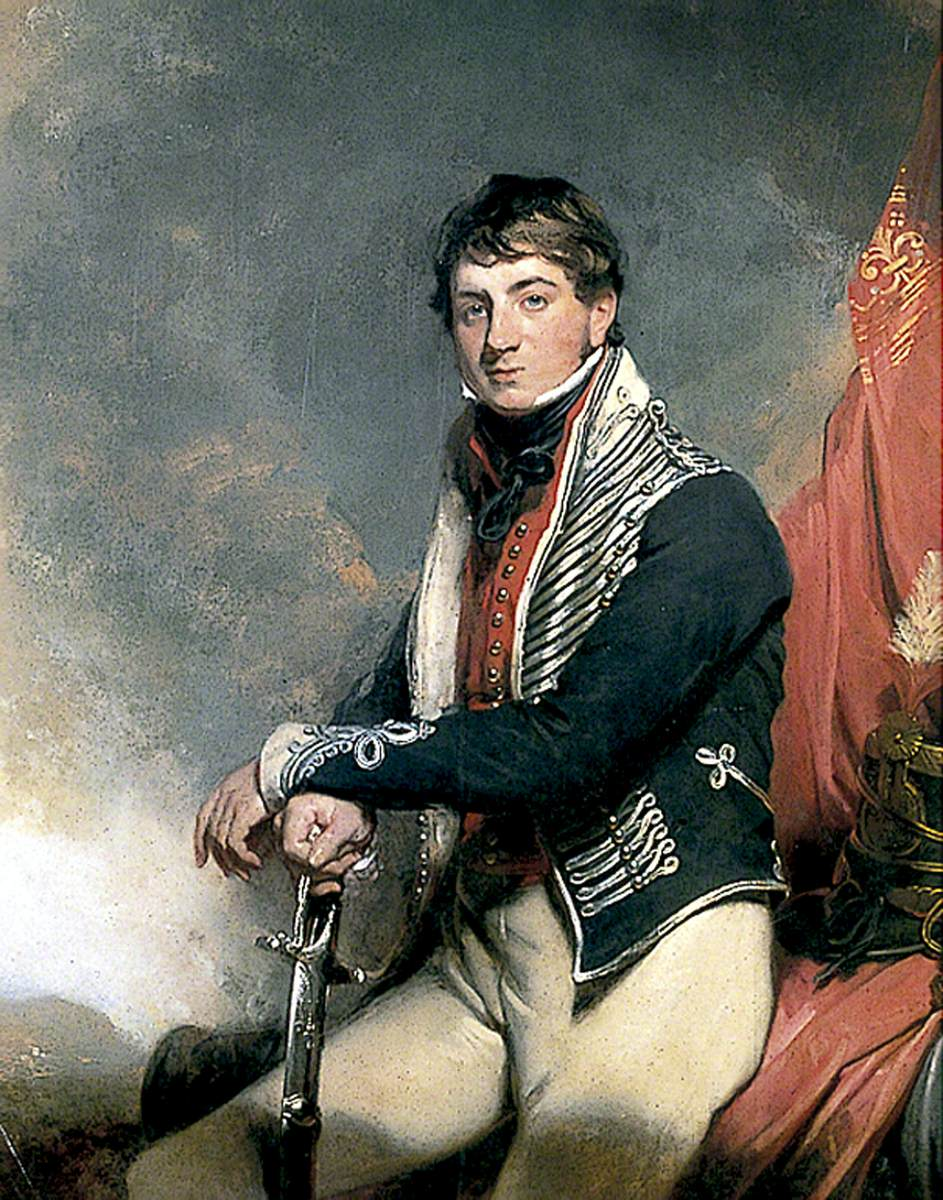
Henry Vassall Webster, c.1814

Edward Kerrison, 1814

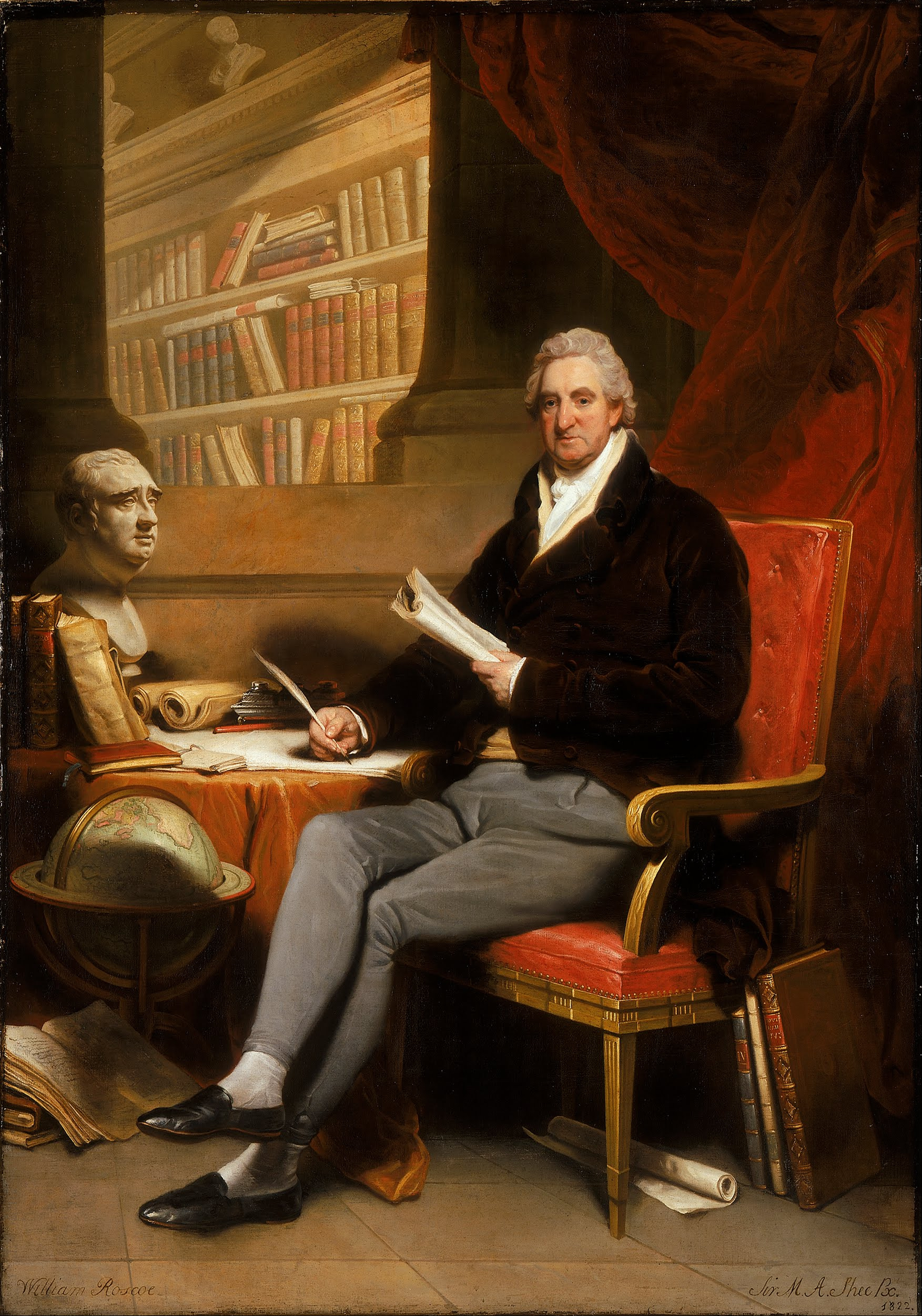
Portrait of William Roscoe, c.1815-17

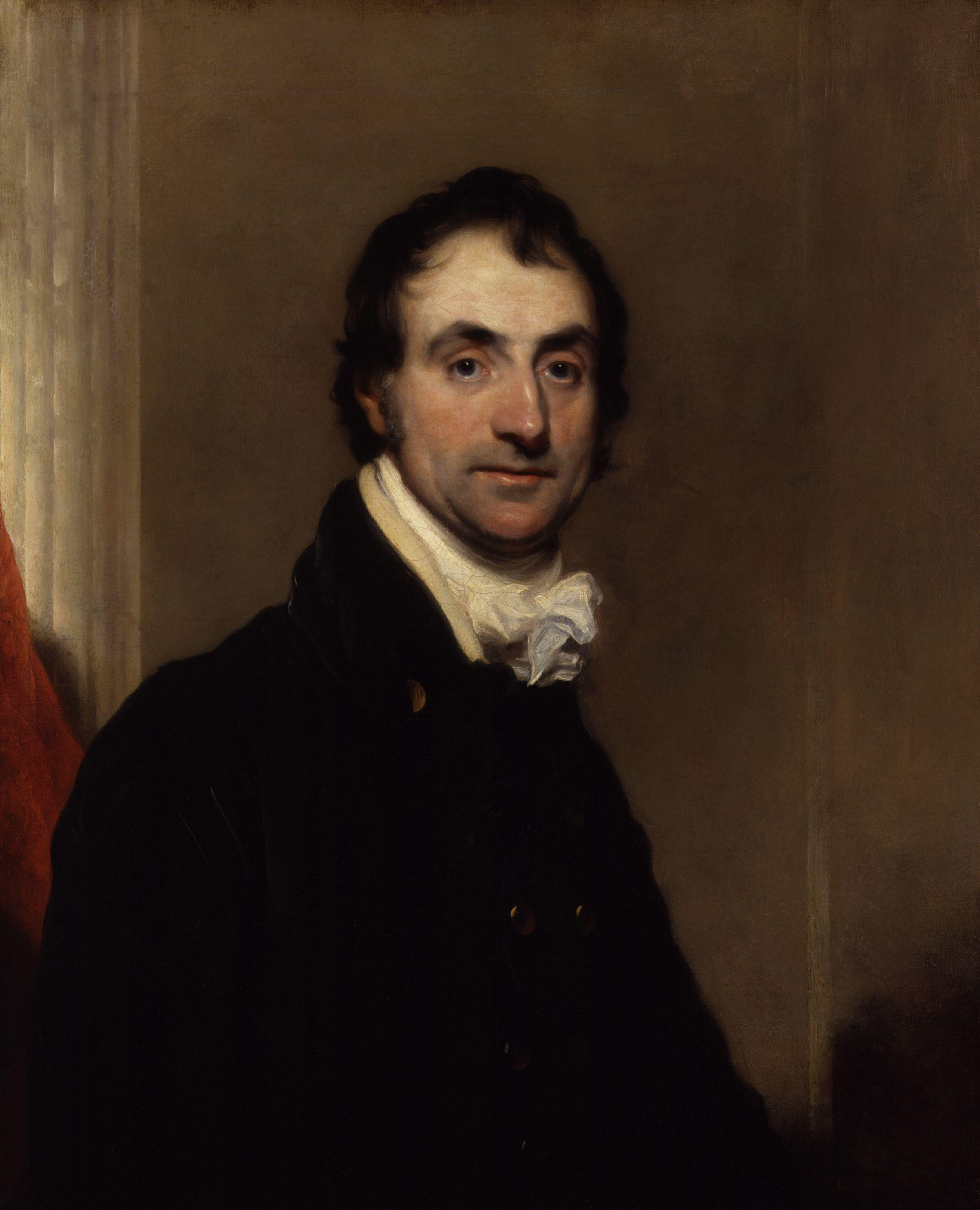
Sharon Turner, 1817

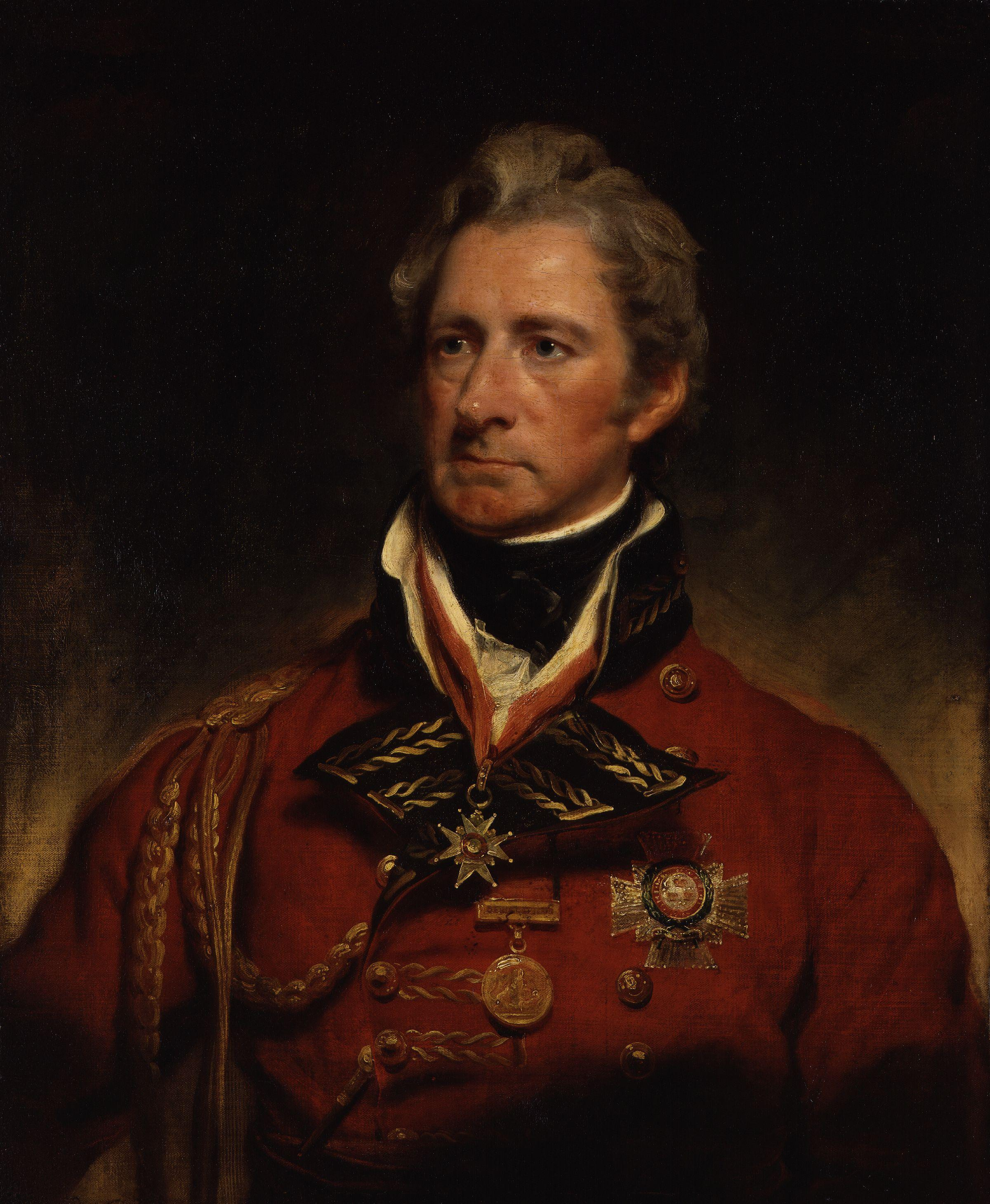
Thomas Munro, 1819

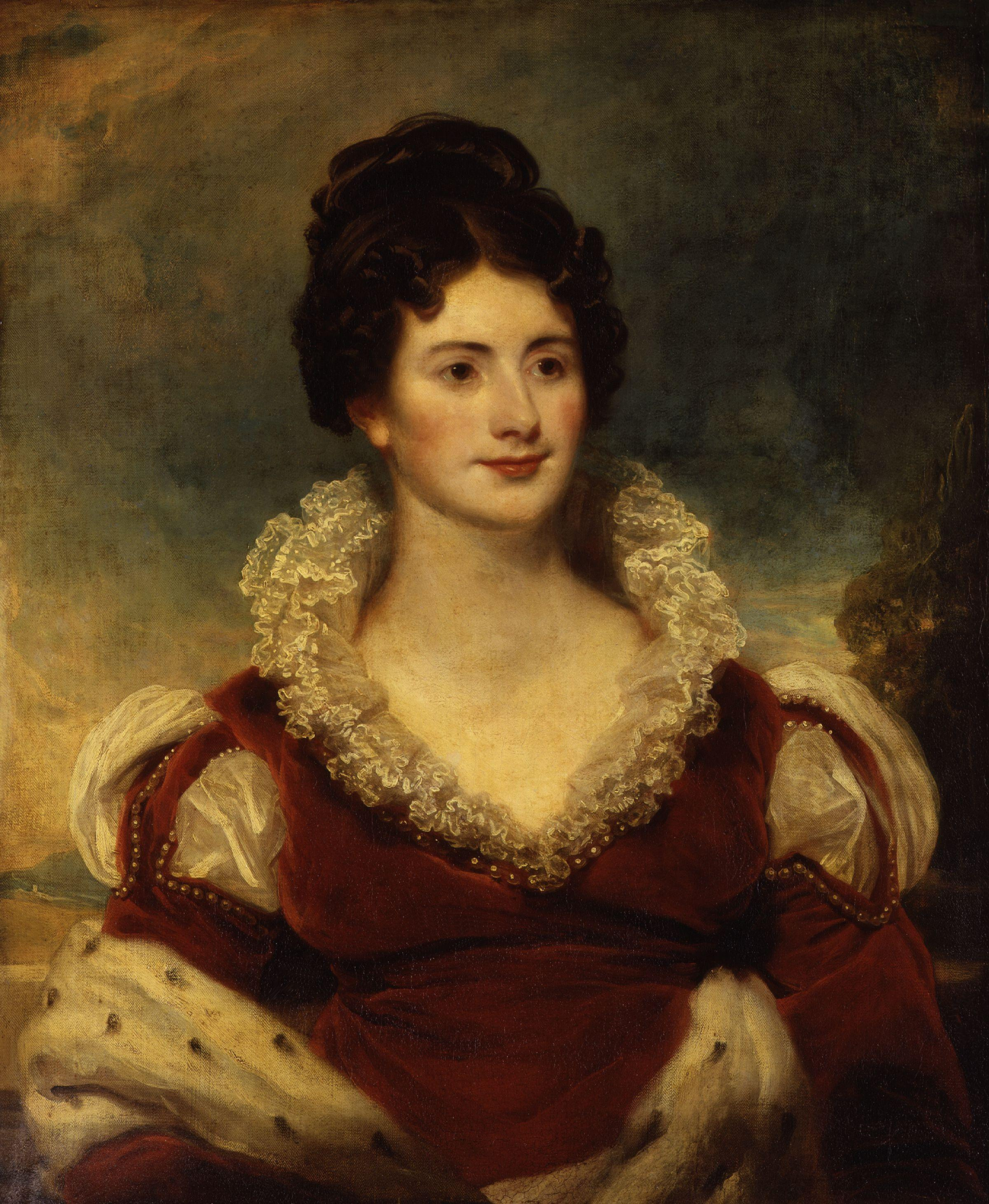
Lady Munro, 1819

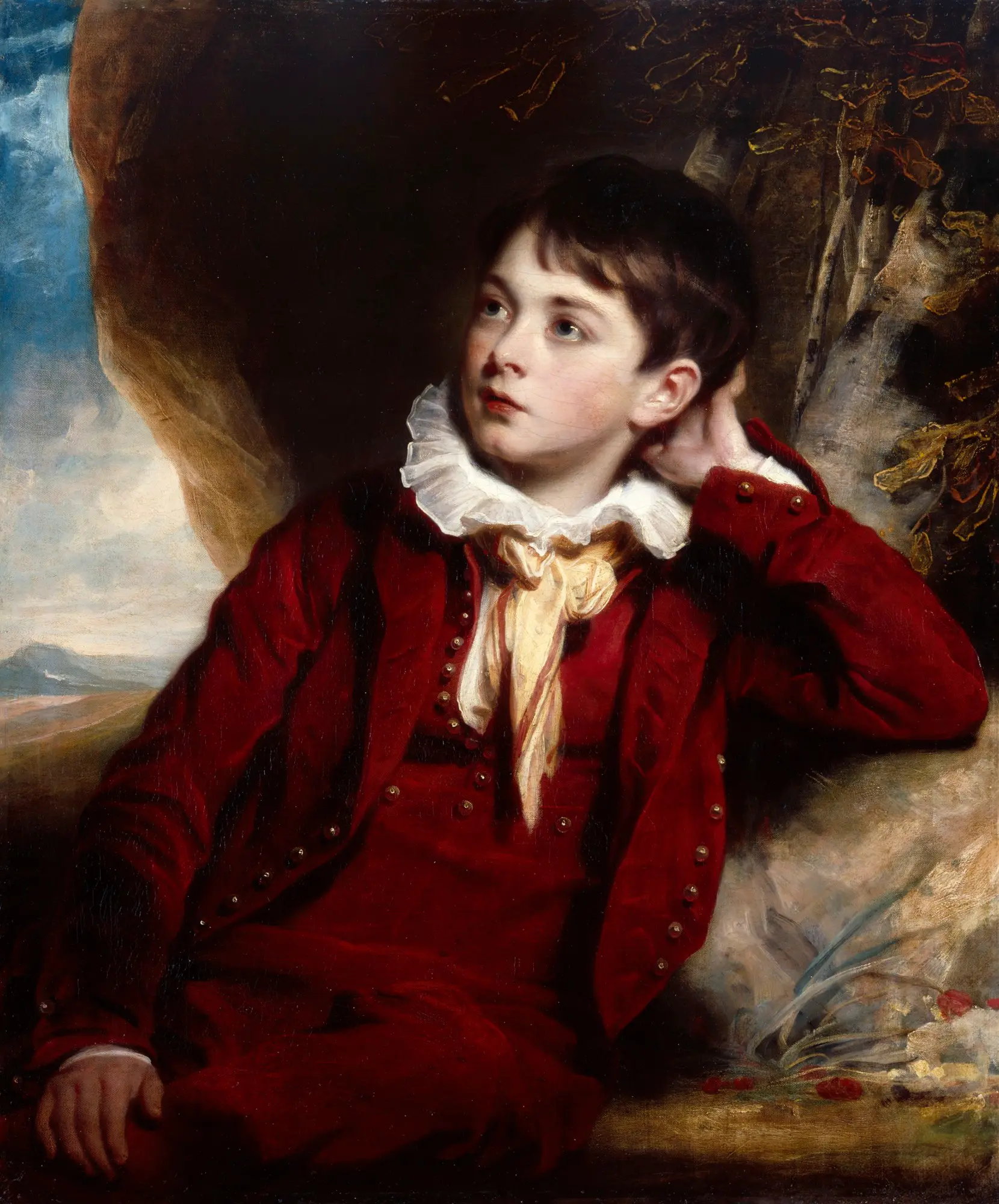
The Painter's Son, 1820

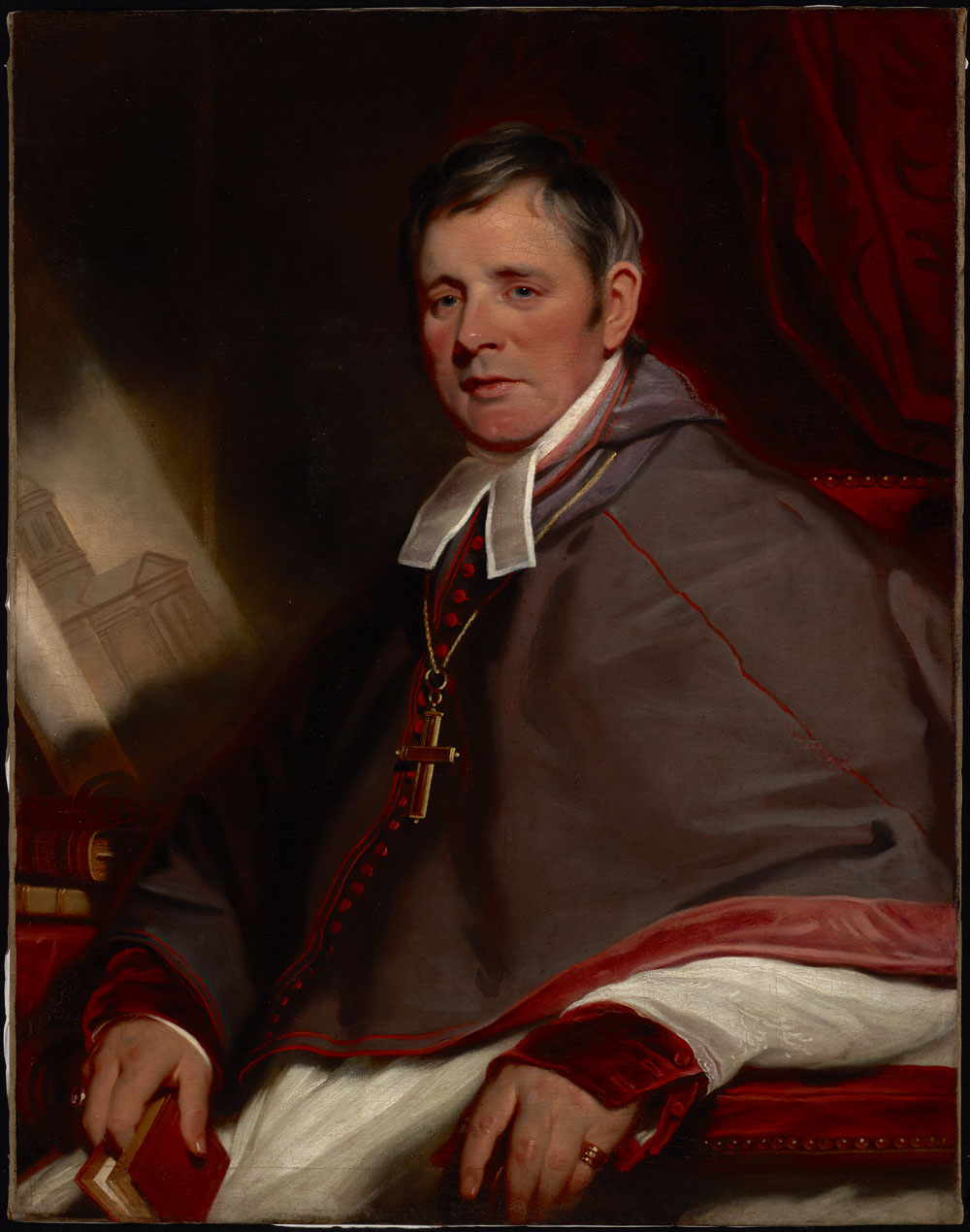
Alexander Macdonell, 1823

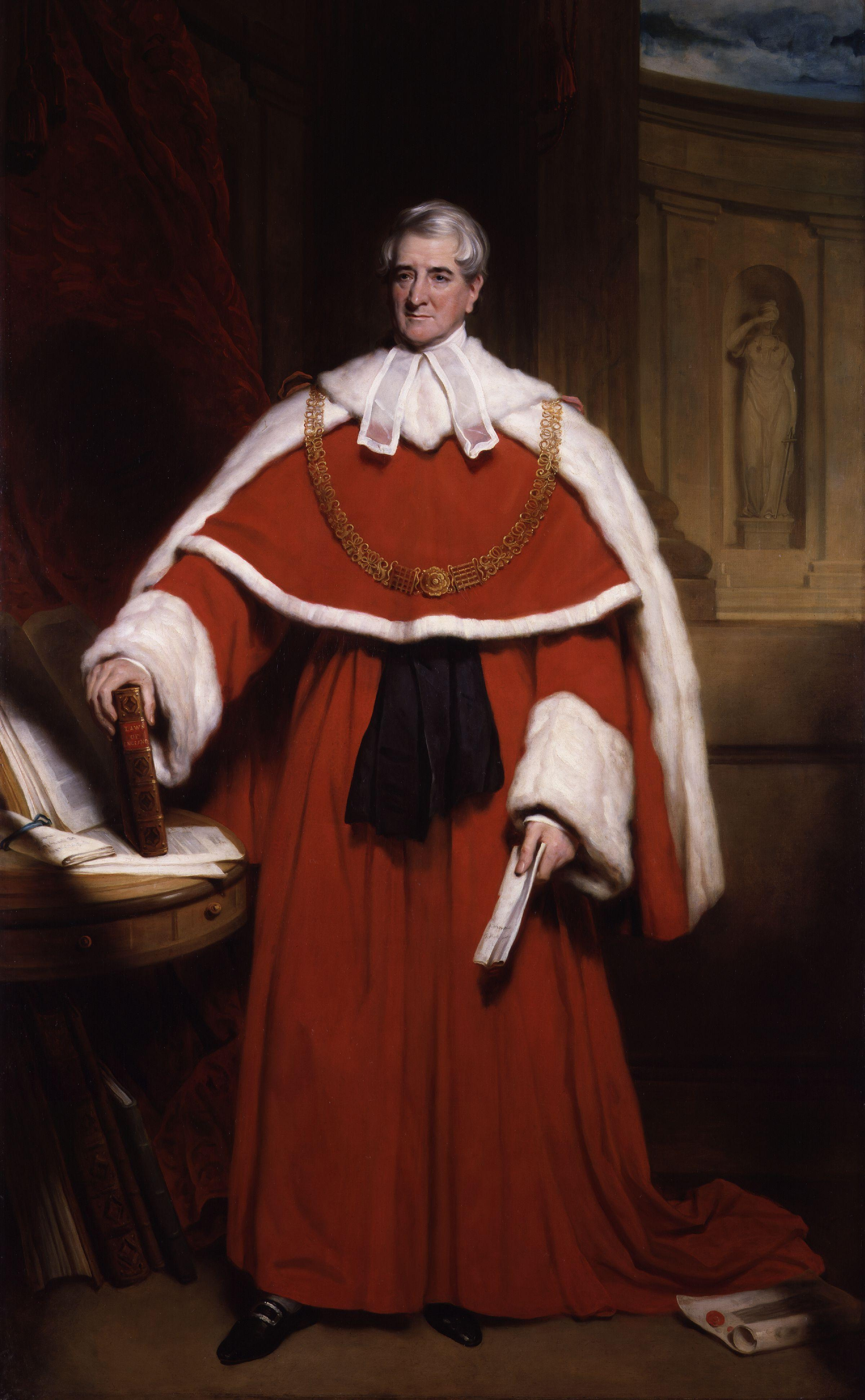
Portrait of Thomas Denman, 1832

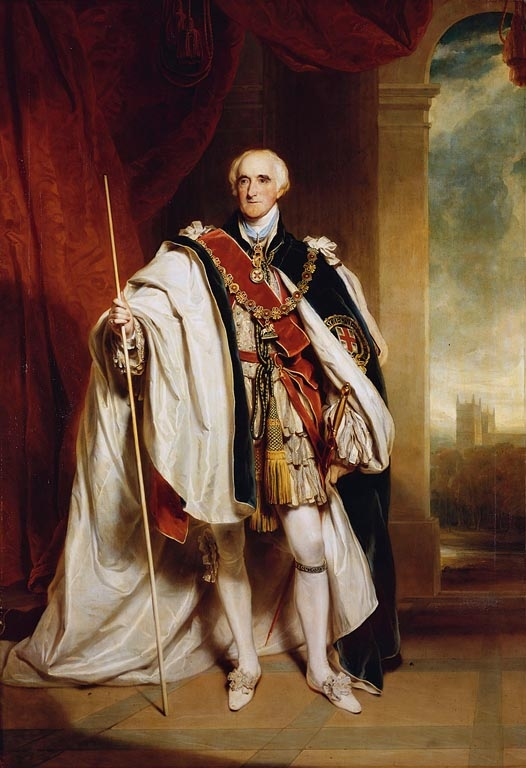
Marquess Wellesley, 1832

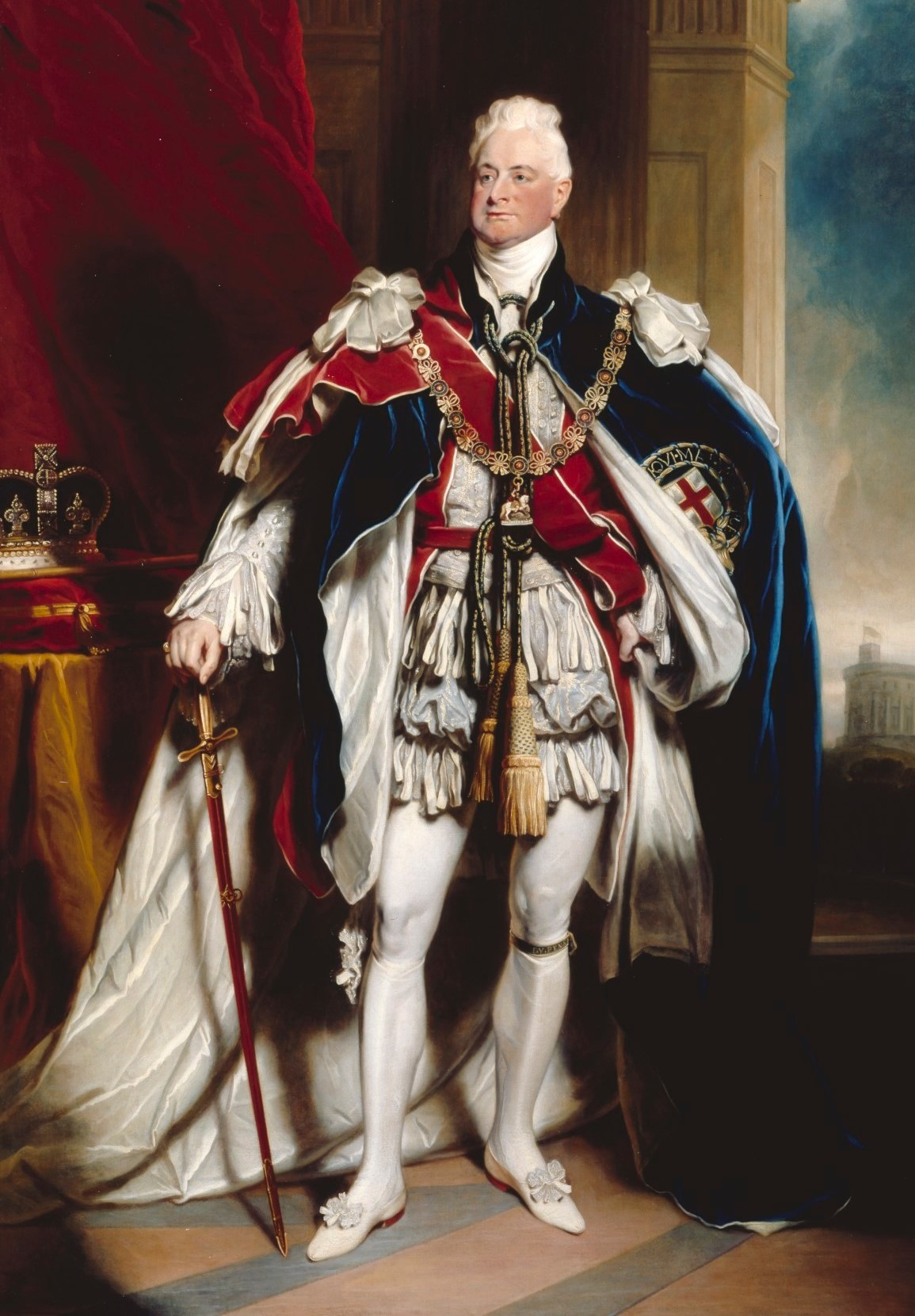
Portrait of William IV, 1833

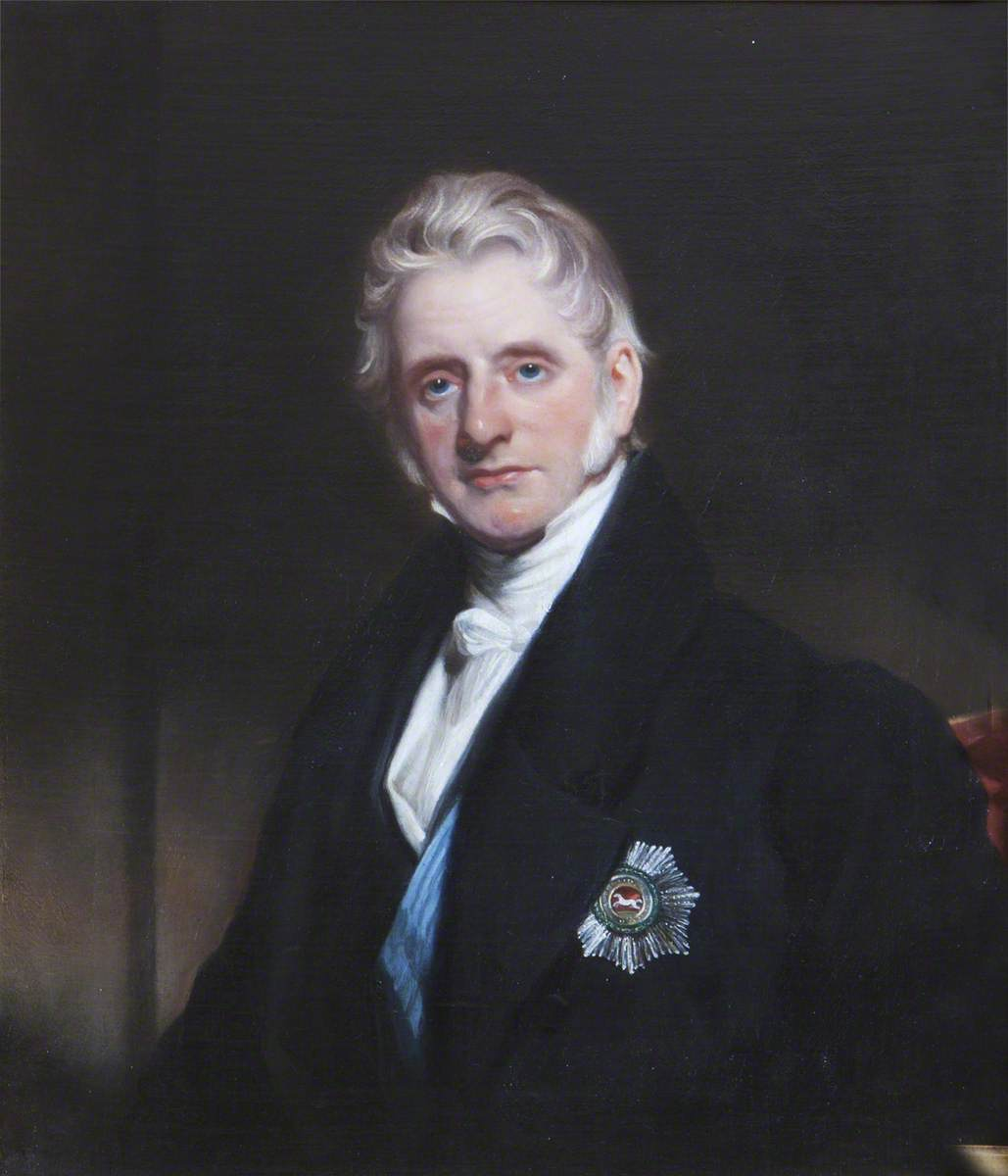
Lord Brownlow, c.1835

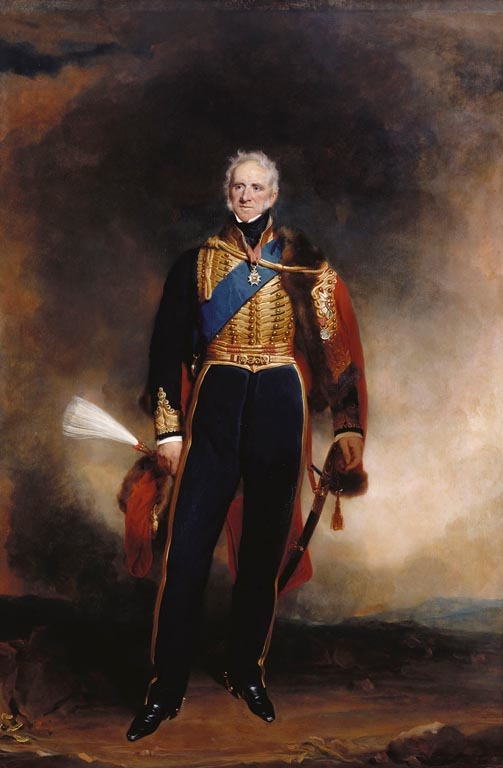
Portrait of the Marquess of Anglesey, 1836

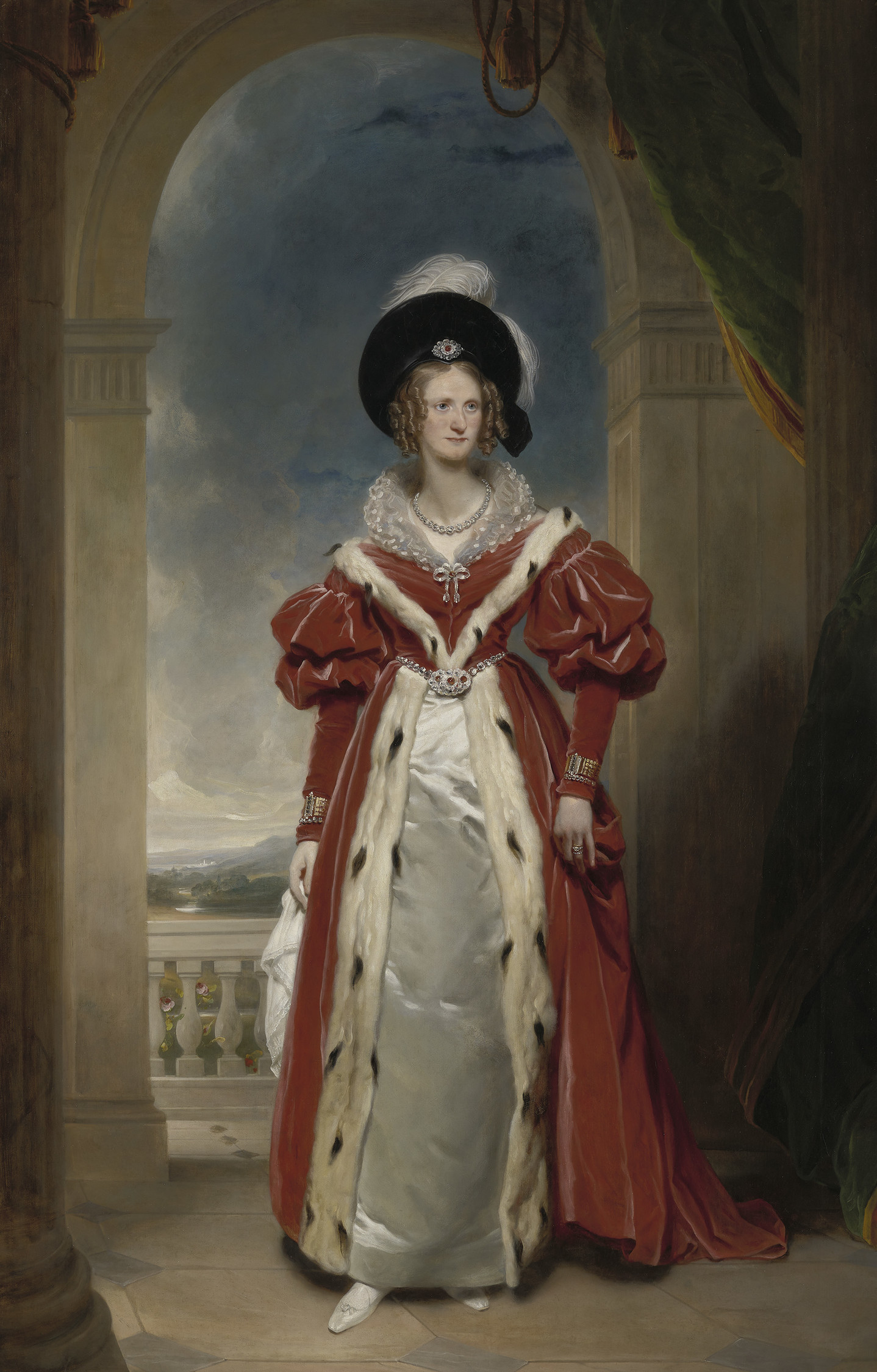
Portrait of Queen Adelaide, 1836

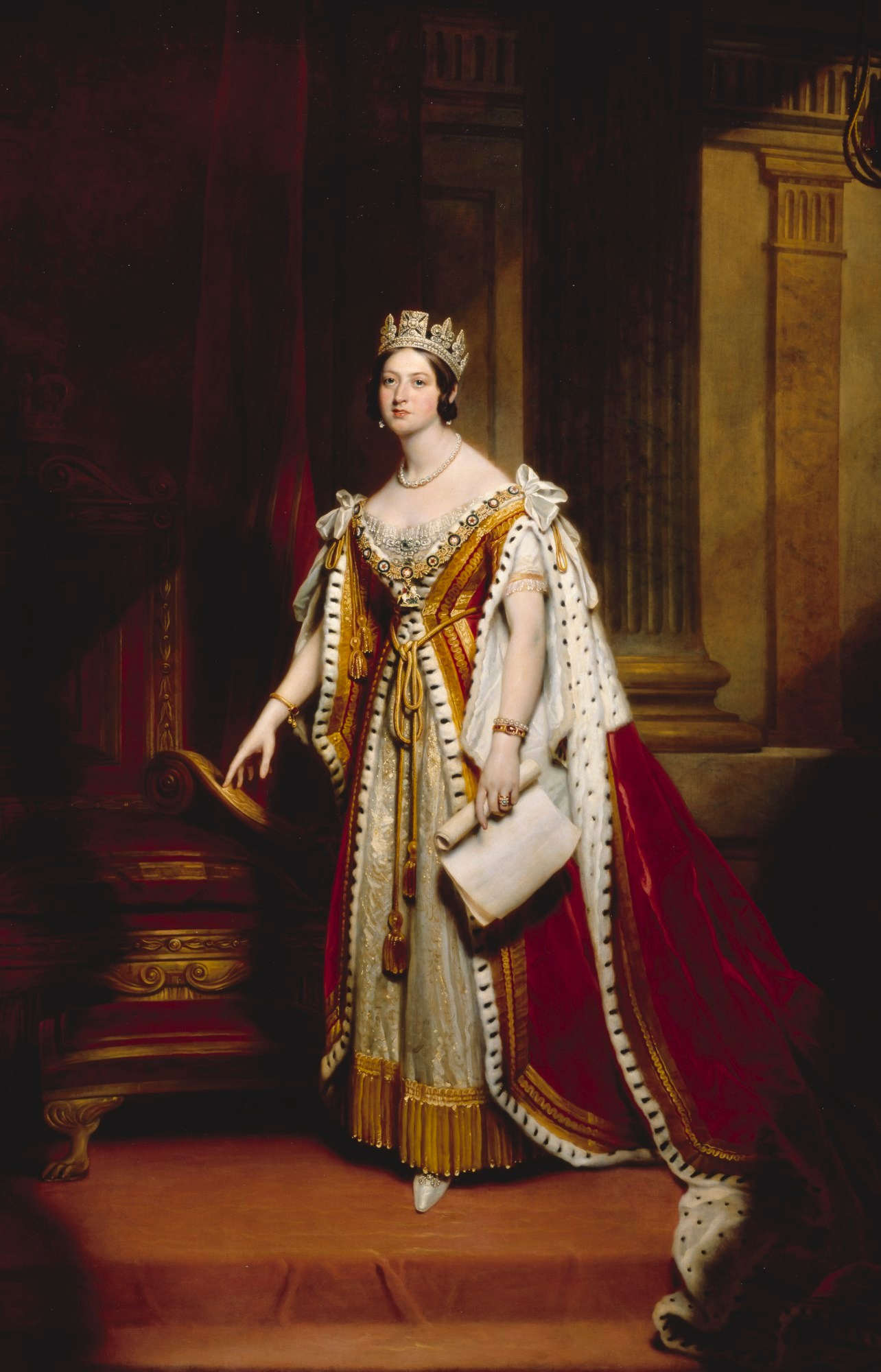
Portrait of Queen Victoria, 1843

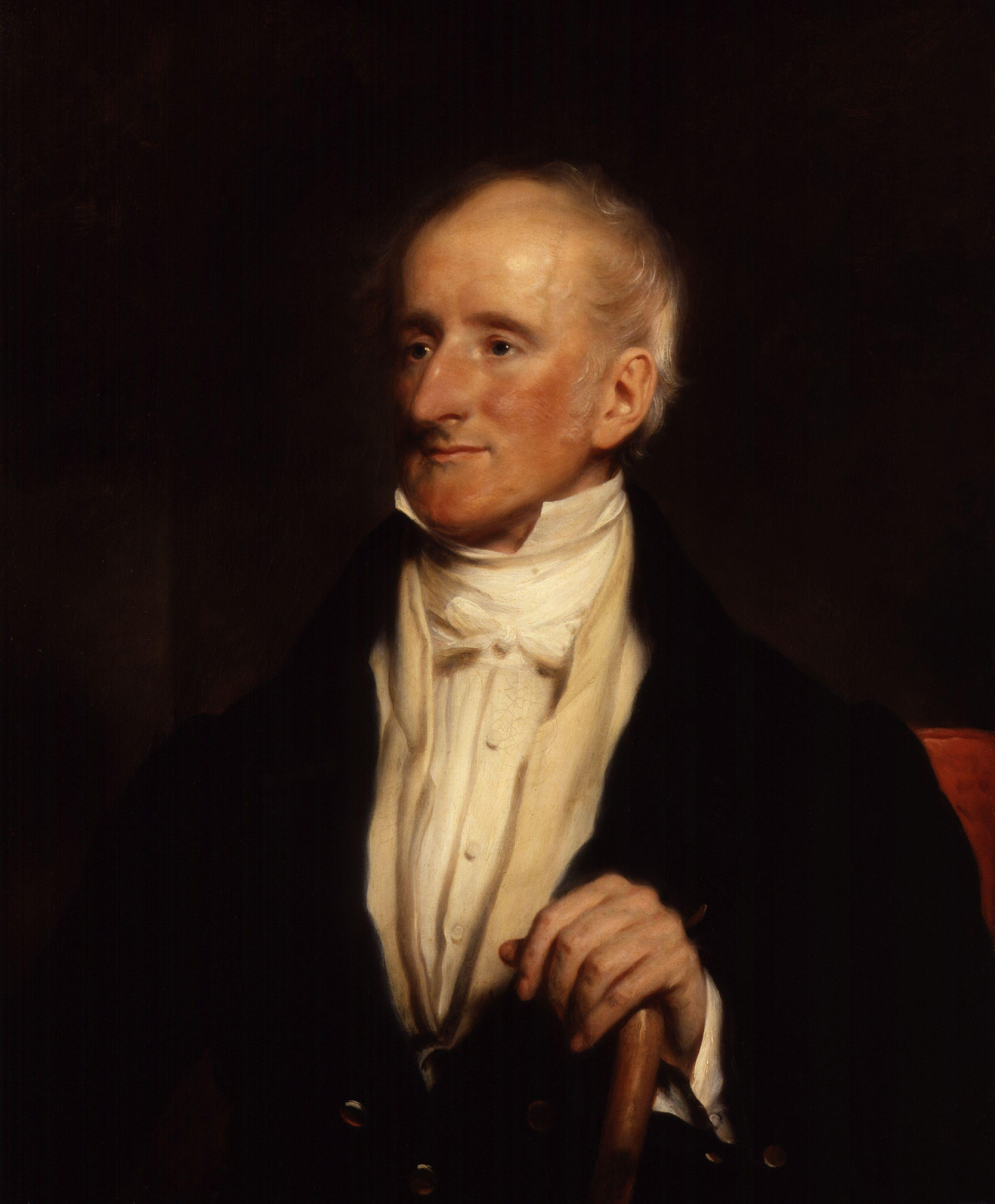
Portrait of Sir Francis Burdett, 1843

== Bibliography ==
- Martin Archer Shee, The Life of Sir Martin Archer Shee, Volume 1, Volume 2 (London: Longman, Green, Longman, and Roberts, 1860).

== Notes ==
Cultural offices
Preceded by Sir Thomas Lawrence	President of the Royal Academy; 1830–1850	Succeeded by Charles Lock Eastlake
