= West Drayton =

Area of the London Borough of Hillingdon

Coordinates: 51.5043°N 0.4646°W

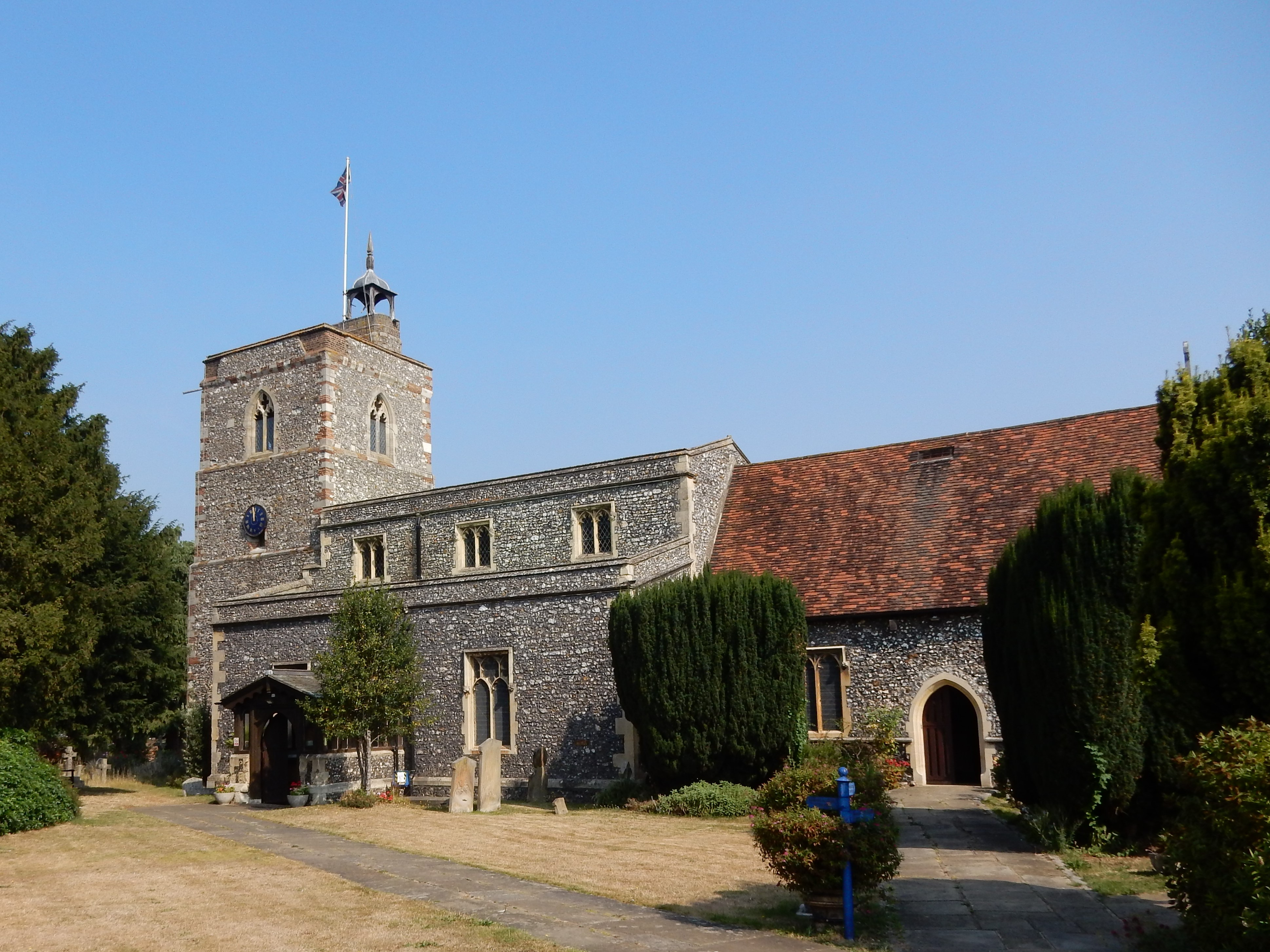
- St Martin's church

- Location within Greater London
- Population: 14,370
- OS grid reference: TQ065795
  - Charing Cross: 14.8 mi (23.8 km) E
- London borough: Hillingdon
- Ceremonial county: Greater London
- Region: London
- Country: England
- Sovereign state: United Kingdom
- Post town: WEST DRAYTON
- Postcode district: UB7
- Dialling code: 01895
- Police: Metropolitan
- Fire: London
- Ambulance: London
- UK Parliament: Hayes and Harlington
- London Assembly: Ealing and Hillingdon

West Drayton is a suburban town in the London Borough of Hillingdon. It was an ancient parish in the county of Middlesex and from 1929 was part of the Yiewsley and West Drayton Urban District, which became part of Greater London in 1965. The settlement is near the Colne Valley Regional Park and its centre lies 1.9 miles (3 km) north of Heathrow Airport.

Traditionally the Parish of West Drayton covers 3.4 square kilometres (1.3 sq mi). In 1901 the population of the civil parish was 984. In the 2021 Census 18,433 people were living in the West Drayton electoral ward. The ward has three councillors in the Hillingdon Borough Council. The vast majority of the housing in West Drayton is mid-20th century.

== Toponymy ==
In 939 the area was known as Draegtun. Tun/ton is cognate with the later form town, but originally implied any kind of farmstead of more than one family. Dray is cognate with draught (as in draft horse/a dray) implying a portage/slope used for dragging loads, or simply notable use of the dragged plough, quite possibly given about 13 other examples in England simply land under till. It is recorded as Draitone in the 1086 Domesday Book, and as Westdrayton in 1465. It is thought that the West may have been added to differentiate the village from Drayton near Ealing.

== Geography ==
West Drayton lies to the south of the Great Western Main Line which run east–west, with Yiewsley lying to the north of the railway line. It lies on the north side of the M4 motorway with the village of Harmondsworth to the south, and is northwest of M4 junction 4 (Heathrow Airport spur). This intersects with the A408 (for Stockley Park and Uxbridge) which forms West Drayton's eastern boundary with Hayes until the Heathrow Express railway line forms this boundary at Prologos Park Heathrow. In this area lay the former hamlet of Stockley, known until 1912 as Starveall or Starvhall. On the western side of West Drayton is the county boundary with Buckinghamshire.

West Drayton railway station is served by the Elizabeth line and Great Western Railway (GWR). The Elizabeth line operates a stopping service between Abbey Wood and Reading and GWR operates a stopping service between London Paddington and Didcot Parkway.

West Drayton has five primary schools, West Drayton Academy, Laurel Lane Primary School, St Martin's CE Primary School, St Catherine Catholic Primary School and Cherry Lane Primary School. The community is served by the Park Academy West London secondary school which is located on Park View Road in Yiewsley.

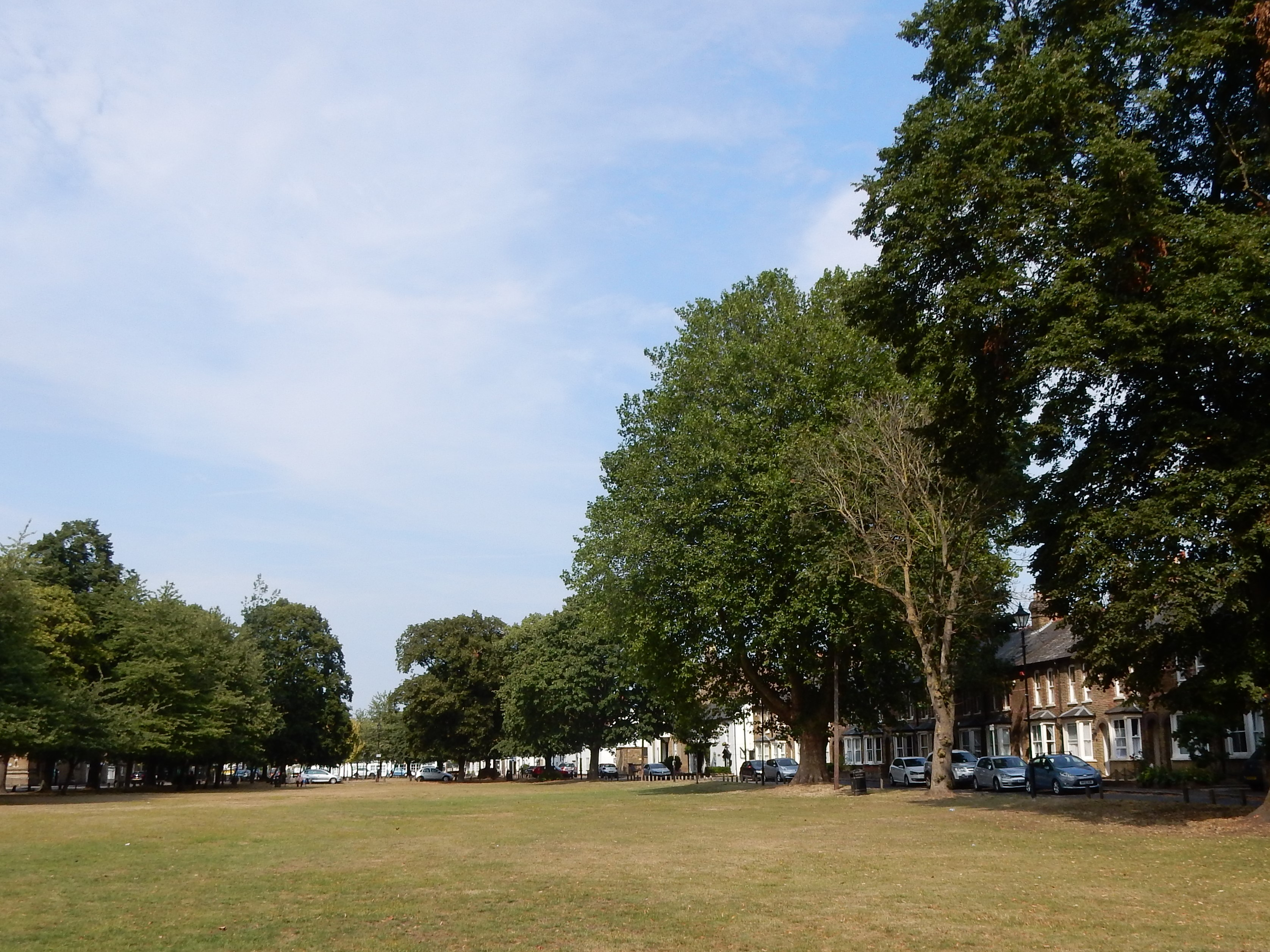
The Green

West Drayton has at its heart in the west of the parish a conservation area, The Green, along which are many buildings protected under UK law by grade II and II* listing – residential and commercial.

== Demography ==
According to the 2021 census 18,433 people were living in the West Drayton ward with 60.5% of the population having been born in the United Kingdom.

The decennial censuses between 1801 and 1901 each show a rise in population and a low population density. From 1801 when the population of the almost identically sized ecclesiastical parish (civil parishes were invented later in the 19th century) was 515; to 1901 when the population of the civil parish was 984.

== Politics ==
West Drayton is part of the Hayes and Harlington constituency for elections to the House of Commons of the United Kingdom.

West Drayton is part of the West Drayton ward for elections to Hillingdon London Borough Council.

On 1 April 1949 the parish was abolished to form Yiewsley and West Drayton. At the 1931 census (the last before the abolition of the parish), West Drayton had a population of 2856.

== History ==
=== St Paul's era 939–1546 ===
The first record of West Drayton is from 939 when Æthelstan, King of the English, gave the Manor of West Drayton to the Dean and Chapter of Cathedral church of St Pauls, recorded in the Cartularium Saxonicum. In the 1086 Domesday Book, West Drayton was assessed at ten hides with land suitable for six ploughs. The Parish had 17 landowners which indicated a population of less than 100. In 1461 a separate smaller manor, Drayton and Colham Garden Manor was first recorded, lying between Swan road and Colham Mill road. Both manors shared St Martin's Parish Church. Until 1525 West Drayton Manor was managed on behalf of the Dean and Chapter of St Paul's by an appointment known as a Firmarius who was responsible for the day-to-day running of the estate.

=== Paget era 1546–1786 ===
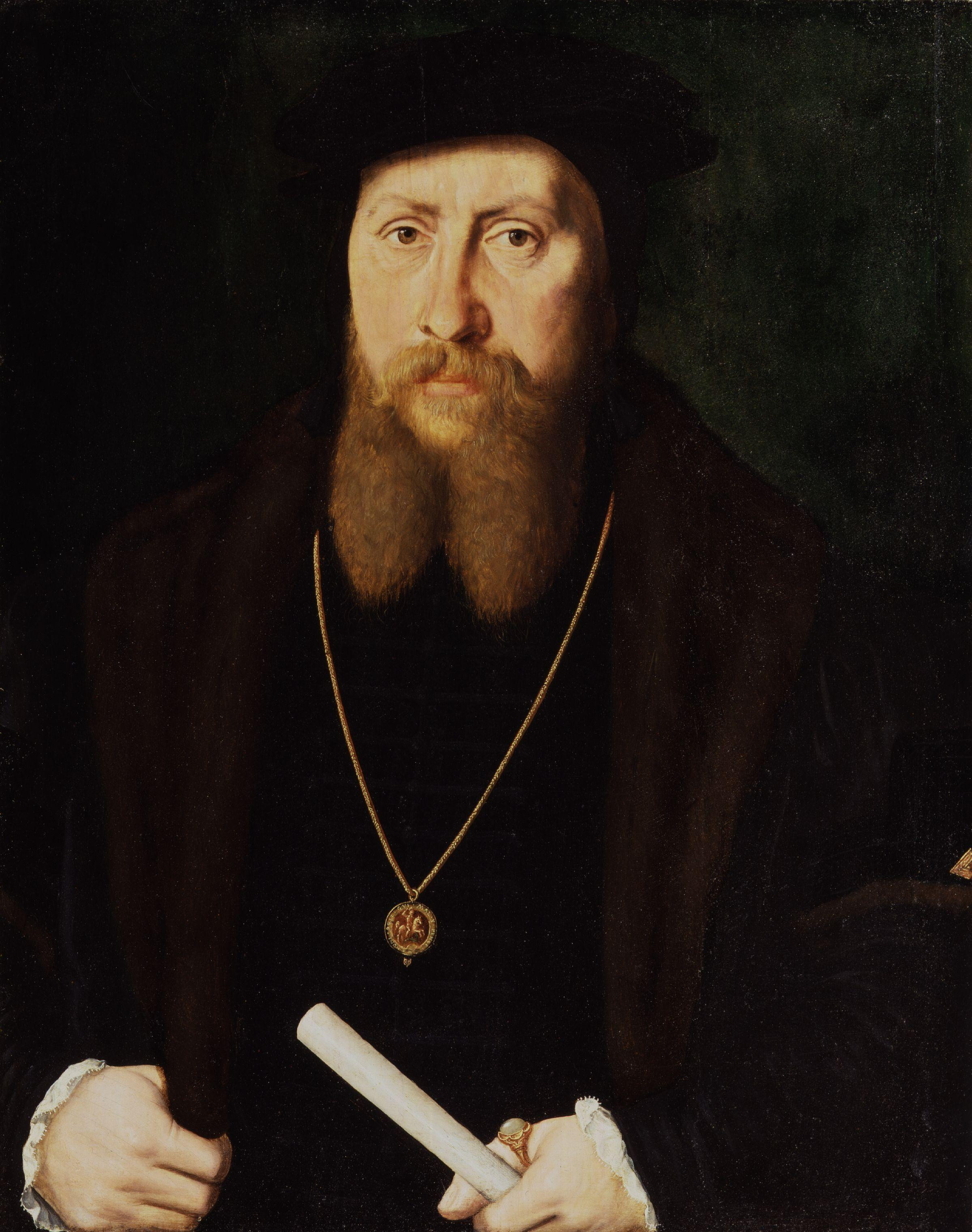
William Paget, 1st Baron Paget.

From 1525 St Paul's began leasing West Drayton Manor to tenants. From 1537 the lessee of the manor was William Paget who held high office of state in the court of Henry VIII. On 1 April 1546, the Dean and Chapter of St Paul's released the Manor of West Drayton to the Crown and two weeks later Henry granted the manor to the now knighted Sir William Paget. In the same year Henry granted Paget six manors in his native Staffordshire. Henry died in January 1547. Paget was made a peer of the realm as Lord Paget of Beaudesert by Edward VI in 1549.

While he was leasing the manor William Paget used the existing building of St Pauls which was situated near St Martin's Parish church. Paget described the building as his "cotage at Drayton". Once owning the manor he built a new manor house, completed by 1549, which occupied the western end of the churchyard. The Manor grounds contained the Church, ornamental gardens, stables, a dovecote and other outbuildings and was enclosed by a high brick wall and two gatehouses. The wall and one of the gatehouses can still be seen today. The construction of the manor house and grounds resulted in the demolition of villagers' homes on Church Road and building on the graves of generations of West Drayton people in the churchyard. In addition to this, Paget enclosed 150 acres of common land to add to his demesne. In 1550 Paget legalised his position by obtaining a royal pardon for his actions. The loss of the Parish churchyard was compensated for by the granting of an alternative burial site which was situated on the eastern side of where Drayton Hall is today. The burial site was used until 1888.

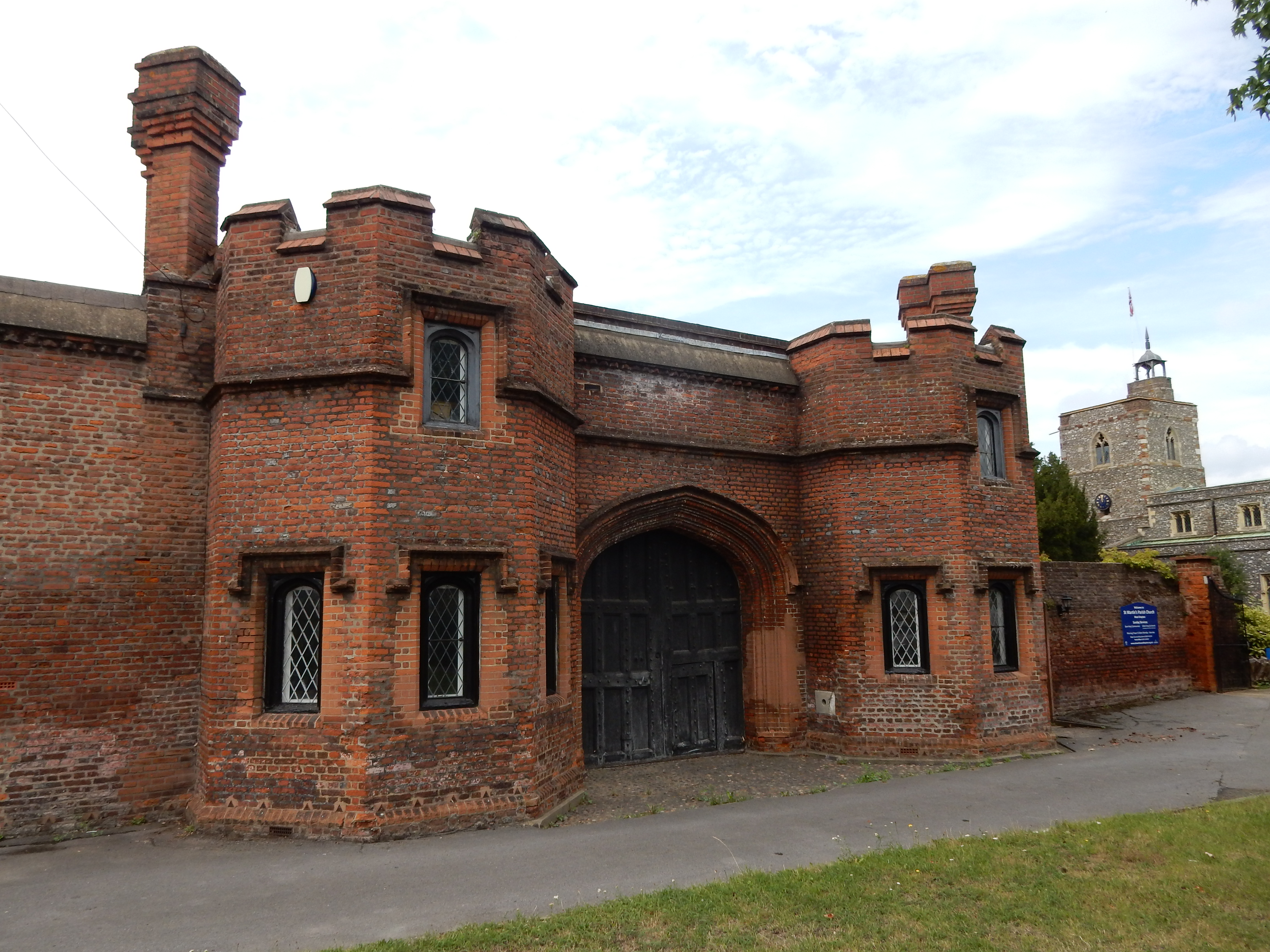
Gatehouse to the former West Drayton Manor House

After serving as Lord Privy Seal under Mary I, poor health meant William Paget played little part in public life after the accession of Queen Elizabeth I in 1558, although as a Privy Councillor his advice was often sought. He died in West Drayton on 9 June 1563. He was succeeded by his son Henry, who died five years later without male issue. Henry's brother Thomas became the 3rd Baron Paget in 1568.

Thomas Paget (1544–1590) and his brother Charles were both devout Roman Catholics, and would not conform to the Protestant religion of Queen Elizabeth I. Aided by Henry Percy, Paget fled to Paris on the uncovering of the Throckmorton Plot in November 1583, joining Charles who had been in exile there since 1581. The failed conspiracy's plan was for an invasion of England by French forces under the command of Henry, Duke of Guise, financed by Philip II of Spain. English Catholics would then rise up and depose Elizabeth, placing Catholic Mary, Queen of Scots on the English throne.

After his flight to France Elizabeth issued a proclamation commanding Thomas Paget to return to England. In June 1584 a formal demand for the surrender of Paget was made to Henry III, King of France through the English ambassador, which was not carried out.

In 1584 or 1585 Philip II made the decision for Spain to invade England and depose Queen Elizabeth. The ground invasion would be led by Alexander Farnese, Duke of Parma with the majority of troops coming from the Spanish Netherlands. Parma commanded the Army of Flanders which was engaged in fighting England's Protestant Dutch allies.

Paget travelled to Spain and was given a pension of 180 crowns per month by Philip II. He then moved to the Spanish Netherlands where he was consulted by Parma in the planning of the invasion. The endeavour of July–August 1588 to stop England's rise as a maritime power and to force the English and Welsh back to Roman Catholicism failed when the Spanish Armada required to support Parma's passage from the Spanish Netherlands to England was scattered after engagements with the English Navy off the coast of Calais and Gravelines. Thomas Paget would die in Brussels in 1590.

In 1587 Thomas Paget had been attainted of treason by act of parliament. His lands including West Drayton were confiscated by the Crown. Elizabeth granted the manor to her Lord Chancellor, Sir Christopher Hatton for life. Hatton died in 1591 and from 1592 the manor was leased to her Lord Chamberlain, George Carey. Carey became 2nd Baron Hunsdon in 1596 and entertained Elizabeth at the West Drayton Manor House in October 1602.

In the next year 1603, both Elizabeth and George Carey died. With Elizabeth's death, James I, son of Mary Queen of Scots acceded to the English throne. In 1604 James restored the Paget family lands and honours to Thomas Paget's son William. William like James I was a Protestant and had taken part in the successful Anglo-Dutch capture of Cádiz (Gades) in 1596 with Admiral Charles Howard, Sir Walter Raleigh and Robert Devereux, 2nd Earl of Essex. It is believed William Paget received possession of West Drayton Manor in 1610. In 1612 William Paget became an 'Adventurer' (shareholder) and member of the Council of the Virginia Company (London Company) and the Somers Isles Company. The Paget Parish and Paget Island in Bermuda are named after him. He died on 29 August 1629 and is buried in the vault of St Martin's church.

William Paget's son, William Paget, 5th Baron Paget, (1609–1678) was among the Peers who petitioned King Charles I on 18 August 1640 to summon a parliament for the redress of grievances. However at the start of the Civil War he did not wish to take up arms against the king and joined him at York in June 1642. He raised a regiment of foot which fought for the King at the battle of Edgehill on 23 Oct 1642. In 1643/44 he was with the King at Oxford. Paget had his estates sequestered by Parliament and was fined £500 for supporting the King. He died in October 1678 and is buried in the vault of St Martin's church.

William's son, William Paget, 6th Baron Paget, (1637–1713) was appointed by William III as English Ambassador to Vienna (1689–1692) and Ambassador-Extraordinary to Constantinople (1692–1702). He was joint chairman at the congress of Karlowitz which resulted in the Treaty of Karlowitz of 26 January 1699 which brought peace between the Holy League and the Ottoman Empire after the 15 year Great Turkish War.

The Paget coat of arms

The Paget heraldic eagle in the coat of arms of the London Borough of Hillingdon

In 1714 William's son, Henry Paget the 7th Lord Paget,(1663–1743), was created 1st Earl of Uxbridge by George I. Paget was a member of the Privy Council and the town of Uxbridge, Massachusetts is named in his honour. He died at West Drayton on 30 August 1743 and was buried at Hillingdon Church.

Henry Paget was succeeded by his grandson, Henry Paget, 2nd Earl of Uxbridge (1719–1769). In 1755 Dawley House was acquired and the West Drayton Manor house was demolished around this time. Henry Paget died childless on 16 November 1769 and was buried in the vault of St Martin's Church. The title of 9th Baron Paget was given to Henry Bayly, whose name was changed to Henry Paget by Royal License in 1770. He was created 1st Earl of Uxbridge (Second creation) in May 1784. On 21 October 1786 Henry Bayly-Paget sold the Manor of West Drayton to Fysh Burgh (Born Fysh Coppinger) of Lincoln's Inn, for £12,000 ending the Paget family's relationship with West Drayton.

=== De Burgh era 1786–1939 ===
Fysh Burgh, a London merchant, purchased West Drayton Manor in 1786. He had been born Fysh Coppinger, but took the name Burgh sometime after 1773 by proving descent from Sir Thomas Burgh of Gainsborough. In December 1790 he adopted the form De Burgh. As the West Drayton manor house had been demolished around 1755 he took the seventeenth century mansion, Drayton Hall as his family home.

Fysh De Burgh died in Bath on 14 January 1800 and was buried in the family vault in St Martin's church. His only son had died in January 1793 so he held his estates in trust for his married daughter Catherine, who assumed the name De Burgh. Fysh De Burgh's widow, Easter De Burgh, held a life interest in the estates and on her death in 1823 the manor passed to her grandson, Hubert De Burgh. Hubert's Lordship of the Manor would last nearly fifty years. He became good friends with ex-Emperor of the French Napoleon III becoming his Master of the Horse. Hubert entertained Napoleon III at Drayton Hall in 1872. The visit is recalled in the name of Napoleon Cottages on Money Lane. Hubert De Burgh died at his London house in Hans Place on 25 September 1872. He was buried in the De Burgh family vault in St Martin's Church on 10 October 1872. The Uxbridge Yeomanry Cavalry which he had commanded, escorted his coffin from Drayton Hall to the church where the 24th Uxbridge Rifles fired a salute.

The Lordship of the Manor then passed to Hubert's son, Francis de Burgh who served in the 11th Hussars. Francis would die without issue in 1874 at the age of 35. The manor passed jointly to his two sisters Minna Edith Elizabeth and Eva Elizabeth.

In the late nineteenth and early twentieth centuries the De Burgh estates were sold off gradually, mainly for building purposes. Eva Elizabeth De Burgh was sole owner of Drayton Hall when she died unmarried on 4 February 1939 at the age of 87. She was buried in the vault of St Martin's church on 8 February 1939 ending the 152 year De Burgh family connection with West Drayton.

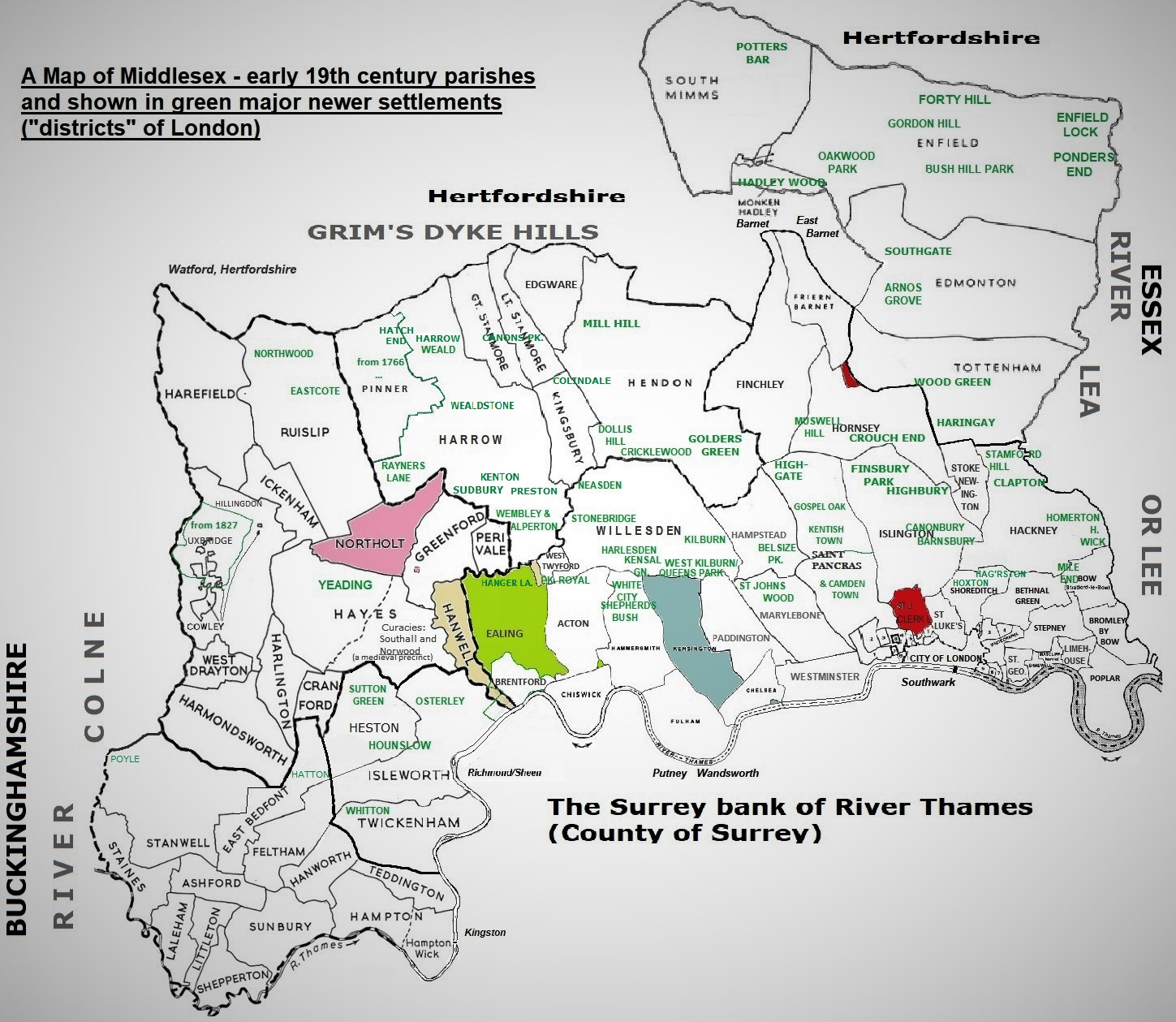
The Parish of West Drayton within Middlesex in the early 19th century

=== St Martin's Church ===
West Drayton's parish church, dedicated to Martin of Tours, was first mentioned in the 12th century. However, no trace of the original church remains. The present church was first built in the 13th century, of which the base of the tower, the piscina and the north chancel wall are incorporated in the present building, which dates from the 15th century. The church was heavily restored and reordered in 1974, when the altar was resited at the west end. The baptismal font is a splendid example of mid-15th century work, and the parish chest is early 17th century. There are monumental brasses to Richard Roose (1406), Margaret Burnell (1529), her son John Burnell (1551) and Dr James Good (1581, a physician to Mary, Queen of Scots). There is a small memorial tablet to George Carey, 2nd Baron Hunsdon (1547–1603) who was Lord of West Drayton Manor between 1592 and 1603. Carey's father was Queen Elizabeth I's cousin. The memorial states how 'bountiful' he was to the poor of the Parish. In his will Hunsdon left the sum of 'one hundred marks for the benefit of the poor of West Drayton for ever.' This is one of the oldest West Drayton Parish charities and its small income is still distributed each New Year's Day.

=== St Catherine's Catholic Church ===
After the Potato Famine of the 1840s (known in Ireland as the Great Famine or Great Hunger), Irish immigrants who were of the Roman Catholic religion and principally from counties Cork and Waterford arrived in West Drayton and took up residence in poor housing by The Green which became known locally as the Irish hovels. Today this is the site of Daisy Villas. Work for the Irish immigrants was found in the market-gardens surrounding West Drayton.

The nearest official place of Catholic worship was St. Mary's chapel at North Hyde, requiring a walk of over four miles each way to attend Mass on a Sunday. Because of this distance a Roman Catholic Mass was offered in a stable at the back of the Kings Head Public House adjacent to The Green. By 1862 the Reverend Andrew Mooney, priest at the St. Mary's North Hyde Orphanage was using a cottage in Money Lane called the 'White House' as a school and was conducting services there. He was succeeded by the Reverend Peter Francis Elkins, also the priest at the North Hyde Mission to which the school at West Drayton was attached.

On 30 May 1867 West Drayton became a Catholic Mission with the Rev. Elkins becoming the resident priest. In July 1867 Rev. Elkins petitioned the Archbishop of Westminster to support the building of a church and school. The building of a church and school was given the special approbation of the Archbishop.

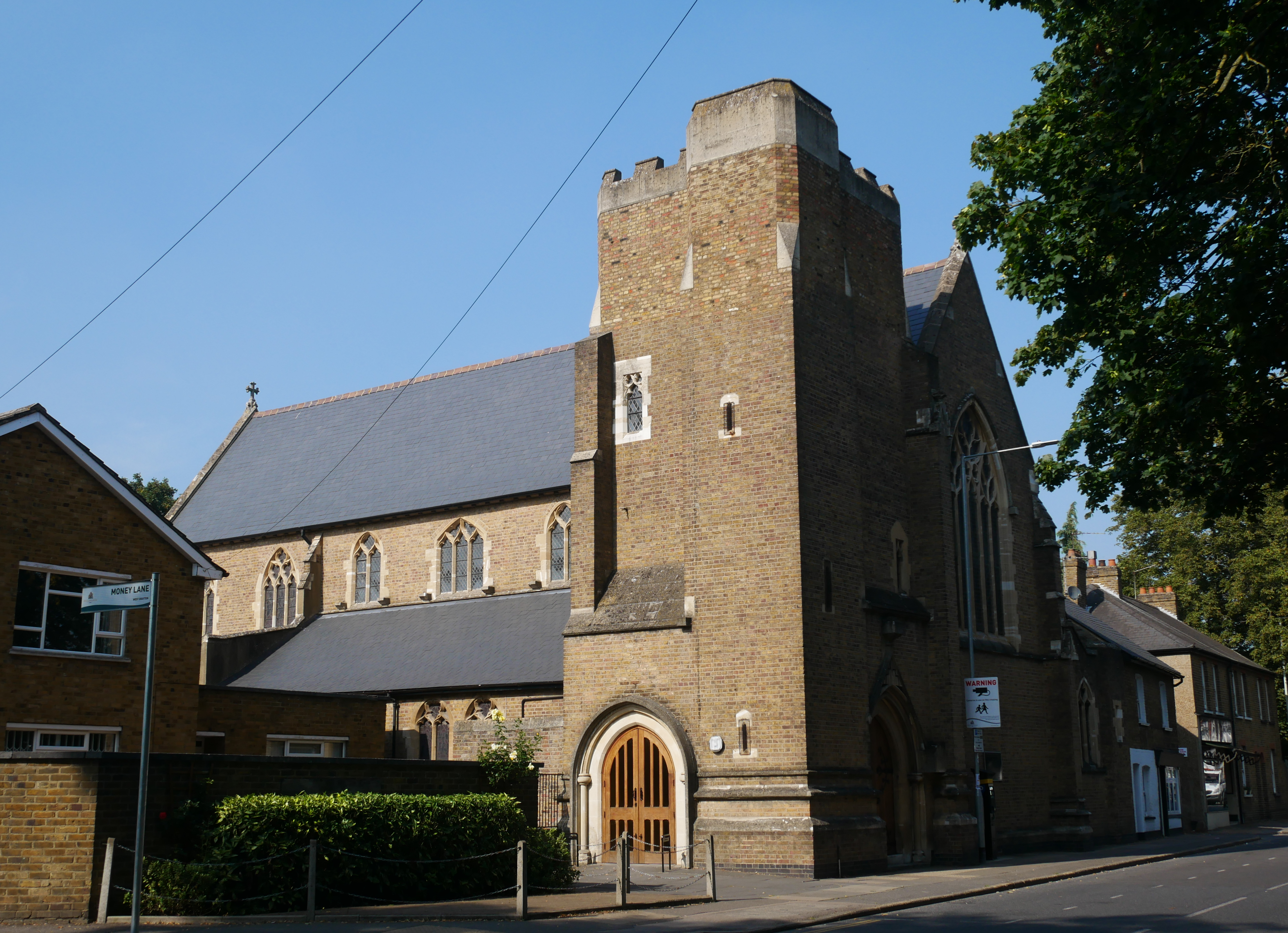
St Catherine's Church

By September 1867 Rev. Elkins health had failed and the West Drayton Mission was undertaken by Reverend Michael Wren. Through the autumn, winter and spring of 1867-8 Rev. Wren requested financial donations for the new church and school stating that West Drayton was the most destitute mission in England with upwards of 300 persons being compelled to remain in the open air during Catholic mass.

On 19 December 1867 a house and land for the church and school was purchased at public auction for £855. Rev. Wren used the house as his Presbytery and a temporary chapel was created in the adjoining coach-house and stables. Premises at the back of the property were demolished to make room for the school.

On 26 October 1868 the Most Reverend Dr. Henry Manning, Archbishop of Westminster laid the foundation stone of the Church of St Catherine of Alexandria. On 29 September 1869 he opened the church, preaching its first sermon.

Despite Rev. Wren's efforts in seeking donations, a loan was required to fund the building of the church and school. This debt resulted in the church not being consecrated until 29 September 1893, twenty-four years after its opening. Both the opening and consecration of the church occurred on 29 September, Michaelmas, the feast of St. Michael, Rev. Michael Wren's patron saint.

The church is built of buff stock brick with Bath stone dressing with dimensions of 85ft by 48ft and was designed by architects Samuel Joseph Nicholl and Thomas John Willson of London in the English Gothic style of the early 14th century. It was fitted to accommodate 500 persons and was constructed by builders James and William Fassnidge of Uxbridge. The schoolroom was 40ft long and 20ft broad and accommodated 250 children and was in use until 1939.

== Local economy ==
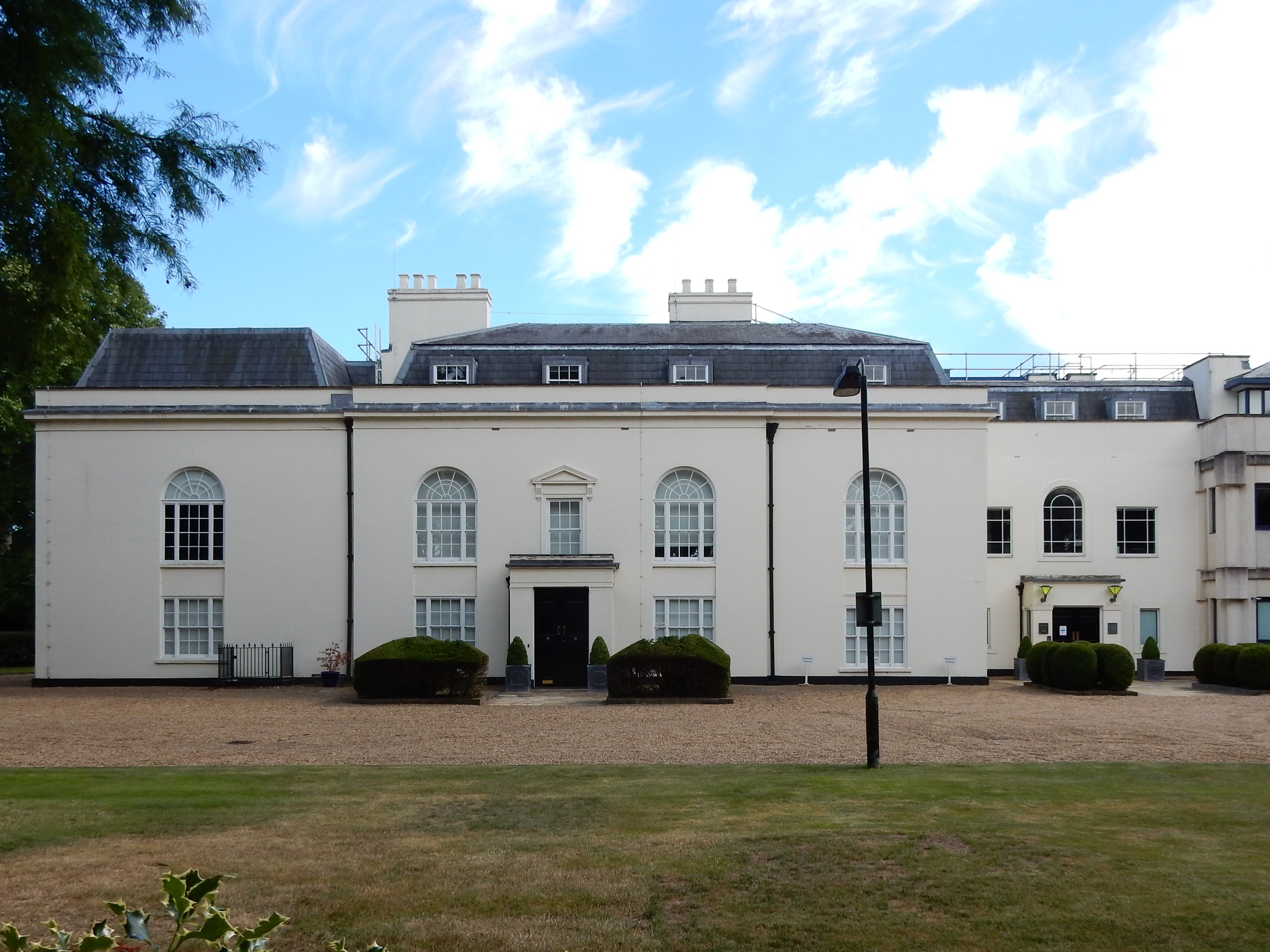
Drayton Hall, offices of Ferring Pharmaceuticals, Kore Wireless and North South Wines

Historically, employment was commonly connected to agriculture, the railway yards and the canal. The former RAF West Drayton hosted a military air traffic control centre co-located with the civil London Terminal Control Centre, residual functions of which were relocated to Swanwick, Hampshire entirely by January 2008.

West Drayton has a mixture of tradespeople, airport workers, construction workers and commuters in office professions or public utilities such as schools and hospitals. Its housing hosts people with a range of incomes, with relatively large areas built aesthetically in keeping with existing housing by the local authority.

West Drayton has rapid connectivity to the M4 and thereafter to the M25 and motorways north-west and south-west. The M4 spur and the A408 Stockley Road by-pass links to Heathrow Airport and to the Stockley Business Park, respectively. The Stockley Close Industrial estate lies on the eastern side of the by-pass. The businesses situated here are: Ocado, Greencore, Carrier Retail Systems, Amalga Ltd, Clevertronics, MNX Global Logistics and the Heathrow Parcel Centre.

Drayton Hall has the offices of Ferring Pharmaceuticals, Trizell Ltd, Kore Wireless and North South Wines. Britannia Court, on the east side of The Green, has the offices of the Schools HR Co-operative, MagLabs, Wells Burcombe LLP, MD Developments Ltd, Insultec Ltd, QIK Group and Flight Data Systems.

== Culture and recreation ==
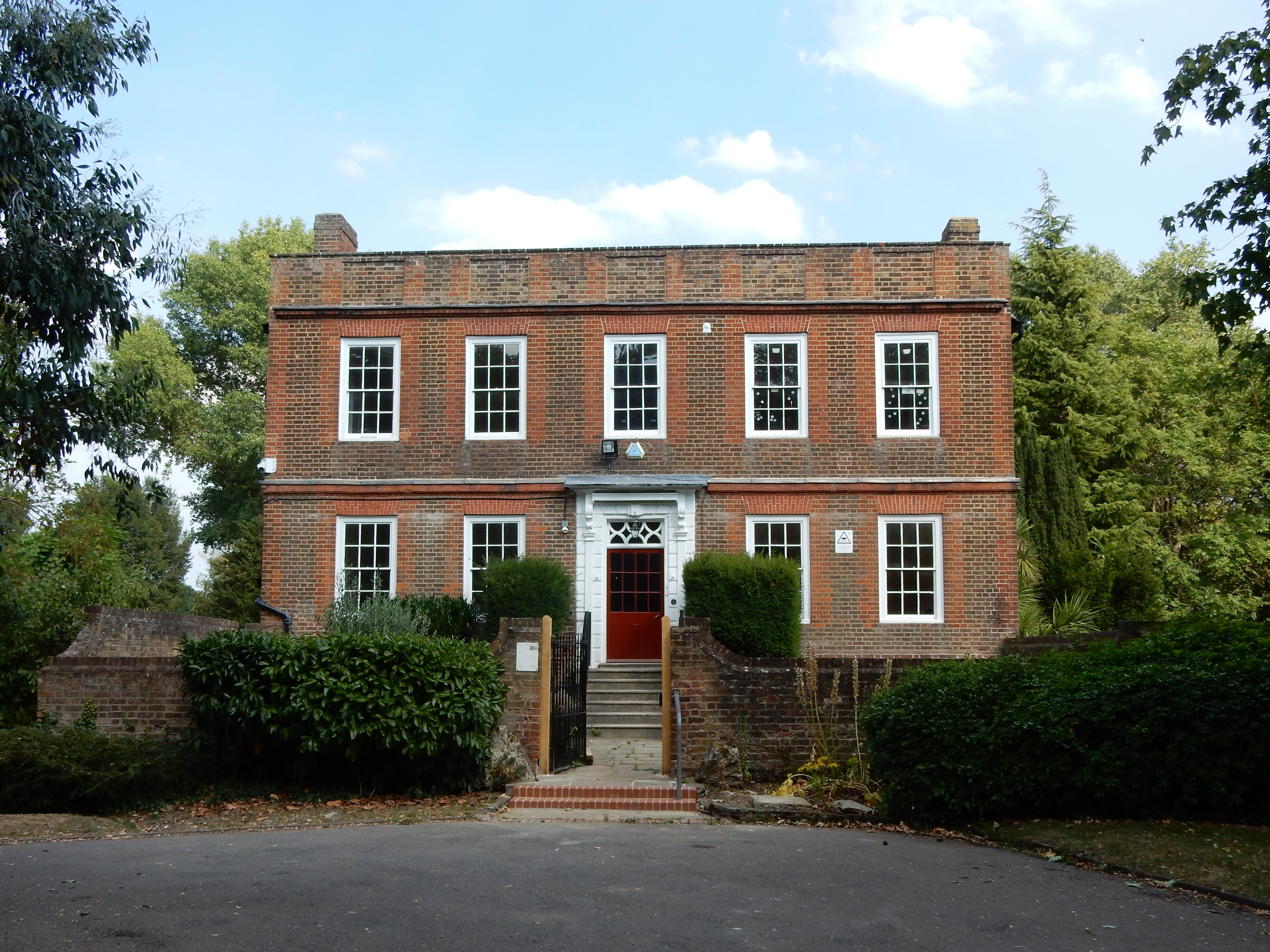
Southlands Arts Centre

- The Yiewsley and West Drayton Arts Council maintain the Southlands Arts Centre. They oversee events and promote local creativity. There are many exhibitions, music festivals, and creative endeavours from fine arts, photography, film-making and music groups.
- Community events and activities are held at the Yiewsley and West Drayton Community centre on Harmondsworth Road.
- West Drayton Library is situated on Station Road.
- The Yiewsley and West Drayton Band is a second section brass band established in 1890 and maintains a year-round programme of concerts and community events.
- 1381 Squadron (West Drayton & Yiewsley) Royal Air Force Air Cadets are based at Summer Drive.
- The 2nd West Drayton Scout Group are based at Rowan Road.
- There are two local amateur football clubs, West Drayton FC and Townmead Youth FC.
- The Closes public park has a playground, outdoor gym, Tennis courts and a multi use ball court.

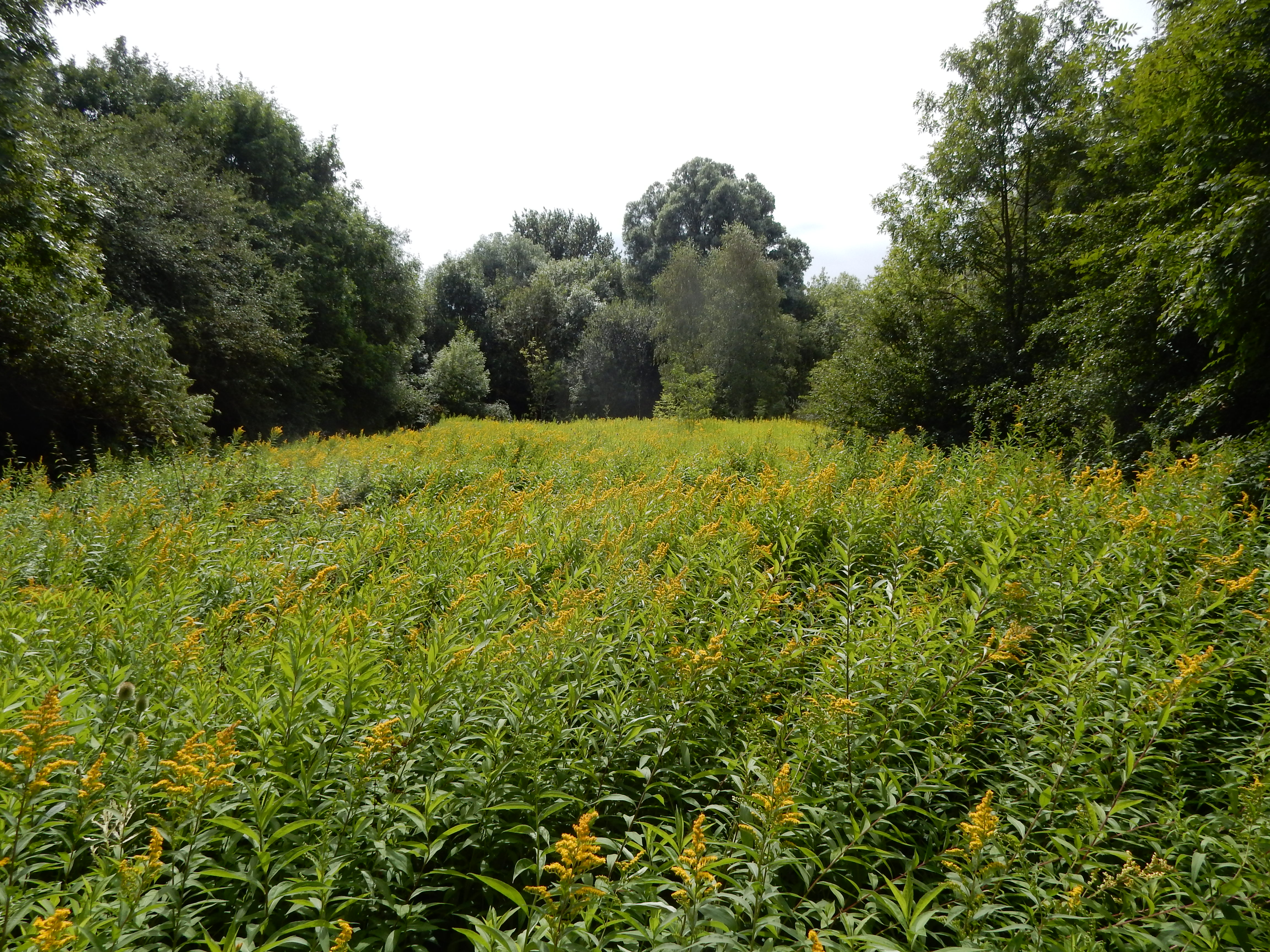
Mabey's Meadow in the Frays Island and Mabey's Meadow Nature Reserve

- The Colne Valley regional park lies on the western side of West Drayton. Here Frays Island and Mabey's Meadow are Sites of Metropolitan Importance for Nature Conservation and are managed by the London Wildlife Trust.

== Notable people ==
- Sir William Paget, 1st Baron Paget KG PC (1506–1563), statesman, holder of high office in the courts of Henry VIII, Edward VI, Mary I and Elizabeth I. Lived in West Drayton from 1537 until his death in 1563 and is buried in St Martin's Churchyard.
- Thomas Paget, 3rd Baron Paget (1544–1590), attainted of treason, was Lord of West Drayton Manor 1568–1587.
- Sir Christopher Hatton, Lord Chancellor KG PC (1540–1591), was Lord of West Drayton Manor 1587–1591.
- Sir George Carey, 2nd Baron Hunsdon Lord Chamberlain KG PC (1547–1603), lived at West Drayton between 1592 and his death in 1603.
- Sir William Paget, 4th Baron Paget (1572–1629), 'Adventurer' (shareholder) and member of the Council of the Virginia Company (London Company) and the Somers Isles Company is buried in St Martin's Churchyard.
- Sir William Paget, 5th Baron Paget KB (1609–1678), Royalist during the English Civil War, is buried in St Martin's Churchyard.
- Henry Paget, 1st Earl of Uxbridge PC (1663–1743) died at West Drayton Manor.
- Sir Henry Paget, 2nd Earl of Uxbridge (1719–1769), is buried in St Martin's Churchyard.
- Publisher Sir Allen Lane founder of Penguin Books, lived at The Mill House.
- Sir Charles Aubrey Smith Captain of the England Cricket team and Hollywood actor, lived at Avenue House between 1903 and 1908 and the Old Orchard in Mill Road from 1908 to 1930.
- William Nigel Bruce Hollywood actor, lived at 1 De Burgh Crescent between 1905 and 1934.
- Henry Havelock Ellis physician and writer, lived at Woodpecker Farm, Mill Road between 1911 and 1913.
- Cosmo Hamilton Playwright and Novelist, lived at Southlands.
- J.W. (Jack) Hearne, Cricketer, who represented England in twenty-four Test matches, lived in Bagley Close.
- Actor Julian Rhind-Tutt was born in West Drayton.
