= William Paget, 4th Baron Paget =

English peer (1572–1629)

William Paget, 4th Baron Paget of Beaudesert (1572 – 29 August 1629) was an English peer and colonist born in Beaudesert House, Staffordshire, England to Thomas Paget, 3rd Baron Paget and Nazareth Newton. His grandfather was William Paget, 1st Baron Paget (1506-1563).

William's father and his uncle, Charles Paget were both devout Catholics, and would not conform to the Protestant religion of Queen Elizabeth I. Thomas Paget fled to Paris on the uncovering of the Throckmorton Plot in November 1583, joining his brother who had been in exile there since 1581. The failed conspiracy's plan was for an invasion of England by French forces under the command of Henri I, Duke of Guise, financed by Philip II of Spain. English Catholics would then rise up and depose Elizabeth, placing Catholic Mary, Queen of Scots on the English throne. Europe was ablaze with conflicts between Catholics and Protestants. England's old enemy, France, was in the midst of its Religious Wars, which saw the St. Bartholomew's Day massacre in the year in which William was born. In 1587 Thomas Paget was attainted of treason by act of parliament while in exile, resulting in him being stripped of his title and lands. He died in Brussels in 1590.

== Life ==
William, a Protestant, applied himself vigorously to England's interests, taking part in the 1596 capture of Cádiz. He never earned the favour of Queen Elizabeth I, but the family title and lands were restored upon him by her Scottish heir King James I in 1604. In 1612 he became an adventurer of the Virginia Company. The Company had been created under Royal Charter to colonise North America as a merchant venture. It founded its first settlement, Jamestown, in 1607. That colony fared badly in its first years, and a fleet sent to relieve it in 1609 was broken up by a hurricane, with the Company's flagship, the Sea Venture, lost on the reefs of Bermuda. This began England's claim to, and the permanent settlement of, Bermuda, and the Virginia Company's Third Charter extended the limits of Virginia far enough out to sea to encompass Bermuda, which was also known as Virgineola. The first intended settlers arrived in 1612, to join the remaining survivors of the Sea Venture. Ever since, the colony (now called an Overseas Territory) has had two official names, Bermuda, and The Somers Isles. In 1615, a second company was created by the shareholders of the Virginia Company. Called the Somers Isles Company, this administered Bermuda until 1684. Eight of Bermuda's nine parishes (originally called tribes) were commercial land, and named for major shareholders of the Company. Paget Parish, in the centre of Bermuda, was named for William Paget in 1617. The coat of arms of the parish is identical to that of Baron Paget de Beaudesert. William Paget died in 1629, and was buried in West Drayton, in Middlesex.

== Family ==
William married before 19 June 1602 Lettice Knollys (1583–1655), daughter of Sir Henry Knollys (c. 1542 – 21 December 1582), Member of Parliament representing first Shoreham, Kent (1563) and then Oxfordshire, Esquire of the Body to Elizabeth I (son of Sir Francis Knollys and Catherine Carey), and Margaret Cave (1549–1600), daughter of Sir Ambrose Cave and Margaret Willington. William and Lettice had the following children:

1. Dorothy Paget (born c. 1602)
2. Margaret Paget (born c. 1604 – buried 10 September 1652) married Sir William Hicks, 1st Baronet, of Beverston
3. Anne Paget (born c. 1605) married (1) Sir Simon Harcourt (2) William Waller
4. Henry Paget (born c. 1607)
5. William Paget, 5th Baron Paget (13 September 1609 – 19 October 1678) married Lady Frances Rich, daughter of Henry Rich, 1st Earl of Holland and Isabel Cope
6. Thomas Paget (born c. 1611)
7. Catherine Paget (born c. 1615 – 1695) married Anthony Irby

== Notes ==
Peerage of England
Preceded by Thomas Paget	Baron Paget; 1604–1629	Succeeded by William Paget
