= William Paget, 5th Baron Paget =

English peer (1609–1678)

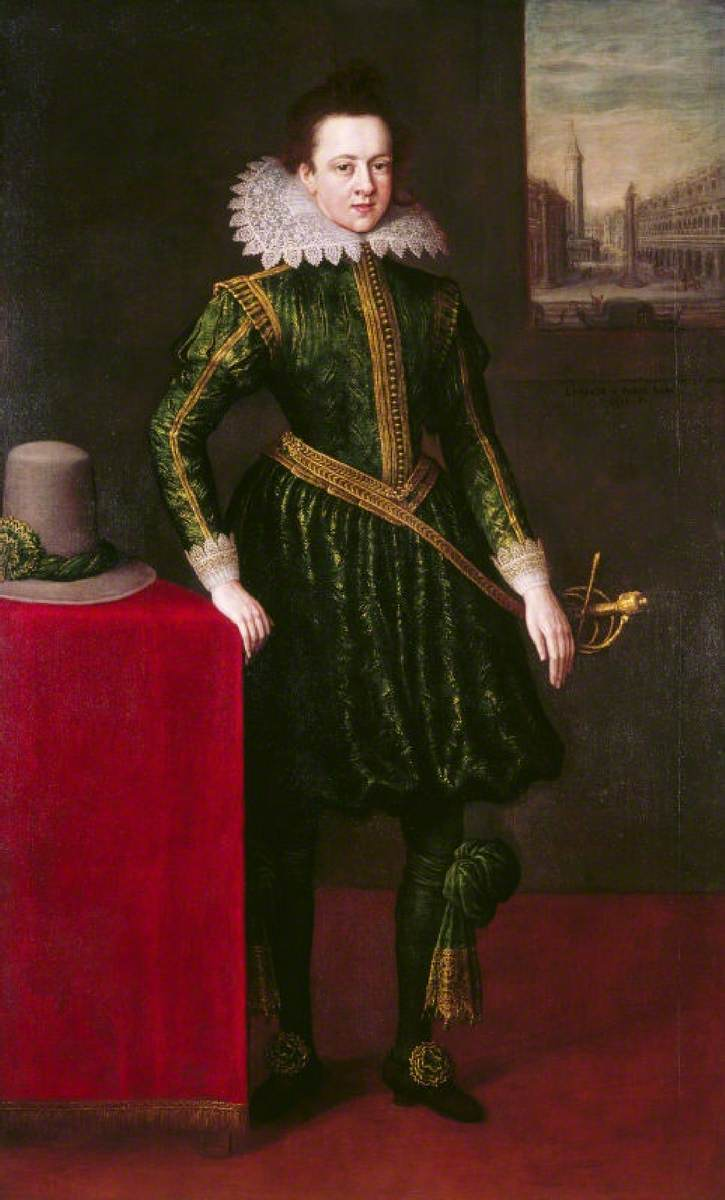
A Young Nobleman, said to be William Paget, 5th Baron Paget, attributed to Leandro Bassano, National Trust

William Paget, 5th Baron Paget (13 September 1609 – 19 October 1678) was an English peer.

== Early life ==
He was born at Beaudesert House, Staffordshire, England on 13 September 1609. He was the son of William Paget, 4th Baron Paget and his wife, Lettice Knollys. Among his siblings were Hon. Margaret Paget (wife of Sir William Hicks, 1st Baronet), Hon. Anne Paget (wife of Sir Simon Harcourt and William Waller), and Hon. Catherine Paget (wife of Sir Anthony Irby).

His paternal grandparents were Thomas Paget, 3rd Baron Paget, and Nazareth Newton (a daughter of Sir John Newton). His maternal grandparents were Sir Henry Knollys (a son of Sir Francis Knollys) and Margaret Cave (a daughter of Sir Ambrose Cave).

== Career ==
He was a Parliamentarian with land in Buckinghamshire. At the outbreak of the English Civil War in 1641, he was made the Parliamentarian Lord Lieutenant of Buckinghamshire. However the following year he swapped sides to become a Royalist under King Charles I and so was dismissed from that role and replaced by Philip Wharton, 4th Baron Wharton.

In c. 1620, his portrait was painted by Leandro Bassano. In the full-length portrait, he is "wearing a grey doublet trimmed with gold brocade and with lace cuffs and ruff, his shoes with gold trim and a silk scarf tied above his left knee. His right hand resting on a covered table next to his hat. In the distance beyond the room, through a window is a view of Venice behind."

== Personal life ==
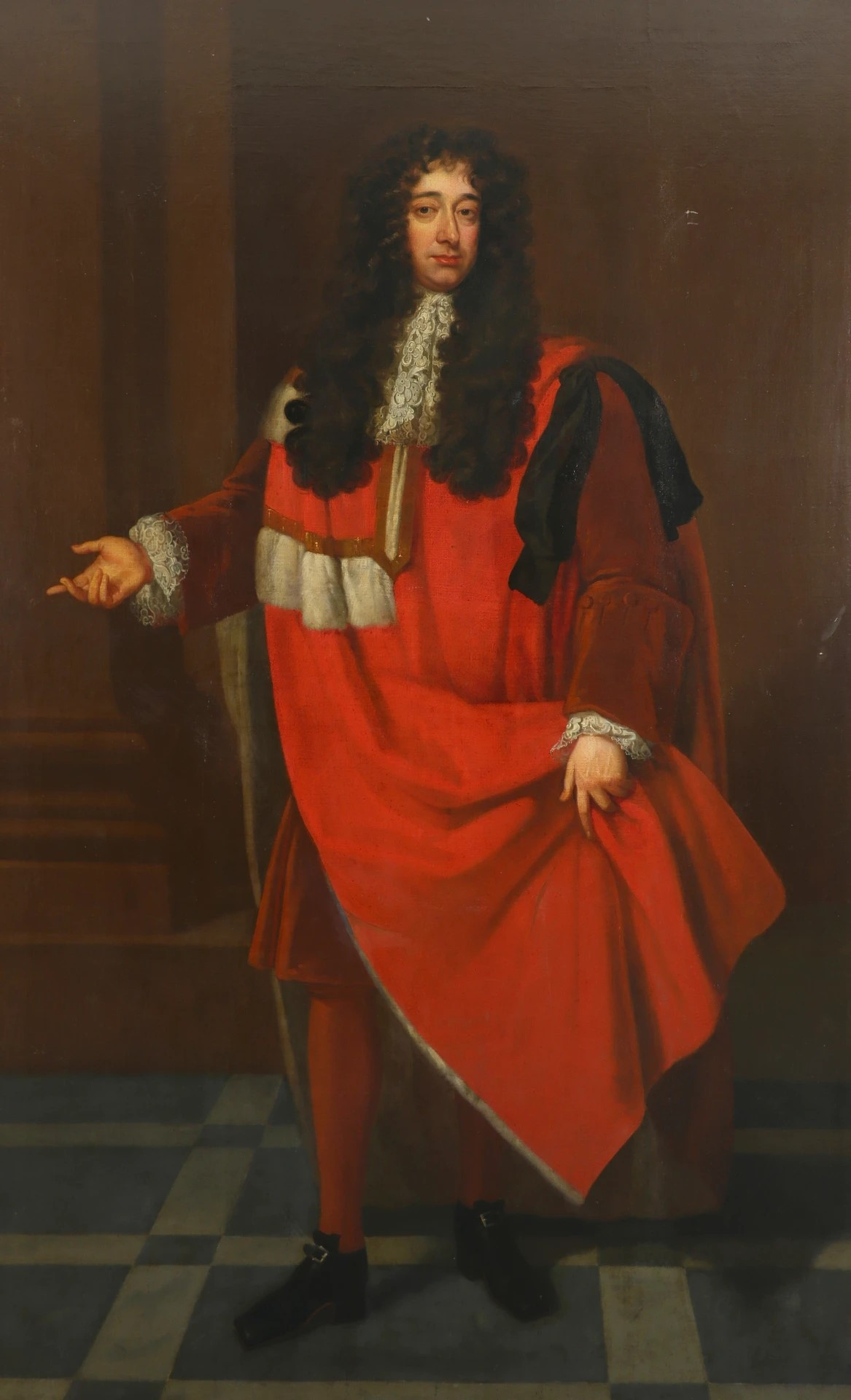
Portrait of his eldest son, William Paget, 6th Baron Paget, in peer's robes

On 28 June 1632 Paget married Lady Frances Rich, daughter of Henry Rich, 1st Earl of Holland and his wife, Isabel Cope (a daughter of Sir Walter Cope). From 1637 to 1643 they lived at 43 King Street, Covent Garden. Together, they were the parents of ten children:

- William Paget, 6th Baron Paget (1637–1713), who married Frances Pierrepont, a daughter of Hon. Francis Pierrepont (son of the 1st Earl of Kingston-upon-Hull). After her death, he married his cousin, Isabella Irby, a daughter of Sir Anthony Irby and Hon. Catherine Paget.
- Hon. Henry Paget (b. c. 1643), who married Mary O'Rorke, daughter of Col. Hugh O'Rorke, High Sheriff of Leitrim, in 1684. After her death, he married Anne Sandford.
- Hon. Thomas Paget (b. c. 1645)
- Hon. Isabella Paget (b. c. 1647)
- Hon. Lettice Paget (b. c. 1649), who married Richard Hampden.
- Hon. Elizabeth Paget (b. c. 1651)
- Hon. Frances Paget (b. c. 1653), who married Rowland Hunt.
- Hon. Penelope Paget (b. c. 1655), who married Philip Foley.
- Hon. Diana Paget (b. c. 1657–1707), who married Henry Ashhurst.
- Hon. Anne Paget (b. c. 1659)

Lord Paget died on 19 October 1678, and was succeeded in the barony by his eldest son, William.

=== Descendants ===
Through his son Henry, he was a grandfather of Dorothy Paget (d. c. 1734), who married Sir Edward Irby, 1st Baronet, and Brig.-Gen. Thomas Paget (d. 1741), the Governor of Menorca who married Mary Whitcombe (they were the parents of Caroline Paget (d. 1766), who married Sir Nicholas Bayly, 2nd Baronet in 1737).

Through his daughter Penelope, he is a direct ancestor to Charles Darwin.

Honorary titles
| Preceded by The Earl of Pembroke | Lord Lieutenant of Buckinghamshire (Parliamentarian); 1641–1642 | Succeeded by The Lord Wharton |
Peerage of England
| Preceded by William Paget | Baron Paget; 1629–1678 | Succeeded by William Paget |
