= Southlands Arts Centre =

Art centre in London, United Kingdom

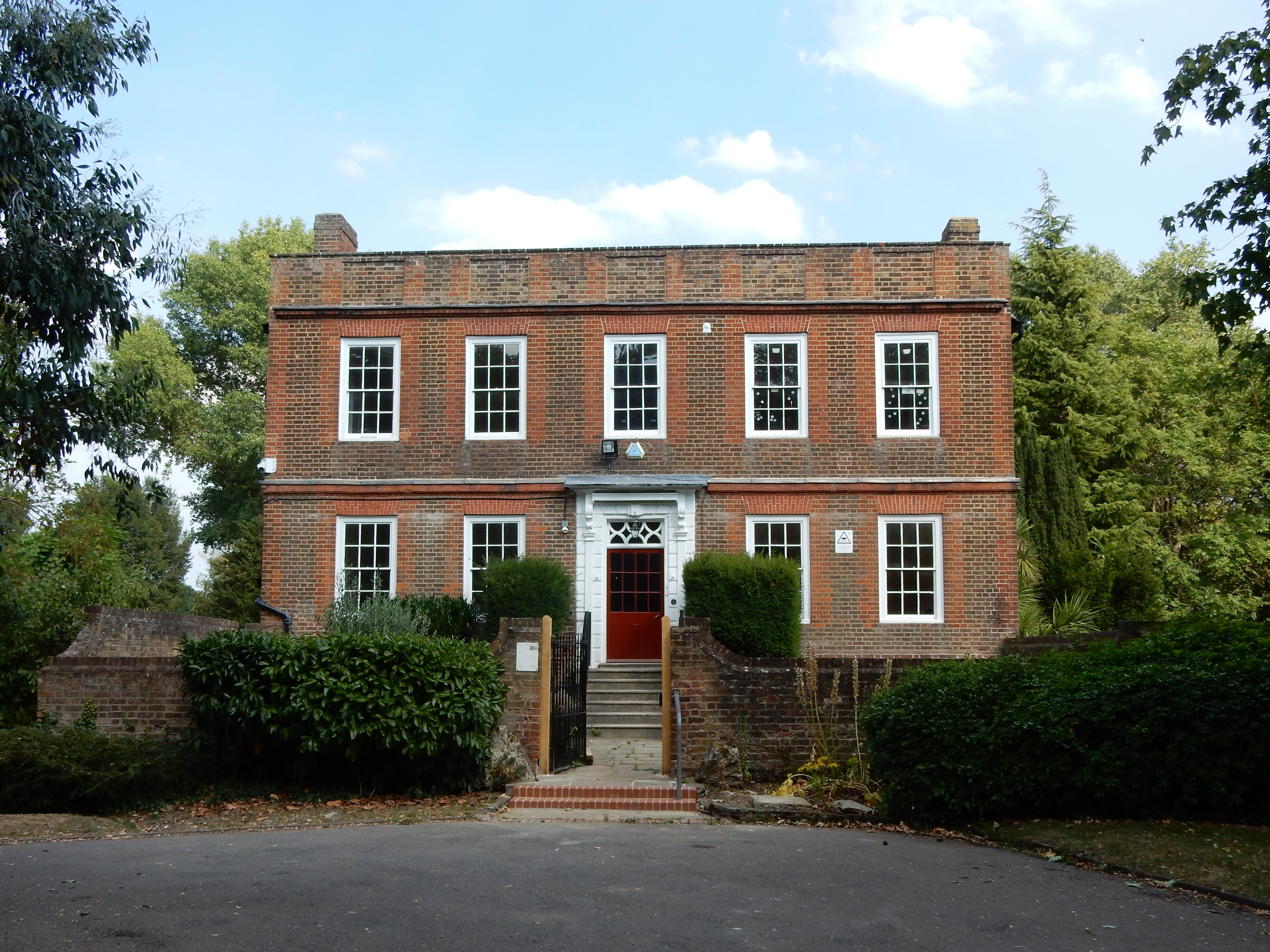
- Address: Southlands Arts Centre; 75 The Green; West Drayton; UB7 7PW
- Operator: Yiewsley and West Drayton Arts Council
- Type: Arts centre

Construction
- Opened: 1965

Website
- www.southlandsarts.co.uk

The Southlands Arts Centre is a Queen Anne-style Grade II* listed building in West Drayton, with extensive grounds open to the public.

== History ==
The Yiewsley and West Drayton Arts Council was established in 1964 after the London Government Act 1963 came into force. Its aim was to embed a strong cultural identity for the local area and the wider London Borough of Hillingdon. It acquired the tenure for what is now Southlands Arts Centre in 1965.

Yiewsley and West Drayton Urban District Council had acquired the property in 1963. Previous owners included playwright and novelist Cosmo Hamilton (1870–1942).

== Events ==
Yiewsley and West Drayton Arts Council oversee a varied range of public activities at the venue: There are arts groups and classes, professional photography and art exhibitions; film, music, and drama events; textile design; and annual Craft and Victorian fayres.

== Transport ==
=== Train ===
The closest train station is West Drayton. The station is a ten-minute walk away.

=== Buses ===
U3 bus (to the Green); 222, 350 and U5 buses to the High Street.

=== Car ===
In easy reach of the M4, M25 and M40.
