= Charles Paget (conspirator) =

Roman Catholic conspirator

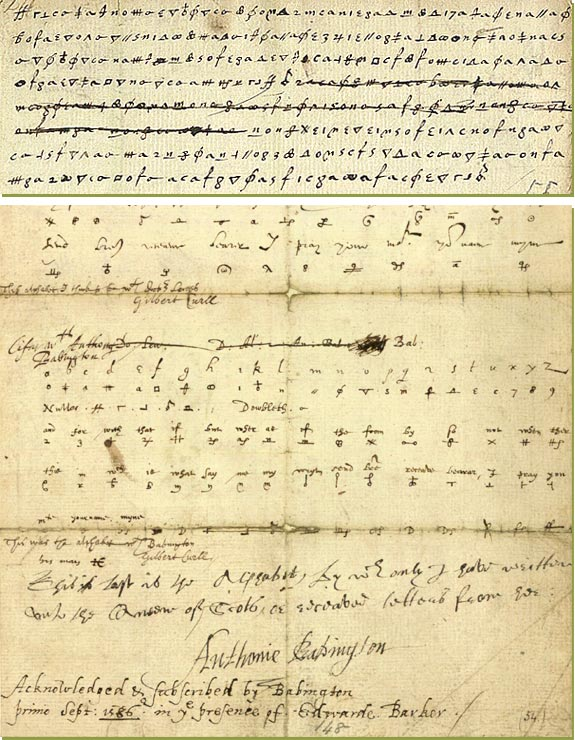
- Postscript to Mary, Queen of Scots' letter to Babington forged by Walsingham's 'decypherer'. In his letter of 31 January Paget claimed to interpret this cipher.
- Born: c.1546
- Died: 1612
- Noble family: Paget
- Father: William Paget, 1st Baron Paget
- Mother: Anne Preston

Charles Paget (c. 1546–1612) was a Roman Catholic conspirator, involved in the Babington Plot to assassinate Queen Elizabeth I of England.

== Family ==
Charles Paget, born about 1546, was a younger son of the statesman William Paget, 1st Baron Paget, and his wife, Anne Preston, the daughter and heir of Henry Preston. Paget had three brothers, Henry, Thomas, and Edward (died young), and six sisters who married well.

== Education ==
Paget left University of Cambridge on 27 May 1559 as a fellow commoner of Caius College. When Paget's father died in 1563, Paget inherited the lordship of Weston-on-Trent in Derbyshire. The following year he was present when Queen Elizabeth visited Trinity Hall, Cambridge. Like many other students, he left the university without taking a degree, and although he was admitted to the Middle Temple in 1560, he never practised law.

== Exile ==
Like many other members of his family, Paget was a zealous Catholic, and in 1581 he went into exile, and for seven years lived principally in Paris, but also in Rouen. While in Paris he became closely associated with Thomas Morgan, an agent of Mary, Queen of Scots. Paget and Morgan endeavoured to keep Mary informed of events in France and other parts through correspondence with her two secretaries in England, Claude Nau and Gilbert Curle, and it was said that 'they four governed from thenceforth all the queen's affairs at their pleasure.'

Paget and Morgan also helped Mary's ambassador to the French court, James Beaton, Archbishop of Glasgow, administer Mary's income from her dower lands in France (said to have been thirty million crowns a year), from which all three were granted pensions. According to Holmes, although Morgan and Paget's enemies accused them of fraud, 'the degree of control which they were able to exercise over Mary's finances was probably quite slight', and it is known that in 1586 Mary herself concealed from Paget the fact that she had received funds from Philip II of Spain, because she owed Paget 4000 crowns.

Paget and Morgan were involved in several plots against the English government. In 1582 the Jesuit Robert Persons and William Allen conceived a plot which would have had Henry I, Duke of Guise, Philip II of Spain, and Pope Gregory XIII work in concert with Scottish and English Catholics to bring about a successful invasion of England with the objective of releasing Mary, Queen of Scots, and deposing Elizabeth. Persons later claimed that Paget and Morgan did not fully support the plan. Whether Paget and Morgan acted out of caution or for other motives is unclear. It is also said that an alliance between Paget and Morgan and Owen Lewis in Rome was the cause of disagreement among the Catholics. Persons states that the original cause of Paget and Morgan's disagreement with Allen and himself was their exclusion, at the request of Henry I, Duke of Guise and Beaton, from the meeting held at Paris in 1582, and that after their exclusion Paget and Morgan inspired Mary with distrust of Spain and the Jesuits.

Paget appears to have been a double agent, plotting against Queen Elizabeth while passing on information to her ministers. On 8 January 1582 he wrote from Paris to Sir Francis Walsingham that:

God made me known to you in this town, and led me to offer you affection; nothing can so comfort me as her Majesty's and your favour.

And again on 28 September 1582:

In my answer to her Majesty's command for my return to England, assist me that she may yield me her favour and liberty of conscience in religion. . . . If this cannot be done, then solicit her for my enjoying my small living on this side the sea, whereby I may be kept from necessity, which otherwise will force me to seek relief of some foreign prince.

On 23 October 1582 Paget informed Walsingham of his intention to go to Rouen for his health and to drink English beer. He professed dutiful allegiance to Elizabeth, and his readiness to be employed in any service, a matter of conscience in religion only excepted.

== Secret visit to England ==
In the summer of 1583, Paget travelled from Rouen secretly into England, using the pseudonym Mope. It is alleged that the object of his journey was to concert measures for an invasion by the Duke of Guise and the King of Scots. For a time he hid in the house of William Davies, at Patching, Sussex. On 8 September he had an interview at Petworth with Henry Percy, 8th Earl of Northumberland. He was afterwards secretly conveyed to a lodge in the Earl's park called Conigar Lodge, where he stayed for about eight days. His brother, Thomas, was also summoned to Petworth. On 16 September Paget met in a wood, called Patching Copse, with William Shelley, who was subsequently convicted of treason. Paget likely also met at this time with Lord Henry Howard, who had come to Sussex from Norfolk.

In a letter written on 25 October 1582 Thomas Paget told Paget that his abiding in Rouen was more misliked in England than his abiding in Paris, considering that he consorted there with men like John Lesley, Bishop of Ross, adding that:

he was sorry to hear by some good friends that he carried himself not so dutifully as he ought to do, and that he would disown him as a brother if he forgot the duty he owed to England.

From this letter, it would seem that Thomas Paget's interview with his brother at Petworth must have been of a more innocent character than has been generally supposed. However, about the end of November Thomas Paget himself fled to Paris and was from thenceforth suspected of complicity in all his brother's treasons.

== Supporters of Mary, Queen of Scots, in Paris ==
On 2 December 1583, Sir Edward Stafford, the English ambassador to the French court, wrote from Paris to Sir Frances Walsingham that: "Lord Paget, with Charles Paget and Charles Arundel, suddenly entered my dining chamber before any one was aware of it, and Lord Paget says they came away for their consciences, and for fear, having enemies". They also told him that "for all things but their consciences they would live as dutifully as any in the world".

After this, Charles Paget, in conjunction with Morgan and other malcontents at home and abroad, continued their plans, which were well known to the English government, and in June 1584 Sir Edward Stafford, the English ambassador to the French court, made a formal demand, in the name of Queen Elizabeth, for the surrender of Thomas Paget, Charles Paget, Charles Arundel, Thomas Throckmorton, and Thomas Morgan for having conspired against the life of the English Queen. The King of France, however, refused to deliver them up, although he did imprison Morgan in the Bastille, and sent his papers to Queen Elizabeth.

Paget went to Rouen in August 1585 and was said to be writing a book about the Throckmorton Plot. He was regarded with the utmost distrust and suspicion by Walsingham, who, in a despatch sent to Stafford on 16 December 1584, wrote that: "Charles Paget is a most dangerous instrument, and I wish, for Northumberland's sake, he had never been born".

Thomas Morgan introduced Paget to Albert Fontenay, a brother of Mary, Queen of Scots' French secretary Claude Nau. They met Claud Hamilton in Paris in January 1586, before his return to Scotland. They hoped Hamilton would be an advocate for Mary in Scotland with her son James VI. Paget wrote to Mary and Nau, mentioning Fontenay's "great comfort and friendship" and his "many friendly offices". Mary wrote to Paget in May 1586, after receiving five letters from him, with an "infinite number" of other letters written in cipher code. Mary hoped that Spain would invade England, and Scotland would assist or remain neutral. Her son, James VI, would be a hostage and brought up as a Catholic. She wanted Paget to discuss the scheme with her ally Claud Hamilton, who was in Scotland and could build support amongst the Scottish nobility.

Mary's secretaries Claude Nau and Gilbert Curle were arrested in August 1586. Her correspondence was examined. Curle was made to certify on a copy of one of Mary's letters to Paget that she had first given him a draft in French, which he translated into English. William Cecil added a further note, that this was Curle's "superscription".

Although all his plots had signally failed, Paget appears to have clung to the hope that the Protestant religion in England could be subverted by a foreign force. Writing under the signature of 'Nauris,' from Paris to one Nicholas Berden alias Thomas Rogers (a courier and a spy for Walsingham), on 31 January 1588 he observed, in reference to the anticipated triumph of the Spanish Armada: "When the day of invasion happens, the proudest Councillor or Minister in England will be glad of the favour of a Catholic gentleman". In the same letter, he stated that all Walsingham's alphabets or ciphers had been interpreted by him. Berden sent copies of Paget's cipher alphabets to Walsingham's cryptographer Thomas Phelippes to gather evidence against conspirators.

== Brussels ==
In March 1588 Paget entered the service of the Philip II of Spain, and went to live in Brussels, where he remained for the next eleven years. His name appears in the list of English exiles in Flanders who refused to sign the address of the English fathers of the Society of Jesus.

He continued his correspondence:

I am incited to boldness with you by your favour to my nephew Paget, and the good report I hear of your sweet nature, modesty, and wisdom. I desire ardently to do a service agreeable both to the queen and the king of Spain. I am under obligation to the one as an English subject, and to the other as a catholic prince who has relieved me in my banishment.

He added that

His Highness was willing to treat with allies, and particularly with the queen, that the crowns of England and Spain might return to their old amity.

On 27 April 1598 Paget wrote from Liège to Thomas Barnes in London: "I am unspeakably comforted that the queen inclines to listen to my humble suit. The profits of my land are worth £200 a year to myself; it is a lordship called Weston-upon-Trent. ... I cannot capitulate with the Queen; but the greater my offence has been, the greater is her mercy in pardoning and restoring me to my blood and living, showing the liberality which makes her famous, and obliging me to spend my life at her feet".

== Paris and the Scottish faction ==
In 1598, Paget arranged for a conspirator Thomas Barnes to visit Antwerp, pretending his journey was to buy tapestry and pictures for the Earl of Essex. The English Catholic exiles eventually split into two parties, one, called the Spanish faction, supporting the claims of Isabella Clara Eugenia, Infanta of Spain, to the English crown, while the other, the Scottish faction, advocated the right of James VI of Scotland. Paget was the acknowledged head of the Scottish faction, and in 1599 he threw up his employment under the King of Spain, and returned to Paris. A letter from a Catholic in Brussels to his friend, a monk at Liège, giving a detailed account of Paget and his practices. The writer says that "from the first hour that his years permitted him to converse with men, he has been tampering in broils and practices, betwixt friend and friend, man and wife, and, as his credit and craft increase, betwixt prince and prince".

Animated by intense hatred of the Spanish faction, Paget lost no time after his arrival at Paris in putting himself in communication with Sir Henry Neville, the English ambassador, who forwarded a detailed account of the circumstances to Sir Robert Cecil in a despatch dated 27 June (O.S.) 1599. Cecil seems to have been by no means anxious to encourage Paget, but Neville was more favourable to him. Paget said he felt himself slighted by the English government, but he nevertheless seems to have given from time to time important intelligence to Neville and to Ralph Winwood the succeeding ambassador at the French court. His attainder appears to have been reversed in the first parliament of James I, probably by the act restoring in blood his nephew William, Lord Paget, and it is presumed that he returned to England. His paternal estate, including the manor of Weston on Trent and other manors in Derbyshire, was restored to him on 13 July 1603; and on 18 August in the same year James I granted him £200 per annum, part of a fee-farm rent reserved by a patent of Queen Elizabeth, bestowing the lands of Lord Paget on William Paget and his heirs. He died, probably in England, about the beginning of February 1611 – 1612, leaving a good estate to the sons of one of his sisters.

== Major works ==
1. A proposition for calling the Jesuits out of England, by means of the French king, during the treaty, and entitled A Brief Note of the Practices that divers Jesuits have had for killing Princes and changing of States, June 1598. Manuscript in the State Papers, Dom. Eliz. vol. cclxvii. art. 67.
2. Answer to Dolman [Robert Parsons] on the Succession to the English Crown, Paris, 1600. John Petit, writing from Liège to Peter Halins, 25 July (O.S.) 1600, remarks : ' A book has come out in answer to that one on the succession to the crown of England, which is all for the Scot, but I cannot get sight of it. Clitheroe was the author, and he being dead, Charles Paget has paid for its printing' (Cal. State Papers, Dom. Eliz. 1598–1601, pp. 456, 460). It appears that the latter part of the book was written by Paget.
3. An Answere made by me, Charles Paget, Esquier, to certayne untruthes and falsityes, tochinge myselfe, contayned in a booke [by Robert Parsons] intitled a briefe Apologie or defence of the Catholicke Hierarchie & subordination in Englande, Printed with Dr. Humphrey Ely's ' Certaine Briefe Notes vpon a Briefe Apologie set out under the name of the Priestes united to the Archpriest,' Paris 1603
