= Anne Waller, Lady Waller =

Anne Waller
- Born: Lady Anne Paget
- Died: October 1661
- Writing career
- Subject: Diarist

Anne, Lady Waller (née Paget, formerly Lady Harcourt) was an English diarist and patron of clergy.

== Life ==
Anne was born into the powerful Paget family. Her parents were Lettice and William Paget, 4th Baron Paget. She had three brothers and the middle one of these would in time be William Paget, 5th Baron Paget. Her diaries record that she thought her upbringing religious and strict. The judge Sir Gilbert Gerard acted as her de facto godparent.

She married Simon Harcourt whilst he was a soldier serving on the continent. He was wounded several times. Their first son Philip was born in 1638. He was knighted before his death in 1642 while serving as Governor of Dublin. She was able to obtain £500 a year from her husband's estate at Stanton Harcourt which helped with the debts she was left with.

She married Sir William Waller as his third wife. In consideration of Harcourt's services in Ireland his widow received a parliamentary grant on 3 August 1648 of the lands of Corbally, County Dublin. The amount of this benefit is unclear.

In 1652, she started her diary which is extant and ensures her notability. The diary includes some historical detail before 1652.

According to different sources she died in October of 1661. Some said that she caused conflict between her second husband's children and her own from her first marriage. Nevertheless her son Philip Harcourt married her step daughter Ann Waller.
