= Simon Harcourt (soldier) =

Sir Simon Harcourt
- Born: 1601
- Died: 1642 (aged 40–41)
- Occupation: soldier
- Known for: Governor of Dublin

Sir Simon Harcourt (1601–1642) was an English soldier of fortune, and wartime governor of the city of Dublin.

== Life ==
Harcourt was the eldest son of Robert Harcourt and Frances, daughter of Geoffrey Vere, third son of John de Vere, 15th Earl of Oxford. Succeeding to a somewhat embarrassed estate, he sought a military career abroad. At the age of sixteen he served under his uncle, Sir Horace Vere, against the Spanish forces in the Low Countries, and was knighted at Whitehall Palace on 26 June 1627. The greater part of his life was spent in Holland in the service of the Prince of Orange. He was also in favour with Elizabeth of Bohemia, who commended him to Archbishop Laud, when business of a domestic nature (connected probably with the recovery of Stanton Harcourt) obliged him to repair to England in 1636. Though holding a commission as sergeant-major from the Prince of Orange, he took an active part in the Bishops' Wars against Scotland in 1639–40, as commander of a regiment of foot. A diary kept by him during this campaign still exists.

On the outbreak of the Irish rebellion of 1641, he was appointed, with the rank of colonel and with a commission as governor of the city of Dublin, to conduct a detachment of foot into that kingdom for the relief of the Protestants there. He arrived in Dublin on 31 December, but finding that in the meanwhile Sir Charles Coote had been appointed governor by the lords justices, some time elapsed before he was invested with the government of the city. During the winter he was mortally wounded during an attack on Carrickmines Castle, County Dublin; he was moved to Merrion, where he died the next day, 27 March 1642.

== Family ==
Harcourt married Anne, daughter of William Paget, 4th Baron Paget, in 1630, who afterwards married Sir William Waller as his third wife. In consideration of his services in Ireland his widow received a parliamentary grant on 3 August 1648 of the lands of Corbally in County Dublin, formerly in possession of Luke Netherville, an attainted rebel.
