= William Paget, 1st Baron Paget =

English statesman (1506–1563)

The Lord Paget
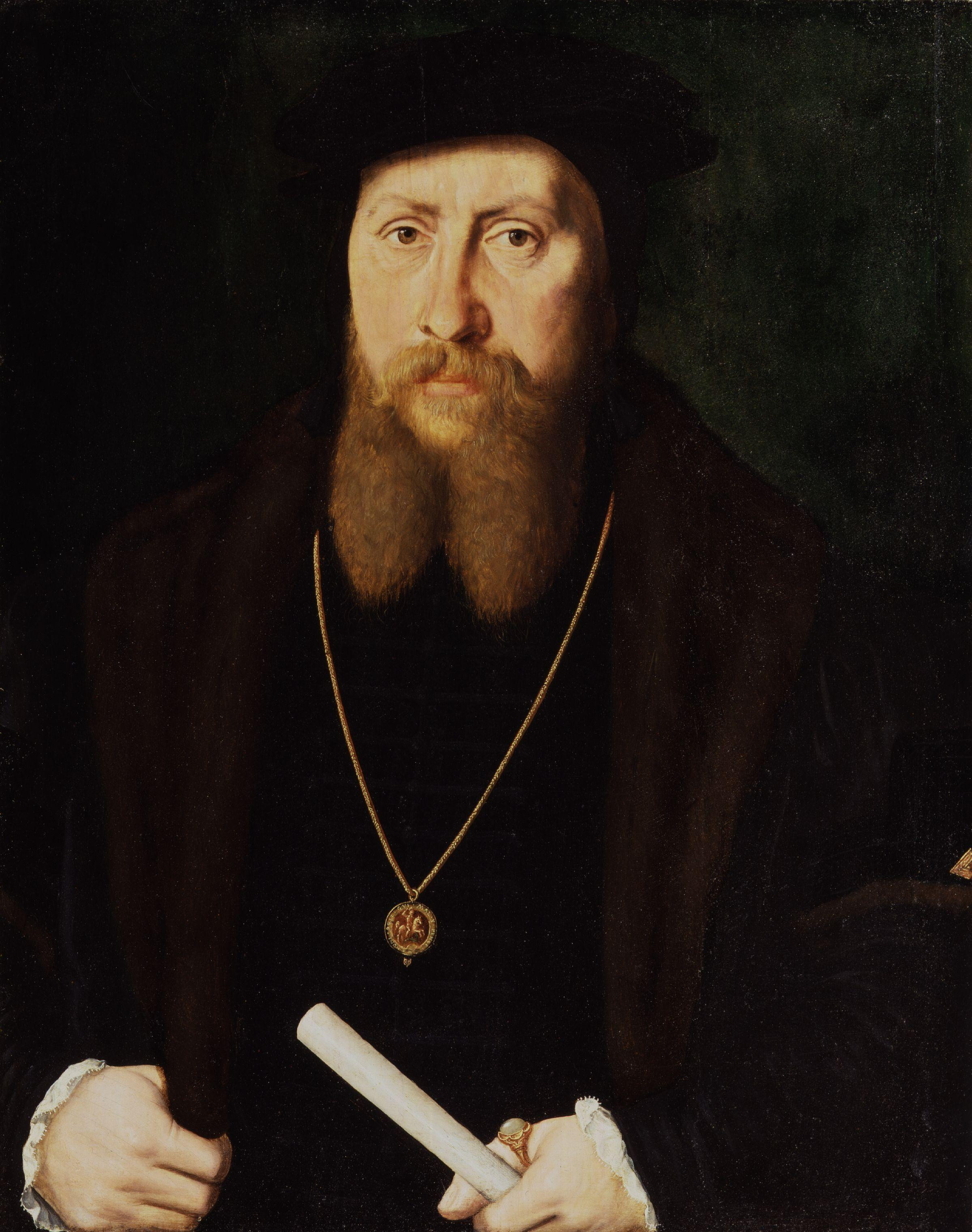
- Painting of William Paget, attributed to Master of the Stätthalterin Madonna
- Born: 1506; Wednesbury, Staffordshire, Kingdom of England
- Died: 9 June 1563 (aged 56–57); West Drayton
- Education: St Paul's School, Trinity Hall, Cambridge and University of Paris
- Occupation: several diplomatic missions
- Spouse: Anne Preston
- Children: Henry Paget, 2nd Baron Paget; Thomas Paget, 3rd Baron Paget; Charles Paget; Edward Paget; Etheldreda Paget; Eleanor Paget; Grisold Paget; Joan Paget; Dorothy Paget; Anne Paget
- Parent(s): John Paget; Anne Paget

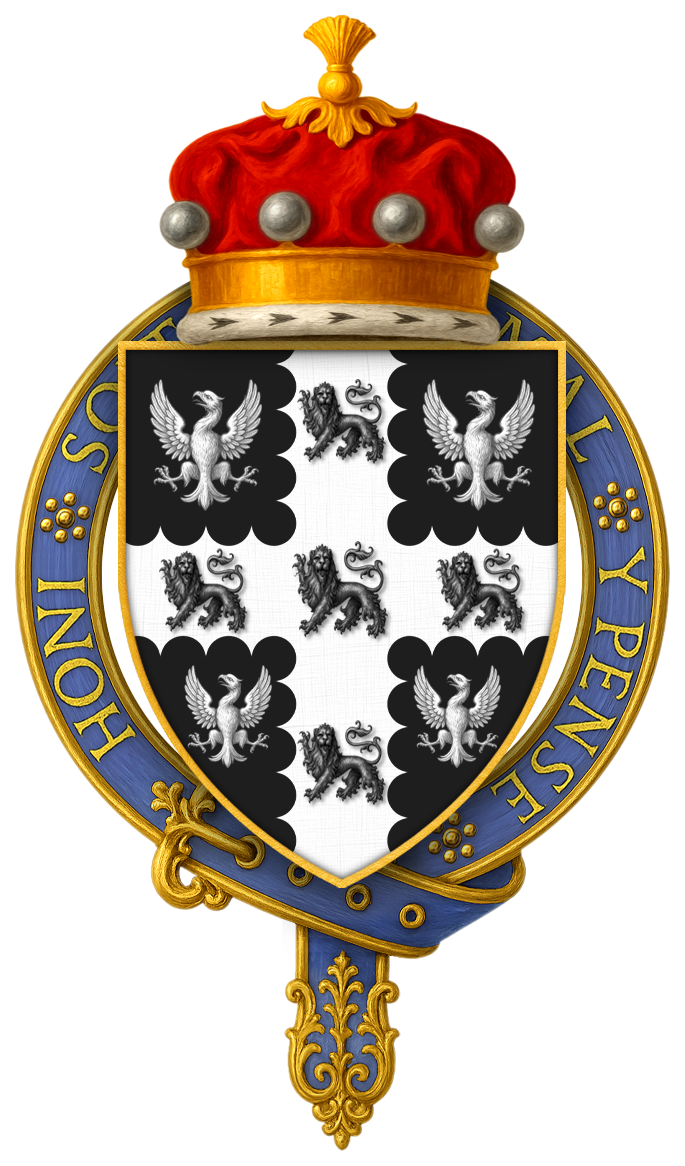
Arms of Sir William Paget, 1st Baron Paget, KG, granted 21 March 1552

William Paget, 1st Baron Paget of Beaudesert KG PC (1506 – 9 June 1563), was an English statesman and accountant who held prominent positions in the service of Henry VIII, Edward VI, and Mary I. He was the patriarch of the Paget family, whose descendants were created Earl of Uxbridge (1714) and Marquess of Anglesey (1815).

== Early life and education ==
William Paget was born around 1506 in humble circumstances, but little is confirmed about his origin. A family named Paget was recorded as nail makers in Wednesbury, Staffordshire, during the Tudor period. His father has been variously described as a sheep shearer, barber, clothworker, constable, or nail smithy.

According to Sir William Dugdale, he was the son of John Pachett or Paget, one of the serjeants-at-mace of the city of London. According to Staffordshire historian Frederick Hackwood, he was born in Wednesbury and taken to London by his father when he was very young.

Paget must have been extremely bright, as he was accepted as a pupil at St Paul's School when William Lily was its headmaster. At St Paul's, he befriended the future antiquary John Leland and later acted as one of his benefactors, and became close friends with Sir Thomas Wriothesley and Sir Anthony Denny. He then went up to Trinity Hall, Cambridge, where he studied civil law, proceeding afterwards to the University of Paris. At Cambridge, he was taken under the wing of Stephen Gardiner, Master at Trinity Hall, who became his patron.

== Political career ==
Paget served as Member of Parliament for Lichfield in 1529 and for Middlesex in 1545.

Probably through the influence of Stephen Gardiner, he was employed by King Henry VIII in several important diplomatic missions; in 1532 he was appointed Clerk of the Signet and soon afterwards of the privy council. He became secretary to Anne of Cleves in 1539 and was appointed Clerk of the Parliaments on 15 July 1541, although it seems likely that he never discharged the duties of this office in person, but rather through others. In April 1543 he was sworn of the privy council and appointed secretary of state, in which position Henry VIII relied on his advice, at last appointing him one of the council to act during the minority of King Edward VI.

Paget at first vigorously supported the protector Somerset, while counselling a moderation which Somerset did not always observe. Paget would go on to become increasingly alienated from the Duke, reaching out to him in a series of letters from February 1548 in which he tried to persuade Somerset to take others' opinions into consideration. He blamed Somerset's dictatorial style and foolish attempts to help the poor for the Prayer Book Rebellion in 1549. In 1547 he was made controller of the king's household, Chancellor of the Duchy of Lancaster, elected knight of the shire (MP) for Staffordshire and made a knight of the Garter; and in 1549 he was summoned by writ to the House of Lords as Baron Paget de Beaudesert (at which point he ceased to be the Clerk of the Parliaments). About the same time he obtained extensive grants of lands, including Cannock Chase and Burton Abbey in Staffordshire, in London the residence of the bishops of Exeter, afterwards known successively as Lincoln House and Essex House, on the site now occupied by the Outer Temple in the London, and also in 1547 he was granted the lordship and manor of Harmondsworth. He obtained Beaudesert in Staffordshire, which remained the chief seat of the Paget family.

Paget shared Somerset's disgrace, being committed to the Tower in 1551 and degraded from the Order of the Garter in the following year, besides suffering a heavy fine by the Star Chamber for having profited at the expense of the Crown in his administration of the duchy of Lancaster. He was, however, restored to the king's favour in 1553, and was one of the twenty-six peers who signed Edward's settlement of the crown on Lady Jane Grey in June of that year. He made his peace with Queen Mary I, who reinstated him as a knight of the Garter and in the privy council in 1553, and appointed him Lord Privy Seal in 1556. On the accession of Queen Elizabeth I in 1558, Paget retired from public life.

== Marriage and issue ==
In 1530, Paget married Anne, allegedly daughter of Henry Preston, grandson of Thomas Preston of Preston, Lancashire, and Nether Levens Hall, Westmorland. They four sons and six daughters.

- Henry, 2nd Baron Paget (c. 1539 – 28 December 1568), succeeded his father to the peerage
- Thomas, 3rd Baron Paget (c. 1540–1589), succeeded elder brother to the peerage
- Charles, well-known Catholic conspirator during the reign of Queen Elizabeth I; his brother Thomas was suspected of complicity in Charles's plots and was attainted in 1587
- Edward (died young)
- Etheldreda, married Sir Christopher Allen of Ightham Mote, Kent
- Eleanor, married firstly, Jerome Palmer, Esq., and secondly, Sir Rowland Clarke
- Grisold (or Grizelda), married firstly, Sir Thomas Rivett, and secondly, Sir William Waldegrave
- Joane (or Jane), married Sir Thomas Kitson
- Dorothy, married Sir Thomas Willoughby (died 1559)
- Anne (died 1590), married Sir Henry Lee

The 7th Baron Paget was created Baron Burton in 1712 and Earl of Uxbridge in 1714.

Honorary titles
| Preceded by William Whorwood | Custos Rotulorum of Staffordshire bef. 1547–1563 | Succeeded by The Earl of Essex |
Political offices
| Preceded by Sir Brian Tuke | Clerk of the Signet; 1532–? | Unknown |
| Preceded by Sir Thomas Wriothesley; Sir Ralph Sadler | Secretary of State; 1543–1548; With: Sir Thomas Wriothesley 1543–1544; Sir William Petre 1544–1548 | Succeeded by Sir Thomas Smith; Sir William Petre |
| Preceded by Sir John Gage | Comptroller of the Household; 1547–1550 | Succeeded by Sir John Gage |
| Preceded by Sir John Gage | Chancellor of the Duchy of Lancaster; 1547–1552 | Succeeded by Sir John Gates |
| Preceded by The Earl of Bedford | Lord Privy Seal; 1555–1558 | Succeeded by Sir Nicholas Bacon |
Government offices
| Preceded by none | Clerk of the Privy Council; 1540–1543 | Succeeded by John Mason; William Honnyng |
Peerage of England
| New title | Baron Paget; 1549–1563 | Succeeded by Henry Paget |
