= Henry Paget, 2nd Baron Paget =

Member of the Parliament of England

- Born: c. 1537
- Died: 28 December 1568
- Noble family: Paget
- Spouse: Catherine Knyvett
- Issue: Elizabeth Paget
- Father: William Paget, 1st Baron Paget
- Mother: Anne Preston

Henry Paget, 2nd Baron Paget (c. 1537 – 28 December 1568) was an English MP and peer.

== Life ==
Henry Paget was the eldest son of William Paget,1st Baron Paget of Beaudesert, Staffordshire and his wife Anne Preston, the daughter of Henry Preston. He was born around 1537. He was knighted in 1553, and succeeded to the title at the death of his father in 1563.

Paget was elected as a Member of Parliament (MP) for Arundel in 1555 and for Lichfield in 1559 and 1563.

In 1567, Paget married Catherine Knyvet, daughter of Henry Knyvet.

Paget and Catherine had a daughter, Elizabeth, who was four months old when Paget died on 28 December 1568. He was buried at West Drayton.

Since Paget died without male issue, it has generally been thought that the title passed immediately to his brother, Thomas, as 3rd Baron Paget. However, according to a decision of the House of Lords in 1570, Henry Paget was succeeded in the title in 1568 by his daughter, Elizabeth, and it was not until 1570 that his brother, Thomas, became Lord Paget, with the death of Elizabeth Paget on 29 June 1570.

== Citations ==
Peerage of England
Preceded by William Paget	Baron Paget; 1563–1568	Succeeded by Thomas Paget
