= Thomas Paget, 3rd Baron Paget =

English nobleman (c.1544–1590)

Thomas Paget, 3rd Baron Paget (c. 1544 – 1590) was an English peer, the second son of William Paget, 1st Baron Paget. He succeeded to the barony in 1568 at the death of his elder brother, Henry Paget, 2nd Baron Paget.

== Family ==
Thomas Paget, born about 1544, was the second son of William Paget, 1st Baron Paget, and Anne Preston (d. 1587), the daughter of Henry Preston. He had three brothers, Henry, Charles and Edward (died young), and six sisters, Etheldreda, who married Sir Christopher Allen; Eleanor, who married firstly, Jerome Palmer, esquire, and secondly, Sir Rowland Clarke; Grisold, who married firstly, Sir Thomas Rivett, and secondly, Sir William Waldegrave; Joan (or Jane), who married Thomas Kitson, son of Sir Thomas Kitson and Margaret Donnington; Dorothy, who married Sir Thomas Willoughby (d. 1559); and Anne (d. 1590), who married Sir Henry Lee.

== Career ==
Paget matriculated at Gonville and Caius College, Cambridge on 27 May 1559, and in 1561 was admitted to the Middle Temple. He succeeded his elder brother, Henry Paget, 2nd Baron Paget in 1568, 'and (according to the decision of the House of Lords governing the succession of this title in 1770) succeeded his niece Elizabeth as the fourth holder of the Paget peerage in 1570, accordingly receiving a summons to parliament in 1571'.

By this time, he had married Nazareth Newton a wealthy widow and former lady-in-waiting. The marriage was unhappy and they separated by 1582.

== Conspiracy ==
Thomas Paget and his brother Charles were both devout Catholics, and would not conform to the Protestant religion of Queen Elizabeth I. Aided by Henry Percy, Paget fled to Paris on the uncovering of the Throckmorton Plot in November 1583, joining his brother Charles who had been in exile there since 1581. The failed conspiracy's plan was for an invasion of England by French forces under the command of Henry, Duke of Guise, financed by Philip II of Spain. English Catholics would then rise up and depose Elizabeth, placing Catholic Mary, Queen of Scots on the English throne.

After his flight to France Elizabeth issued a proclamation commanding Thomas Paget to return to England. In June 1584 a formal demand for the surrender of Paget was made to the King of France through the English ambassador, which was not carried out.

Whilst in Paris in 1586 Paget with his brother Charles became embroiled in the Babington Plot to again depose the Queen and place Mary, Queen of Scots on the English throne. His activities were reported by Lewes Lewkenor, another Catholic exile, who wrote that Thomas Morgan,

drew wholly unto his faction the lord Paget, the bishop of Dunblane, a Scotchman of great credit and gravity; C. Paget, T. Throckmorton, Ralfe Liggons, and sundry other that esteem themselves to be of the better sort. Notwithstanding all which, so effectual and forcible were the means with which they practiced against him, that they got him to be imprisoned in Paris, laying to his charge, that he was an intelligencer for sir Frances Walsingham, a traitor to the service of the Queen his mistress, and from time to time a discoverer of her practices, and withal procured the Queen to conceive exceedingly ill of him, and taking the receivership of her dowry in France from him, to bestow the same upon the bishop of Ross.

== Attainted ==
In 1587 Thomas and his brother were attainted of treason by act of parliament. Thomas Paget's honours were forfeited and their properties were confiscated by the Crown. Paget received a pension of 180 crowns per month from Philip II and died in Brussels in early 1590. In 1603 Elizabeth I died. In 1604 James I, son of Mary Queen of Scots, restored the Paget family lands and honours to Thomas Paget's Protestant son, William.

== Notes ==
Peerage of England
Preceded by Henry Paget	Baron Paget; 1568–1587	Vacant Forfeit Title next held by William Paget
