= 1974 Pacific typhoon season =

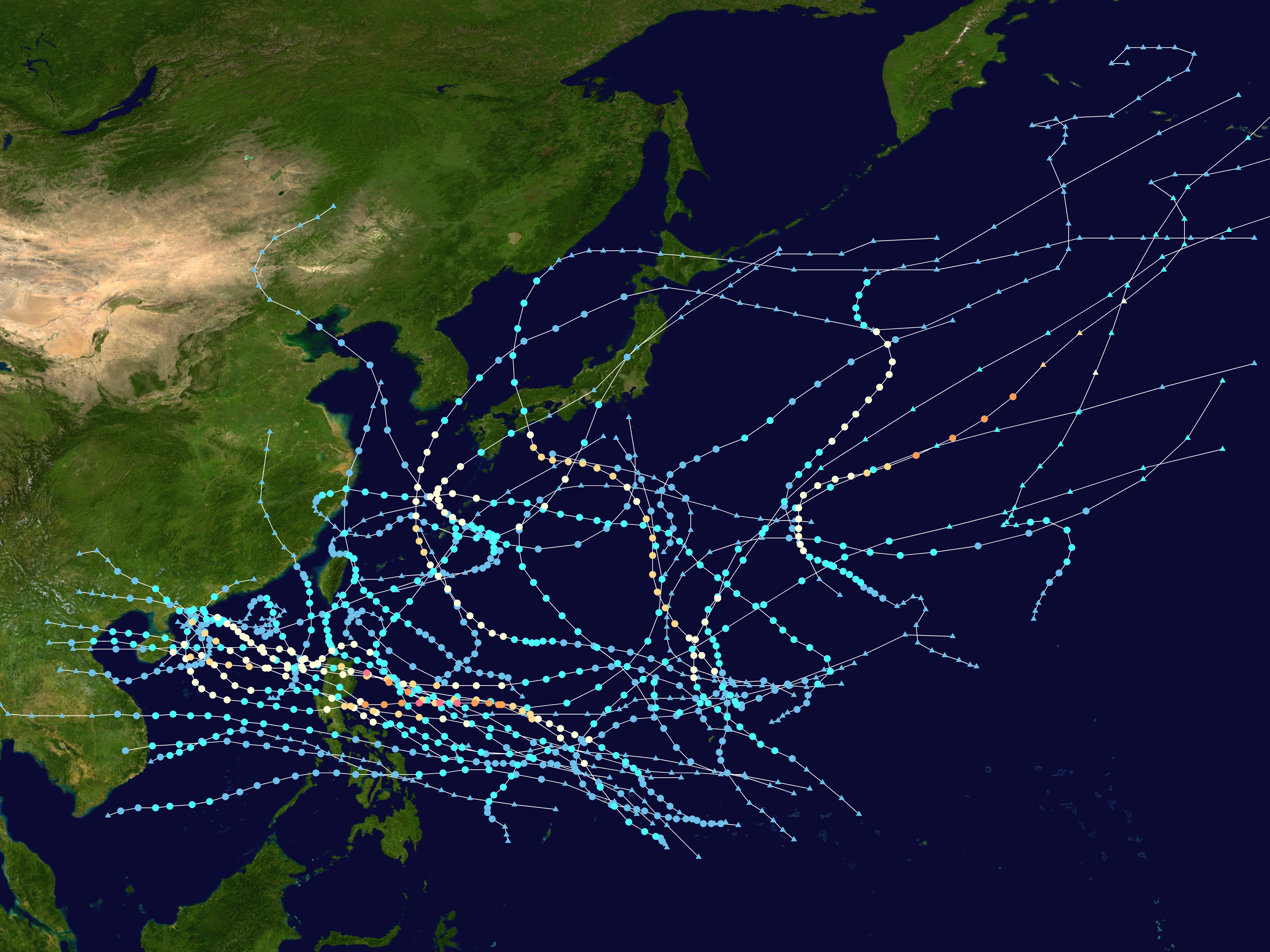
- Season summary map

Seasonal boundaries
- First system formed: January 8, 1974
- Last system dissipated: December 24, 1974

Strongest storm
- Name: Gloria
  - Maximum winds: 220 km/h (140 mph) (1-minute sustained)
  - Lowest pressure: 930 hPa (mbar)

Seasonal statistics
- Total depressions: 55
- Total storms: 32
- Typhoons: 16
- Total fatalities: > 361
- Total damage: > $1.55 billion (1974 USD)

Related articles
- 1974 Atlantic hurricane season; 1974 Pacific hurricane season; 1974 North Indian Ocean cyclone season

The 1974 Pacific typhoon season was the first season on record to not feature a Category 5-equivalent super typhoon; a feature later repeated by the 1977 and 2017 seasons. Even so, the season was overly active, with 32 tropical storms and 16 typhoons being developed within the year. It has no official bounds; it ran year-round in 1974, but most tropical cyclones tend to form in the northwestern Pacific Ocean between June and December. These dates conventionally delimit the period of each year when most tropical cyclones form in the northwestern Pacific Ocean.

The scope of this article is limited to the Pacific Ocean, north of the equator and west of the International Date Line. Storms that form east of the date line and north of the equator are called hurricanes; see 1974 Pacific hurricane season. Tropical Storms formed in the entire west Pacific basin were assigned a name by the Joint Typhoon Warning Center. Tropical depressions in this basin have the "W" suffix added to their number. Tropical depressions that enter or form in the Philippine area of responsibility are assigned a name by the Philippine Atmospheric, Geophysical and Astronomical Services Administration or PAGASA. This can often result in the same storm having two names.

== Seasonal summary ==
35 tropical depressions formed this year in the Western Pacific, of which 32 became tropical storms. 16 storms reached typhoon intensity, and none reached super typhoon strength. This season is the most recent to have no super typhoons.

== Systems ==
=== Severe Tropical Storm Wanda (Atang) ===
- Severe tropical storm (JMA)
- Tropical storm (SSHWS)
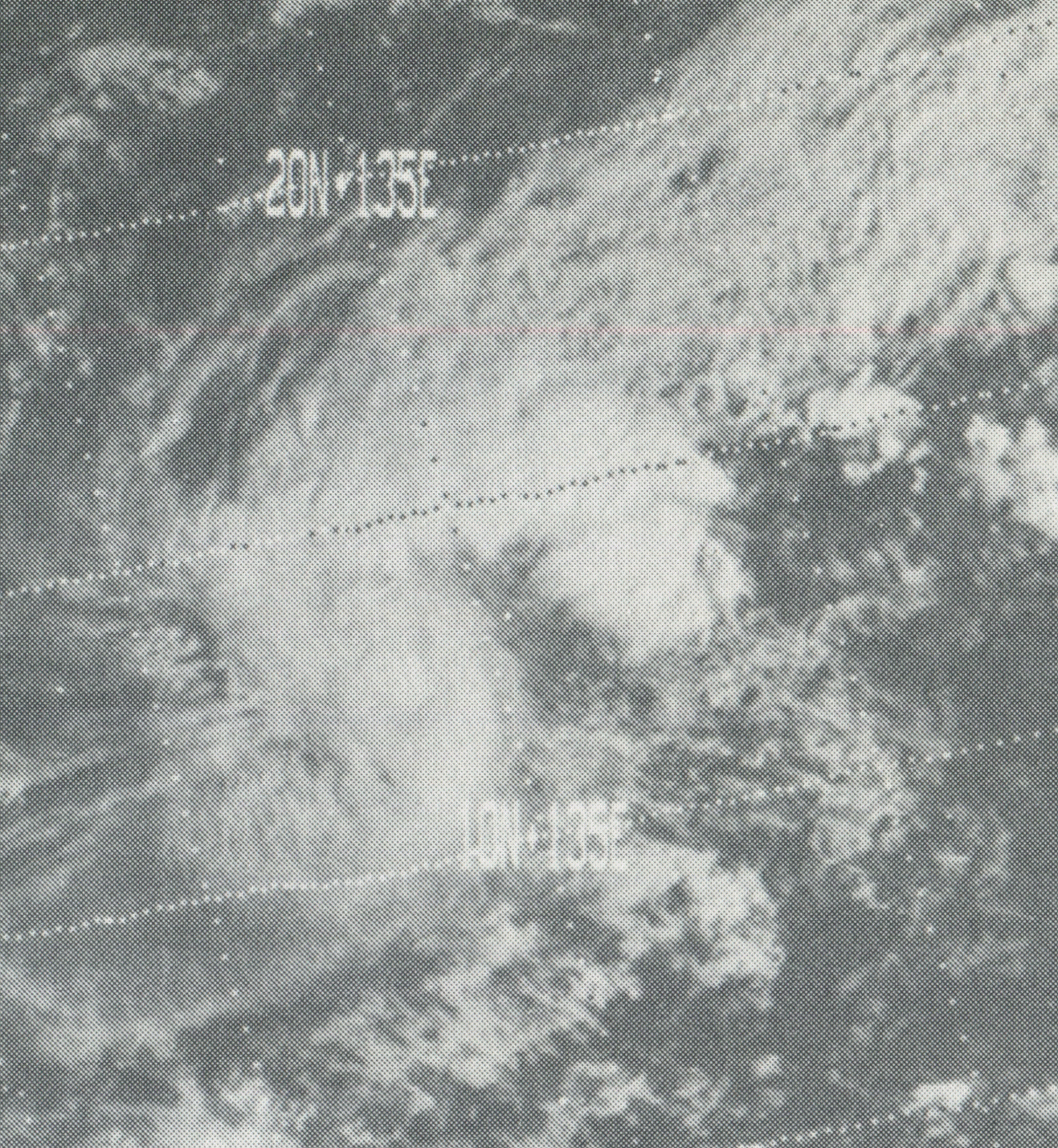
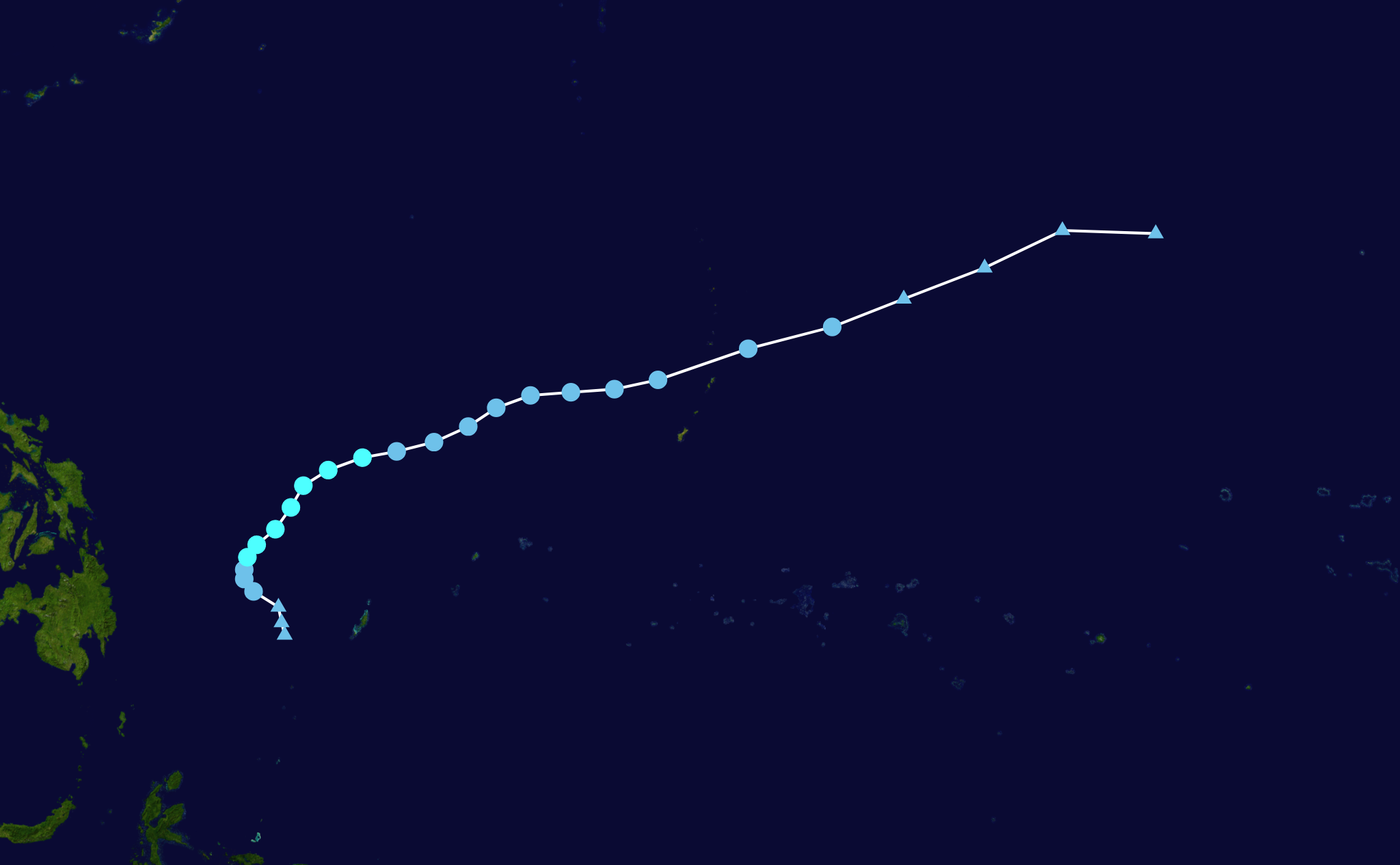
- Duration: January 8 – January 14
- Peak intensity: 100 km/h (65 mph) (1-min); 992 hPa (mbar)

A tropical disturbance developed on January 8 to the southwest of Palau. By the next day, the disturbance was upgraded to a tropical depression and to a tropical storm. Wanda reached its peak intensity on January 10 as a 65 mph tropical storm. The storm was then downgraded to a tropical depression on January 11. Wanda then dissipated on January 14.

=== Tropical Storm Amy ===
- Tropical storm (JMA)
- Tropical storm (SSHWS)
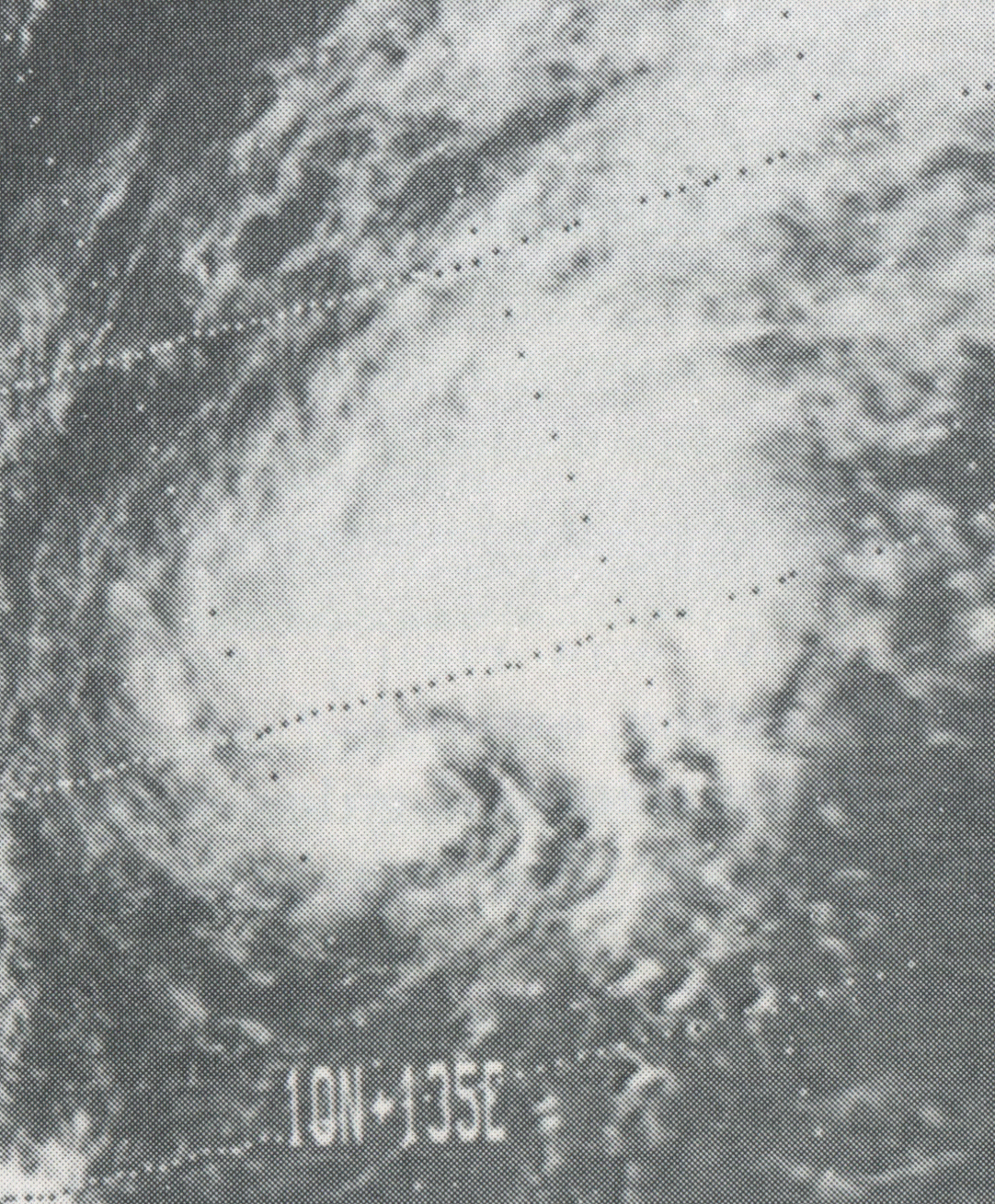
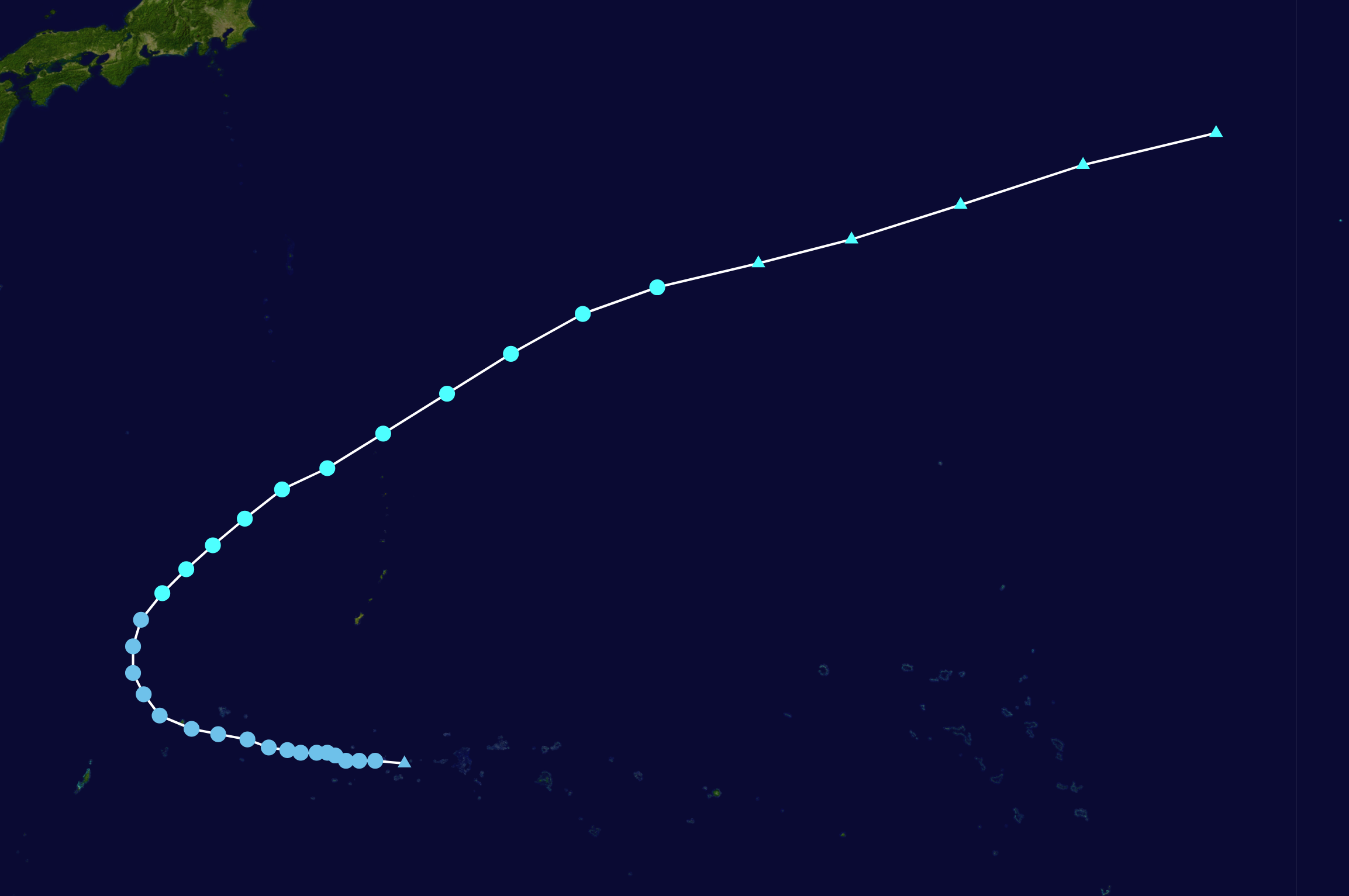
- Duration: March 12 – March 20
- Peak intensity: 100 km/h (65 mph) (1-min); 992 hPa (mbar)

Tropical Storm Amy formed as a tropical disturbance well south of Guam on March 12, and became a tropical depression on the 14th. It began to turn right late on the 15th, and was heading northeast on the 17th. It became a tropical storm the same day. It transitioned into an extratropical storm on the 19th, and dissipated shortly thereafter.

=== Severe Tropical Storm Babe ===
- Severe tropical storm (JMA)
- Tropical storm (SSHWS)
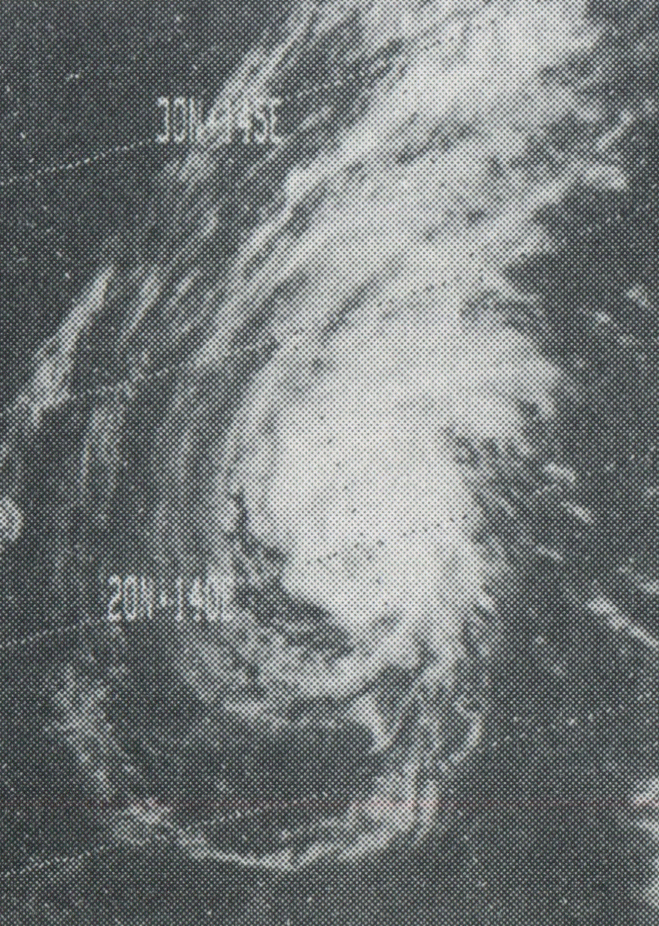
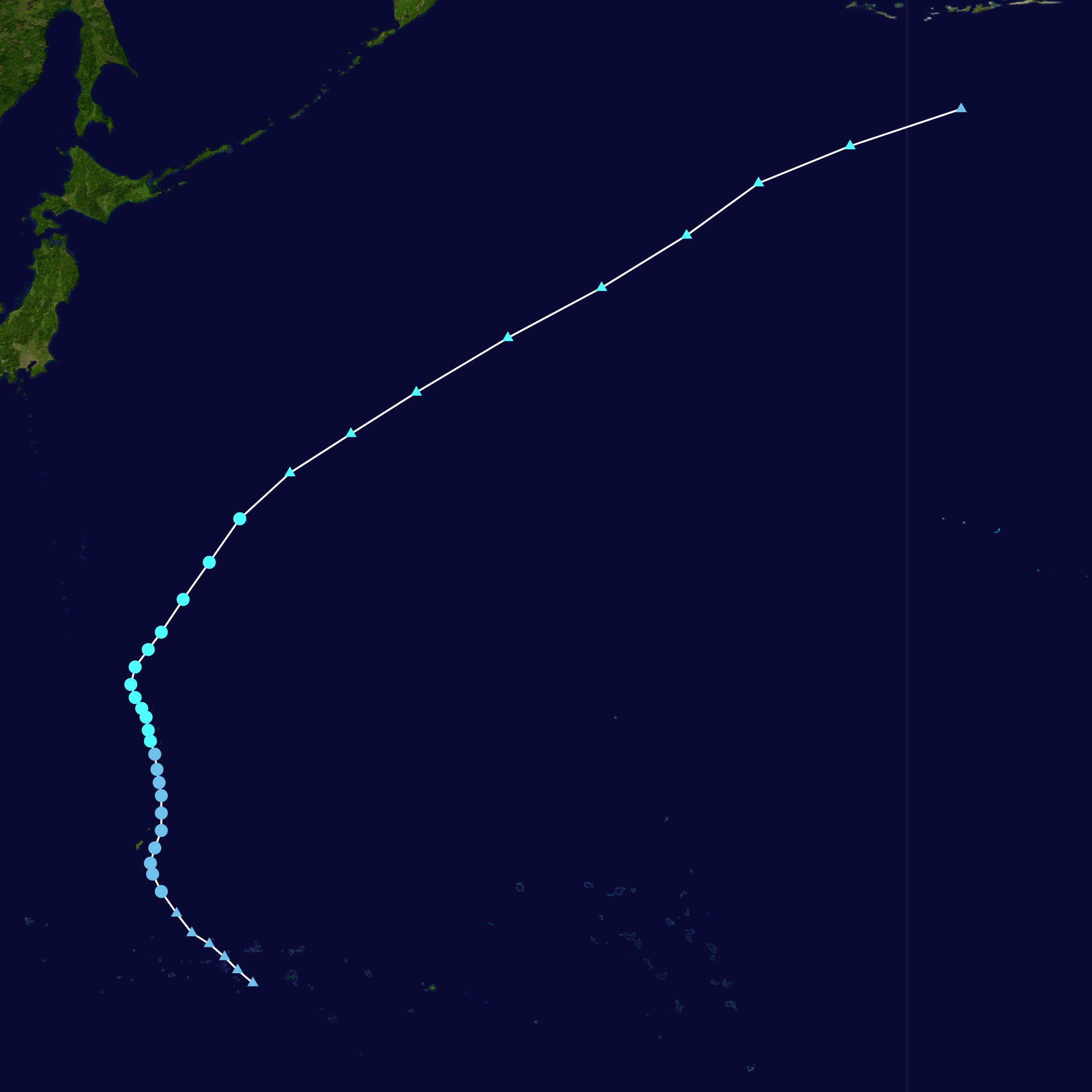
- Duration: April 25 – May 3
- Peak intensity: 110 km/h (70 mph) (1-min); 985 hPa (mbar)

Tropical Storm Babe formed as a disturbance just west of Chuuk on the 25th of April. It traveled northwestward, becoming a tropical depression on the 26th as it started to turn northward. It passed just west of Guam and Saipan on the 27th and 28th, before strengthening to a tropical storm on the 29th. It continued northward, becoming extratropical on the 1st of May. As an extratropical storm, it traveled northeastward for a few days before dissipating.

=== Typhoon Carla ===
- Typhoon (JMA)
- Category 1-equivalent typhoon (SSHWS)
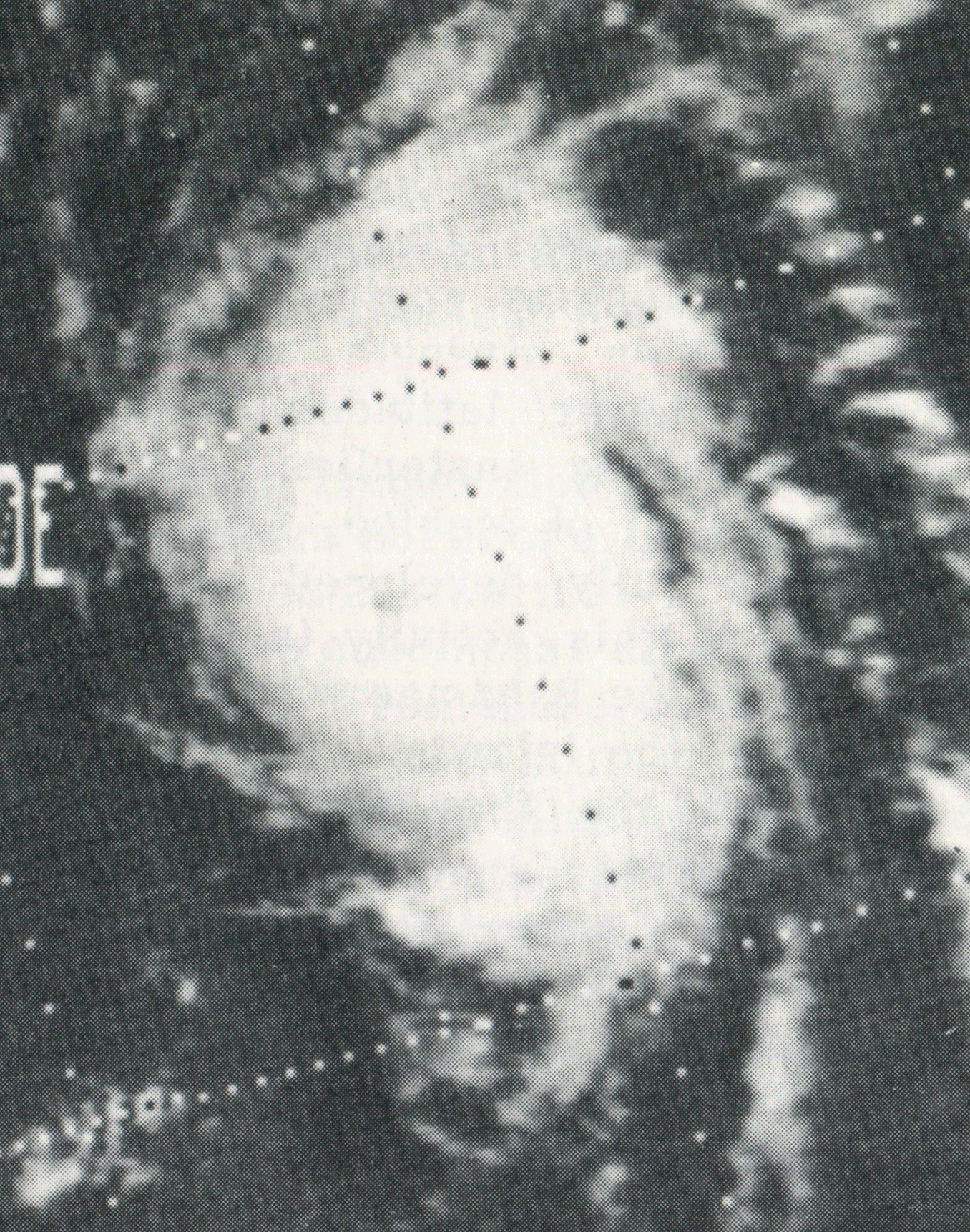
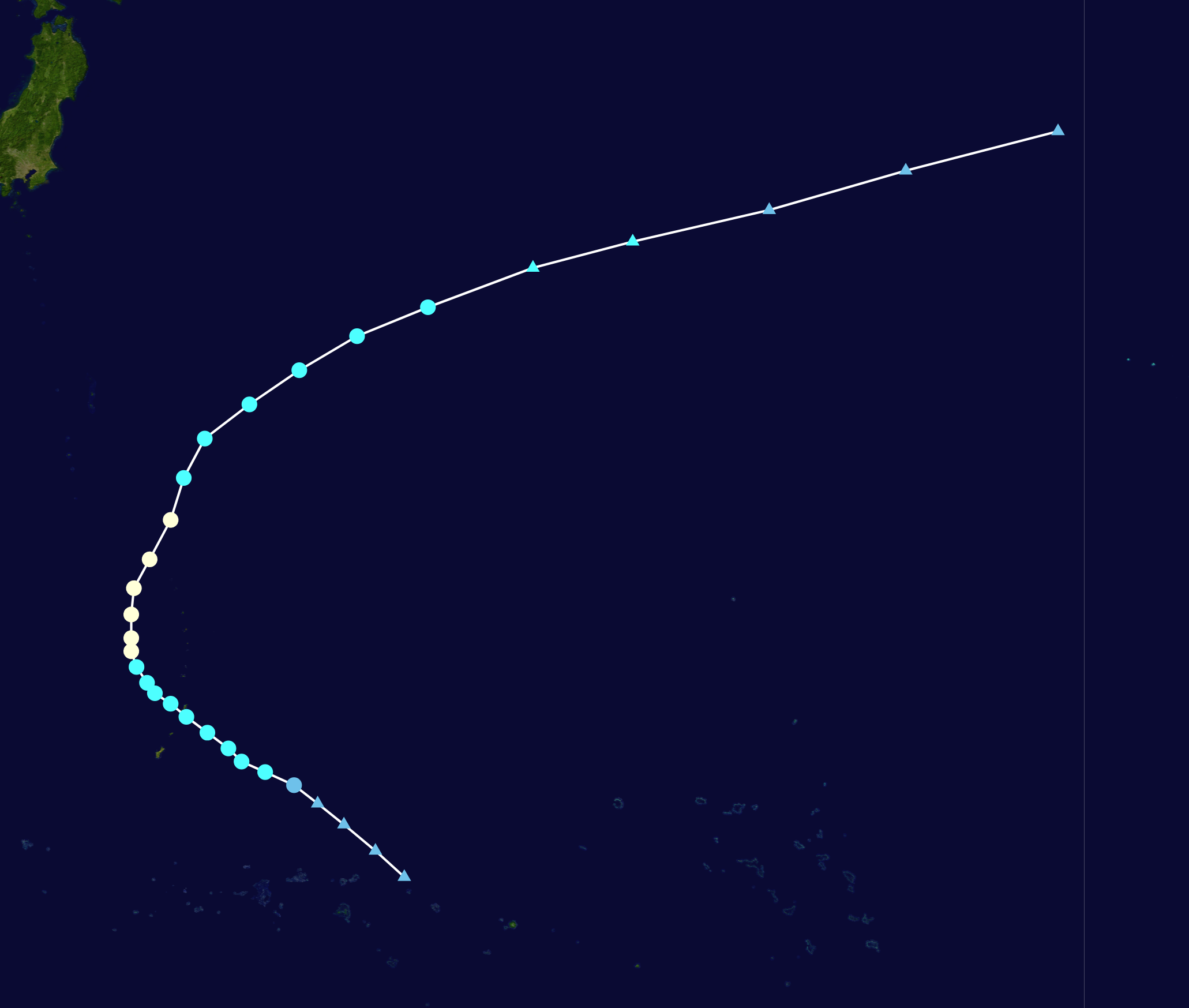
- Duration: May 1 – May 7
- Peak intensity: 150 km/h (90 mph) (1-min); 965 hPa (mbar)

Typhoon Carla was first noted as a disturbance near the island of Pohnpei on the 29th of April. The disturbance traveled northwestward over the next four days, developing into a tropical storm on the 2nd. The center of Carla passed over Tinian and Saipan on the 3rd. The storm began to turn towards the north later that day. It strengthened into a typhoon on the 4th. It reached its maximum intensity — 965 mb central pressure and 80 to 85-knot winds — on the 5th. It began to weaken under intensifying shear after that, becoming a tropical storm again very late that day. It continued in a northeast direction before being absorbed by a frontal system on the 6th.

=== Typhoon Dinah (Bising) ===
- Typhoon (JMA)
- Category 1-equivalent typhoon (SSHWS)
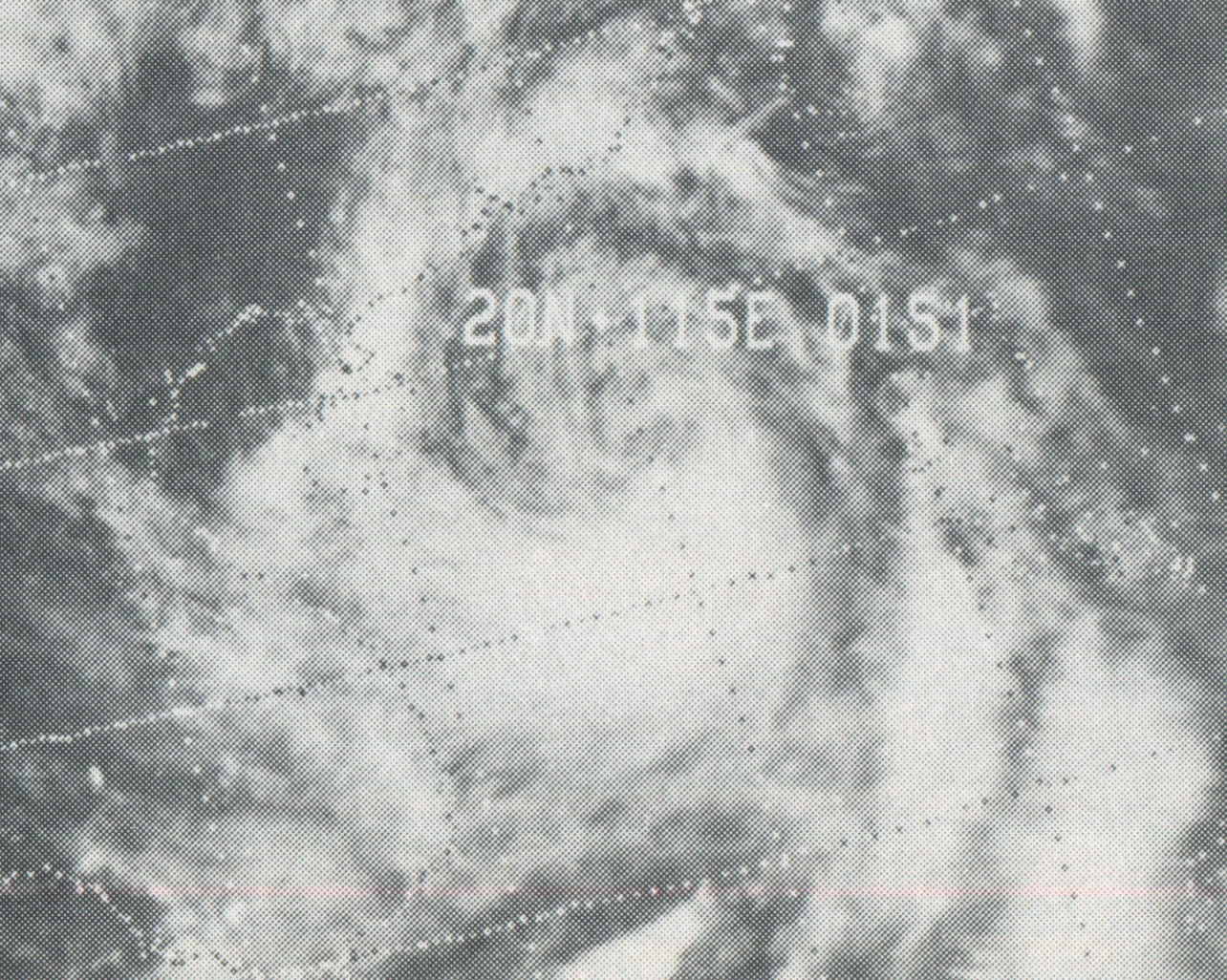
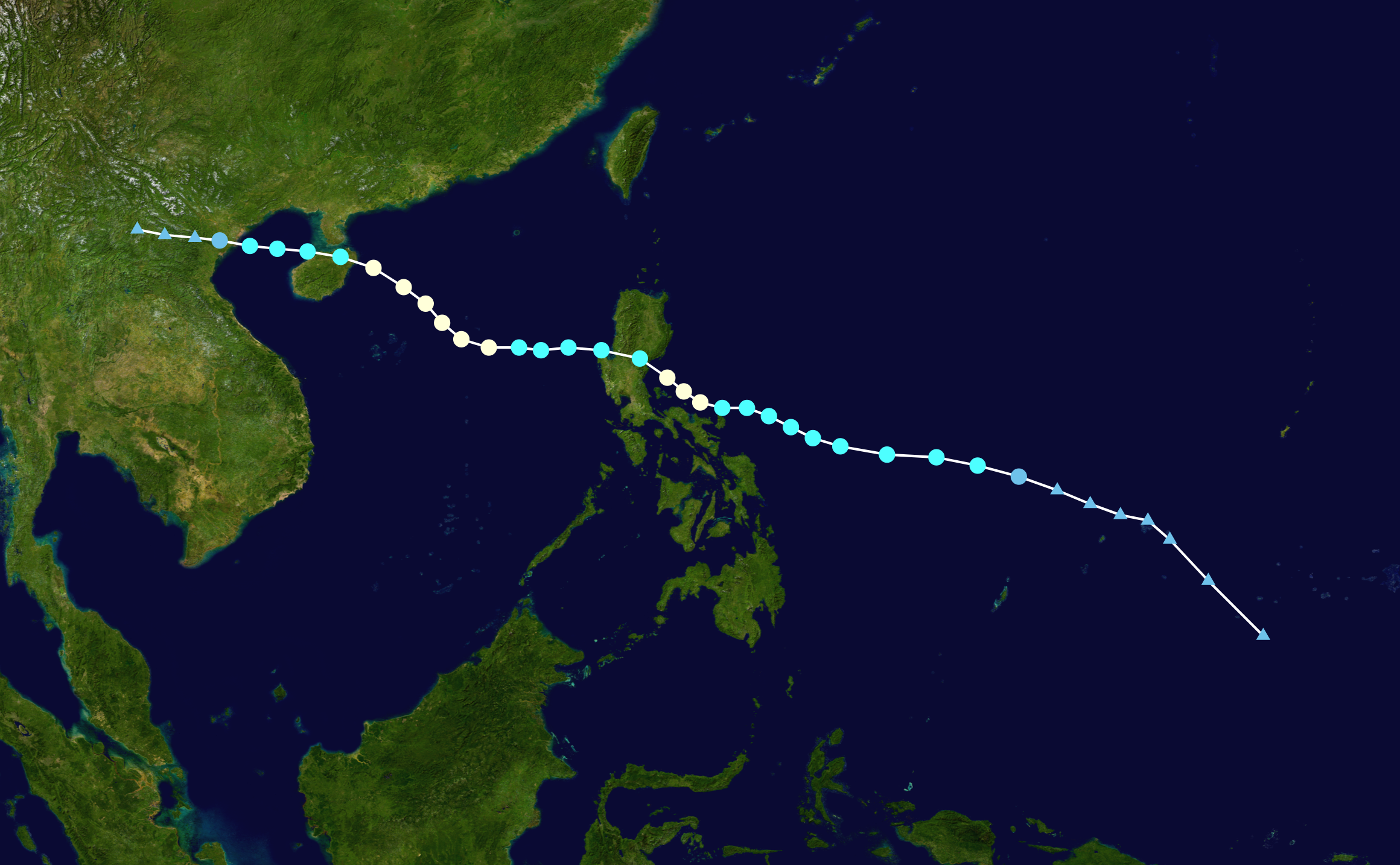
- Duration: June 5 – June 14
- Peak intensity: 130 km/h (80 mph) (1-min); 965 hPa (mbar)

Dinah, which developed on June 7, hit Luzon on the 10th as an 80 mph typhoon. It continued northwestward, hit Hainan Island, crossed the Gulf of Tonkin, and dissipated over North Vietnam. Dinah caused 73 casualties (with 33 missing), with $3 million in crop damage (1974 USD).

=== Tropical Depression 05W ===
- Tropical depression (JMA)
- Tropical depression (SSHWS)
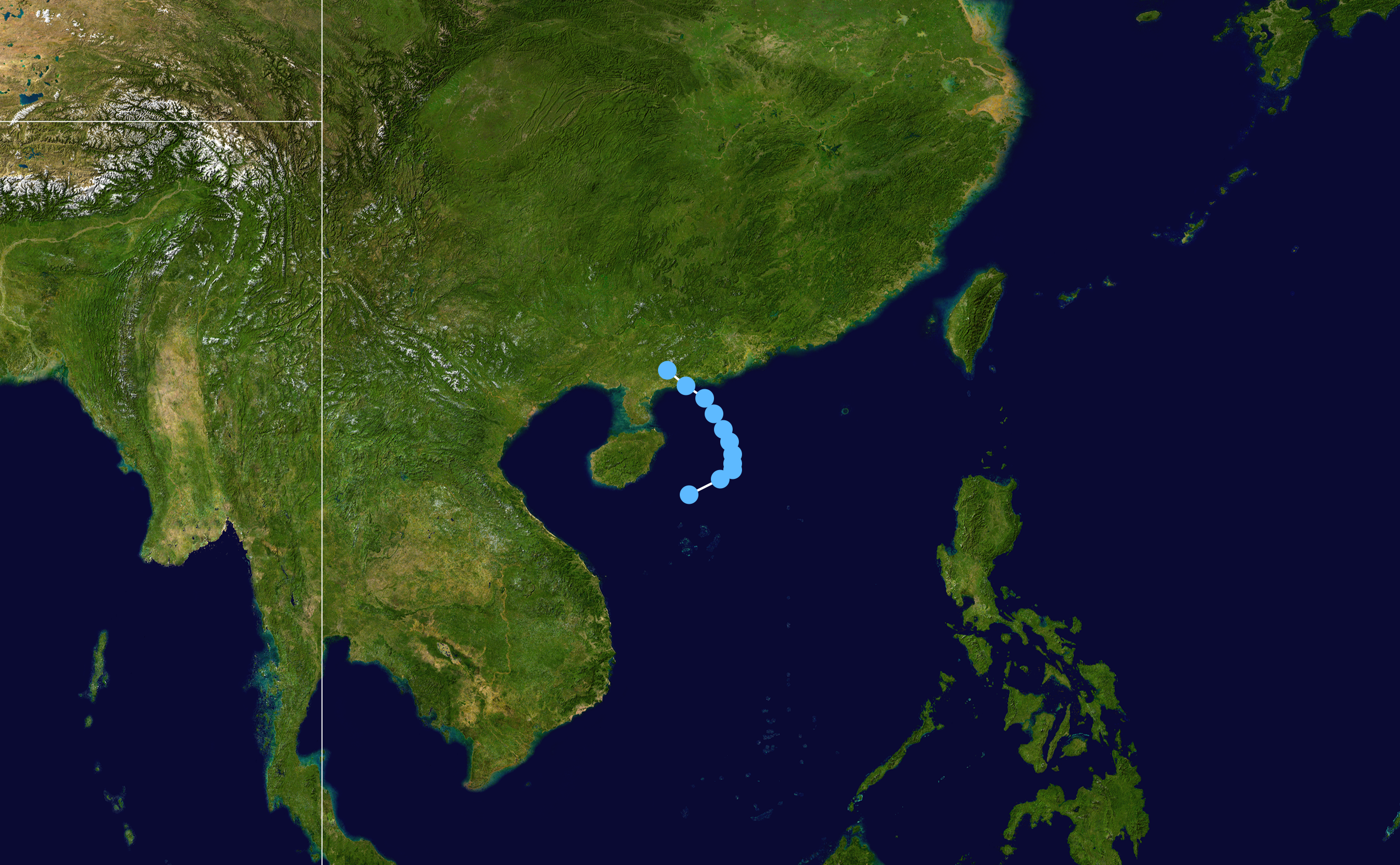
- Duration: June 6 – June 8
- Peak intensity: 55 km/h (35 mph) (1-min); 1000 hPa (mbar)

5W lasted two days and struck southern China.

=== Severe Tropical Storm Emma (Klaring) ===
- Severe tropical storm (JMA)
- Tropical storm (SSHWS)
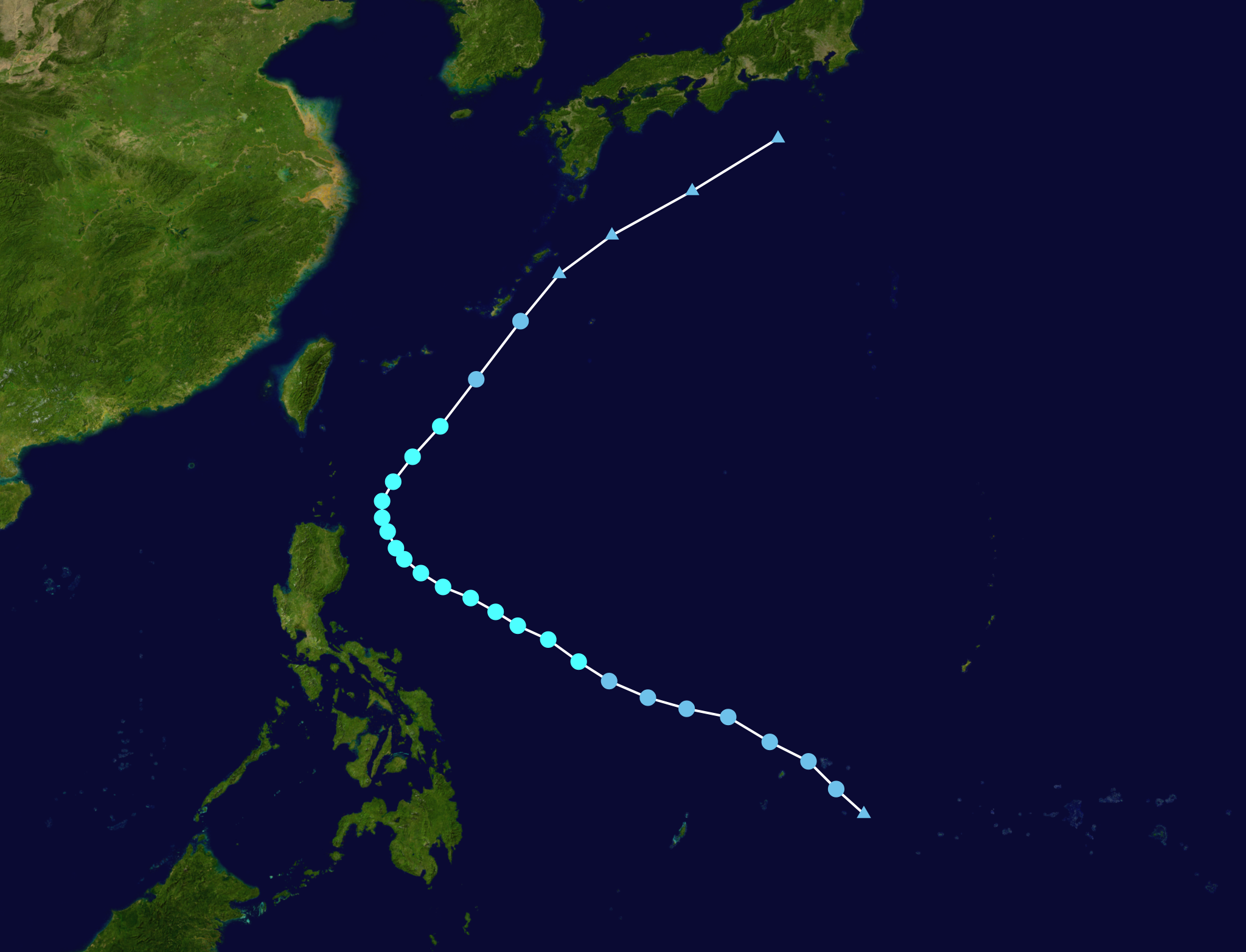
- Duration: June 12 – June 19
- Peak intensity: 110 km/h (70 mph) (1-min); 990 hPa (mbar)

Emma stayed as a tropical storm.

=== Tropical Storm Freda ===
- Tropical storm (JMA)
- Tropical storm (SSHWS)
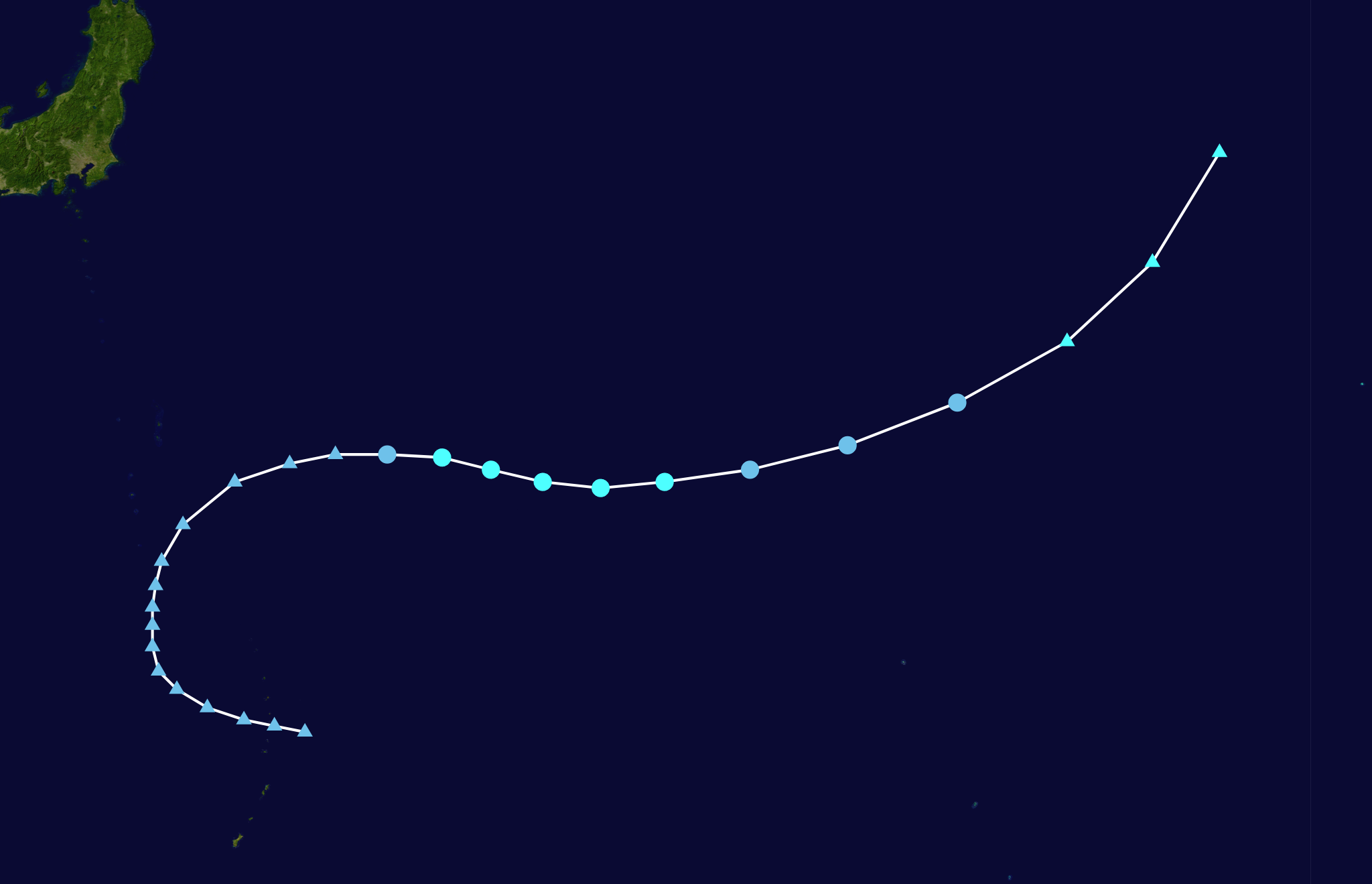
- Duration: June 17 – June 23
- Peak intensity: 85 km/h (50 mph) (1-min); 990 hPa (mbar)

Freda peaked as a moderate tropical storm.

=== Typhoon Gilda (Deling) ===
- Typhoon (JMA)
- Category 2-equivalent typhoon (SSHWS)
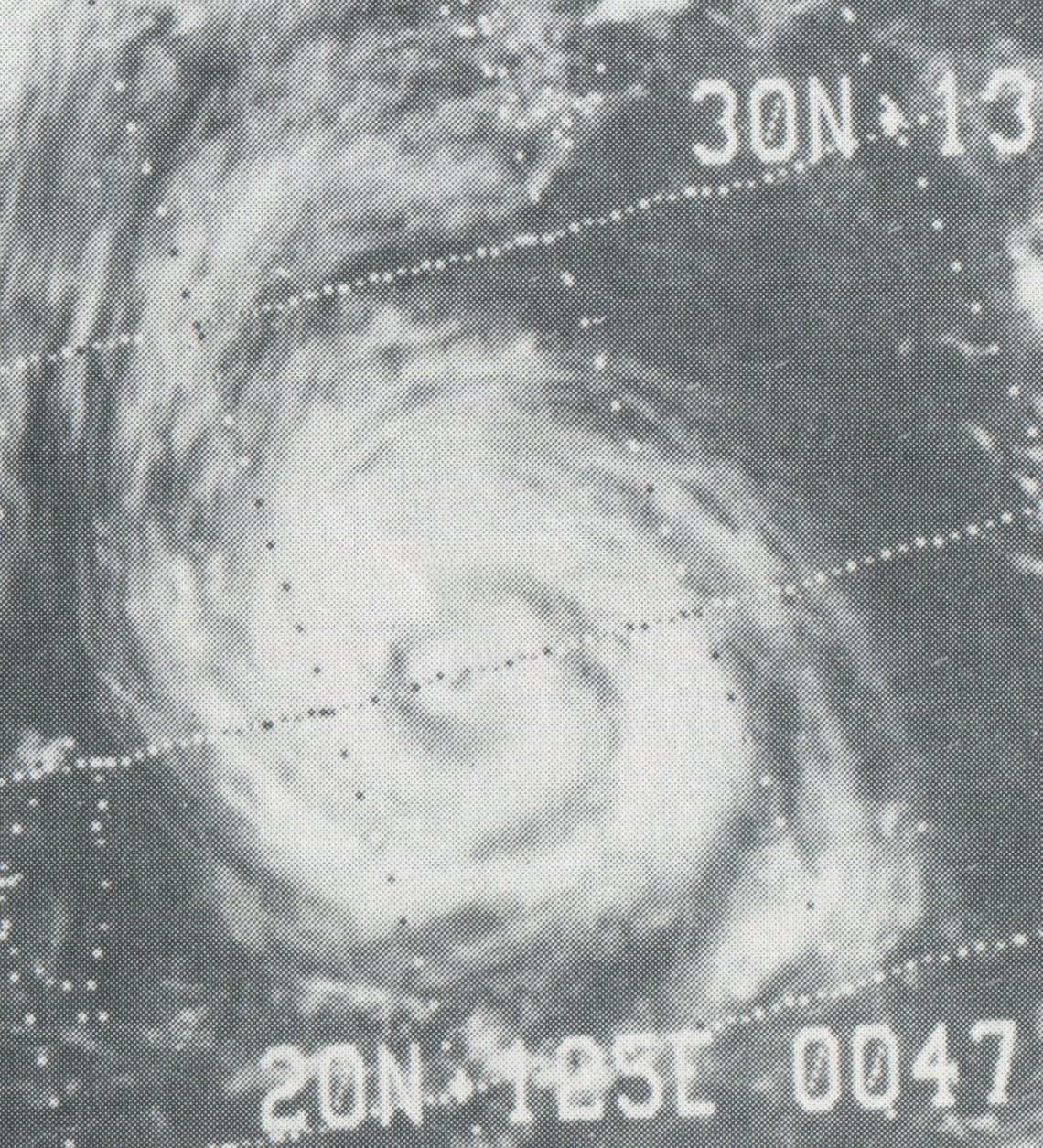
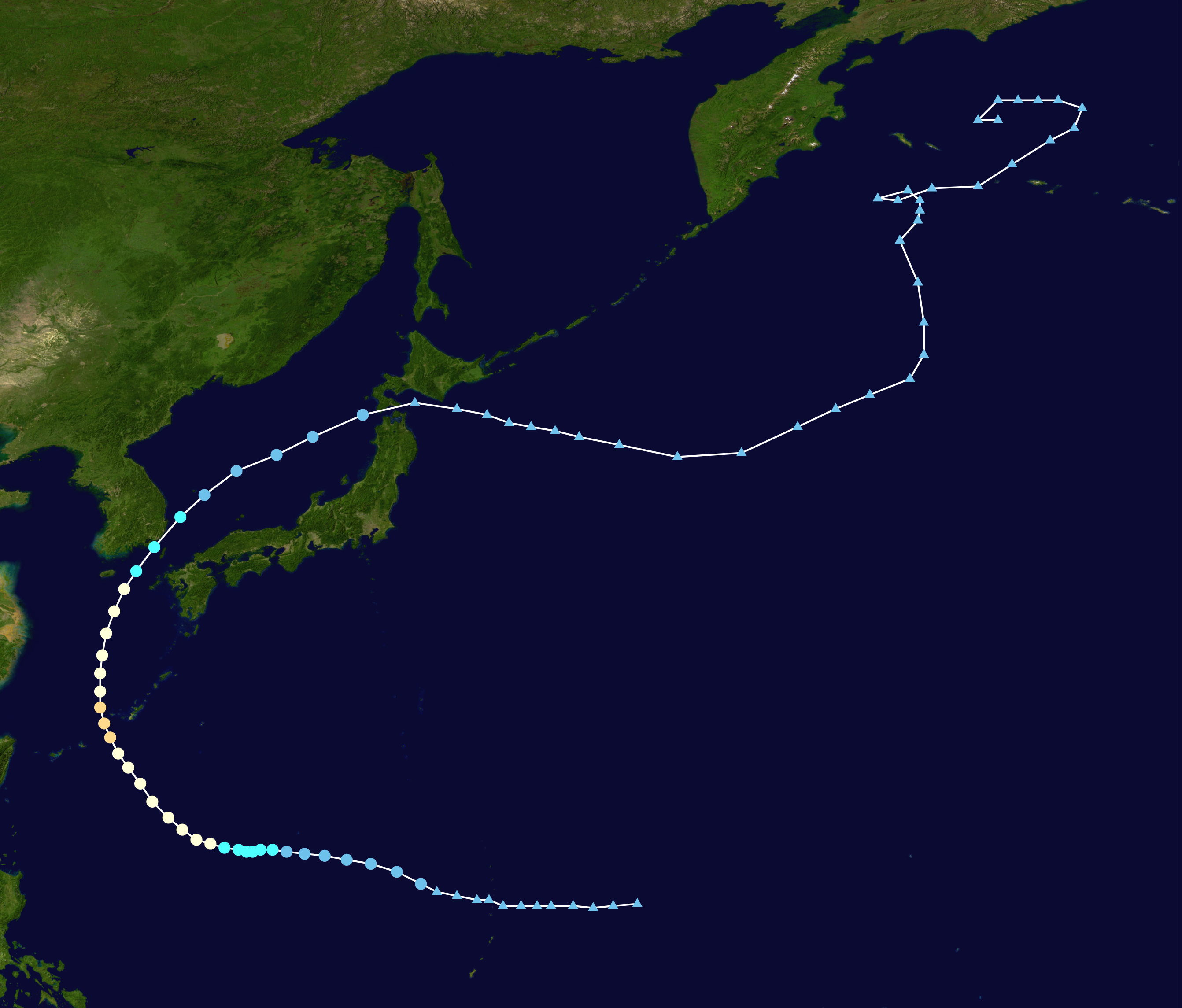
- Duration: June 26 – July 8
- Peak intensity: 165 km/h (105 mph) (1-min); 945 hPa (mbar)

When Tropical Storm Gilda, having weakened from a peak of 100 mph winds, crossed between Japan and South Korea in early July, it brought torrential rains and mudslides, killing 128 people (with 26 missing) and causing damage estimated at $1.5 billion (1974 USD).

=== Tropical Storm Harriet (Gading) ===
- Tropical storm (JMA)
- Tropical storm (SSHWS)
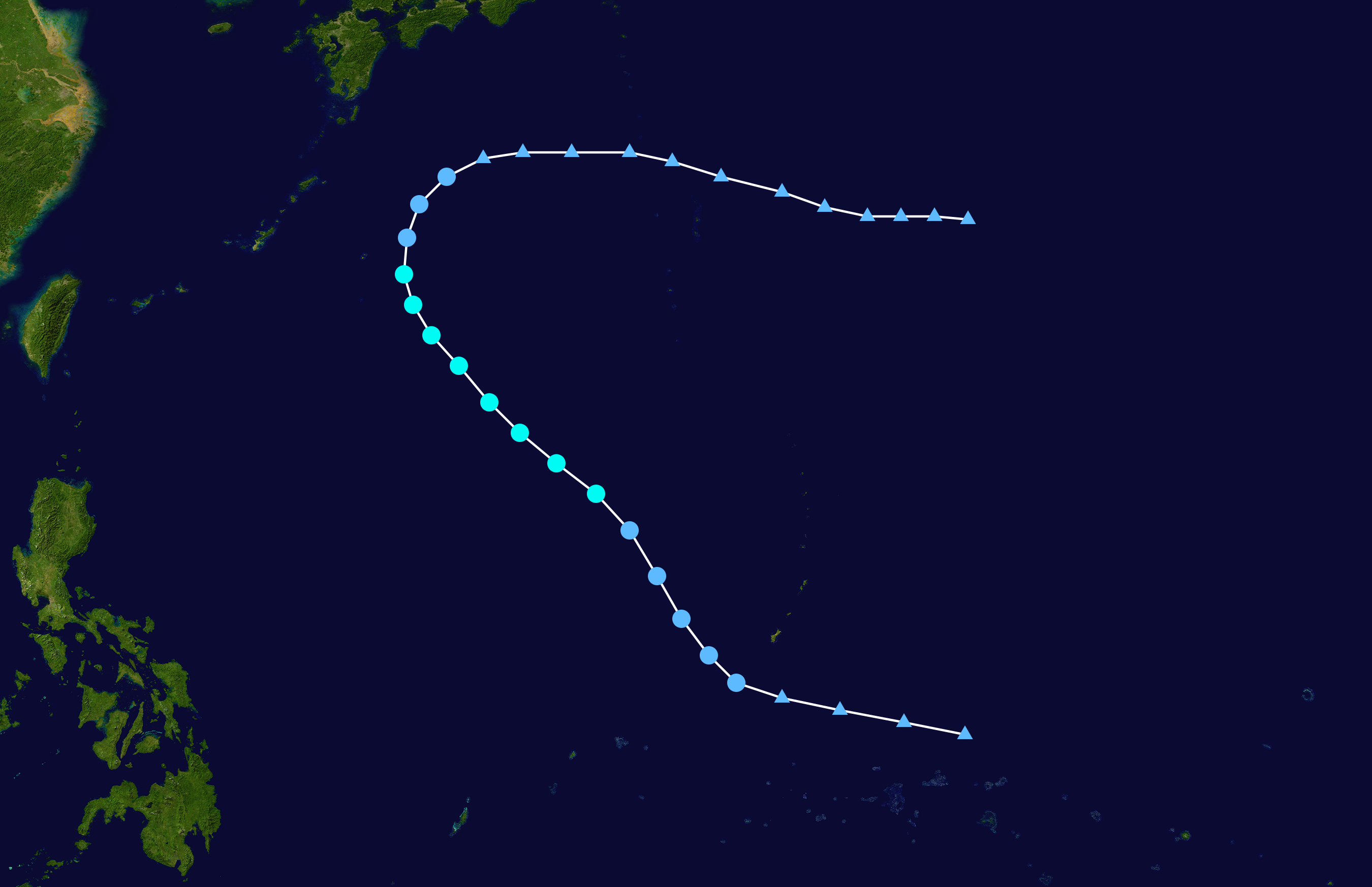
- Duration: July 13 – July 20
- Peak intensity: 85 km/h (50 mph) (1-min); 996 hPa (mbar)

Harriet did not affect land.

=== Typhoon Ivy (Iliang) ===
- Typhoon (JMA)
- Category 2-equivalent typhoon (SSHWS)
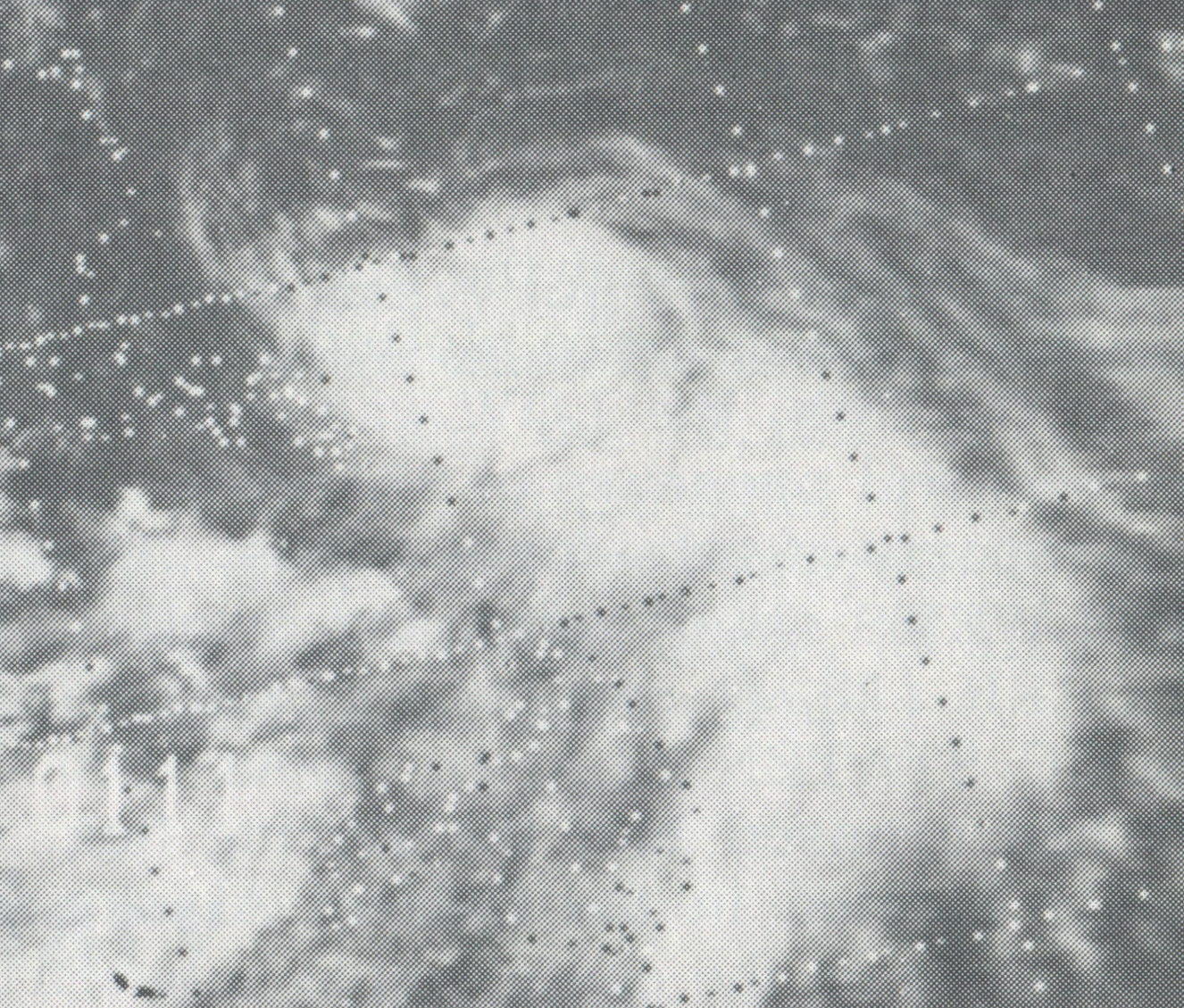
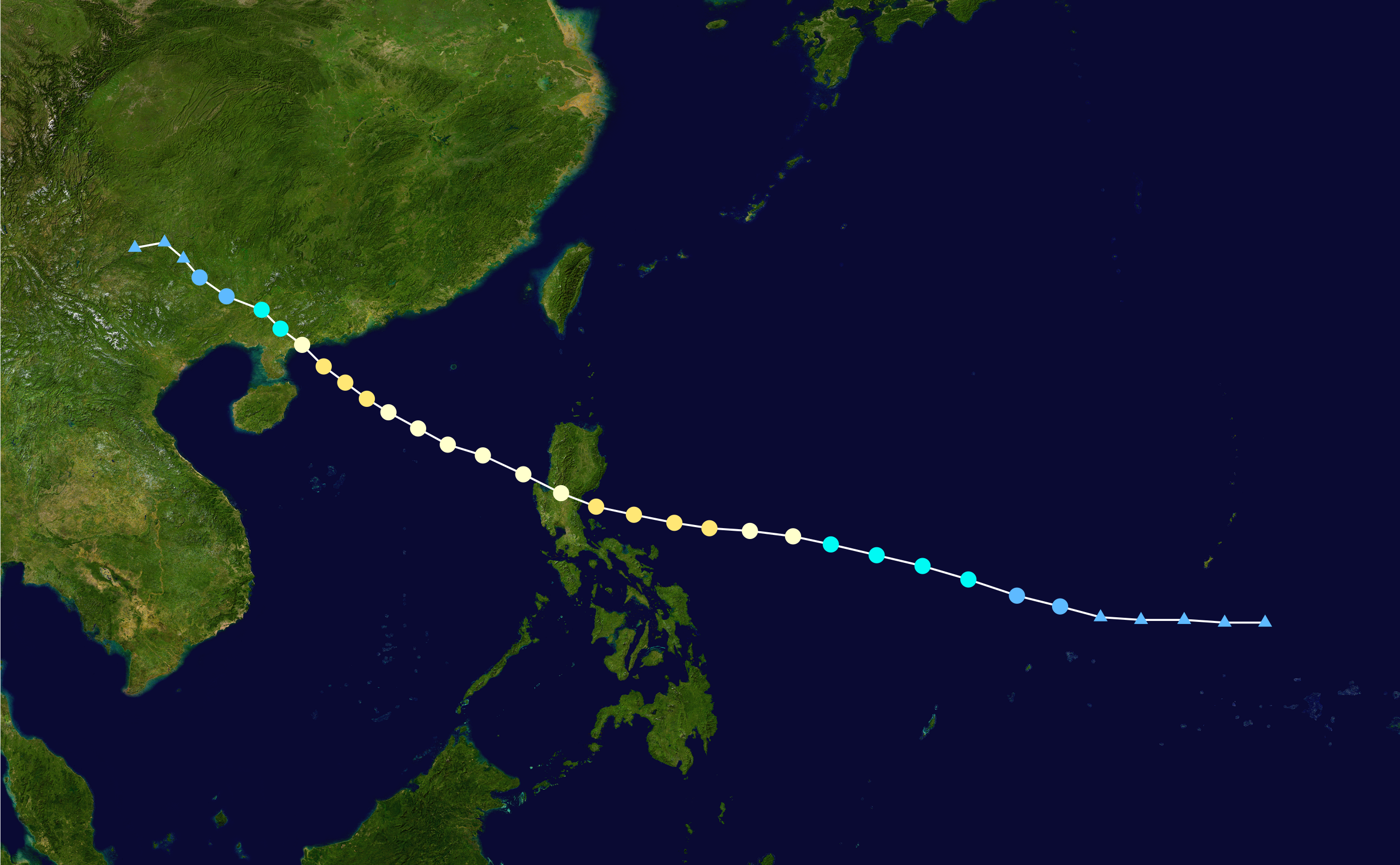
- Duration: July 14 – July 21
- Peak intensity: 175 km/h (110 mph) (1-min); 950 hPa (mbar)

66 people were killed when Typhoon Ivy hit Luzon on July 20, the day before the 1974 Miss Universe was held in Manila. It continued northwestward, and hit southeastern China 2 days later.

=== Severe Tropical Storm Jean (Heling) ===
- Severe tropical storm (JMA)
- Tropical storm (SSHWS)
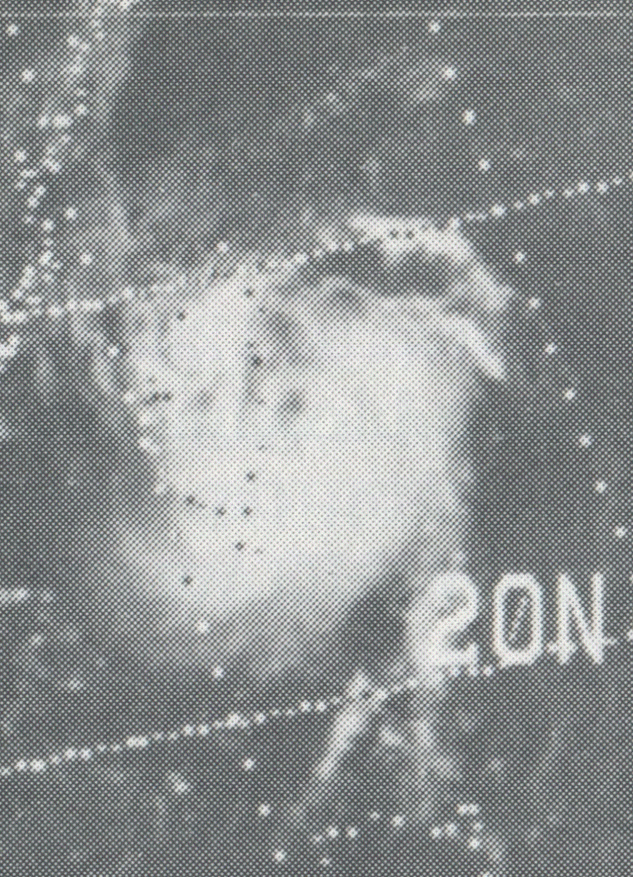
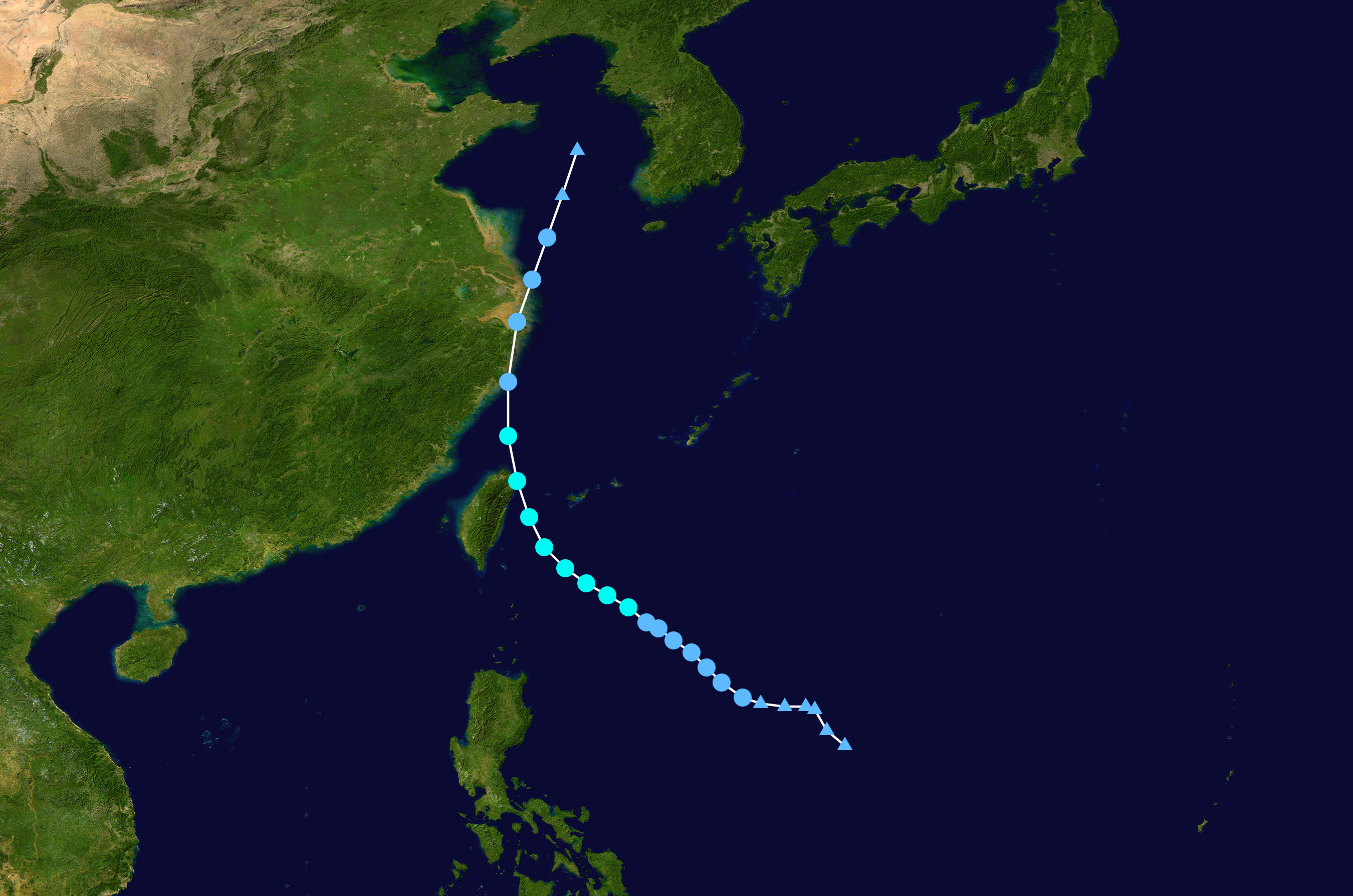
- Duration: July 17 – July 21
- Peak intensity: 85 km/h (50 mph) (1-min); 994 hPa (mbar)

Jean stayed weak.

=== Severe Tropical Storm Kim ===
- Severe tropical storm (JMA)
- Tropical storm (SSHWS)
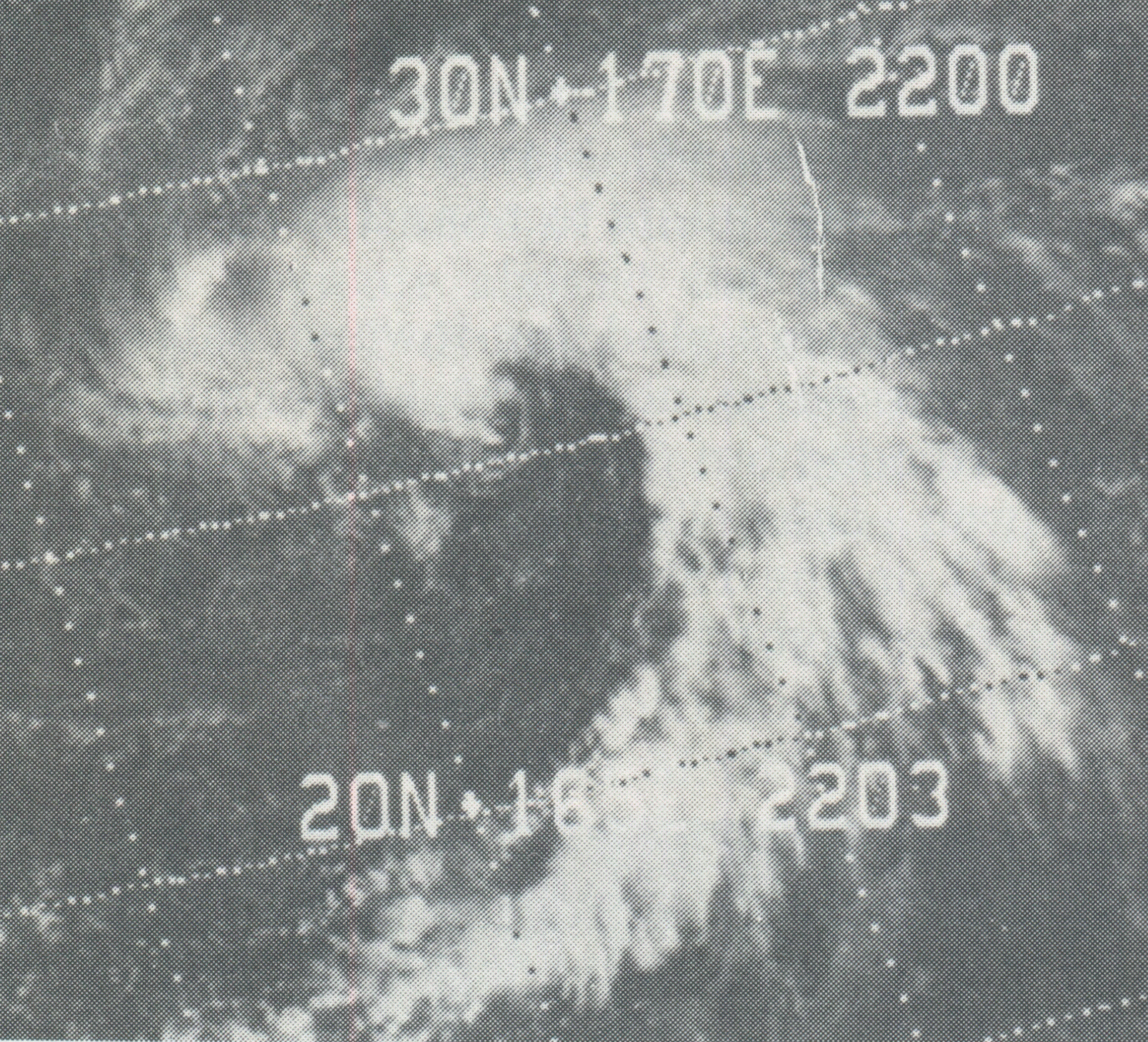
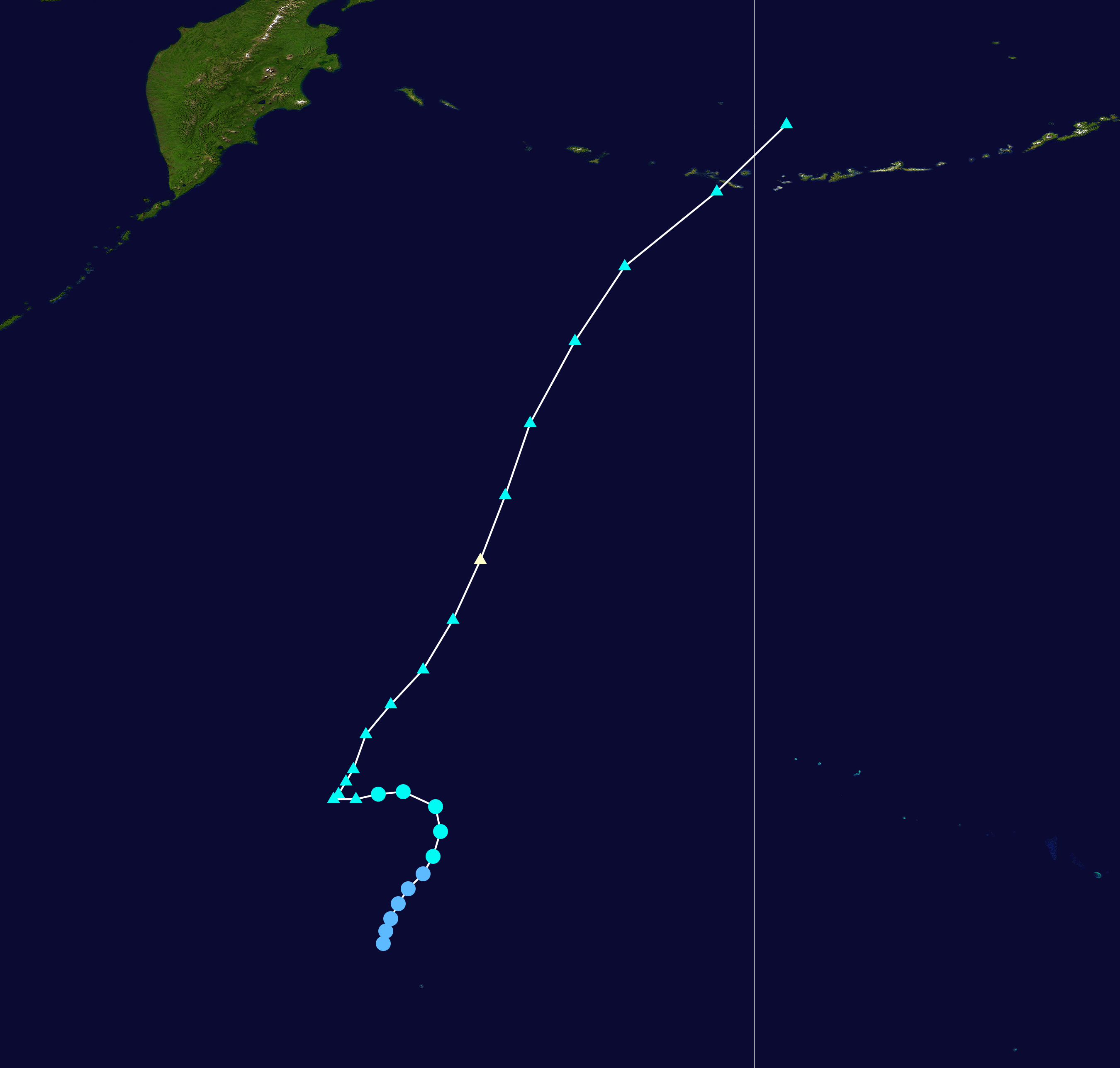
- Duration: July 22 – July 24
- Peak intensity: 95 km/h (60 mph) (1-min); 990 hPa (mbar)

Kim recurved.

=== Tropical Depression Loleng ===
- Tropical depression (PAGASA)
- Duration: August 4 – August 8
- Peak intensity: 55 km/h (35 mph) (10-min); 1004 hPa (mbar)

Only recognized by PAGASA.

=== Tropical Storm Lucy (Miding) ===
- Tropical storm (JMA)
- Tropical storm (SSHWS)
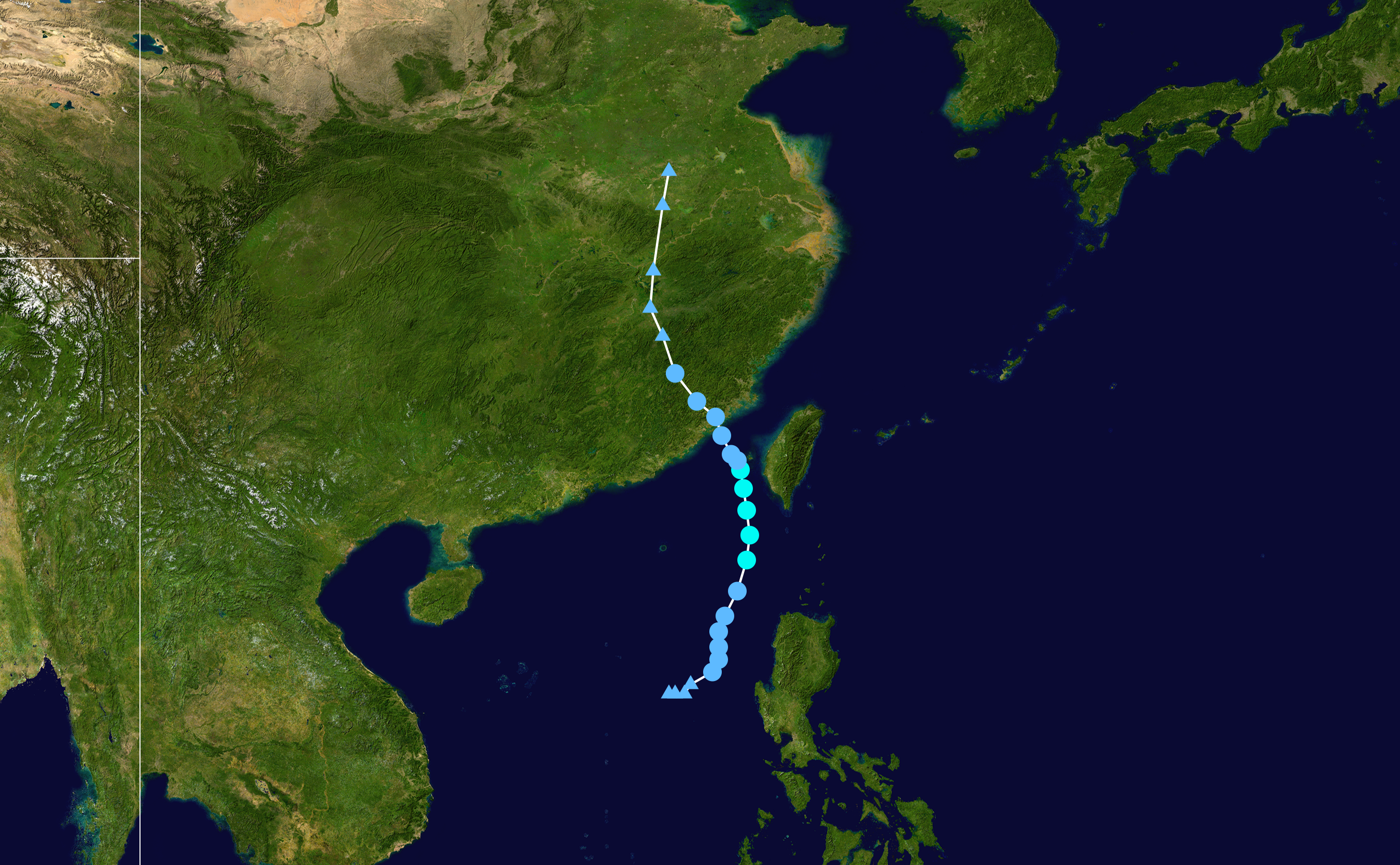
- Duration: August 7 – August 12
- Peak intensity: 65 km/h (40 mph) (1-min); 994 hPa (mbar)

Lucy hit China.

=== Typhoon Mary ===
- Typhoon (JMA)
- Category 1-equivalent typhoon (SSHWS)
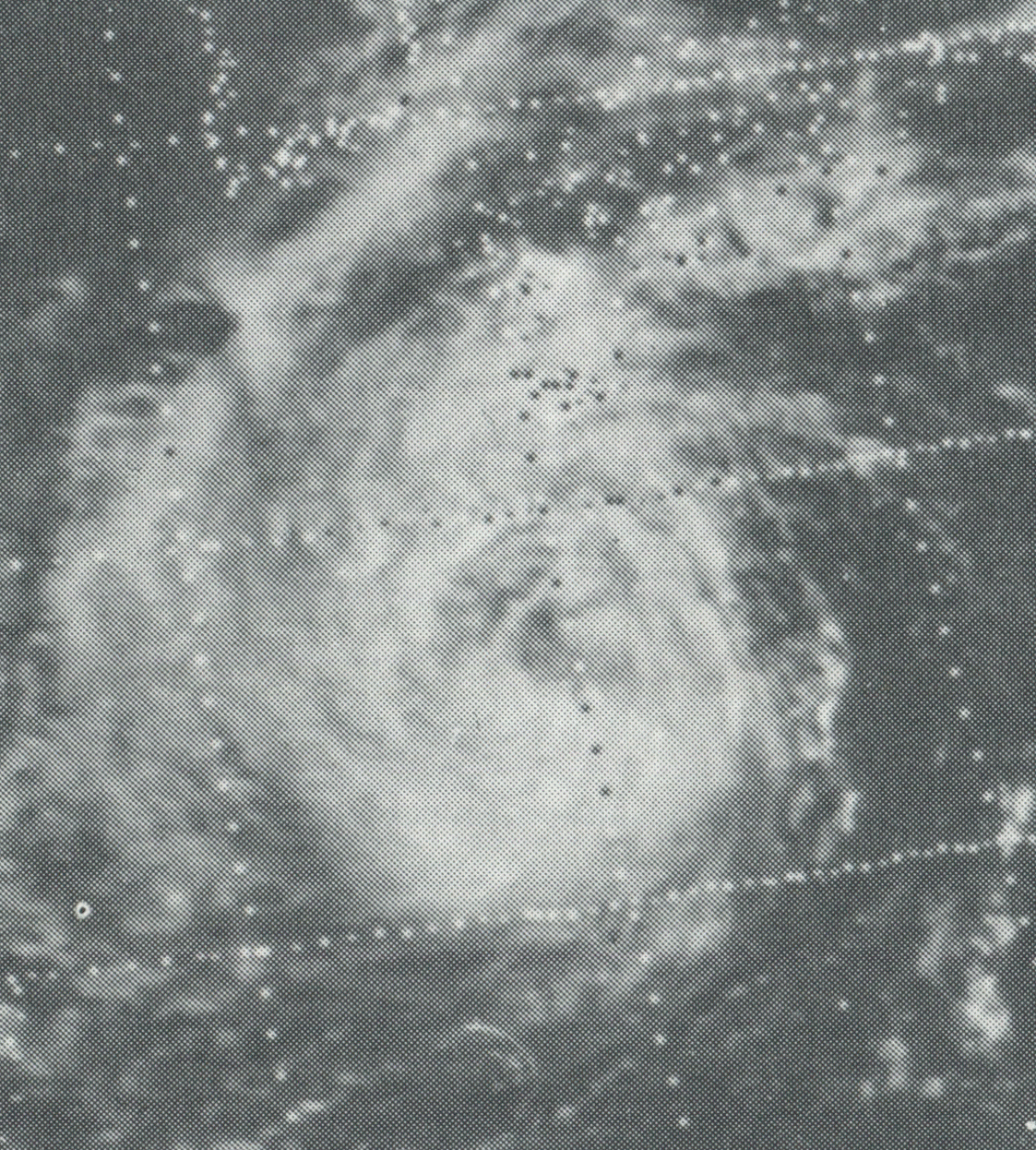
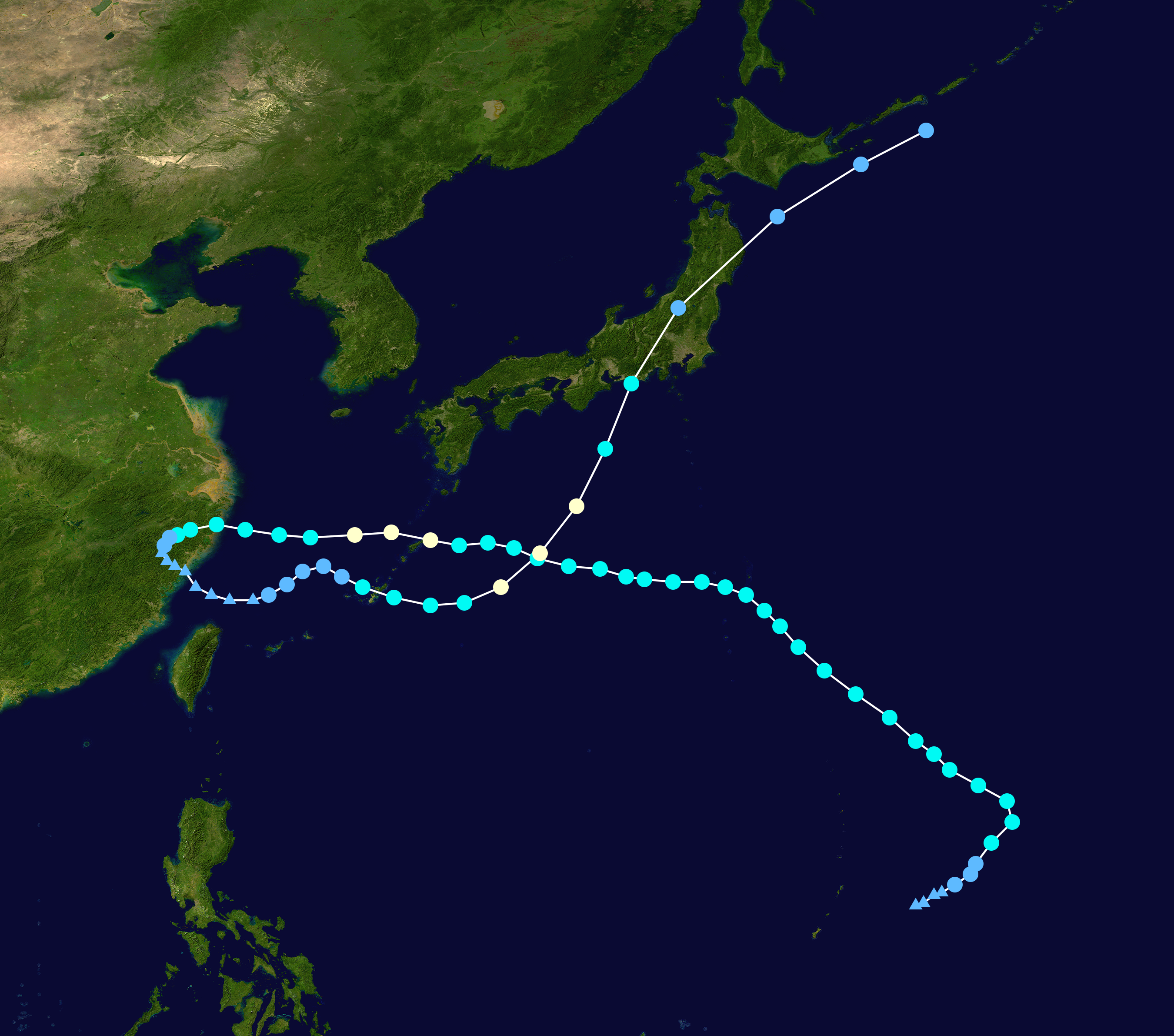
- Duration: August 11 – August 27
- Peak intensity: 130 km/h (80 mph) (1-min); 965 hPa (mbar)

The monsoon trough spawned a tropical depression on August 10. It tracked to the northeast, then turned to the northwest where it became a tropical storm on the 11th. A tug pulling RMS Caronia to Taiwan was overcome by the weather as it sought shelter at Guam, and cut loose Caronia, which was driven against the breakwater at the entrance to Apra Harbor on August 12, blocking all ship traffic. Mary's appearance resembled an extratropical cyclone due to vertical shear, and as the ridge built over Japan, Mary turned more to the west. Conditions were favorable enough for Mary to reach typhoon strength on the 18th, but it weakened to a tropical storm before hitting northeastern China on the 19th. A high pressure system over China forced now Tropical Depression Mary to the southeast, where it restrengthened into a tropical storm on the 24th. The storm turned to the northeast, briefly becoming a typhoon again on the 25th before weakening. Mary hit Japan on the 26th, and dissipated shortly thereafter. 3 people died in Mary's path, with moderate damage occurring.

=== Tropical Depression 16W ===
- Tropical depression (JMA)
- Tropical depression (SSHWS)
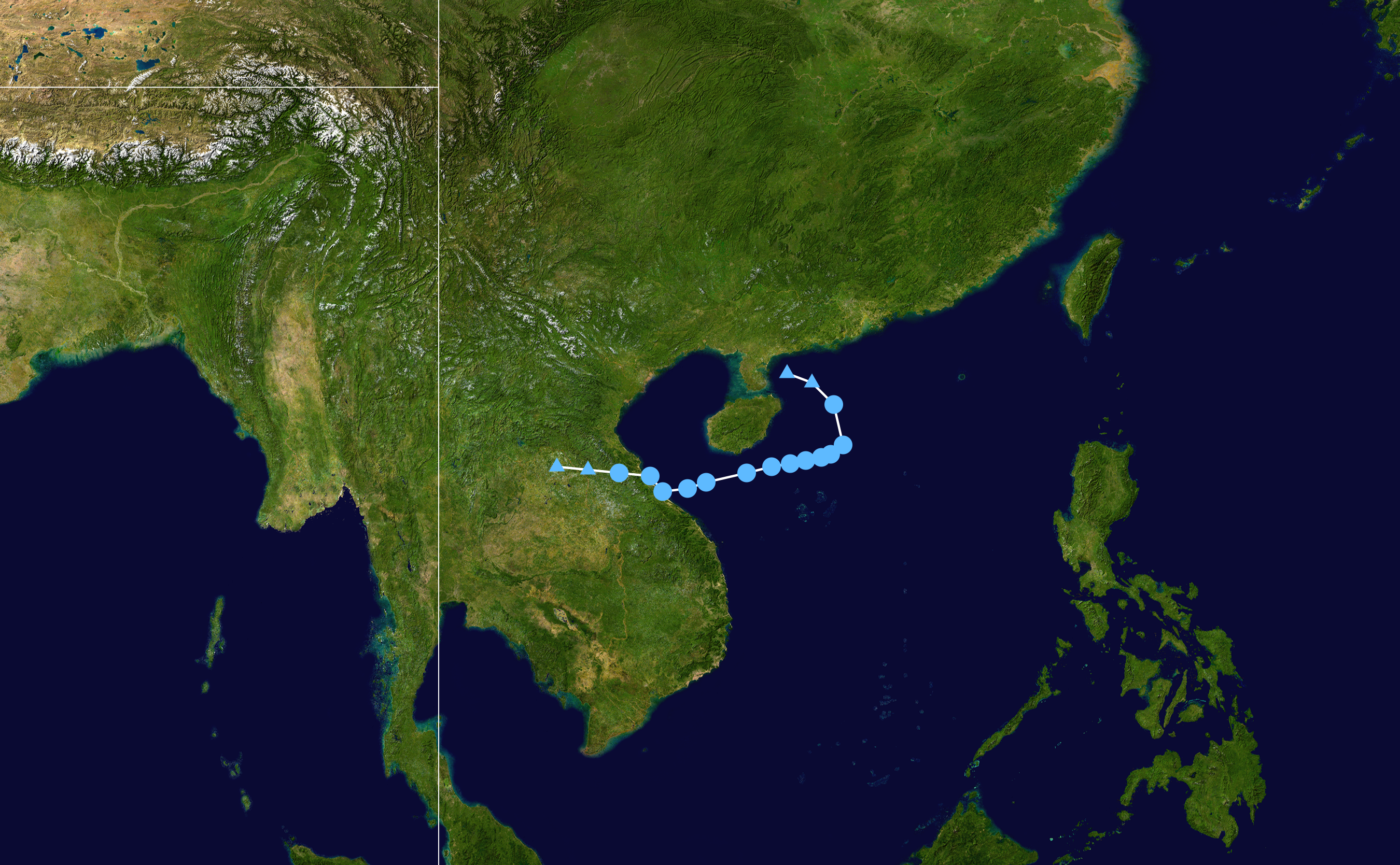
- Duration: August 13 – August 16
- Peak intensity: 55 km/h (35 mph) (1-min); 992 hPa (mbar)

16W was just a tropical depression and also hit Thailand for a very brief moment.

=== Severe Tropical Storm Nadine (Norming) ===
- Severe tropical storm (JMA)
- Tropical storm (SSHWS)
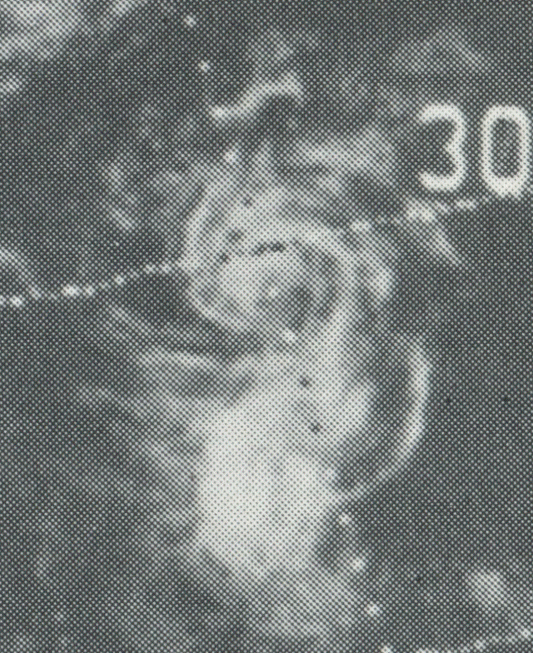
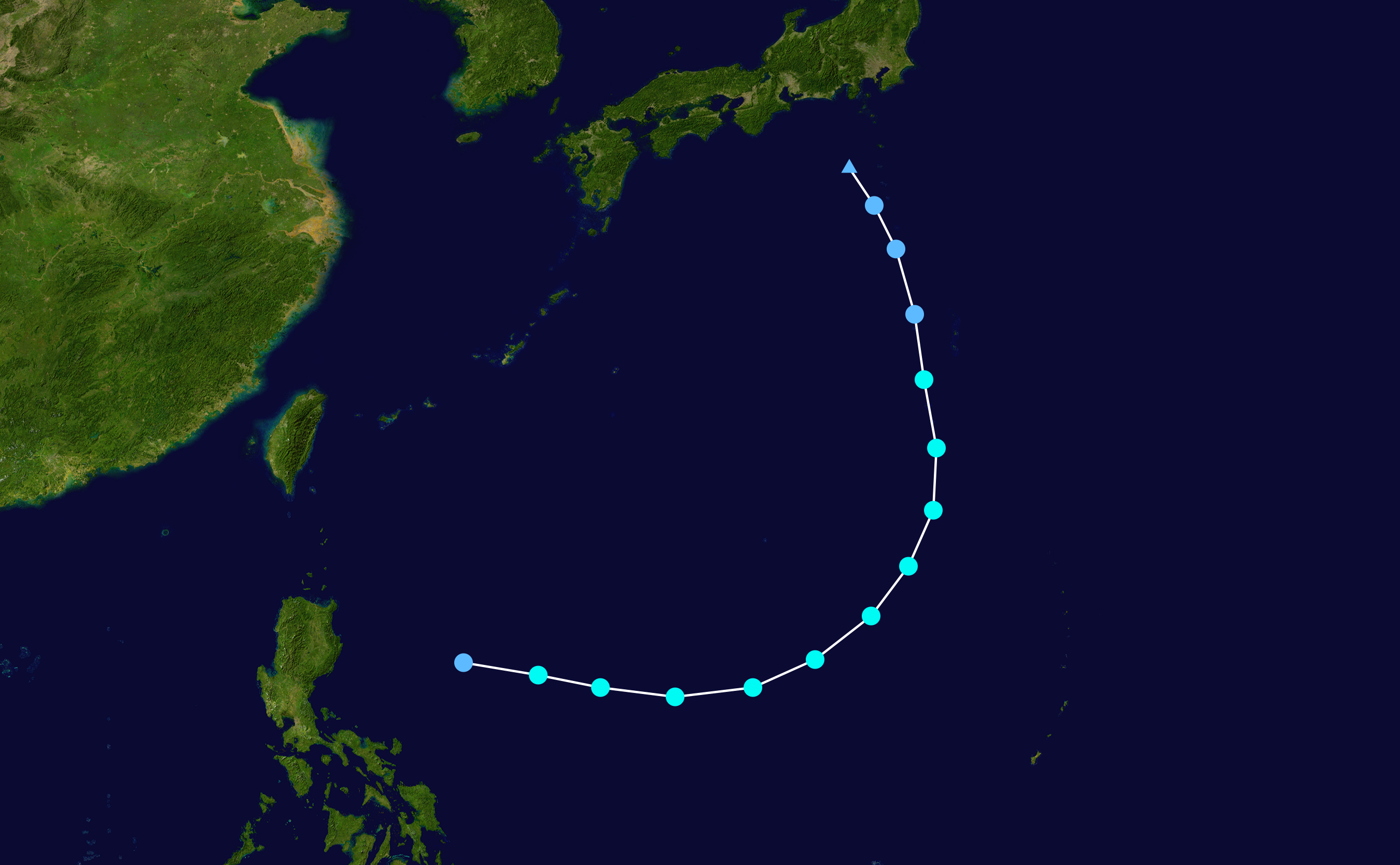
- Duration: August 15 – August 18
- Peak intensity: 95 km/h (60 mph) (1-min); 980 hPa (mbar)

Nadine did not make landfall.

=== Tropical Depression 20W ===
- Tropical depression (JMA)
- Tropical depression (SSHWS)
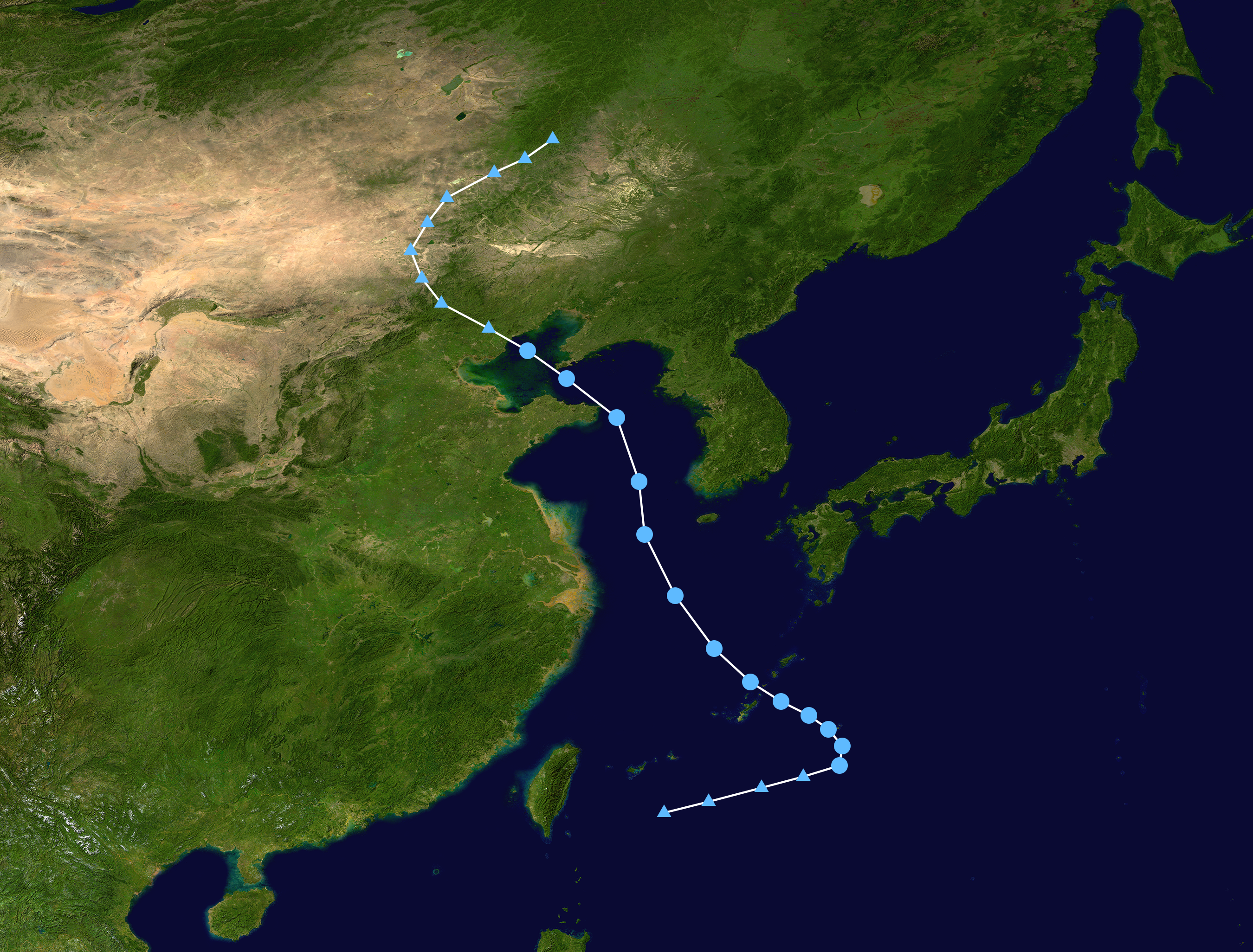
- Duration: August 26 – August 29
- Peak intensity: 55 km/h (35 mph) (1-min); 994 hPa (mbar)

20W hit China.

=== Severe Tropical Storm Rose (Oyang) ===
- Severe tropical storm (JMA)
- Tropical storm (SSHWS)
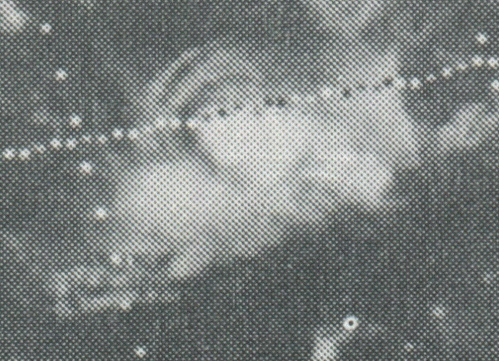
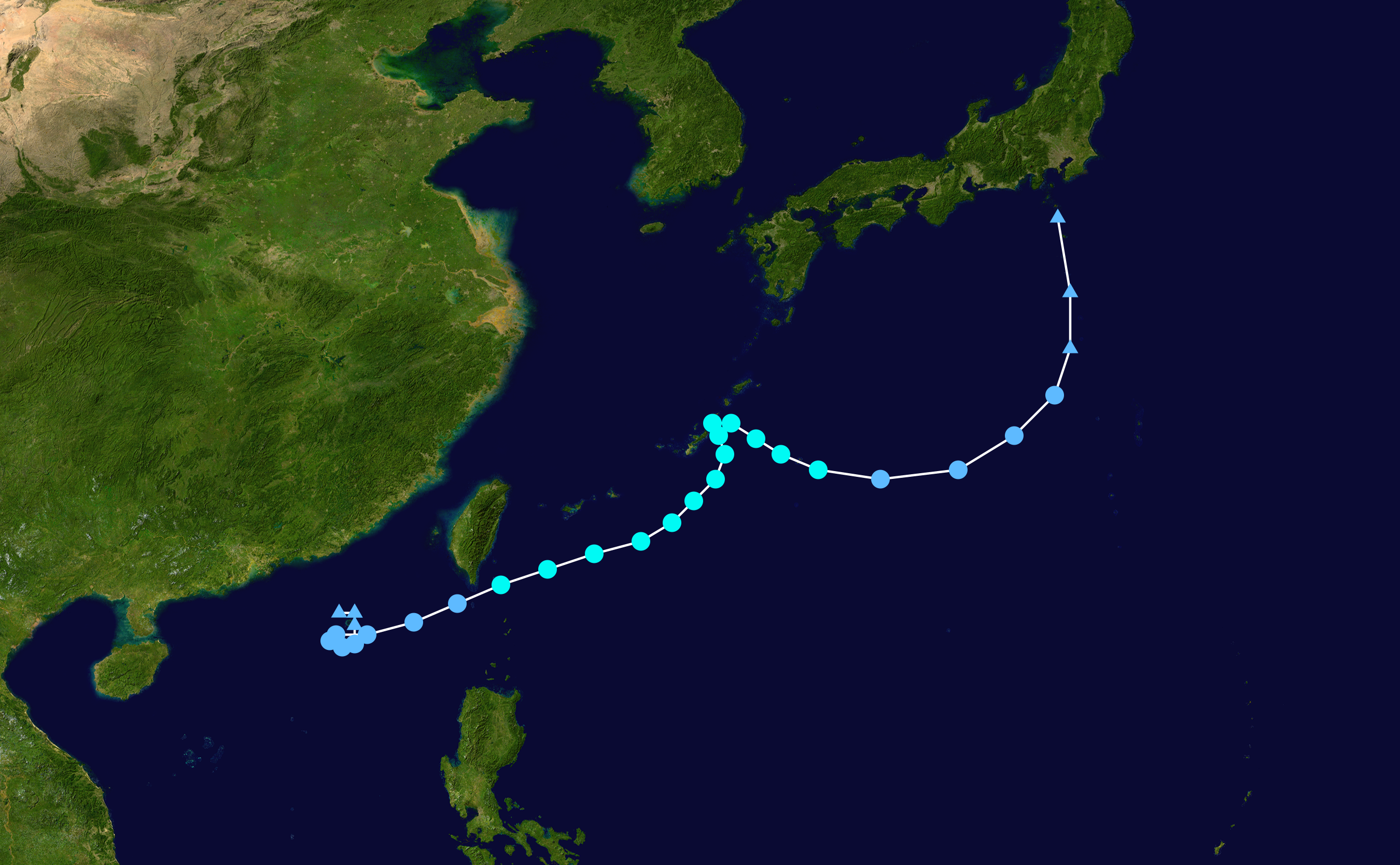
- Duration: August 24 – September 1
- Peak intensity: 95 km/h (60 mph) (1-min); 985 hPa (mbar)

Rose did not strike land.

=== Typhoon Polly ===
- Typhoon (JMA)
- Category 2-equivalent typhoon (SSHWS)
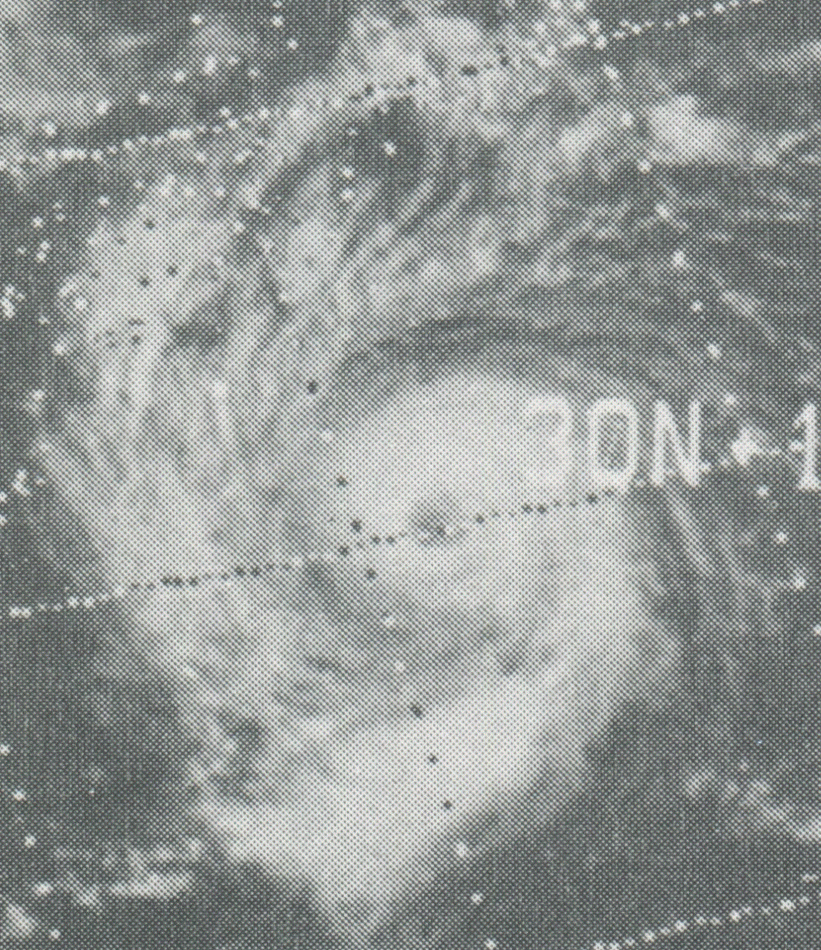
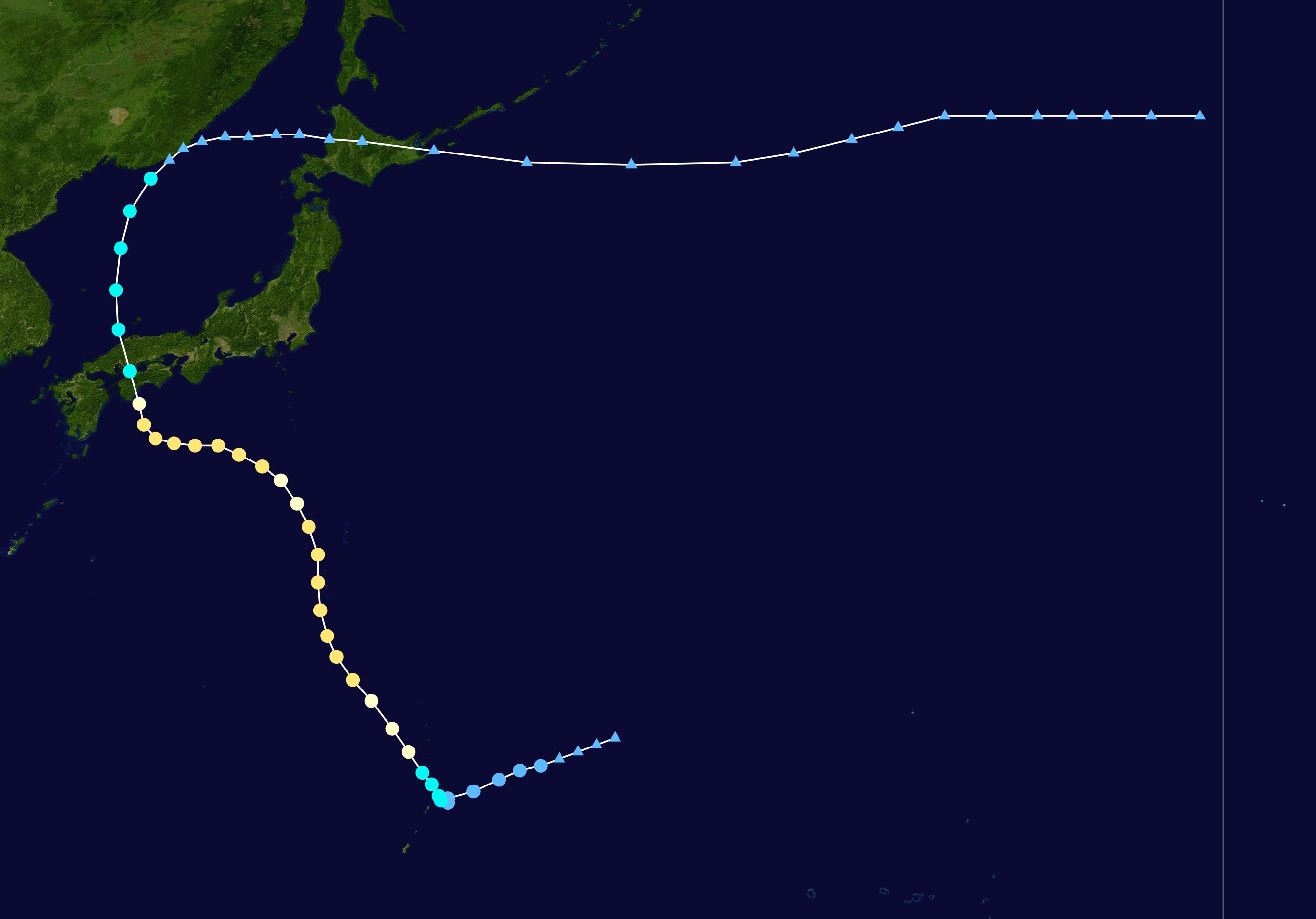
- Duration: August 25 – September 5
- Peak intensity: 175 km/h (110 mph) (1-min); 950 hPa (mbar)

Polly hit Japan.

=== Typhoon Shirley (Pasing) ===
- Typhoon (JMA)
- Category 1-equivalent typhoon (SSHWS)
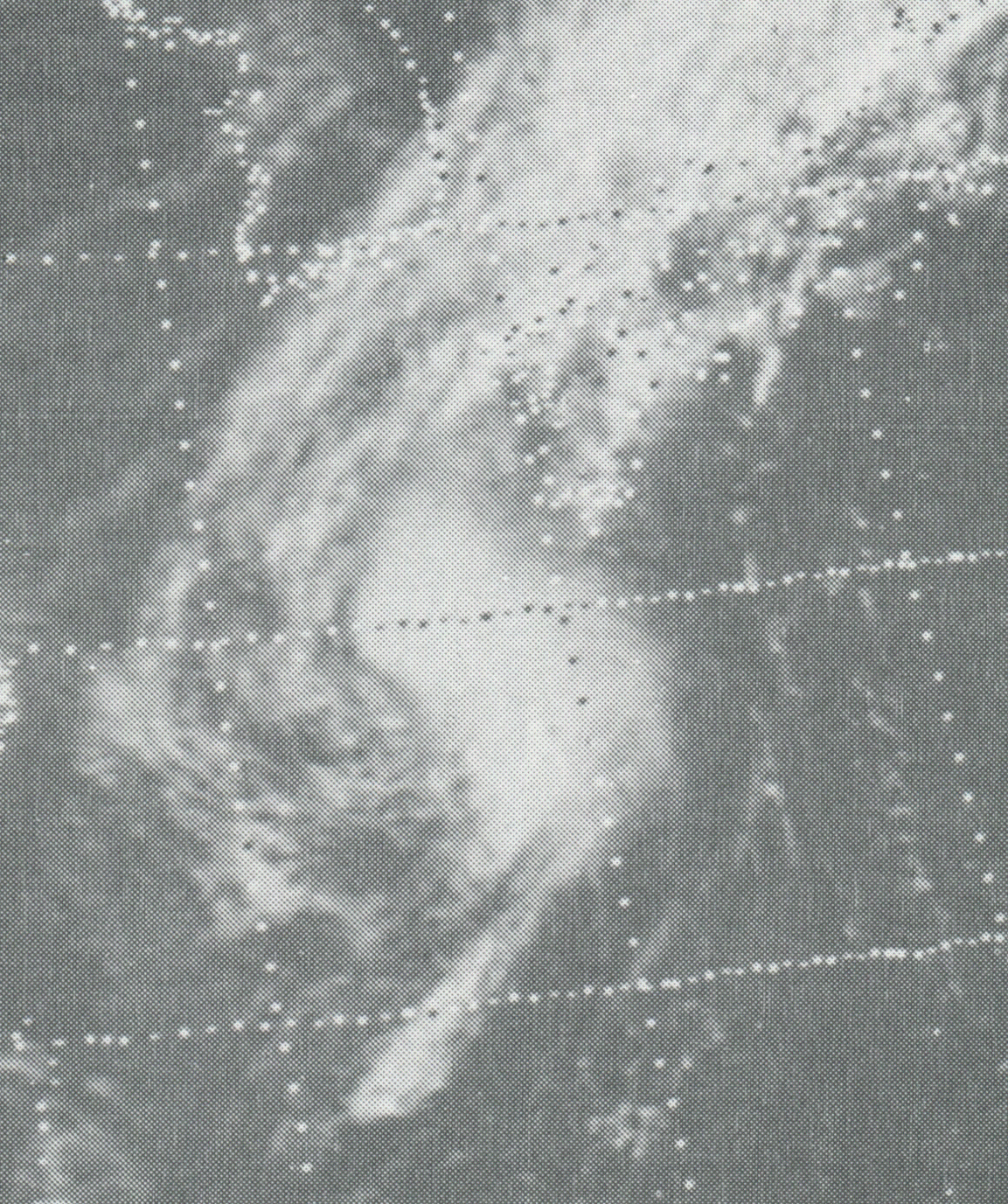
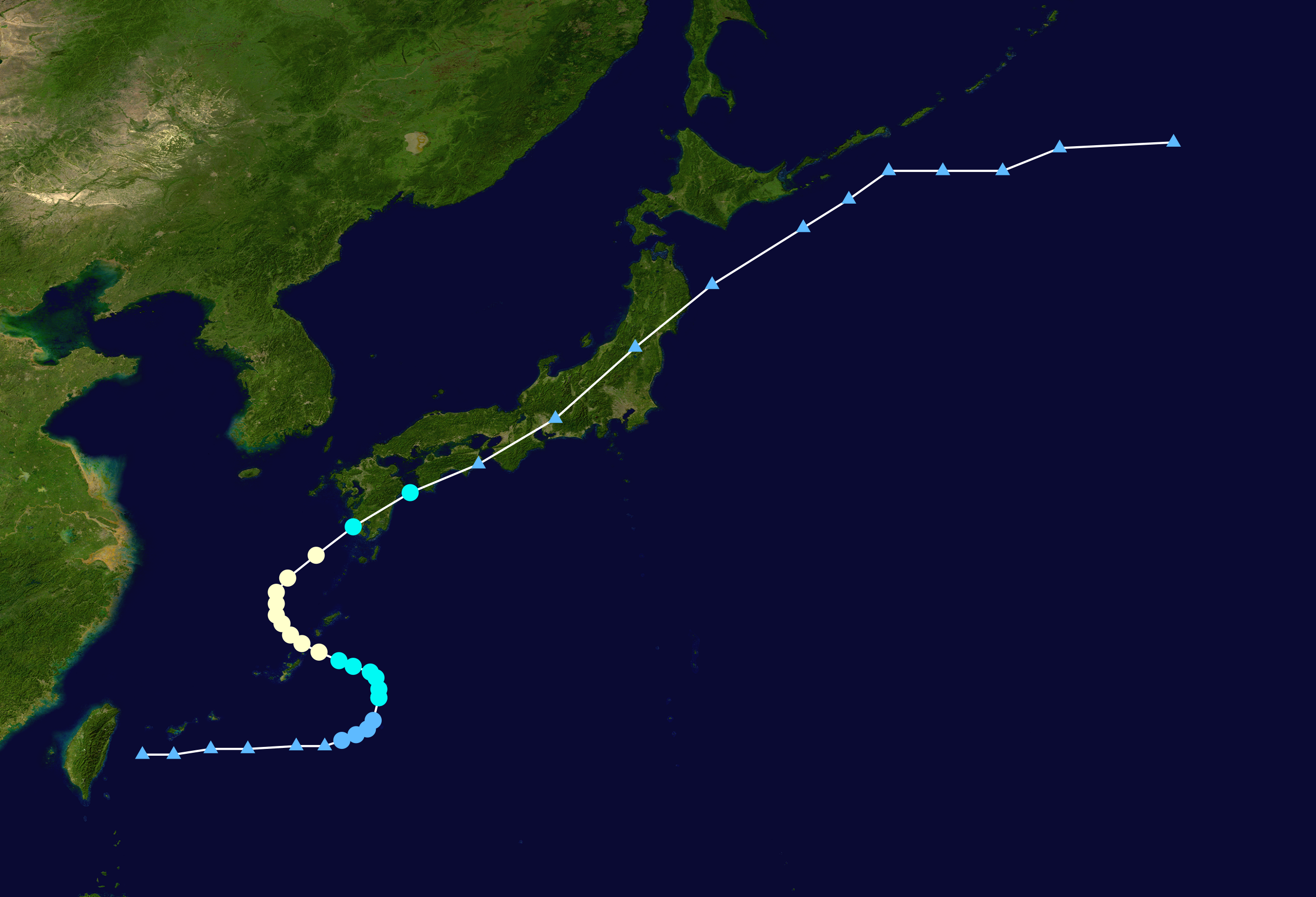
- Duration: September 2 – September 11
- Peak intensity: 140 km/h (85 mph) (1-min); 970 hPa (mbar)

Shirley was a minimal typhoon.

=== Tropical Storm Trix ===
- Tropical storm (JMA)
- Tropical storm (SSHWS)
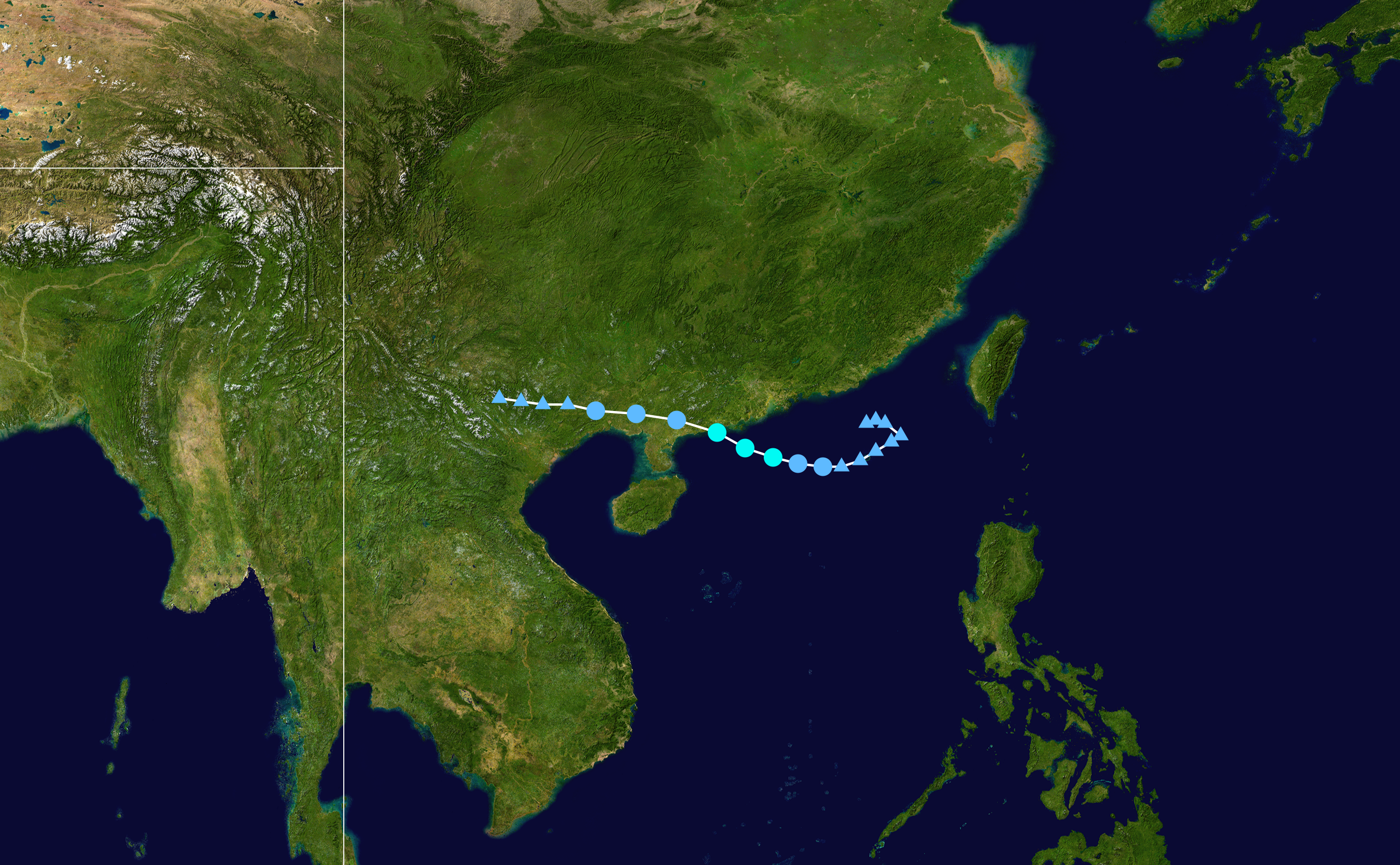
- Duration: September 4 – September 8
- Peak intensity: 75 km/h (45 mph) (1-min); 990 hPa (mbar)

Trix hit China.

=== Typhoon Virginia ===
- Typhoon (JMA)
- Category 1-equivalent typhoon (SSHWS)
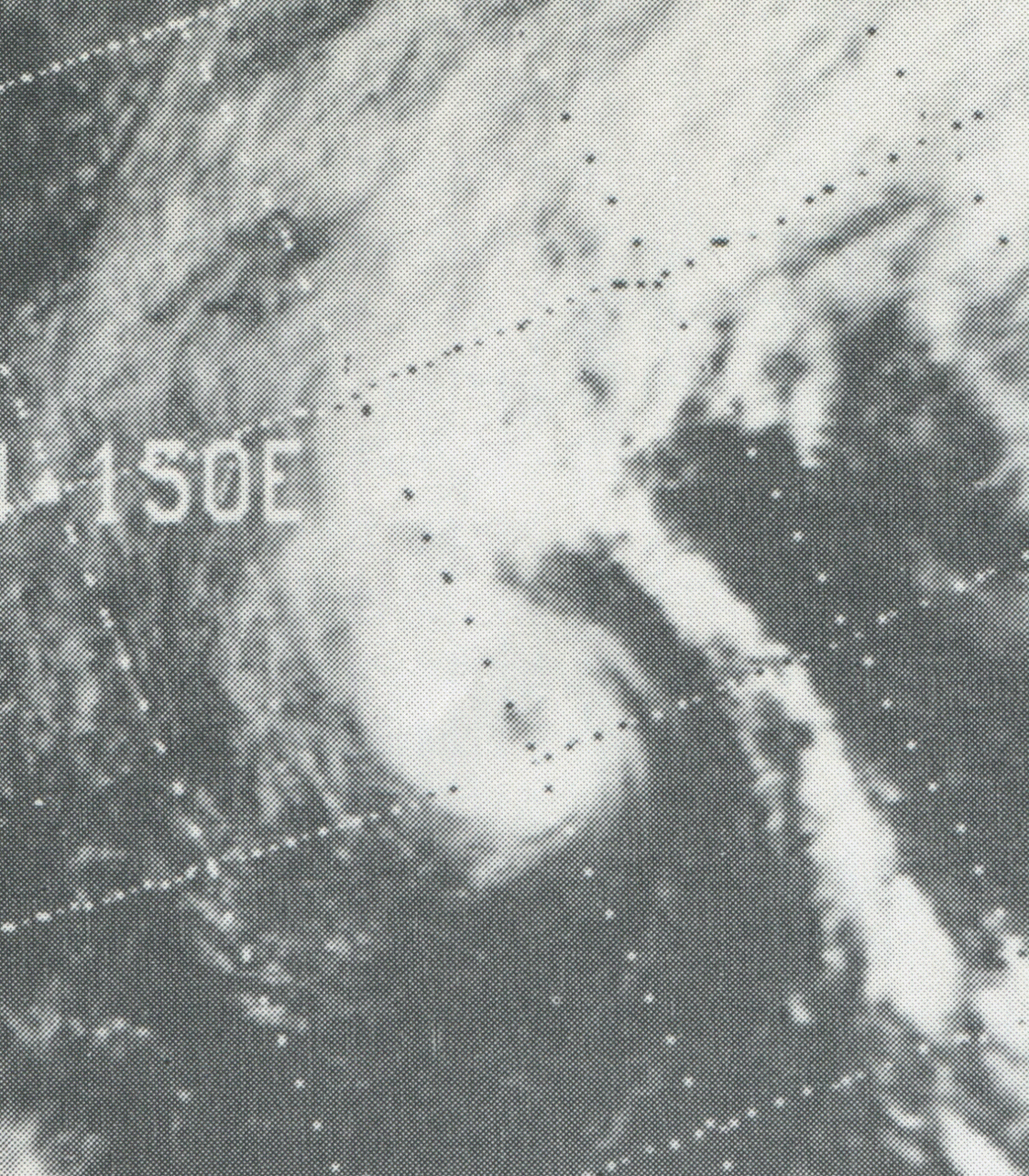
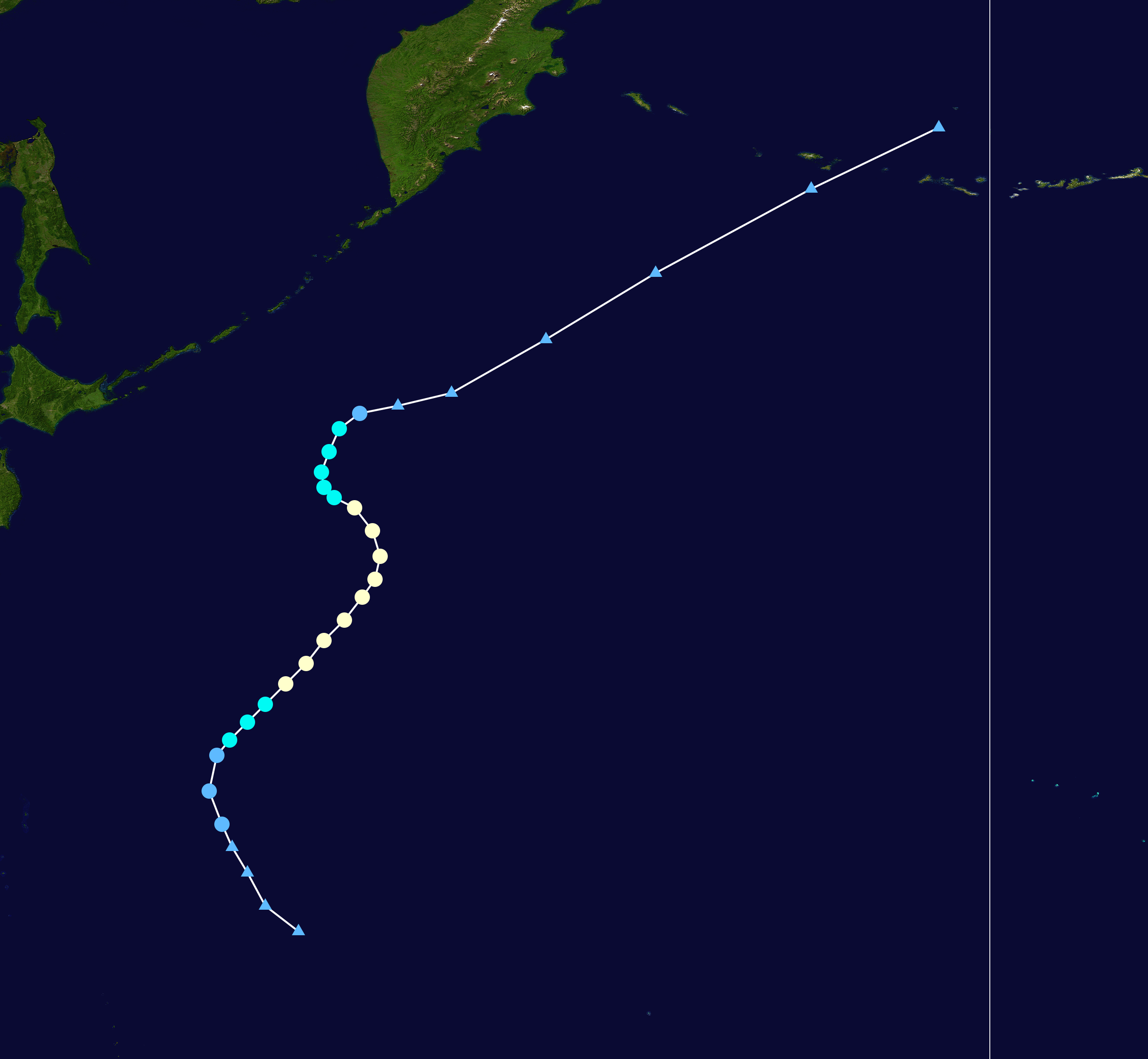
- Duration: September 10 – September 16
- Peak intensity: 140 km/h (85 mph) (1-min); 970 hPa (mbar)

Virginia did not hit land.

=== Severe Tropical Storm Wendy (Ruping) ===
- Severe tropical storm (JMA)
- Tropical storm (SSHWS)
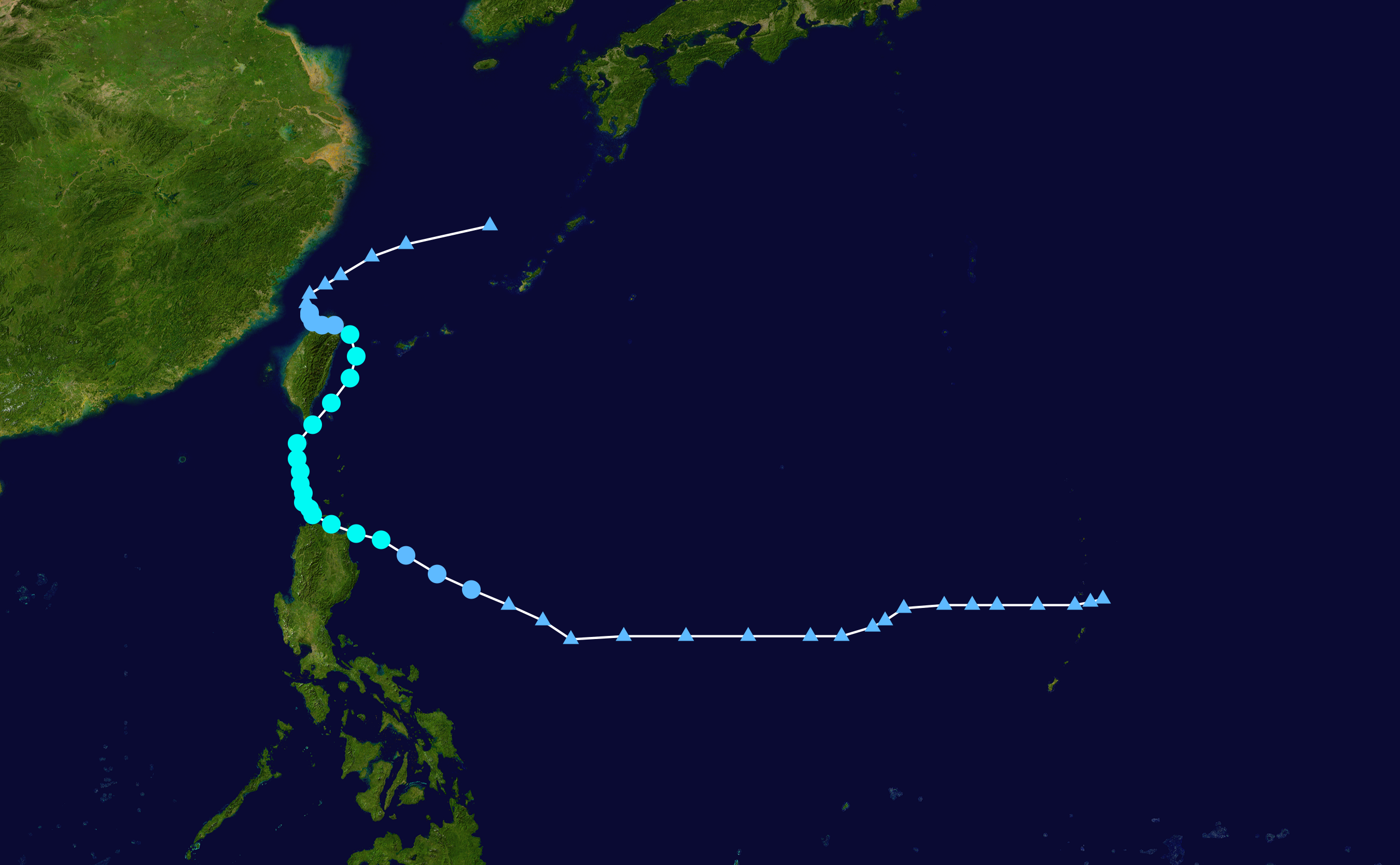
- Duration: September 19 – October 2
- Peak intensity: 110 km/h (70 mph) (1-min); 985 hPa (mbar)

Wendy came near Taiwan and the Philippines.

=== Typhoon Agnes ===
- Typhoon (JMA)
- Category 3-equivalent typhoon (SSHWS)
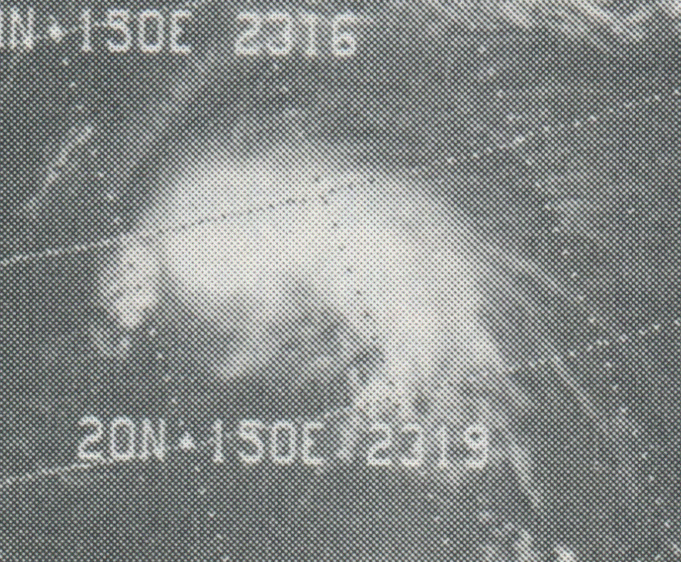
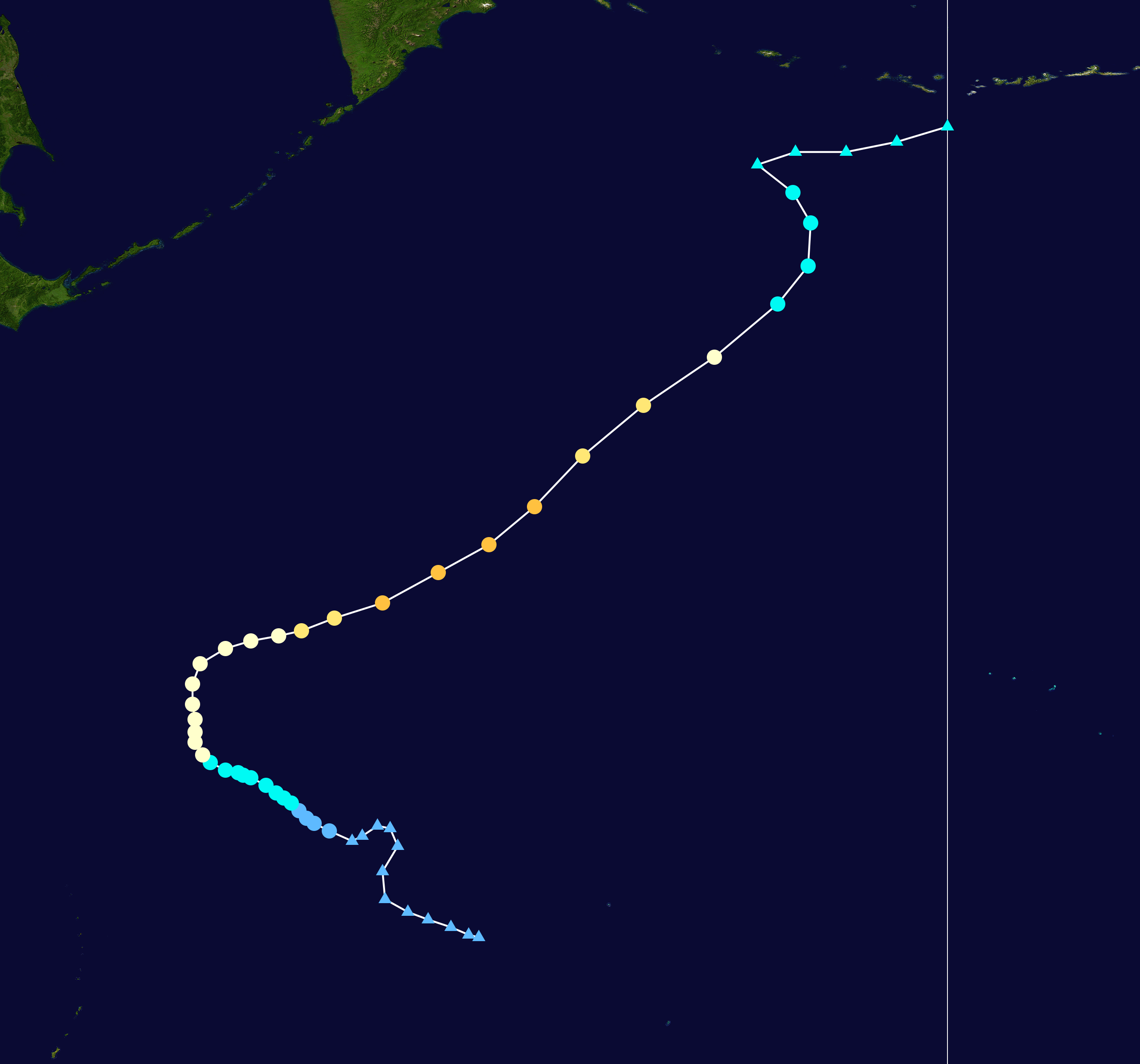
- Duration: September 21 – October 3
- Peak intensity: 195 km/h (120 mph) (1-min); 960 hPa (mbar)

Agnes stayed away from land.

=== Typhoon Bess (Susang) ===
- Typhoon (JMA)
- Category 1-equivalent typhoon (SSHWS)
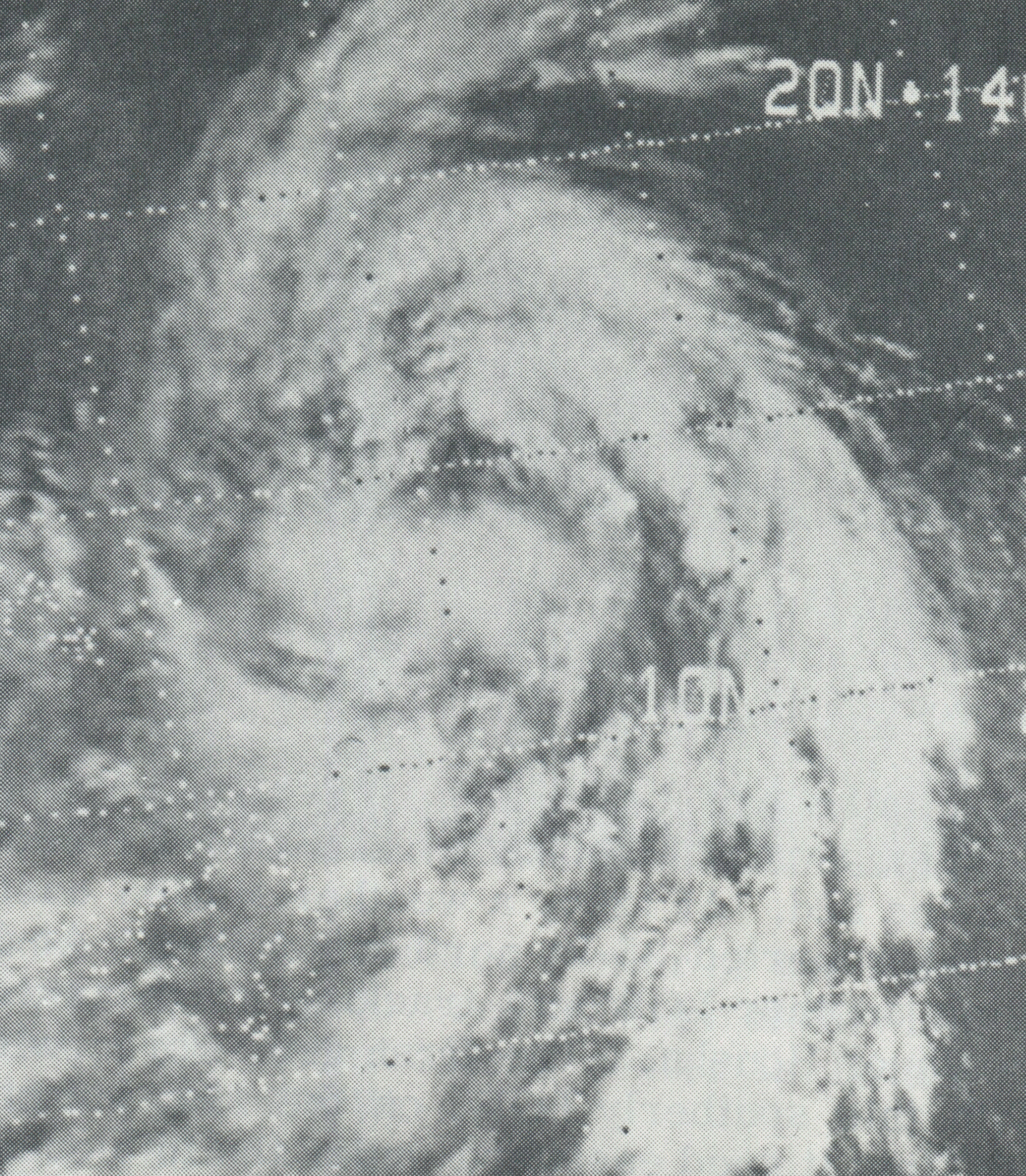
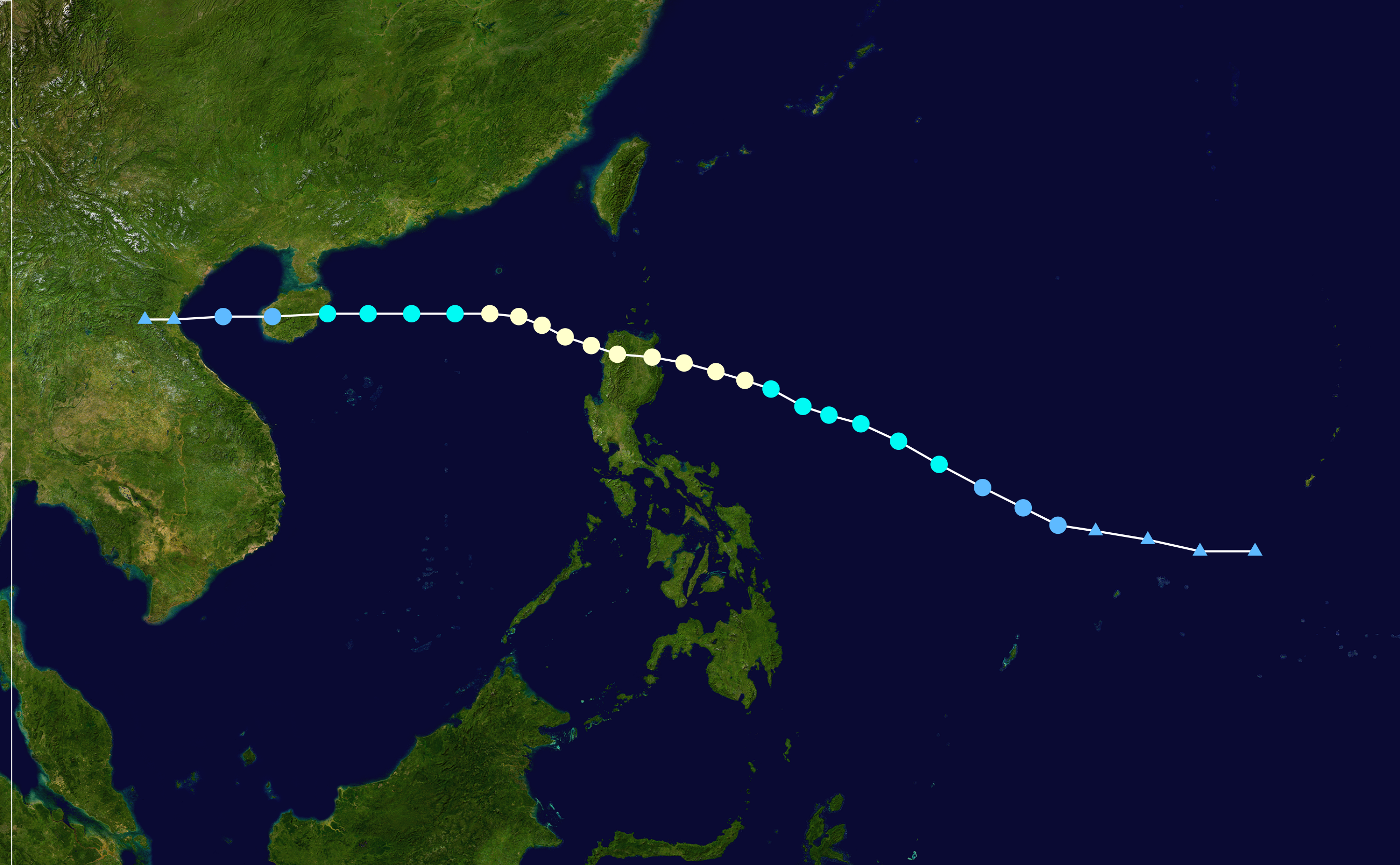
- Duration: October 7 – October 14
- Peak intensity: 120 km/h (75 mph) (1-min); 975 hPa (mbar)

Typhoon Bess crossed northern Luzon on October 10, crossed the South China Sea, and hit Hainan Island on the 13th. Bess continued westward, and dissipated over North Vietnam on the 14th. The storm dumped heavy rains on its path, causing 26 deaths (with 3 missing) and $9.2 million (1974 USD) in damage. The name Bess was retired after this season.

=== Typhoon Carmen (Tering) ===
- Typhoon (JMA)
- Category 1-equivalent typhoon (SSHWS)
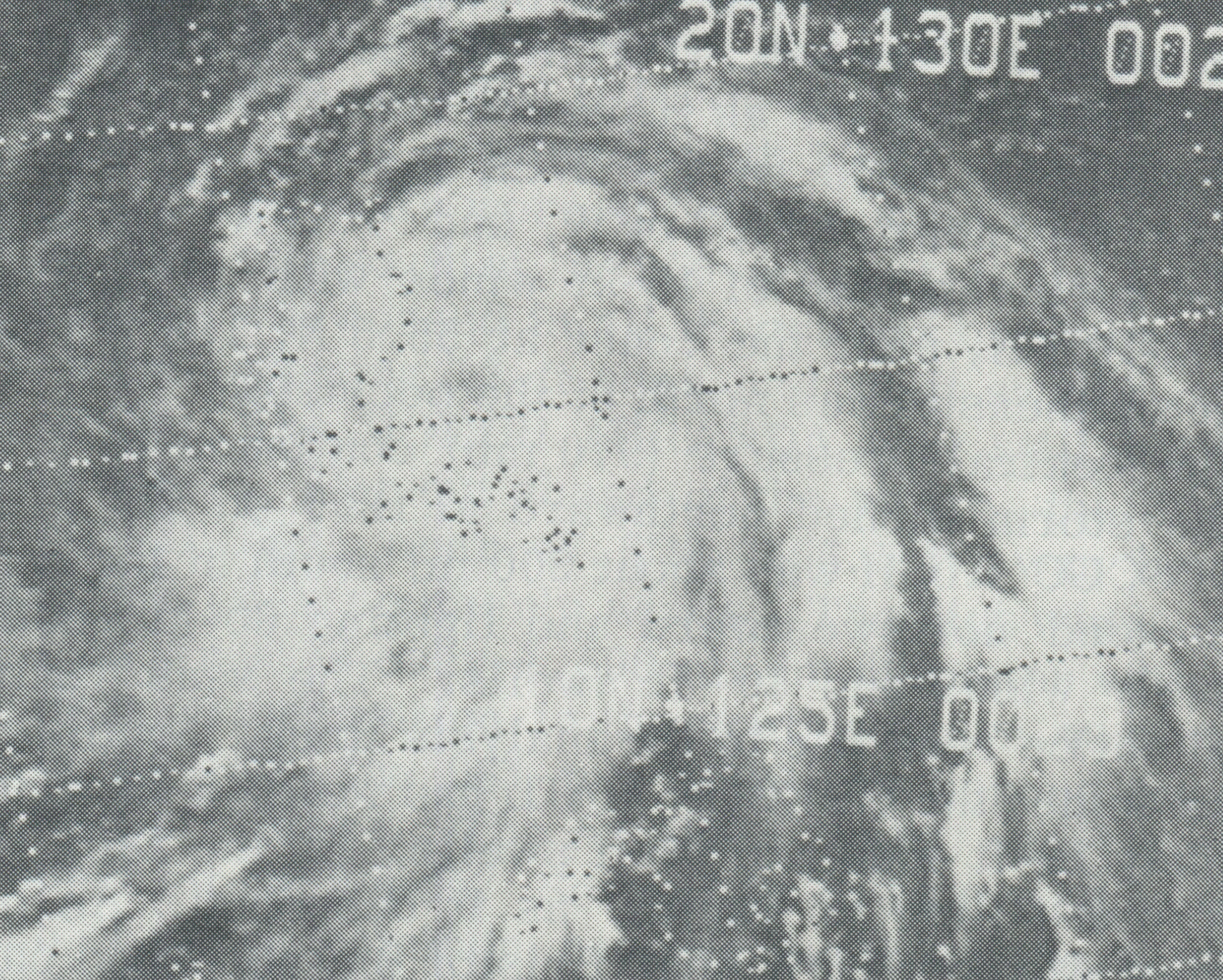
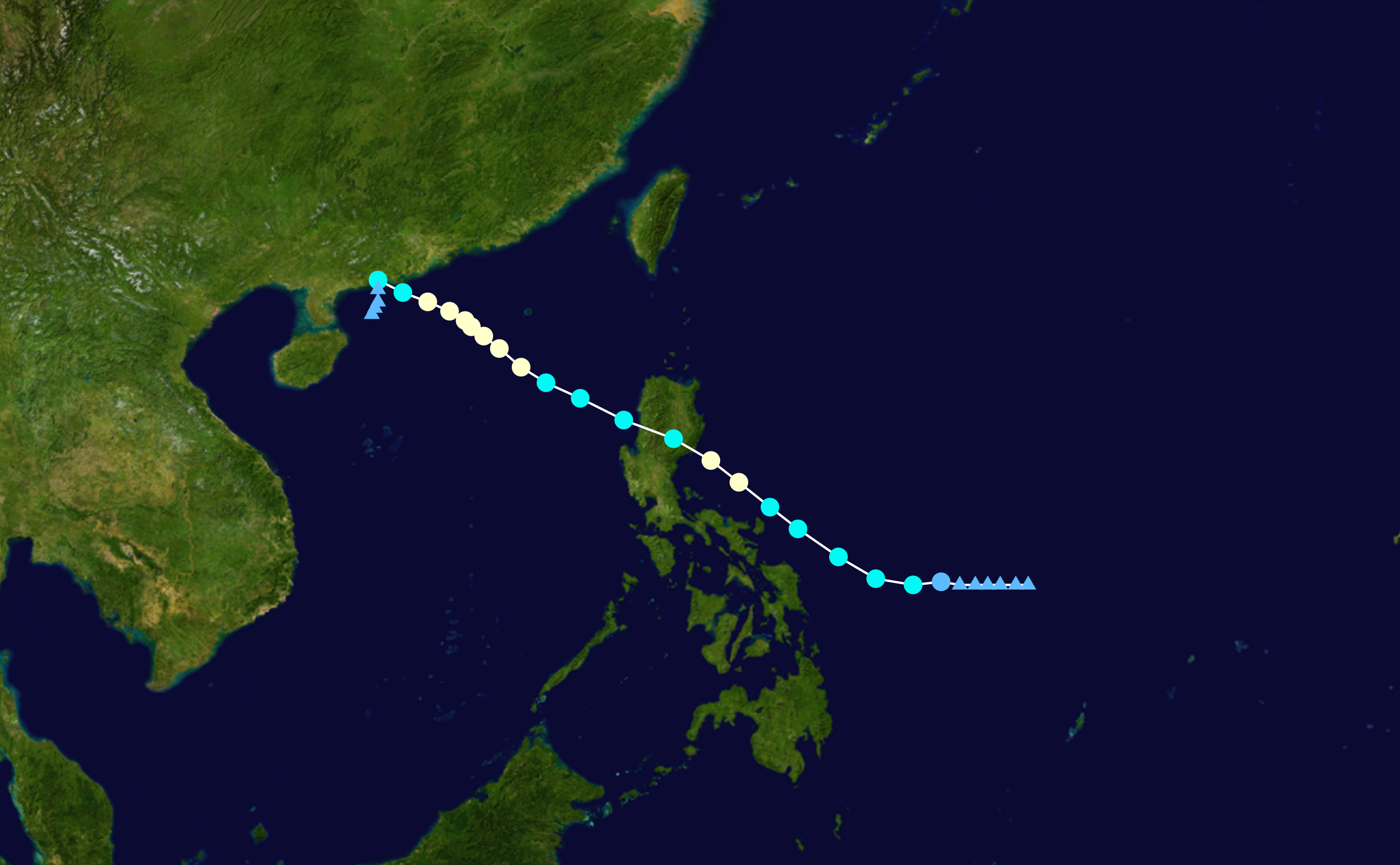
- Duration: October 12 – October 20
- Peak intensity: 140 km/h (85 mph) (1-min); 975 hPa (mbar)

Typhoon Carmen hit Luzon on October 16, just days after Bess hit. It continued northwestward, made landfall on southeastern China, turned south, and dissipated on the 20th. Typhoon Carmen caused sustained storm force winds in Hong Kong and 25 fatalities, with damage estimated at $13 million (1974 USD).

=== Typhoon Della (Uding) ===
- Typhoon (JMA)
- Category 2-equivalent typhoon (SSHWS)
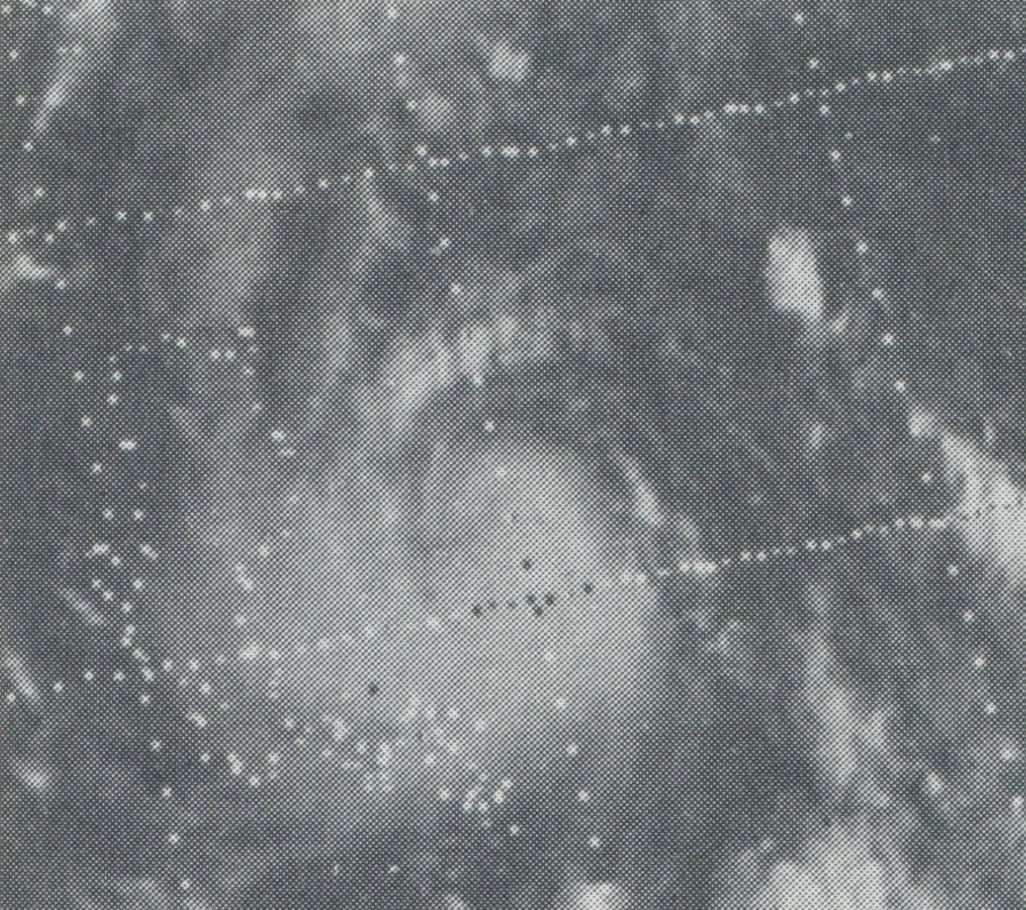
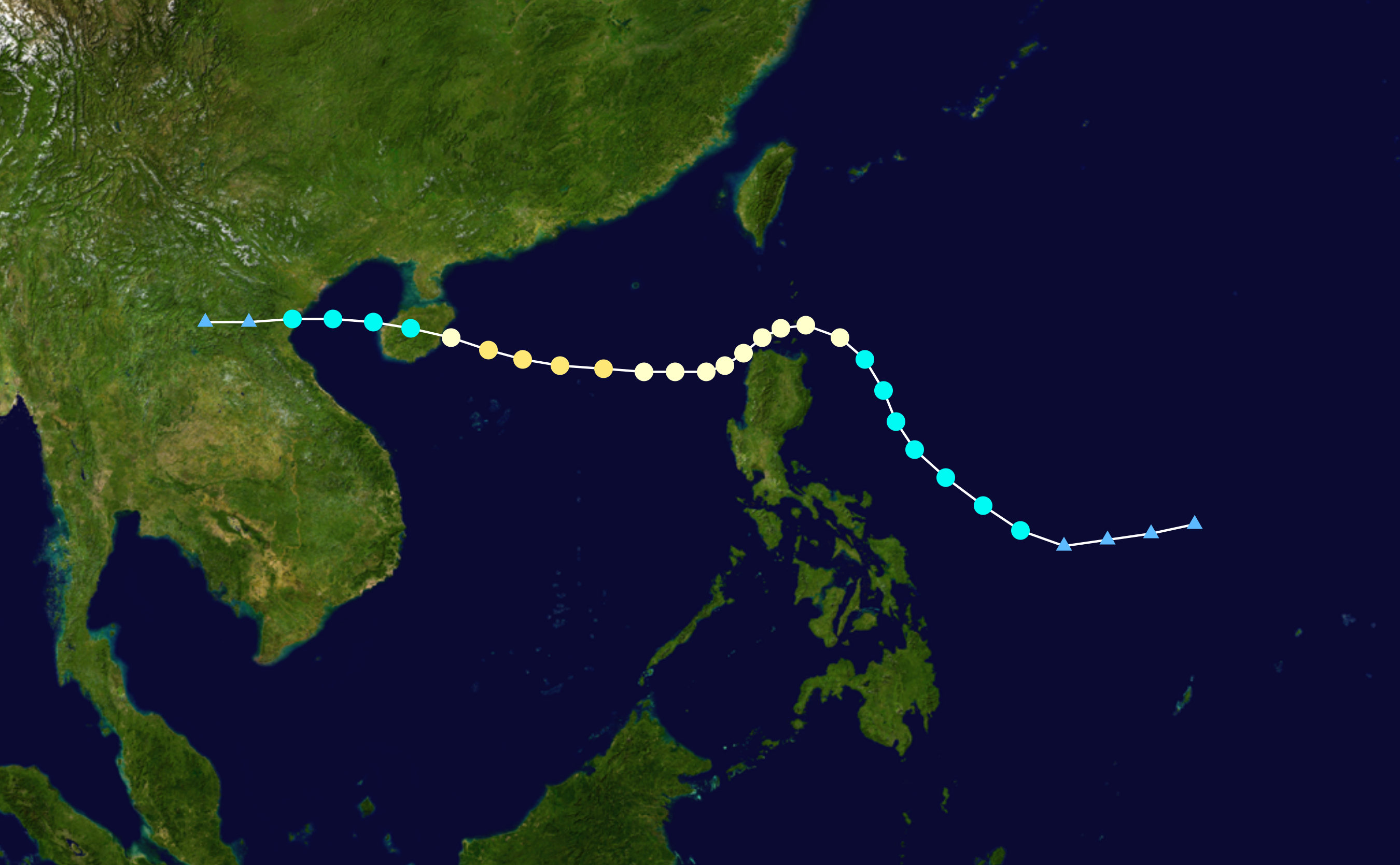
- Duration: October 18 – October 27
- Peak intensity: 165 km/h (105 mph) (1-min); 960 hPa (mbar)

Della passed near the Philippines and later struck Hainan.

=== Typhoon Elaine (Wening) ===
- Typhoon (JMA)
- Category 2-equivalent typhoon (SSHWS)
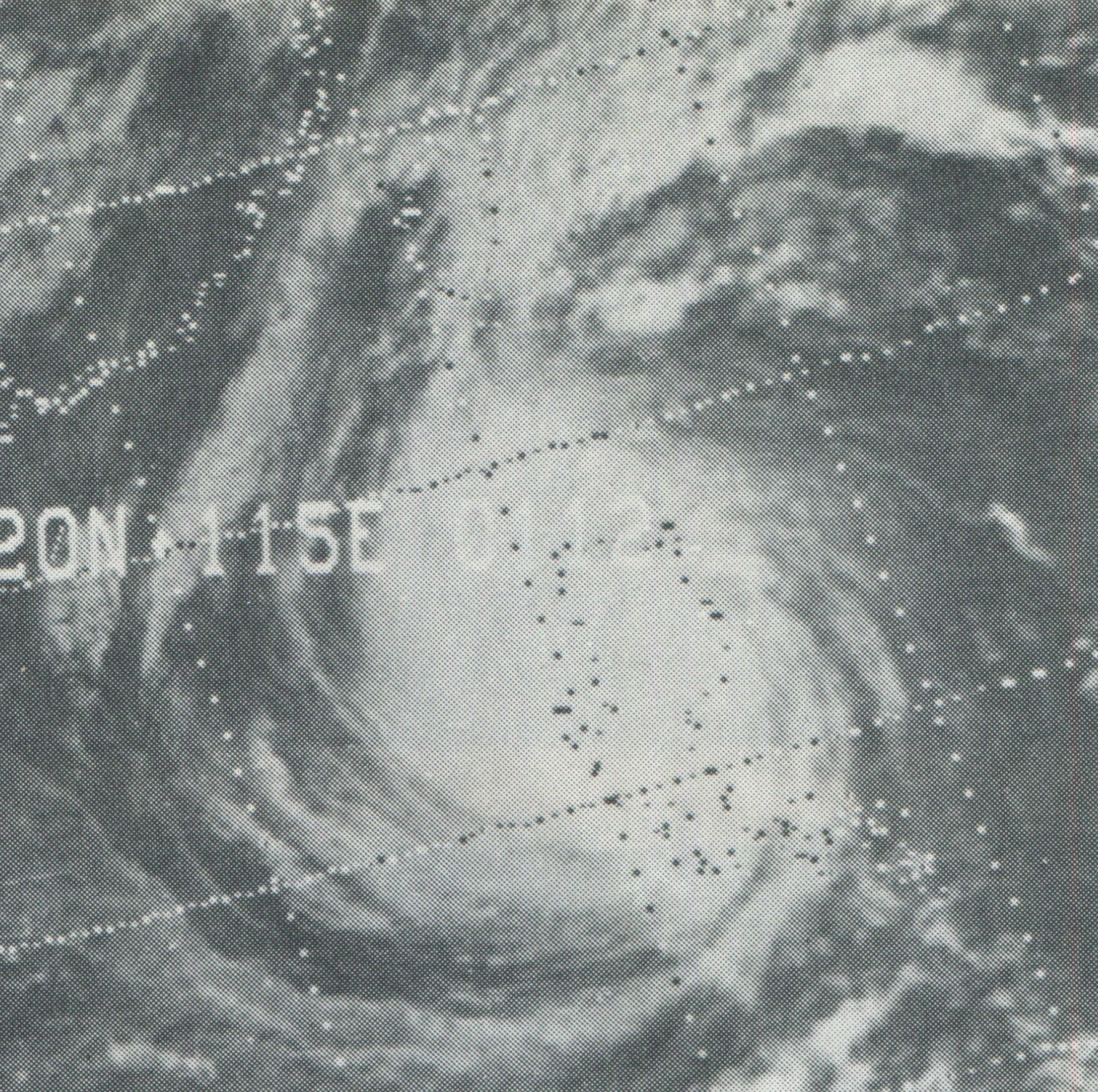
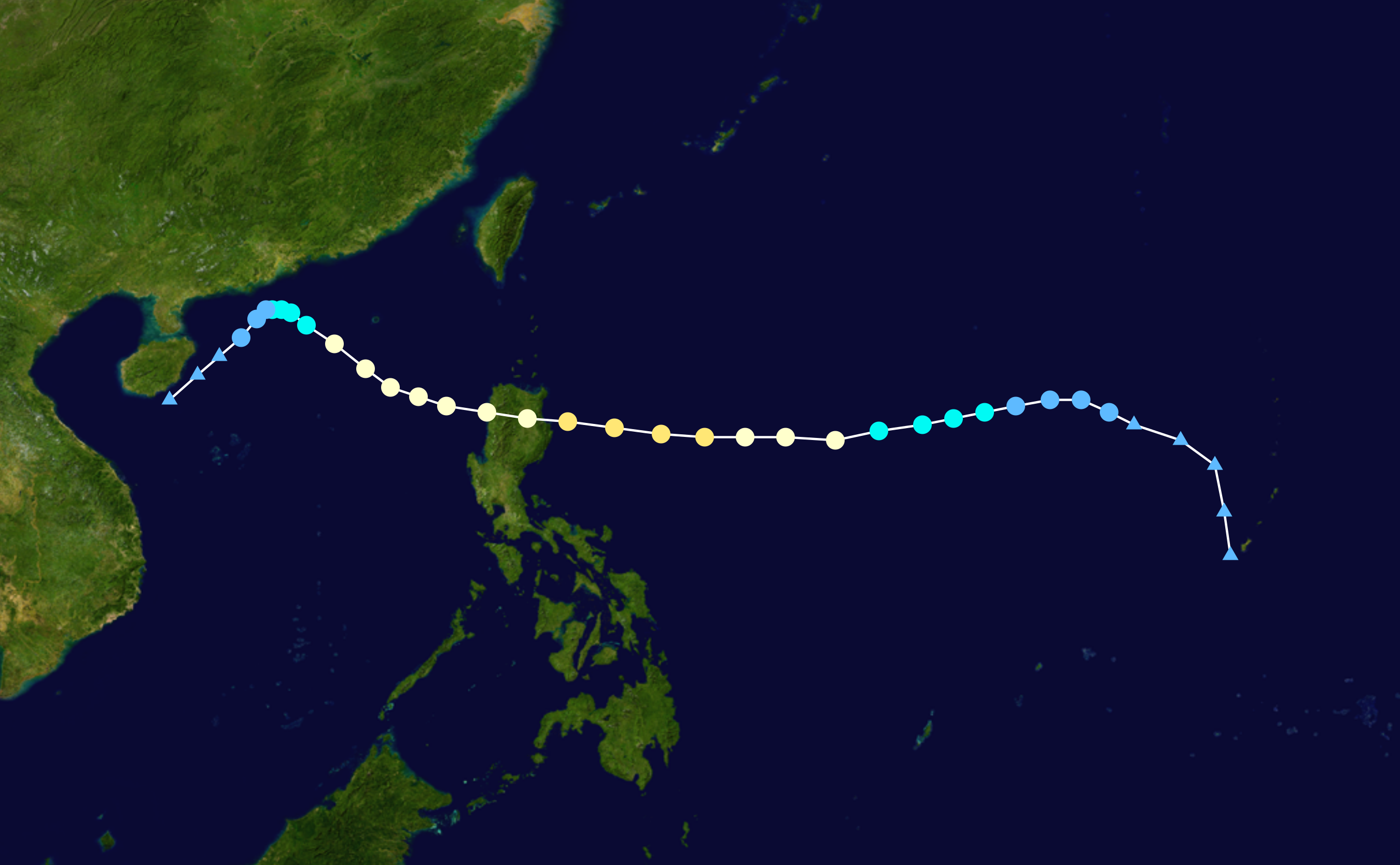
- Duration: October 22 – October 31
- Peak intensity: 175 km/h (110 mph) (1-min); 940 hPa (mbar)

23 casualties and $21 million in damage can be attributed to 110 mph Typhoon Elaine hitting northern Luzon on October 27.

=== Severe Tropical Storm Faye (Yaning) ===
- Severe tropical storm (JMA)
- Tropical storm (SSHWS)
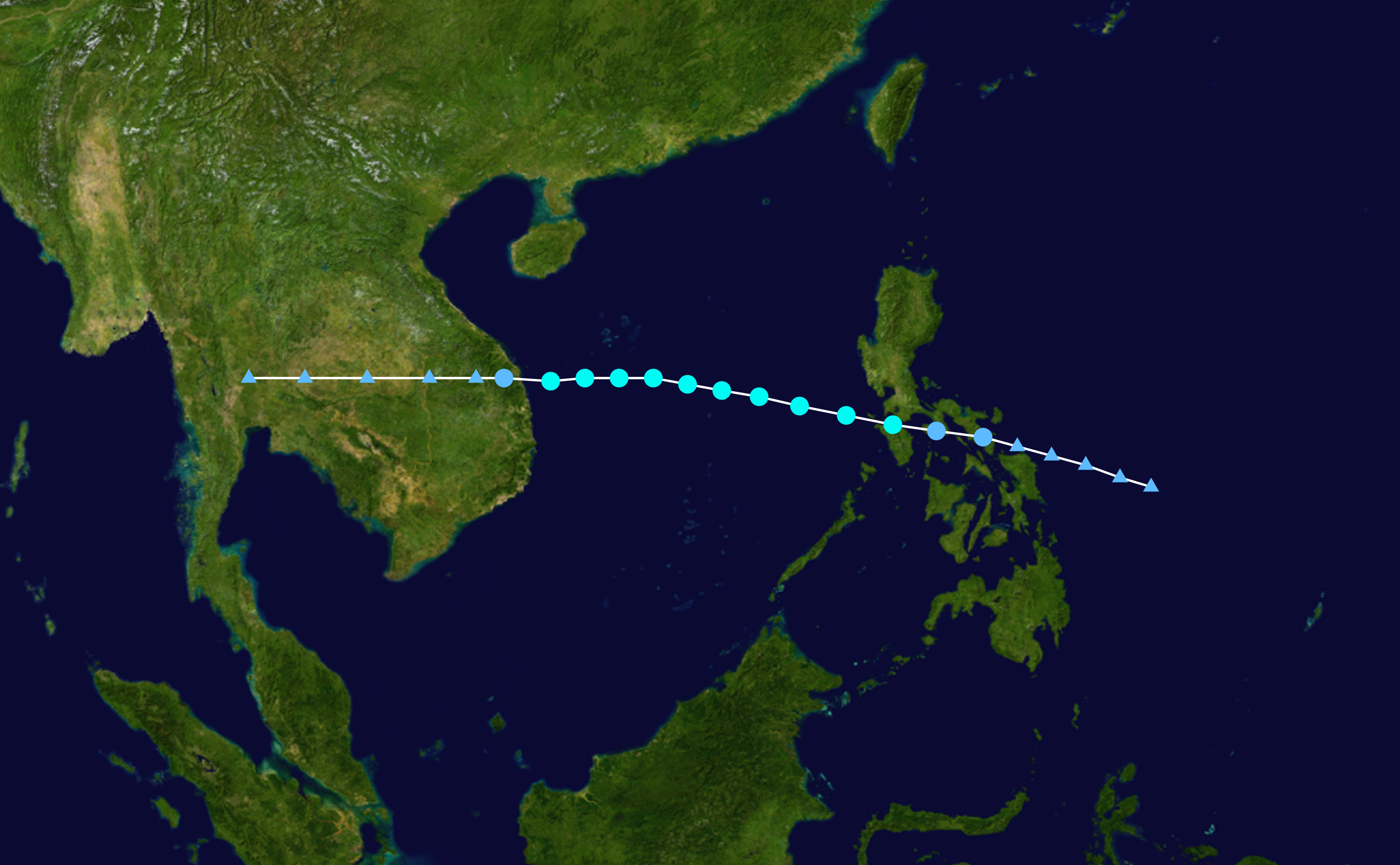
- Duration: October 30 – November 5
- Peak intensity: 100 km/h (65 mph) (1-min); 985 hPa (mbar)

Faye hit the Philippines and Thailand.

=== Typhoon Gloria (Aning) ===
- Typhoon (JMA)
- Category 4-equivalent typhoon (SSHWS)
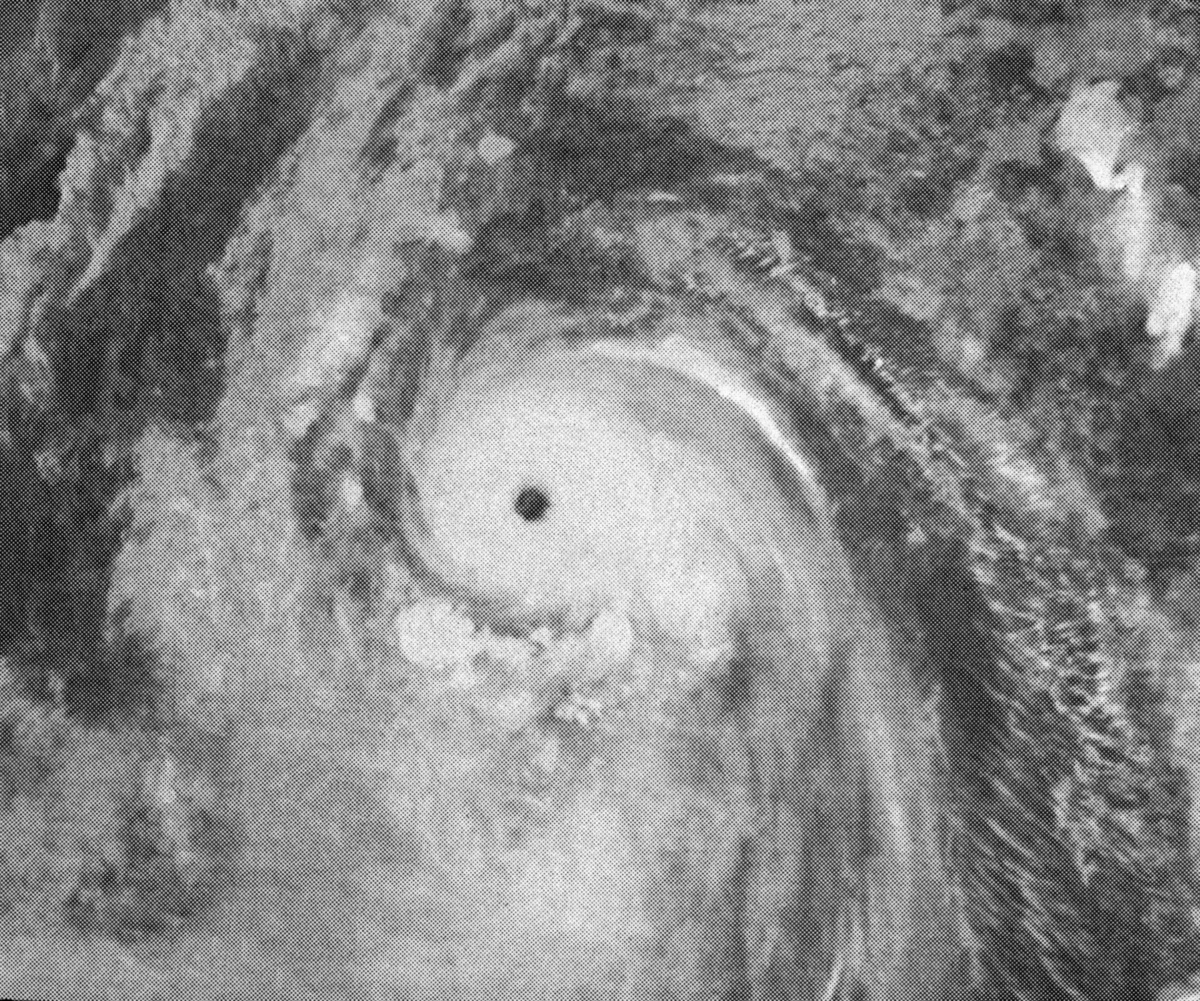
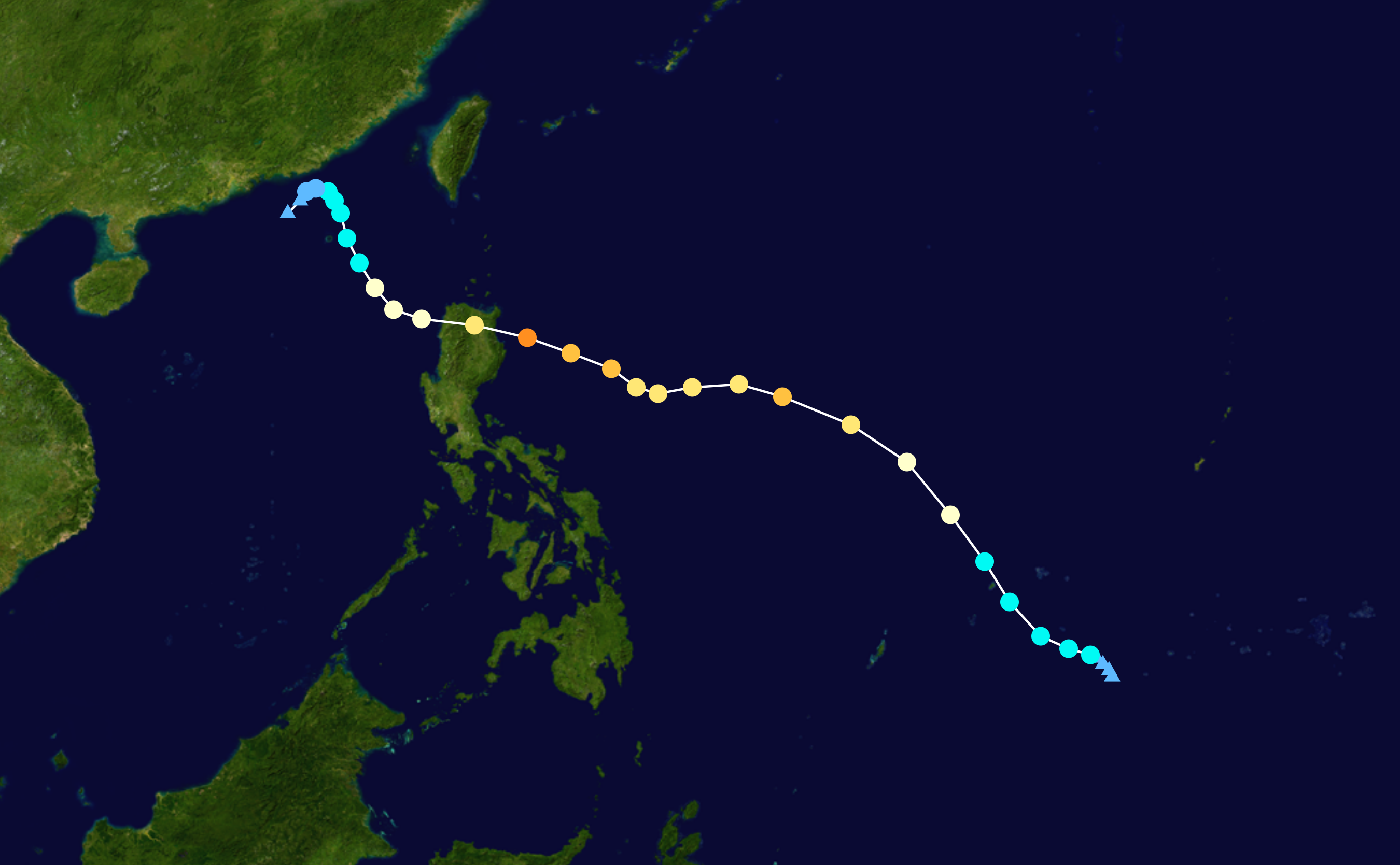
- Duration: November 2 – November 11
- Peak intensity: 220 km/h (140 mph) (1-min); 930 hPa (mbar)

Glorida moved onshore the Philippines and hit as a typhoon.

=== Tropical Storm Hester ===
- Tropical storm (JMA)
- Tropical storm (SSHWS)
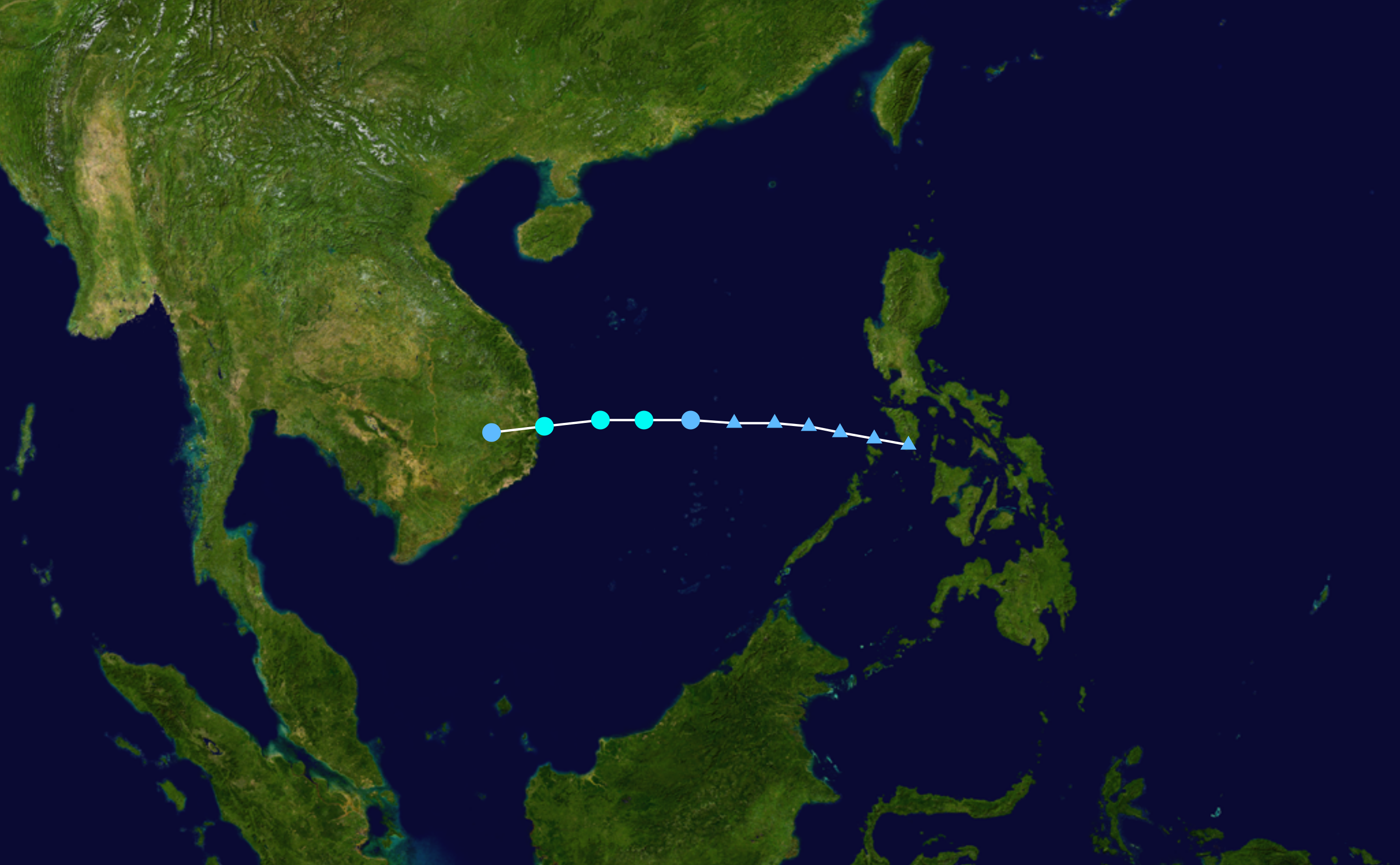
- Duration: November 12 – November 15
- Peak intensity: 65 km/h (40 mph) (1-min); 1000 hPa (mbar)

Hester formed in the South China Sea.

=== Typhoon Irma (Bidang) ===
- Typhoon (JMA)
- Category 4-equivalent typhoon (SSHWS)
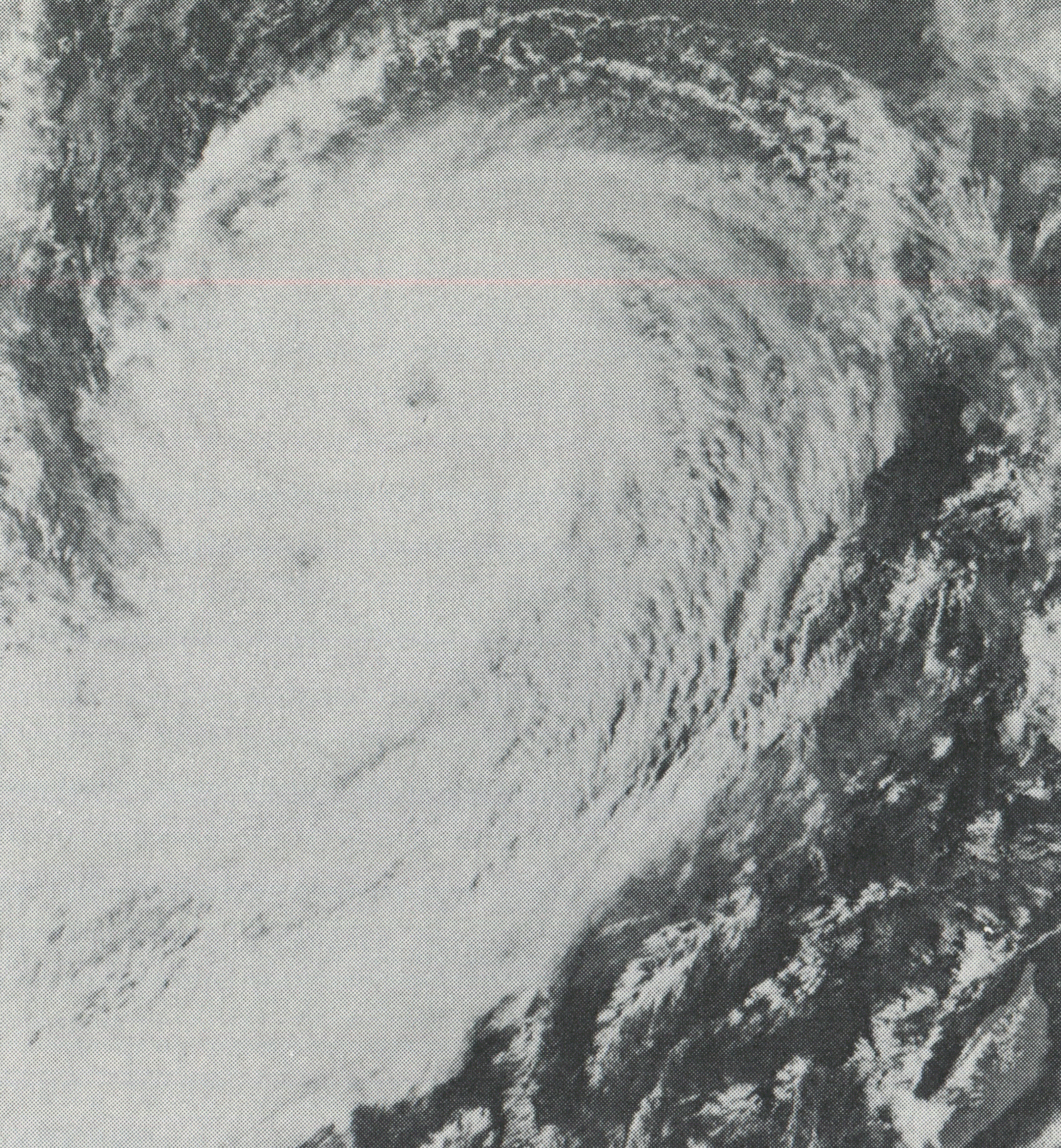
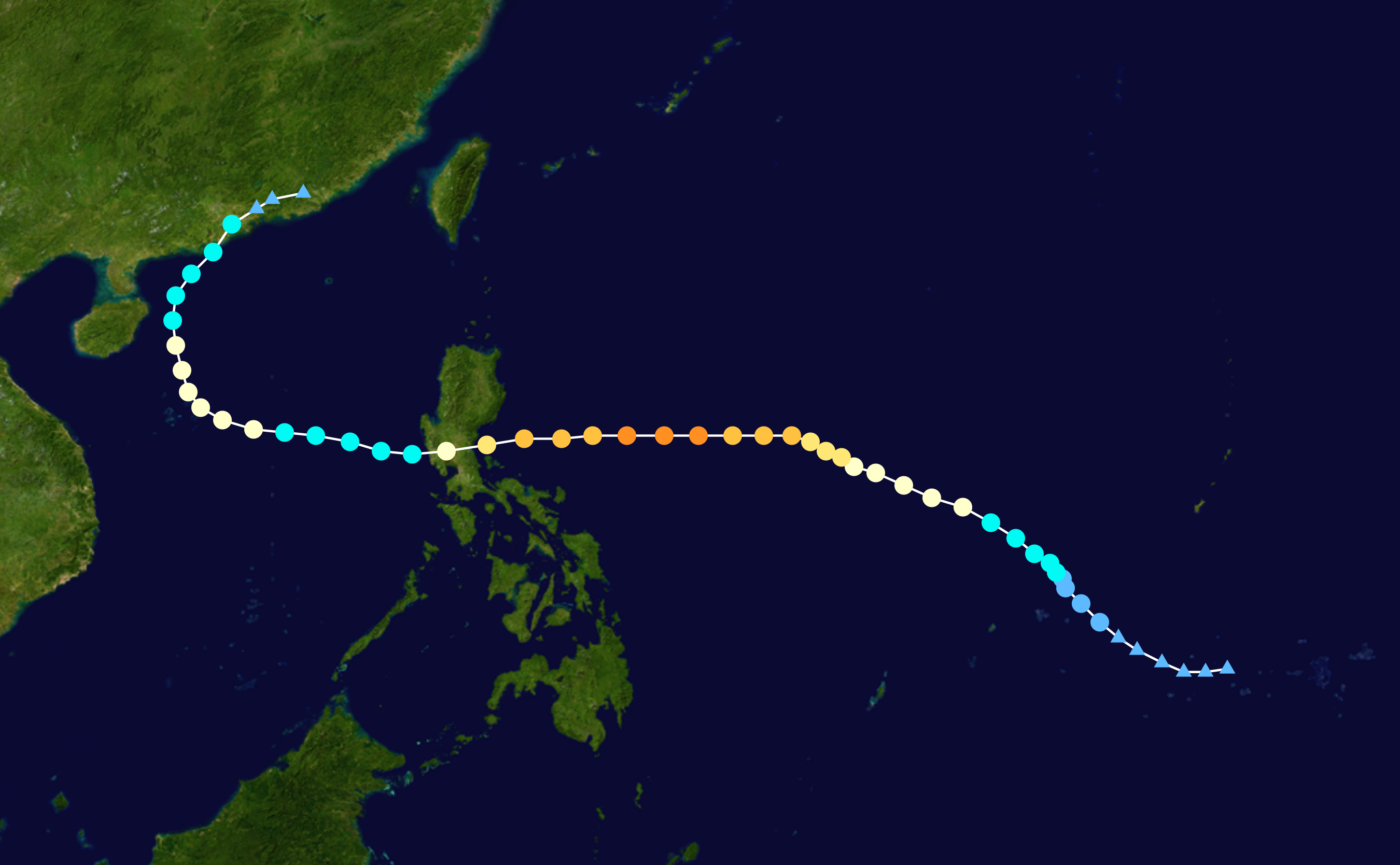
- Duration: November 21 – December 3
- Peak intensity: 215 km/h (130 mph) (1-min); 940 hPa (mbar)

The last of the year's 8 typhoons to hit the Philippines made landfall on November 28 as a 100 mph typhoon. Irma, once a 130 mph typhoon, weakened over the islands and restrengthened into a typhoon in the South China Sea. It turned northward, and hit southern China as a weakening tropical storm on December 2, the latest date for a Chinese tropical storm landfall. Irma killed 11 people, and caused $7.3 million in damage see also the similar track of typhoon Irma in 1981.

=== Tropical Storm Judy (Kading) ===
- Tropical storm (JMA)
- Tropical storm (SSHWS)
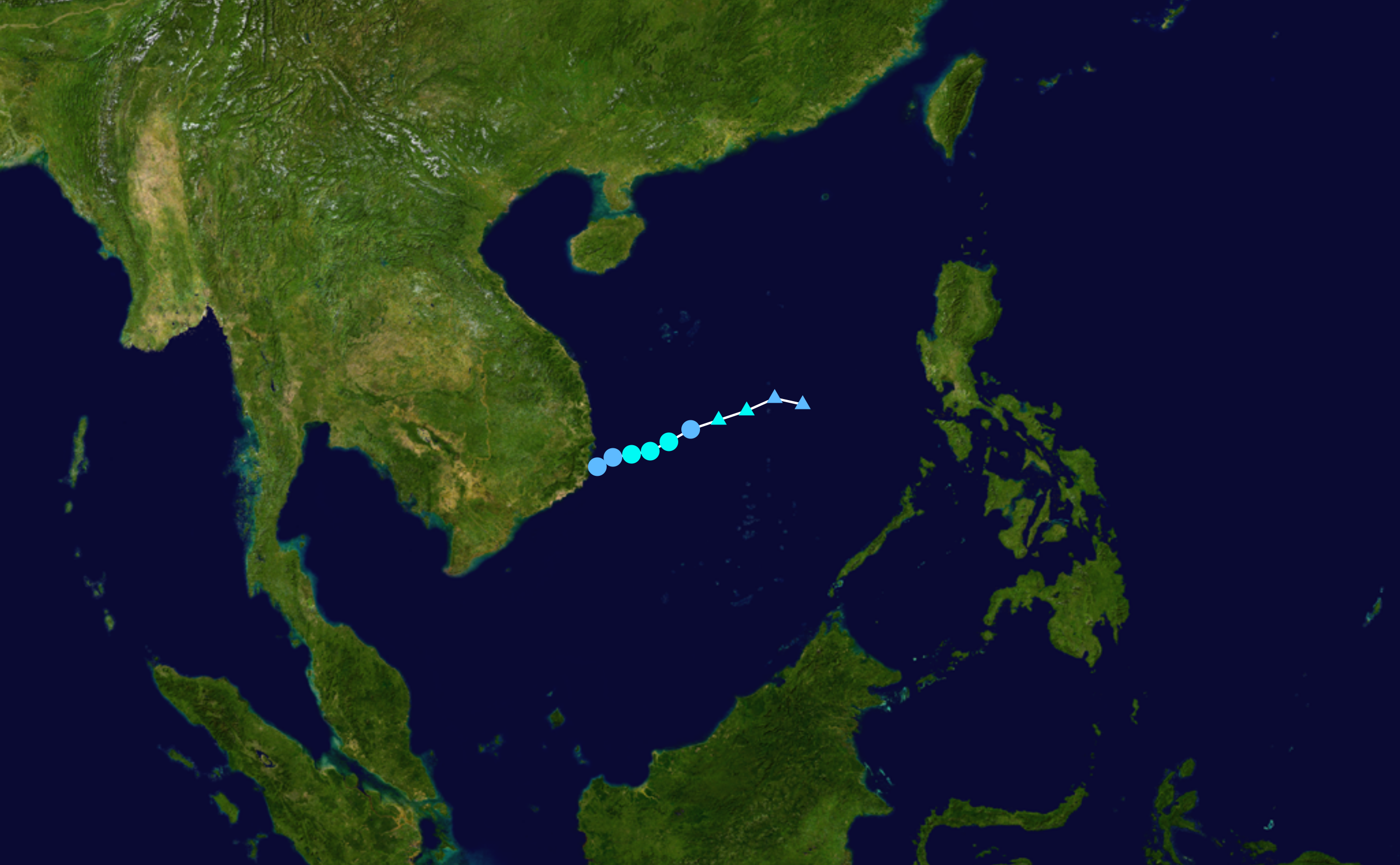
- Duration: December 14 – December 19
- Peak intensity: 75 km/h (45 mph) (1-min); 1000 hPa (mbar)

Judy developed in the South China Sea.

=== Tropical Storm Kit (Delang) ===
- Tropical storm (JMA)
- Tropical storm (SSHWS)
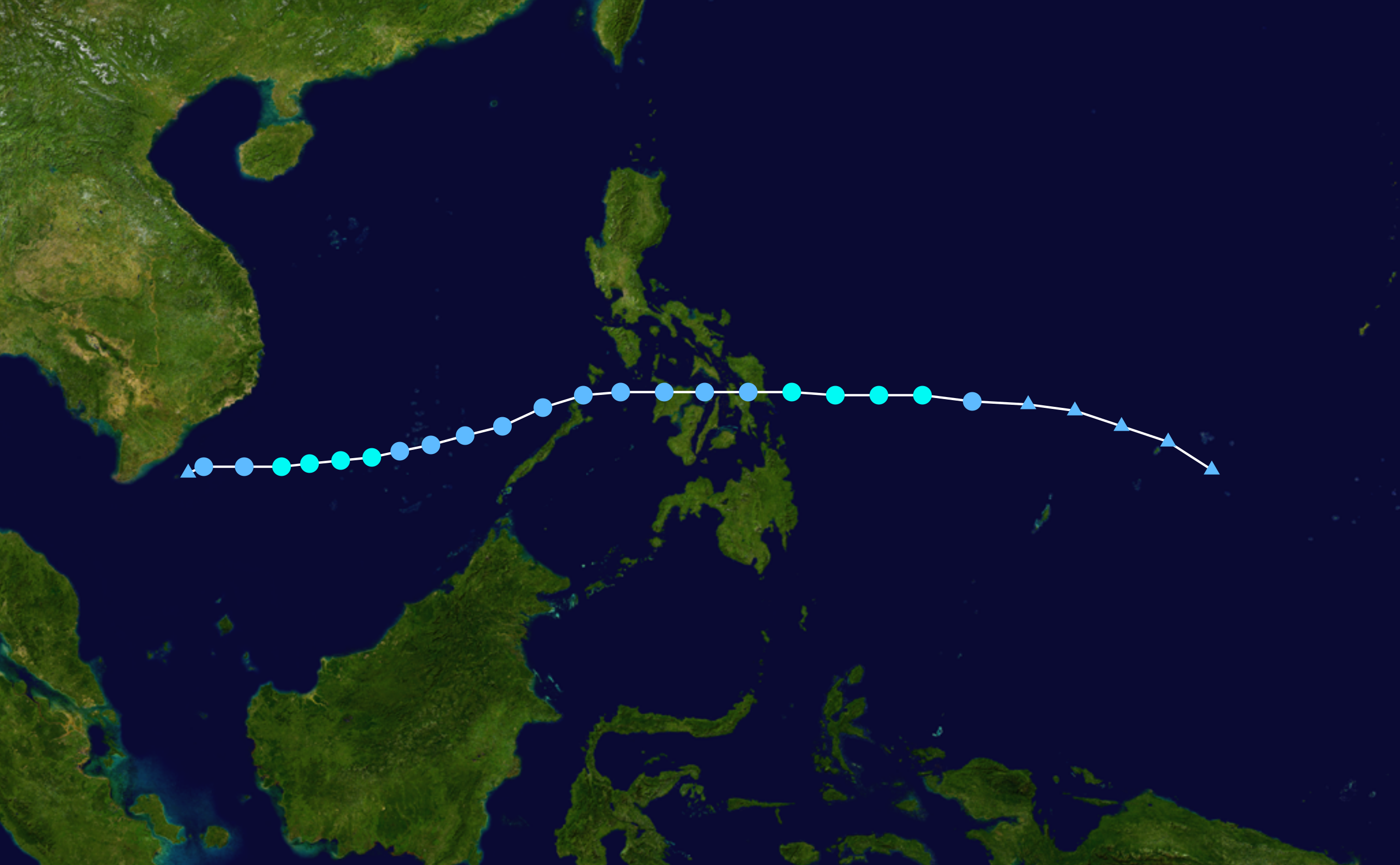
- Duration: December 18 – December 24
- Peak intensity: 75 km/h (45 mph) (1-min); 996 hPa (mbar)

Kit developed on December 18 in the open Pacific. Upon hitting the Philippines, the system weakened to a tropical depression. The storm re-intensified to a tropical storm in the South China Sea before dissipating on December 24.

== Storm names ==
During the season 32 named tropical cyclones developed in the Western Pacific and were named by the Joint Typhoon Warning Center, when it was determined that they had become tropical storms. These names were contributed to a revised list from late 1950.

Wanda	Amy	Babe	Carla	Dinah	Emma	Freda	Gilda	Harriet	Ivy	Jean	Kim	Lucy	Marie	Nadine	Polly
Rose	Shirley	Trix	Virginia	Wendy	Agnes	Bess	Carmen	Della	Elaine	Faye	Gloria	Hester	Irma	Judy	Kit

The name Olive from this list was used for a storm that formed in the Central Pacific.

=== Philippines ===
Atang	Bising	Klaring	Deling	Emang
Gading	Heling	Iliang	Loleng	Miding
Norming	Oyang	Pasing	Ruping	Susang
Tering	Uding	Wening	Yaning	
Auxiliary list
				Aning
Bidang	Kading	Delang	Esang (unused)	Garding (unused)

The Philippine Atmospheric, Geophysical and Astronomical Services Administration uses its own naming scheme for tropical cyclones in their area of responsibility. PAGASA assigns names to tropical depressions that form within their area of responsibility and any tropical cyclone that might move into their area of responsibility. Should the list of names for a given year prove to be insufficient, names are taken from an auxiliary list, the first 6 of which are published each year before the season starts. Names not retired from this list will be used again in the 1978 season. This is the same list used for the 1970 season. PAGASA uses its own naming scheme that starts in the Filipino alphabet, with names of Filipino female names ending with "ng" (A, B, K, D, etc.). Names that were not assigned/going to use are marked in gray.

Due to an extreme impact in the Philippines, PAGASA later retired the name Wening and was replaced by Weling for the 1978 season.

== Season effects ==
This table will list all the storms that developed in the northwestern Pacific Ocean west of the International Date Line and north of the equator during 1974. It will include their intensity, duration, name, areas affected, deaths, and damage totals. Classification and intensity values will be based on estimations conducted by the JMA, the JTWC, and/or PAGASA. Peak wind speeds are in one-minute sustained standards unless otherwise noted. All damage figures will be in 1974 USD. Damages and deaths from a storm will include when the storm was a precursor wave or an extratropical low.

Name	Dates	Peak intensity			Areas affected	Damage (USD)	Deaths	Ref(s).
Name	Dates	Category	Wind speed	Pressure	Areas affected	Damage (USD)	Deaths	Ref(s).
Wanda (Atang)	January 8 – 14	Severe tropical storm	100 km/h (62 mph)	992 hPa (29.29 inHg)	Mariana Islands	None	None	
Amy	March 12 – 20	Tropical storm	100 km/h (62 mph)	992 hPa (29.29 inHg)	Caroline Islands, Mariana Islands	None	None	
Babe	April 25 – May 3	Severe tropical storm	110 km/h (68 mph)	985 hPa (29.09 inHg)	Mariana Islands	None	None	
Carla	May 1 – 7	Typhoon	150 km/h (93 mph)	965 hPa (28.50 inHg)	Mariana Islands	None	None	
TD	May 18 – 19	Tropical depression	Not specified	1004 hPa (29.65 inHg)	Caroline Islands	None	None	
TD	May 21 – 23	Tropical depression	Not specified	1006 hPa (29.71 inHg)	Palau	None	None	
Dinah (Bising)	June 5 – 14	Typhoon	130 km/h (81 mph)	965 hPa (28.50 inHg)	Philippines, South China	$3 million	73	
05W	June 6 – 8	Tropical depression	55 km/h (34 mph)	1000 hPa (29.53 inHg)	South China	None	None	
Emma (Klaring)	June 12 – 19	Severe tropical storm	110 km/h (68 mph)	990 hPa (29.23 inHg)	Ryukyu Islands	None	None	
Freda	June 17 – 23	Tropical storm	85 km/h (53 mph)	990 hPa (29.23 inHg)	None	None	None	
Gilda (Deling)	June 26 – July 8	Typhoon	165 km/h (103 mph)	945 hPa (27.91 inHg)	Ryukyu Islands, South Korea, Japan	$1.5 billion	128	
Emang	July 5 – 10	Tropical depression	55 km/h (34 mph)	1000 hPa (29.53 inHg)	None	None	None	
Harriet (Gading)	July 13 – 20	Tropical storm	85 km/h (53 mph)	996 hPa (29.41 inHg)	None	None	None	
Ivy (Iliang)	July 14 – 21	Typhoon	175 km/h (109 mph)	950 hPa (28.05 inHg)	Philippines, South China	Unknown	66	
Jean (Heling)	July 17 – 21	Severe tropical storm	85 km/h (53 mph)	994 hPa (29.35 inHg)	Taiwan, East China	None	None	
Kim	July 22 – 24	Severe tropical storm	95 km/h (59 mph)	990 hPa (29.23 inHg)	None	None	None	
TD	July 26 – 27	Tropical depression	Not specified	1006 hPa (29.71 inHg)	None	None	None	
TD	August 1 – 3	Tropical depression	Not specified	1006 hPa (29.71 inHg)	None	None	None	
Loleng	August 4 – 8	Tropical depression	55 km/h (34 mph)	1004 hPa (29.65 inHg)	Philippines	None	None	
Lucy (Miding)	August 7 – 12	Tropical storm	85 km/h (53 mph)	996 hPa (29.41 inHg)	None	None	None	
TD	August 7 – 10	Tropical depression	Not specified	1004 hPa (29.65 inHg)	None	None	None	
TD	August 8 – 9	Tropical depression	Not specified	1000 hPa (29.53 inHg)	Taiwan	None	None	
TD	August 9	Tropical depression	Not specified	1004 hPa (29.65 inHg)	None	None	None	
TD	August 10 – 12	Tropical depression	Not specified	996 hPa (29.41 inHg)	Mariana Islands	None	None	
TD	August 10 – 14	Tropical depression	Not specified	996 hPa (29.41 inHg)	Mariana Islands	None	None	
TD	August 10 – 12	Tropical depression	Not specified	1000 hPa (29.53 inHg)	None	None	None	
Mary	August 11 – 27	Typhoon	175 km/h (109 mph)	950 hPa (28.05 inHg)	Mariana Islands, East China, Ryukyu Islands, Japan	Unknown	3	
16W	August 13 – 16	Tropical depression	55 km/h (34 mph)	992 hPa (29.29 inHg)	Vietnam, Laos, Thailand	None	None	
Nadine (Norming)	August 15 – 18	Severe tropical storm	95 km/h (59 mph)	980 hPa (28.94 inHg)	None	None	None	
TD	August 20 – 21	Tropical depression	Not specified	992 hPa (29.29 inHg)	None	None	None	
Rose (Oyang)	August 24 – September 1	Severe tropical storm	95 km/h (59 mph)	985 hPa (29.09 inHg)	Taiwan, Ryukyu Islands	None	None	
Polly	August 25 – September 5	Typhoon	175 km/h (109 mph)	945 hPa (27.91 inHg)	Mariana Islands, Japan	Unknown	Unknown	
20W	August 26 – 29	Tropical depression	55 km/h (34 mph)	994 hPa (29.35 inHg)	Ryukyu Islands	None	None	
TD	August 28 – 29	Tropical depression	Not specified	1010 hPa (29.83 inHg)	None	None	None	
TD	August 31 – September 1	Tropical depression	Not specified	1008 hPa (29.77 inHg)	None	None	None	
Shirley (Pasing)	September 2 – 11	Typhoon	140 km/h (87 mph)	970 hPa (28.64 inHg)	Ryukyu Islands, Japan	Unknown	Unknown	
TD	September 3 – 5	Tropical depression	Not specified	1002 hPa (29.59 inHg)	Japan	None	None	
Trix	September 4 – 8	Tropical storm	75 km/h (47 mph)	990 hPa (29.23 inHg)	South China	None	None	
TD	September 9 – 10	Tropical depression	Not specified	1008 hPa (29.77 inHg)	None	None	None	
Virginia	September 10 – 16	Typhoon	140 km/h (87 mph)	970 hPa (28.64 inHg)	None	None	None	
TD	September 10 – 16	Tropical depression	Not specified	1006 hPa (29.71 inHg)	Philippines	None	None	
TD	September 14	Tropical depression	Not specified	1008 hPa (29.77 inHg)	None	None	None	
TD	September 18 – 19	Tropical depression	Not specified	1006 hPa (29.71 inHg)	Philippines	None	None	
Wendy (Ruping)	September 19 – October 2	Severe tropical storm	110 km/h (68 mph)	985 hPa (29.09 inHg)	Philippines, Taiwan, Ryukyu Islands	None	None	
Agnes	September 21 – October 3	Typhoon	195 km/h (121 mph)	960 hPa (28.35 inHg)	None	None	None	
Bess (Susang)	October 7 – 14	Typhoon	120 km/h (75 mph)	975 hPa (28.79 inHg)	Philippines, South China, Vietnam	$9.2 million	32	
Carmen (Tering)	October 12 – 20	Typhoon	140 km/h (87 mph)	975 hPa (28.79 inHg)	Philippines, Hong Kong, Macau, South China	$13 million	25	
Della (Uding)	October 18 – 27	Typhoon	165 km/h (103 mph)	960 hPa (28.35 inHg)	Philippines, South China, Vietnam	Unknown	Unknown	
Elaine (Wening)	October 22 – 31	Typhoon	175 km/h (109 mph)	940 hPa (27.76 inHg)	Philippines, South China	$21 million	23	
Faye (Yaning)	October 30 – November 5	Severe tropical storm	100 km/h (62 mph)	985 hPa (29.09 inHg)	Philippines, Indochina	None	None	
Gloria (Aning)	November 2 – 11	Typhoon	220 km/h (140 mph)	930 hPa (27.46 inHg)	Philippines	Unknown	Unknown	
Hester	November 12 – 15	Tropical storm	65 km/h (40 mph)	1000 hPa (29.53 inHg)	Vietnam	None	None	
Irma (Bidang)	November 21 – December 3	Typhoon	215 km/h (134 mph)	940 hPa (27.76 inHg)	Philippines, South China	$7.3 million	11	
Judy (Kading)	December 14 – 19	Tropical storm	75 km/h (47 mph)	1000 hPa (29.53 inHg)	Philippines, Vietnam	None	None	
Kit (Delang)	December 18 – 24	Tropical storm	75 km/h (47 mph)	996 hPa (29.41 inHg)	Philippines	None	None	
Season aggregates
55 systems	January 8 – December 24, 1974		220 km/h (140 mph)	930 hPa (27.46 inHg)		>$1.55 billion	>361	

== See also ==
- 1974 Pacific hurricane season
- 1974 Atlantic hurricane season
- 1974 North Indian Ocean cyclone season
- Australian cyclone seasons: 1973–74, 1974–75
- South Pacific cyclone seasons: 1973–74, 1974–75
- South-West Indian Ocean cyclone seasons: 1973–74, 1974–75
