= Beatrice Muller =

American author and cruise passenger (1919–2013)

- Muller in a 2008 BBC interview
- Born: Beatrice Emily DuMont; April 24, 1919 (age 107)
- Died: October 4, 2013 (aged 94)
- Known for: Living on a cruise ship for nearly a decade
- Notable work: Queen Elizabeth 2: My Home In Paradise
- Spouse: Robert Arthur Muller (m. 1942; died 1999)
- Children: 2

Beatrice Emily DuMont Muller (April 24, 1919 – October 4, 2013) was an American author and long-term passenger on cruise ships. Muller was born in 1919 and raised in Somerville, New Jersey, during the Great Depression. In 1942, she married Robert Arthur Muller, a chemical engineer, and they raised two sons in a house in Bound Brook, New Jersey. The couple went on a world cruise on the Cunard Line ocean liner Queen Elizabeth 2 in 1995, the year Robert retired. As they enjoyed the experience, they returned every subsequent year for the ship's world cruise. During the 1999 world cruise, Robert died on the ship. In 10 months, Muller sold all her possessions and relocated to the Queen Elizabeth 2 to be a full-time passenger.

Muller lived on the Queen Elizabeth 2 between January 2000 and November 2008, the month the ship was moved to Dubai to become a floating hotel. She expressed interest in living on the Queen Mary 2 next, and she continued living on cruise ships until 2009. In 2010, she was living in New Jersey, where she was working on Queen Elizabeth 2: My Home In Paradise, a book she published in 2011 that described her experiences on the ship. Muller died in 2013 at age 94.

== Early life ==
Beatrice Emily DuMont Muller was born on April 24, 1919, to Newton Wesley DuMont (1889 or 1890 – 1936) and Helen Stout (1894 or 1895 – 1969). In 1630, Muller's ancestors, who were Huguenots, fled France for America. Her father began his career as an auto mechanic, was the owner of a radio outlet, served in the 2nd New Jersey Infantry, was a firefighter for 25 years, and was a member of Solomon's Lodge of the Free and Accepted Masons. Her mother worked in the office of the Somerset County clerk and was a founding member of the Century Chapter of the Order of Eastern Star. Muller's parents married on April 18, 1918, at the North Branch Reformed Church. She had a younger, sister, Janice L. DuMont Hartnagle (1922 or 1923 – 1997), who was a programmer and a recreational pilot.

Muller grew up in Somerville, New Jersey, during the Great Depression. She was a passenger saved from the SS Morro Castle when it burned off New Jersey in 1934. Muller was in the Girl Scouts of the USA and received a diploma from Somerville High School. On September 12, 1942, at the Second Reformed Church in Somerville, she married Robert Arthur Muller, who worked as a chemical engineer. The couple had two sons, Allan (born in 1949 or 1950) and Geoffrey (born in 1955 or 1956). During the summer, the family traveled to the Maine coast or South Carolina coast to board boats and spend time at sea. For around 40 years, the Mullers lived in a Bound Brook, New Jersey, house, where their sons grew up. In total, they owned three houses, including a beach vacation home at Briarcliffe Acres, South Carolina, near Myrtle Beach. In 1961, she and her husband founded a Myrtle Beach–based engineering consulting company, and in 1964, they returned to New Jersey.

A huge follower of the philosopher Meher Baba, she joined some friends who were traveling to Pune, India, at the end of the 1960s to create a Baba biographical movie, which took two years to make. Muller began an around 10-year undertaking of putting together an archive about Baba following his 1971 death. Other philosophers she followed enthusiastically were Pierre Teilhard de Chardin, George Gurdjieff, and P. D. Ouspensky.

== Living on cruise ships ==
=== World cruises, husband's death, and selling of possessions ===
In 1995, the year her husband retired, Muller grudgingly joined him on a world cruise on the Cunard Line cruise ship Queen Elizabeth 2. Her mother-in-law, who loved going on cruises, had previously shared her experiences with Muller who expected that she would dislike cruises, saying the atmosphere sounded "snobbish and pushy, with lots of furs and fancy jewellery". But after one week on board the ship, Muller and her husband really enjoyed the experience. They boarded the ship together every subsequent year for its four-month world cruises. At each port, they would visit the city to "keep [their] land legs".

The Mullers were married for 57 years until Robert's death at 85 years old on March 25, 1999, during that year's world cruise on Queen Elizabeth 2. The couple had been on their fifth world cruise on the ship, which had recently departed from Mumbai, India, when Robert was infected with a virus. Robert had smoked three cigarette packs every day for half a century. Owing to his serious emphysema, the infection was not able to be mitigated. Although Robert could have been transported from the ship to a hospital, he preferred to stay on the ship. Beatrice remembered him saying, "No, I don't want to get off. It's my time." In his final days, Robert was accompanied by Beatrice, the ship's doctor, an Anglican priest, and the captain. While receiving care in the ship's hospital, he died, having been rescued by the ship's physician in two earlier incidents. Allan, the couple's older son, arranged to have Robert cremated when the ship docked in Southampton in England. The New York Times reported that Beatrice ended the world cruise early to return to her Bound Brook, New Jersey, house, while the Tampa Bay Times reported that in the following weeks after her husband's death, Beatrice stayed on the ship and disembarked at the world cruise's completion.

Her sons suggested that she stay on the Queen Elizabeth 2 because her friends were there. Several factors contributed to her decision to accept her sons' advice. Muller was unable to drive owing to her bad vision. She did not have any grandchildren she could indulge. A large number of her friends were not physically near her, having either died or relocated to France or to balmy Florida. Including two houses she owned in New Jersey and Maine, she sold nearly all her belongings in the following 10 months but retained her Briarcliffe Acres, South Carolina, house as a rental. The sales were to fund her goal of living full-time on Queen Elizabeth 2. Upon the ship's departure from Los Angeles several weeks into her full-time living on board the ship, Beatrice and her two sons had an early morning memorial service for Robert with a chaplain, the captain, and friends, and his ashes were deposited into the water.

=== Living full-time on Queen Elizabeth 2 ===
On January 5, 2000, Muller began living full-time on Queen Elizabeth 2. Constructed in 1969 for $70 million, the Queen Elizabeth 2 housed 1,600 passengers and 1,000 crew. Every year, Queen Elizabeth 2 went on a 108-day world cruise. In the world cruise beginning around 2006 or 2007, it visited five continents, 25 countries, and 41 cities, and Muller said her favorite cities to visit were Auckland and Hong Kong. For a CBS News Sunday Morning story, host Charles Osgood and his team visited her on the ship in 2000 or 2001. After the story raised her profile, passengers recognized and approached her. The journalist Steve Kroft profiled her in a January 2004 60 Minutes story.

Muller lived at first in Queen Elizabeth 2's Stateroom 4068 and later in Stateroom 4062. Her room was a 124-square-foot (11.5 m^{2}) interior cabin. Beside her room's desk and mirror, Muller placed pictures containing her sons, her husband, and the Indian spiritual master Meher Baba, whom she followed. The room was furnished with a color television and tiny stereo. She brought with her a laptop computer, clothes, and books. The passenger line came up with the costs for sailings in the immediate future, and Muller and a Cunard vice president discussed it every January. After she received a spreadsheet of the prices, Muller prepaid her cruises by 60 days. Following a 45 percent price reduction for using "loyalty bonuses" from having earlier gone on five world cruises, it cost Muller $4,818 per month to live on the ship in 2001. She purchased her fare using a travel agent. Michael Ellison of The Guardian observed in 2001 that if Muller had stayed in "one of Florida's finest retirement communities", she would have had to pay a monthly fee of $3,300 and an admittance charge of $375,000. The base fare covered her meal costs, and she spent additional funds on gambling, outfits, and drinks.

Muller ate meals at a table seating two people in the Mauretania restaurant, which the Tampa Bay Times called the ship's "least-plush dining experience". The ship's doctor, captain, and hotel director frequently proposed that she join them as a guest during dinner. Crew members called her Bea, and she remembered all of their names. To occupy her time on the ship, she danced until 11:30 pm with "gentlemen hosts" in the Queen's Room, the ship's ballroom. After breaking her hip in April 2003, Muller underwent a hip replacement in the United States in 2004, leading her to avoid dance styles that put more exertion on her hip. She read books in her cabin, citing the Harry Potter book series as a favorite. Muller played bridge for two to three hours daily, toured the ship, read books in the library, and went to shows and talks. She read The New York Times in the morning and contributed to her diary.

From the ship, Muller stayed connected with people and news ashore. She used email for communicating with her acquaintances and watched television and read newspapers to stay abreast of what had happened in the United States. For voting in the 2000 United States presidential election, she was sent an absentee ballot. When she was worried about cost-cutting measures such as fewer staff and food quality, she sent "letters of concern" to Micky Arison, chairman of Carnival Corporation, parent company of Cunard Line; the letters received replies. She met celebrities on the ship including Bill Cosby, Vic Damone, and Marvin Hamlisch. Around 2000, she met Nelson Mandela, who traveled on the ship when it went from Southampton to Cape Town. Regarding the downsides of being on the ship, she said in a 2001 interview that she longed for her flower garden when on board and could feel isolated, stating, "I feel close to two or three people, but not as close as if we were lifelong friends." She really enjoyed when her children or passengers she had met before came on board. When it was Thanksgiving, her family joined her on the ship. She would eat lunch with two friends based in New York every time it docked at Manhattan Cruise Terminal's Pier 90. Security measures implemented after the September 11 attacks barred her from having friends on board as guests for tea or lunch when the ship stopped at ports. The ship was placed in dry dock, typically in Germany, at two-year intervals. Whenever this happened, she stayed with her older son in Middlesex, New Jersey. Her sons oversaw her financial affairs.

=== Final sailing of Queen Elizabeth 2 and book ===
In a 2004 interview, Muller explained why she thought Queen Elizabeth 2 was extraordinary, "It's like a little baby. A little baby is a beautiful little thing, but when he grows up to be a person, he's full of his whole life, and complex. He becomes a wonder. This ship? It's a wonder." When she was 89 years old, the Queen Elizabeth 2 sailed its final time in November 2008 before becoming a hotel based in Dubai. On the ship on its last day with Cunard Line, Muller was joined by her son Allan as she observed the ship dock at the Mina Rashid cruise terminal, the British flags lowered, and the Middle Eastern purchasers formally take custody of the ship. After disembarking from Queen Elizabeth 2 for the last time, she planned to fly from the United Arab Emirates back to the United States.

After nine years of living on Queen Elizabeth 2, Muller sought a second ship to board as she wanted to remain on the ocean. Of MS Queen Victoria, Muller told The Times in a 2008 interview that the ship "is lovely but she's not built to go as far as these ocean liners—she's not as strong". She said Queen Mary 2 was "the only liner left in the world" and hoped that Queen Elizabeth 2's officers would be relocated to Queen Mary 2. She told the maritime historian William H. Miller in 2008 that she planned to take the Queen Victoria's December Mediterranean cruise followed by Queen Mary 2's world cruise with a 100-day itinerary ending in April 2009. According to The New York Times, Muller remained on cruise ships until 2009.

In 2008, Muller was an "official resident" of Somerville, New Jersey, while she was still living on cruise ships. In 2010, Muller was living in New Jersey, where she was writing a book discussing her Queen Elizabeth 2 experiences. The president of Cunard had said to her, "Write your book—I'll sell it on my ship". In 2011, Muller published the book Queen Elizabeth 2: My Home In Paradise. She died on October 4, 2013, at 94 years old.

== See also ==
- Clara MacBeth

== Works ==
- Muller, Beatrice DuMont (2011). Queen Elizabeth 2: My Home In Paradise. Myrtle Beach, South Carolina: Sheriar Press. ISBN 978-0-913078-63-1.
