= Clara MacBeth =

American heiress and cruise passenger

- Undated photo of MacBeth
- Born: Clara Louise MacBeth; 1870 or 1871
- Died: February 10, 1970 (aged 99)
- Known for: Living on a cruise ship for 14 years

Clara Louise MacBeth (1870 or 1871 – February 10, 1970) was an American heiress and long-term passenger on cruise ships. In 1971, the Guinness World Records listed her as the "Most Indefatigable Cruise Passenger". She lived on RMS Caronia between 1949 and 1963, a period of 14 years. It cost her $396 in daily fare to live on the ship with her traveling companion Madoline Frank. Without accounting for inflation, Cunard Line received $4 million from her in tickets.

An only child, MacBeth was born to James and Elizabeth MacBeth. Her father made his fortune through inventing a dynamite detonator. He owned a large amount of real estate in Brooklyn and Queens, and stock in Long Island Bond and Mortgage Guarantee Company. After her father died in 1929, MacBeth inherited $719,788 (equivalent to $15,200,000 in 2025) from him. After her mother died in 1933, she inherited $708,391 (equivalent to $17,600,000 in 2025) from her. MacBeth served on the board of directors of the Long Island Bond and Mortgage Guarantee Company in 1931.

MacBeth died at the age of 99 in 1970. She left an $11 million estate (equivalent to $91,200,000 in 2025), two-thirds of which she bequeathed to her long-time financial adviser Henry Hottinger, and one-third of which she donated to the New York Community Fund. She gave $300,000 (equivalent to $2,500,000 in 2025) in a trust to her traveling companion, Madoline Frank, and $20,000 (equivalent to $166,000 in 2025) to her Caronia waiter.

== Early life and family ==
Clara Louise MacBeth was born in 1870 or 1871 in Brooklyn, New York to James and Elizabeth MacBeth and was an only child. MacBeth grew up in Crown Heights, Brooklyn.

She was a student of the gymnasium proprietor Avon C. Burnham and participated in a drama performance at Criterion Theatre in 1895. Joined by an organist, she recited the tale of "The Tramp", a performance the Brooklyn Citizen stated was "excellently done" and The Brooklyn Daily Eagle said was "loudly applauded". At the Christian Endeavor society's strawberry festival in 1897 at the Rochester Avenue Congregational church, MacBeth performed recitations that The Brooklyn Daily Eagle called "spirited and pleasant".

Her father invented a dynamite detonator, which made him wealthy. He died in Jamaica, Queens at Hotel Whitman in 1929 on November 14 or November 17. Having earlier been the chair of the Jamaica-based Long Island Bond and Mortgage Guarantee Company, he was its chairman at the time of his death and owned a large amount of stock in the company as well as substantial real estate in Brooklyn and Queens. He bequeathed $1,467,076 (equivalent to $31,100,000 in 2025) to relatives and friends; most of his estate was split between his wife and daughter with each receiving a share of $719,788 (equivalent to $15,200,000 in 2025). Having inherited his shares in the company, Clara MacBeth was a member of the Long Island Bond and Mortgage Guarantee Company's board of directors in 1931. Her mother, Elizabeth MacBeth, died at Hotel Whitman, on September 2, 1933, leaving $708,391 in her estate (equivalent to $17,600,000 in 2025) that largely came from her husband's bequest. Aside from giving her nephew and brother-in-law $5,000 each, a chauffeur $2,000, and some other relatives $12,500 altogether, Elizabeth gave the rest of her assets to Clara.

== Living on cruise ships ==
In 1908 and 1909, MacBeth joined her parents on the Hamburg America Line ship SS Moltke when it visited Asia. She was a passenger on RMS Franconia's 1935 Southern Hemisphere world cruise. She lived on the RMS Caronia between 1949 and 1963, a span of 14 years. The daily cost of living on the ship for her and Madoline LaBelle Frank, the widow who joined her, was $396. Without accounting for inflation, Cunard Line received $4 million from her in tickets. While living on the ship, the fares approximately cost MacBeth $20 million, according to a 2013 book. MacBeth visited Moore-McCormack's SS Brasil, where she met her traveling companion Madoline Frank's daughter and son-in-law Esther and Stanley Yurgartis, who worked onboard respectively as a waitress–cabin attendant and chief boatswain.

During the North Cape itinerary, the crew anointed her the "ice queen" at a party. MacBeth rarely left the ship when it reached a port. Asked whether she would visit Sydney when the ship docked there, she replied, "I visited Australia in 1949. I don't think I'll bother getting off again." During her time on the ship, her cabin steward and waiter remained constant and she stayed in the same room.

In June 1969, she was on the SS Statendam on an itinerary that included Tilbury, Torquay, Glengariff, and New York. In July 1969, MacBeth stayed on the Queen Elizabeth 2 for four back-to-back sailings. The 1971–1972 copy of the Guinness World Records listed MacBeth as the "Most Indefatigable Cruise Passenger". In his 2006 book, the maritime historian William H. Miller called her "the all-time record holder for cruising".

== Death and estate ==
MacBeth died on February 10, 1970, at 99 years old. At the time of her death, she owned an apartment located on One Fifth Avenue in Lower Manhattan in New York City. She had spent little time at the apartment as for 70 years she boarded various cruise ships. She created a will on December 17, 1954, to distribute her $11 million estate (equivalent to $91,200,000 in 2025). MacBeth gave two-thirds of her money to her long-time financial adviser Henry Hottinger, praising him in the will for giving "invaluable and friendly suggestions" regarding her finances. The New York Community Fund received one-third of her funds. She gave her long-time traveling partner, 68-year-old Madoline Frank, $300,000 (equivalent to $2,500,000 in 2025) in a trust. Annually for the rest of Frank's life, $15,000 (equivalent to $124,000 in 2025) would be distributed to her. In her will, MacBeth gave her RMS Caronia waiter $20,000 (equivalent to $166,000 in 2025).

== See also ==
- Beatrice Muller
