= SS United States: Lady in Waiting =

- Promotional poster for the film.
- Directed by: Robert Radler
- Produced by: Mark B. Perry
- Starring: Walter Cronkite; Mark B. Perry; William Miller; LeRoy Neiman
- Cinematography: Ilan Rosenberg
- Edited by: Curtis Sackett
- Music by: Stephen Edwards
- Distributed by: Big Ship Films, LLC
- Release date: May 3, 2008
- Running time: 57 Minutes
- Country: United States
- Language: English

SS United States: Lady in Waiting is a 2008 documentary film about the famed ocean liner SS United States, which was in service from 1952 to 1969. It features interviews of many past crew members and passengers about the background, construction, service, and life on board the SS United States. The film also focuses on the lighting up of the vessel by artist Robert Wogan while also showing footage of her years in service. The documentary also includes excerpts of footage Wogan filmed while exploring the engine room of the United States, all of which the artist later released on a 55-minute-long DVD. A charity screening of the documentary was held on March 11, 2010, the money raised going to fund the conservation of the SS United States.

== Reception ==
Lady in Waiting was praised by critic Kristiane Schmitt of Professional Mariner magazine saying "The film truly takes off when it launches into the ship's fascinating story" while Booklist reviewer Candace Smith called it "fascinating for ship and history buffs and anyone who enjoys glimpsing the glamorous past."
