= Cunard Yanks =

The Cunard Yanks (also known as the Boat Boys or Hollywood Boys) were the young working class British male Cunard Line household crew, who worked on the transatlantic shipping routes from Liverpool to New York and Montreal, from the late 1940s to the 1960s.

The Cunard Yanks are associated with the importation of 1950s American fashion and musical culture to Liverpool, influencing Merseybeat and the Beatles.
