= Beat music =

Pop and rock genre

Beat
- Stylistic origins: Rock and roll; rhythm and blues; rockabilly; skiffle; traditional pop; Brill Building; doo-wop
- Cultural origins: Late 1950s – early 1960s, United Kingdom
- Derivative forms: Garage rock; psychedelic rock; folk rock

Subgenres
- Freakbeat

Regional scenes
- Brum Beat

Other topics
- British Invasion; Carnaby Street; Swinging London

Beat music, British beat, or Merseybeat is a British popular music genre that developed around Liverpool in the late 1950s and early 1960s. The genre melded influences from British and American rock and roll, rhythm and blues, skiffle, traditional pop, and music hall. It rose to mainstream popularity in the United Kingdom and Europe by 1963 before spreading to North America in 1964 with the British Invasion. The beat style shaped popular music and youth culture through 1960s movements such as garage rock, folk rock and psychedelic music.

== Origin ==
The exact origins of the terms 'beat music' and 'Merseybeat' are uncertain. "Beat" alludes to the driving rhythms adopted from rock and roll, R&B, and soul music—not the Beat Generation literary movement of the 1950s. As the initial wave of British rock and roll was in height in the early 1960s, "big beat" music, later shortened to "beat", became a live dance style and alternative alongside the British rock and roll balladeers like Tommy Steele, Marty Wilde, and Cliff Richard who were dominating the charts. The German anthropologist and music critic Ernest Borneman, who lived in England from 1933 to 1960, claimed to have coined the term in a column in Melody Maker magazine to describe the British imitation of American rock'n'roll, rhythm & blues, and skiffle bands.

The 'Mersey' of 'Merseybeat' refers to the River Mersey. Liverpool lies on the eastern side of the river's estuary.

The name Mersey Beat was used for a Liverpool music magazine founded in 1961 by Bill Harry. Harry claims to have coined the term "based on a policeman's beat and not that of the music". The band the Pacifics were renamed the Mersey Beats in February 1962 by Bob Wooler, MC at the Cavern Club, and in April that year they became the Merseybeats. With the rise of the Beatles in 1963, the terms Mersey sound and Merseybeat were applied to bands and singers from Liverpool, the first time in British pop music that a sound and a location were linked together. The Beatles' debut album Please Please Me (1963) is often cited as the record that most exemplifies the Merseybeat sound. The equivalent scenes in Birmingham and London were described as Brum Beat and the Tottenham Sound respectively.

== Characteristics ==
The most distinctive characteristic of beat music was its strong beat, using the backbeat common to rock and roll and rhythm and blues, but often with a driving emphasis on all the beats of a 4/4 bar. The rhythm itself—described by Alan Clayson as "a changeless four-four offbeat on the snare drum"—was developed in the clubs in the St. Pauli neighbourhood of Hamburg, West Germany, where many English groups, including the Beatles, performed in the early 1960s and where it was known as the mach schau (make show) beat. The 8/8 rhythm was flexible enough to be adopted for songs from a range of genres. In addition, according to music writer Dave Laing,

[T]he chord playing of the rhythm guitar was broken up into a series of separate strokes, often one to the bar, with the regular plodding of the bass guitar and crisp drumming behind it. This gave a very different effect from the monolithic character of rock, in that the beat was given not by the duplication of one instrument in the rhythm section by another, but by an interplay between all three. This flexibility also meant that beat music could cope with a greater range of time-signatures and song shapes than rock & roll had been able to.

Beat groups usually had simple guitar-dominated line-ups, with vocal harmonies and catchy tunes. The most common instrumentation of beat groups featured lead, rhythm, and bass guitars plus drums, as popularised by the Beatles, the Searchers, and others. Beat groups—even those with a separate lead singer—often sang both verses and choruses in close harmony, resembling doo wop, with nonsense syllables in the backing vocals.

== Emergence ==
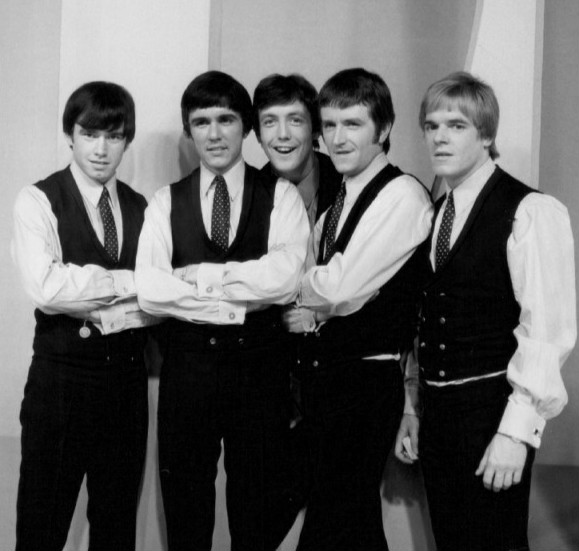
The Dave Clark Five appearing on The Ed Sullivan Show in 1966

In the late 1950s, a flourishing culture of groups began to emerge, often out of the declining skiffle scene, in major urban centres in the UK like Liverpool, Manchester, Birmingham, and London. This was particularly true in Liverpool, where it has been estimated that there were around 350 different bands active, often playing ballrooms, concert halls, and clubs. Liverpool was perhaps uniquely placed within Britain to be the point of origin of a new form of music. Commentators have pointed to a combination of local solidarity, industrial decline, social deprivation, and the existence of a large population of Irish origin, the influence of which has been detected in Beat music. It was also a major port with links to America, particularly through the Cunard Yanks, which made for much greater access to American records and instruments like guitars, which could not easily be imported due to trade restrictions. As a result, Beat bands were heavily influenced by American groups of the era, such as Buddy Holly and the Crickets (from which group the Beatles derived their name, combining it with a pun on the beat in their music), and to a lesser extent by British rock and roll groups such as the Shadows.

After the national success of the Beatles in Britain from 1962, a number of Liverpool performers were able to follow them into the charts, including Gerry & the Pacemakers (who achieved a number one hit in the UK before the Beatles), the Searchers, and Cilla Black.

Outside of Liverpool many local scenes were less influenced by rock and roll and more by the rhythm and blues and later directly by the blues. These included bands from Birmingham who were often grouped with the beat movement, the most successful being the Spencer Davis Group and the Moody Blues. Similar blues influenced bands who broke out from local scenes to national prominence were the Animals from Newcastle and Them from Belfast. From London, the term Tottenham Sound was largely based around the Dave Clark Five, but other London-based British rhythm and blues and rock bands who benefited from the beat boom of this era included the Rolling Stones, the Kinks and the Yardbirds.

=== British Invasion ===
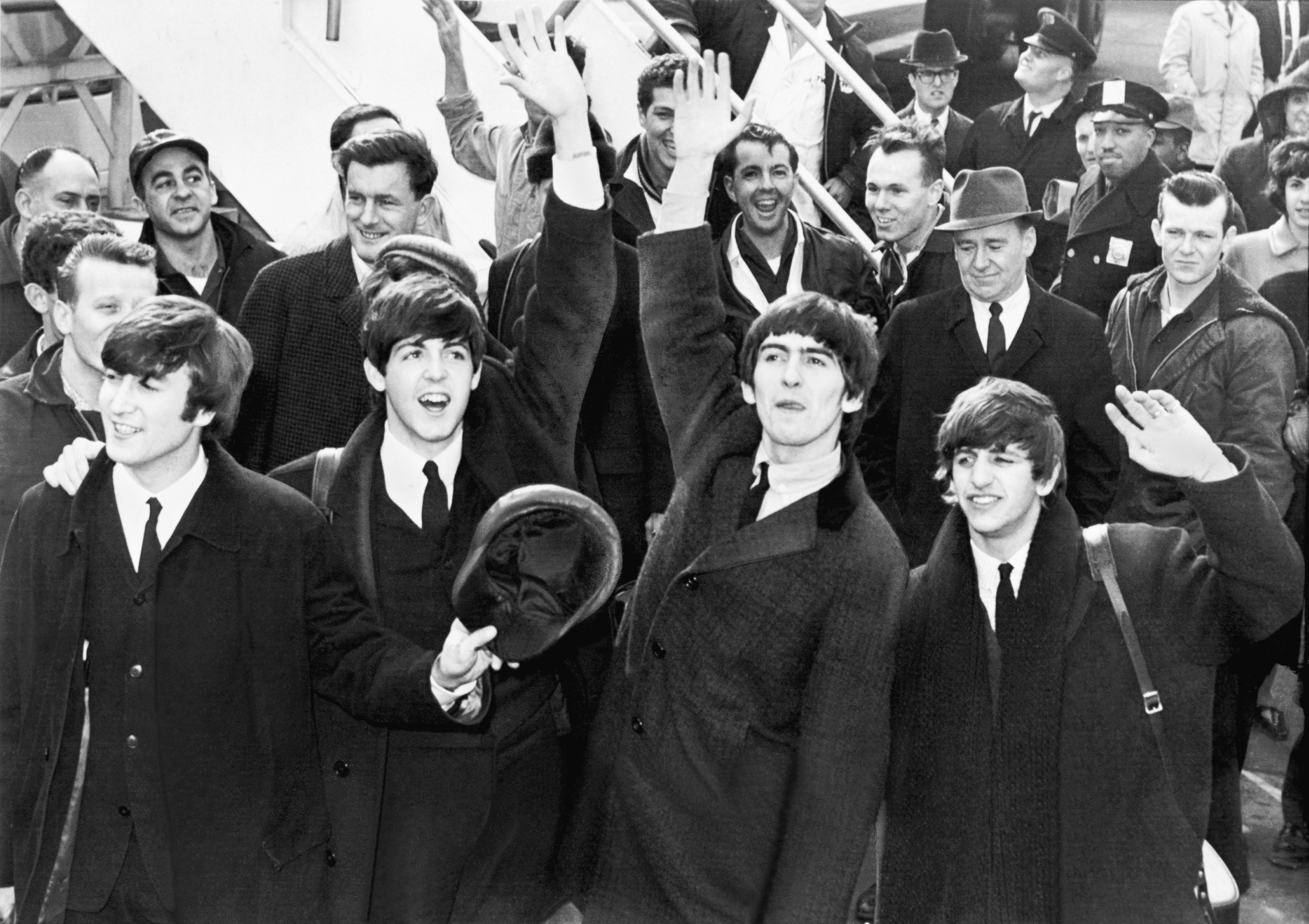
The arrival of the Beatles in the U.S., and subsequent appearance on The Ed Sullivan Show, marked the start of the British Invasion.

The Beatles' appearance on The Ed Sullivan Show soon after led to chart success. During the next two years, the Animals, Petula Clark, the Dave Clark Five, the Rolling Stones, Donovan, Peter and Gordon, Manfred Mann, Freddie and the Dreamers, the Zombies, Wayne Fontana and the Mindbenders, Herman's Hermits, and the Troggs would have one or more number one singles in America.

=== Freakbeat ===
Freakbeat is a subgenre of rock and roll music developed mainly by harder-driving British groups, often those with a mod following during the Swinging London period of the mid to late 1960s. Freakbeat bridges "British Invasion mod/R&B/pop and psychedelia". The term was coined in the 1980s by English music journalist Phil Smee. AllMusic writes that "freakbeat" is loosely defined, but generally describes the more obscure but hard-edged artists of the British Invasion era such as the Creation, the Pretty Things or Denny Laine's early solo work. Other bands often mentioned as Freakbeat are the Action, the Move, the Smoke, the Sorrows, and Wimple Winch.

== Decline ==
By 1967, beat music was beginning to sound out of date, particularly compared with the "harder edged" blues rock that was beginning to emerge.

Most of the groups that had not already disbanded by 1967, like the Beatles, moved into different forms of rock music and pop music, including psychedelic rock and eventually progressive rock.

== Influence ==
Beat was a major influence on the American garage rock and folk rock movements, and would be a source of inspiration for subsequent rock music subgenres, including Britpop in the 1990s.

== See also ==
- List of beat bands
- Category:Beat groups
- British rhythm and blues
- Freakbeat
- Garage rock
- Popular beat combo
