= RMS Caronia (1947) =

British ocean liner

Coordinates: 13.4552°N 144.6250°E

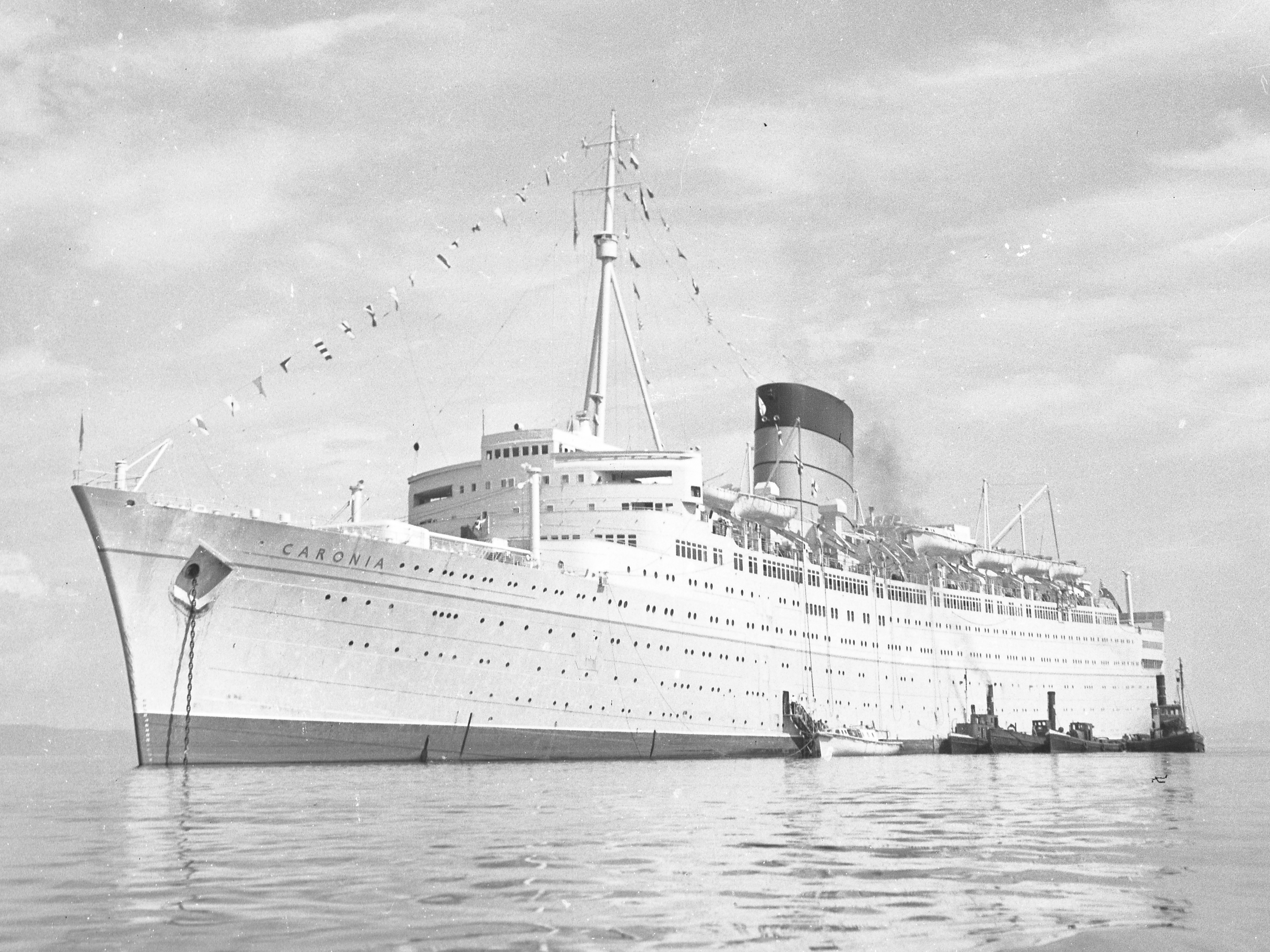
- RMS Caronia c. 1956, in the Trondheim Fjord

History
- Name: 1948–1968: Caronia; 1968: Columbia; 1968–74: Caribia
- Owner: 1949–68: Cunard Line; 1968–74: Universal Cruise Line
- Port of registry: 1948–1968: (United Kingdom) Liverpool; 1968–1974: Panama
- Ordered: 1946
- Builder: John Brown & Company, Clydebank
- Yard number: 635
- Laid down: 13 February 1946
- Launched: 30 October 1947 by The Princess Elizabeth (Later Queen Elizabeth II)
- Completed: December 1948
- Maiden voyage: 4 January 1949
- Out of service: 27 November 1967
- Identification: UK official number 182453; 1948–1968: call sign GYKS
- Fate: Wrecked in Apra Harbour, Guam, 1974. Subsequently scrapped.

General characteristics
- Tonnage: As built, 34,183 GRT, 18,570 NRT; 1956, 34,172 GRT; 1965, 34,274 GRT; 1968, 25,794 GRT (Panamanian rules)
- Length: 217.90 m (714.90 ft)
- Beam: 27.80 m (91.21 ft)
- Draught: 9.66 m (31.69 ft)
- Installed power: 35,000 shp
- Propulsion: Geared turbines, H.P. double reduction, I.P. and L.P. single reduction, twin propellers
- Speed: 22 knots (41 km/h; 25 mph)
- Capacity: 932 passengers (581 first class, 351 tourist class)

RMS Caronia was a 34,183 gross register tons (GRT) passenger ship of the Cunard Line (then Cunard White Star Line). Launched on 30 October 1947, she served with Cunard until 1967. She was nicknamed the "Green Goddess" after her light green hull livery. She was one of the first "dual-purpose" ships, built both for 2-class transatlantic crossings and all 1st-class cruising. After leaving Cunard she was briefly Caribia in 1969, after which she was laid up in New York until 1974, when she was sold for scrap. While being towed to Taiwan for scrapping, she was caught in a storm on 12 August. After her tow lines were cut, she repeatedly crashed on the rocky breakwater outside Apra Harbor, Guam and broke into three sections.

== History ==
After World War II, the Cunard White Star Line operated three ships on the Southampton—New York run. The famous RMS Queen Mary and RMS Queen Elizabeth operated a weekly express service between Southampton and New York. The smaller and slower RMS Mauretania served as an auxiliary ship on this route in addition to performing seasonal cruises out of New York City. The company placed an order for a running mate to Mauretania, a ship of similar speed and proportions for the transatlantic run. Ultimately this was not to be the role of the new ship, as Cunard White Star's executives decided that the new ship would be built primarily for cruising.

With this in mind, the new ship – soon to be named Caronia by Princess Elizabeth – received many different features from her Cunard White Star fleetmates. Amenities included an outdoor swimming pool as well as bathroom / shower facilities in every cabin. However, unlike modern cruise ships, her accommodation was divided into two classes on transatlantic voyages; First and Cabin.

On cruises all accommodation was sold as one class although many staterooms, both on A deck and R deck, were usually allocated to Cabin Class. Even some cabins on B deck were sold on cruises. Both restaurants served the same menu in just one sitting and passengers were allocated to a restaurant dependent upon the locations of their staterooms. On short cruises to the Caribbean and South America, every cabin was offered for occupation and often, as on transatlantic crossings, there would be two sittings for luncheon and dinner.

To distinguish her from Cunard White Star's express liners, the company decided to give her a different colour scheme. Instead of going for the then typical black hull with a white superstructure, Caronia received a unique livery of four different shades of "Cruising Green", making her a unique and easily recognizable vessel.

Another striking feature of the ship was her large single funnel, one of the largest ever installed aboard a ship. Similar to those of the later United States, this funnel easily caught the wind, making the ship somewhat difficult to handle. Caronia was the largest passenger ship to be built in Scotland after World War 2 until Queen Elizabeth 2 twenty years later.

Clara MacBeth lived full-time on Caronia between 1949 and 1963, a span of 14 years.

=== 1949–1959: A ship ahead of her time ===
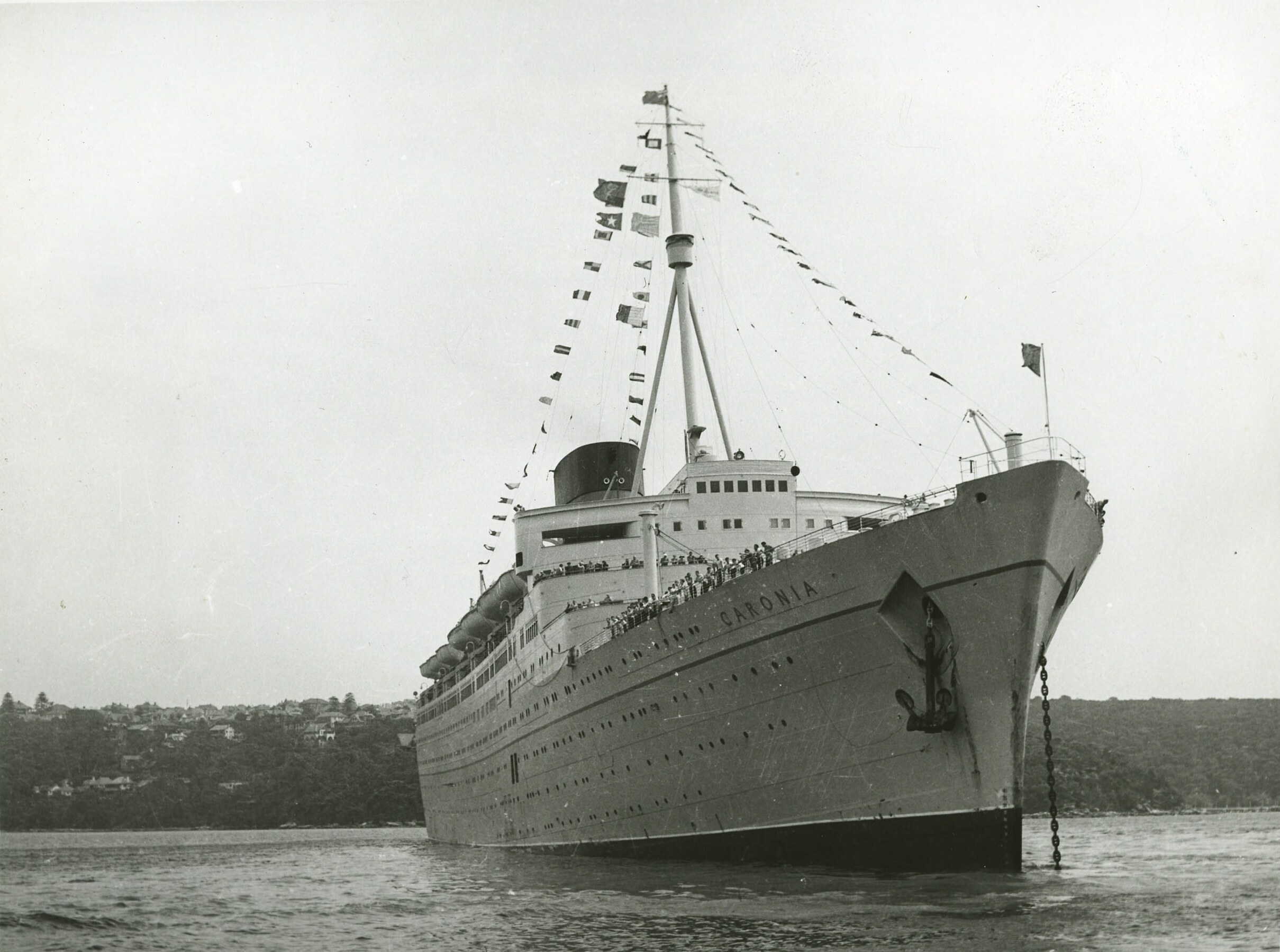
Caronia in Sydney Harbour

The brand-new RMS Caronia commenced her maiden voyage on 4 January 1949 between Southampton and New York. Two more transatlantic crossings followed before the ship embarked on her first cruises from New York to the Caribbean. During her first years she spent most of the year on transatlantic crossings; only during the winter was she engaged in cruising. In 1951 she made her first world cruise. From 1952 onwards she made transatlantic crossings only in August and September, with the rest of the year dedicated to cruising; during one such cruise, she ran aground in Egypt on 12 March 1952 while transiting the Suez Canal. In May 1953 Caronia made what was perhaps her most famous cruise, associated with the coronation ceremony of Queen Elizabeth II (who had christened Caronia six years earlier). The ship was used as a hotel, as most of the accommodation in the United Kingdom was fully booked.

Caronia ran aground at Messina, Sicily, Italy, on 31 May 1956, but was refloated the next day. Her annual refit in November 1956 saw Caronia modernised for southern cruising with air-conditioning outfitted through the entire ship. Her world cruise of 1958 saw her suffer the most serious accident of her career. Sailing slowly out of Yokohama harbour to avoid collision with a United States Navy vessel, she was driven by high winds against the harbor's breakwater, causing serious damage to her bow and demolishing a harbor lighthouse in the process. The United States Navy allowed Cunard to use their drydock at the Yokosuka yard for repairs to Caronia. That same year Caronia's autumn cruise in the Mediterranean had to be cancelled due to political tensions in the Middle East.

=== 1959–1967: Competition catches up ===
1959 saw Caronia making regular transatlantic crossings for the last time. Competition from the jet airliner meant there weren't enough passengers for her in the North Atlantic trade. From here her transatlantic crossings were repositioning voyages. The first each year being a Sterling Cruise, so called because all other Caronia cruises were paid for only in US dollars, and taking a southerly route via the Bahamas instead of the usual direct route. Decreased passenger numbers in the North Atlantic also meant that more of Cunard's liners were rebuilt into cruise use and received a similar green colour scheme to that of Caronia, which in 1962 were established as the line's official cruise colours when RMS Mauretania was repainted for cruising (though not otherwise significantly adapted for the role). In 1963 the heavily rebuilt and renamed RMS Franconia and Carmania followed suit. By this time Caronia's itineraries had settled into a yearly pattern, each cruise having found its ideal individual place in the calendar.

By the early 1960s other shipping companies were catching up with Cunard and building their own purpose-built cruiseships, which in addition to being better equipped than Caronia were better suited for cruising than she had ever been. To keep up with her newer competitors, Cunard decided that in November 1965 Caronia would be drydocked for ten weeks, new suites and a lido deck built, and her interior brought up to date. 1966 brought with it a seamen's strike in Britain, which upset Caronia's itineraries badly. As a result of climbing operating costs, 1967 was the first year when Caronia didn't profit her owners. Due to increased competition, Cunard decided to withdraw her from service at the end of the year. Fittingly, Caronia's last voyage for Cunard was a transatlantic crossing from New York to Southampton.

=== 1968–1974: Final years ===
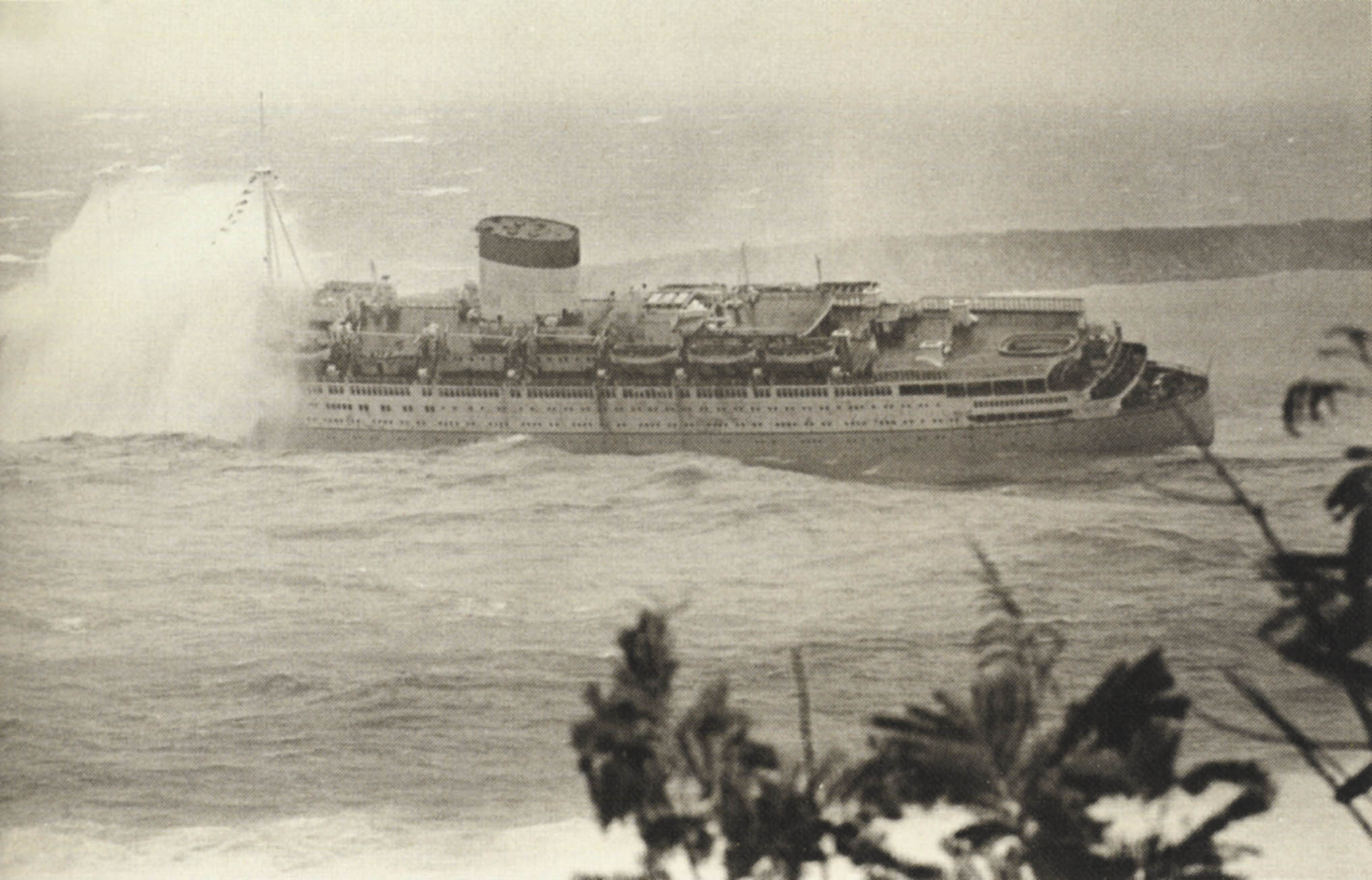
Caribia breaks up in Apra Harbor, Guam, August 1974

In early 1968 Caronia was sold to Star Shipping, a company owned by US and Panamian interests. Renamed Columbia, she sailed to Greece for refitting. Cunard had allowed Caronia to fall behind her maintenance schedule, and her engines needed a major overhaul. Replacement parts were ordered from a Greek company rather than from the original manufacturer. While she was being rebuilt Andrew Konstaninidis took control of Columbia, buying out the other owners of Star Line and renaming her Caribia. Her refitting was completed and she was given a new all-white colour scheme. She was registered in Panama, with her tonnage reduced to 25,794 GRT under Panamanian rules (which saved dock dues). In February 1969 Caribia embarked on her first cruise from New York to the Caribbean. The voyage was hindered by a malfunction in her waste system. Things turned for the worse on her second cruise, when an explosion in the engine room resulted in the death of one crew member and the severe scalding of another. In addition the ship lost all electrical power for twenty hours before repairs allowed her to return to port. The incident undermined public confidence in the vessel. Caribia limped back to New York, never to make a commercial voyage again.

Plans to revive Caribia were considered for the next five years, but she remained docked in New York and her berthing debts continued to accumulate. Finally in July 1974 her owners gave in and sold the once great ship for scrap. German ocean tug Hamburg was entrusted with the task of towing Caribia to a breaker's yard in Taiwan. Whilst near Honolulu the ship was in danger of capsizing; but repairs were made and they continued on. The two ships sailed into Typhoon Mary near Guam. On August 12, 1974, Hamburg's generators failed and her crew were forced to cut Caribia loose to save their own vessel. The storm's winds drove the lifeless ship against Apra Harbour's breakwater, where she was wrecked.

Being a hazard to local shipping, the wreck was swiftly cut up. However, before that could take place, it was discovered that the Caribia had come to rest beside the wreck of a Korean War-era landing craft. The landing craft was loaded with tons of munitions, including 22 mm, 40 mm, 5-inch, and 8-inch shells. This required the careful removal of all of these materials over five months before removal of Caribia could continue. Her removal was all the more urgent because Caribia's hulk blocked Apra harbor's entrance. As Apra is the only deep-water harbor on Guam, this made resupply of many vital commodities (e.g., petroleum products) impossible or difficult. No commercial or military vessels could leave or enter the harbor until a significant portion of the stern had been removed. By January 1975, most of Cariba's stern had been removed, restoring access to and from the harbor. Afterwards, scrapping continued onto her bow section. What was left of the wreck had been removed by late 1975. Her life ended just 25 years after she was commissioned. Despite being probably the most forward-looking ship of her time, Caronia was in active service for only 19 years.
