= Brum Beat =

- Editor: Steve Morris
- Former editors: Jim Simpson
- Categories: Music
- Frequency: Monthly
- Publisher: Steve Morris
- Founded: 1970
- Country: England
- Based in: Birmingham
- Website: roots-and-branches.com

Brum Beat was a monthly magazine about the music of Birmingham, England, and the neighbouring towns. The magazine was started in 1970 as Midlands Beat by promoter and band-manager Jim Simpson, who sold it to its latter editor, Steve Morris, who in turn relaunched it in newspaper format as The Beat, before converting it into a website.

It took its original name from the term coined in the late 1950s to collectively describe the city's music scene, in the manner of the Mersey sound.

It has been suggested that The Moody Blues, formed in May 1964, were the first of the "Brum Beat" bands to become internationally famous. other bands such as the Spencer Davis Group were members of the Brum Beat scene.
