= William H. Miller (writer) =

American historian (born 1948)

William Henry Miller Jr. (born May 3, 1948) is a maritime author and historian who has written numerous books dealing with the golden age of ocean liners.

Miller was born in Hoboken, New Jersey, on May 3, 1948, as the oldest of three children. In addition to his teaching career and writing over 40 books and many articles on the great liners, he was chairman of the World Ship Society's Port of New York Branch from 1970 to 1976. He was deputy director of the New York Harbor Festival Foundation from 1979 to 1982.

He was historian at the Museum of the American Merchant Marine in 1979 and creator of a course entitled "The Ocean Liner" at the New School of Social Research in Manhattan in 1981. He also created the passenger ship database for the Ellis Island Museum. He appeared in the documentary SS United States: Lady in Waiting. A documentary about his life and studies, Mr. Ocean Liner, premiered aboard RMS Queen Mary 2 on July 1, 2010.

In 2020, during the Coronavirus cruising pause, Miller started to participate in online Youtube and Zoom interviews, discussing cruising.

== Bibliography ==
- Transatlantic Liners, 1945-1980 ISBN 978-0-668-05267-2 (1981)
- The Great Luxury Liners, 1927-1954: A Photographic Record ISBN 978-0-486-24056-5 (1981)
- The First Great Ocean Liners in Photographs: 193 Views, 1897-1927 ISBN 978-0-486-24574-4 (1984)
- The Last Atlantic Liners ISBN 978-0-312-46971-9 (1985)
- Transatlantic Liners at War: The Story of the Queens ISBN 978-0-7153-8511-1 (1985)
- The Fabulous Interiors of the Great Ocean Liners in Historic Photographs ISBN 978-0-486-24756-4 (1985)
- Fifty Famous Liners 2 ISBN 978-0-393-01947-6 (co-author, 1985)
- British Ocean Liners: A Twilight Era, 1960-85 ISBN 978-0-393-02336-7 (1986)
- The New York Harbor Book ISBN 978-0-931474-34-7 (co-author, 1986)
- The Last Blue Water Liners ISBN 978-0-312-46980-1 (1986)
- Famous Ocean Liners: The Story of Passenger Shipping, from the Turn of the Century to the Present Day ISBN 978-0-85059-876-6 (1987)
- Liner: Fifty Years of Passenger Ship Photographs ISBN 978-0-85059-765-3 (1987)
- Great Cruise Ships and Ocean Liners from 1954 to 1986: A Photographic Survey ISBN 978-0-486-25540-8 (1988)
- German Ocean Liners of the 20th Century ISBN 978-0-85059-890-2 (1989)
- SS United States: The Story of America's Greatest Ocean Liner ISBN 978-0-393-03030-3 (1991)
- Picture History of the Cunard Line, 1840-1990 ISBN 978-0-486-26550-6 (co-author, 1991)
- Norton Lilly: 150 Years of Shipping ASIN: B0006P4WUI (1991)
- Modern Cruise Ships, 1965-1990: A Photographic Record ISBN 978-0-486-26753-1 (1992)
- The Chandris Liners ISBN 978-0-9518656-2-0 (1993)
- New York Shipping ISBN 978-0-9518656-3-7 (1994)
- Pictorial Encyclopedia of Ocean Liners, 1860-1994 ISBN 978-0-486-28137-7 (1995)
- Picture History of the French Line ISBN 978-0-486-29443-8 (1997)
- The Liners: A Voyage of Discovery ISBN 978-0-7603-0465-5 (co-author, 1997)
- The Picture History of the Italian Line, 1932-1977 ISBN 978-0-486-40489-9 (1999)
- Picture History of American Passenger Ships ISBN 978-0-486-40967-2 (2001)
- Picture History of British Ocean Liners: 1900 to the Present ISBN 978-0-486-41532-1 (2001)
- SS Independence SS Constitution ISBN 978-1-930098-31-2 (2001)
- Picture History of German and Dutch Passenger Ships ISBN 978-0-486-42063-9 (2002)
- Picture History of the SS United States ISBN 978-0-486-42839-0 (2003)
- Picture History of the Queen Mary and the Queen Elizabeth ISBN 978-0-486-43509-1 (2004)
- The Picture History of the Andrea Doria ISBN 978-0-486-43928-0 (2005)
- Liners of the Golden Age ISBN 978-0-9543666-2-9 (co-author, 2005)
- Great Ships in New York Harbor: 175 Historic Photographs, 1935-2005 ISBN 978-0-486-44609-7 (2005)
- On the Waterfront: The Great Ships of Hoboken ISBN 978-0-9768525-1-3 (2005)
- Doomed Ships: Great Ocean Liner Disasters ISBN 978-0-486-45366-8 (2006)
- SS Canberra ISBN 978-0-7524-4211-2 (2007)
- The QE2: A Picture History (2008)
- Under the Red Ensign: British Passenger Liners of the 50s & 60s ISBN 978-0-7524-4619-6 (2008)
- SS United States: Speed Queen of the Seas ISBN 978-1-84868-365-5 (2009)
- SS France/Norway ISBN 978-0-7524-5139-8 (2009)
- Cunard's Three Queens: A Celebration ISBN 978-1-8486-8364-8 (2009)
- SS Nieuw Amsterdam: The Darling of the Dutch ISBN 978-1-84868-366-2 (2010)
- RMS Caronia: Cunard's Green Goddess ISBN 978-0-7524-4211-2 (co-author, 2011)
- Floating Palaces ISBN 978-1-84868-698-4 (2011)
- The Great Liners Story ISBN 978-0-7524-6452-7 (2012)
- Along the Hudson: Luxury Liner Row in the 1950s and 60s ISBN 978-1-4456-0555-5 (2012)
- Great Atlantic Liners of the Twentieth Century in Color ISBN 978-1-4456-0373-5 (co-author, 2013)
- Classic Liners Île de France and Liberté: France's Premier Post-War Liners ISBN 978-0-7524-7486-1 (2013)
- SS Normandie ISBN 978-0-7524-8808-0 (2013)
- UNION CASTLE LINERS: Southampton to the South African Cape 1946-1977 ISBN 978-1-4456-0956-0 (2013)
- Cunard's Modern Queens: A Celebration ISBN 978-1-4456-3387-9 (2014)
- P & O Orient Liners of the 1950s and 1960s ISBN 978-1-4456-3813-3 (2014)
- Great French Passenger Ships ISBN 978-0-7524-9152-3 (2014)
- Great Passenger Ships: 1920-1930 ISBN 978-0-7524-8809-7 (2014)
- British India Steam Navigation Co. Liners of the 1950s and 1960s ISBN 978-1-4456-3591-0 (2014)
- Cunard-White Star Liners of the 1930s ISBN 978-1-4456-4968-9 (2015)
- Post-war Canadian Pacific Liners: Empresses of the Atlantic ISBN 978-1-4456-2137-1 (2015)
- Along the Waterfront: Freighters at New York in the 1950s and 1960s ISBN 978-1-4456-5408-9 (2016)
- First Class Cargo: A History of Combination Cargo-Passenger Ships ISBN 978-0-7509-6508-8 (2016)
