= Dennis Lennon =

British architect, interior designer and furniture designer

Dennis Lennon CBE MC
- Born: John Dennis Lennon; 23 June 1918
- Died: 16 April 1991 (aged 72)
- Occupation: Interior designer
- Known for: Co-ordinating the interior design of the Queen Elizabeth 2

John Dennis Lennon CBE MC (23 June 1918 – 16 April 1991) was a British architect, interior designer, and furniture designer. He was responsible for the interior design of the Queen Elizabeth 2 and of 190-192 Sloane Street, London.

Lennon worked for Fry, Drew & Partners and became the first director of London's Rayon Centre. In 1950, he formed his own firm, Dennis Lennon and Partners, later significantly contributing to the 1951 Festival of Britain. He took over Hamper Mill, near Watford, restoring decaying buildings.

He was the recipient of the Military Cross for his service during the Second World War and was made a Commander of the Order of the British Empire for his work as an architect and designer.

== Early life ==
John Dennis Lennon was born on 23 June 1918.

== Career ==
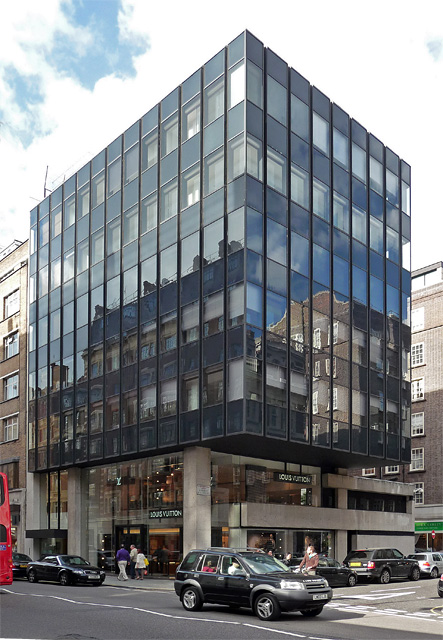
190-192 Sloane Street, London. Lennon designed the interiors.

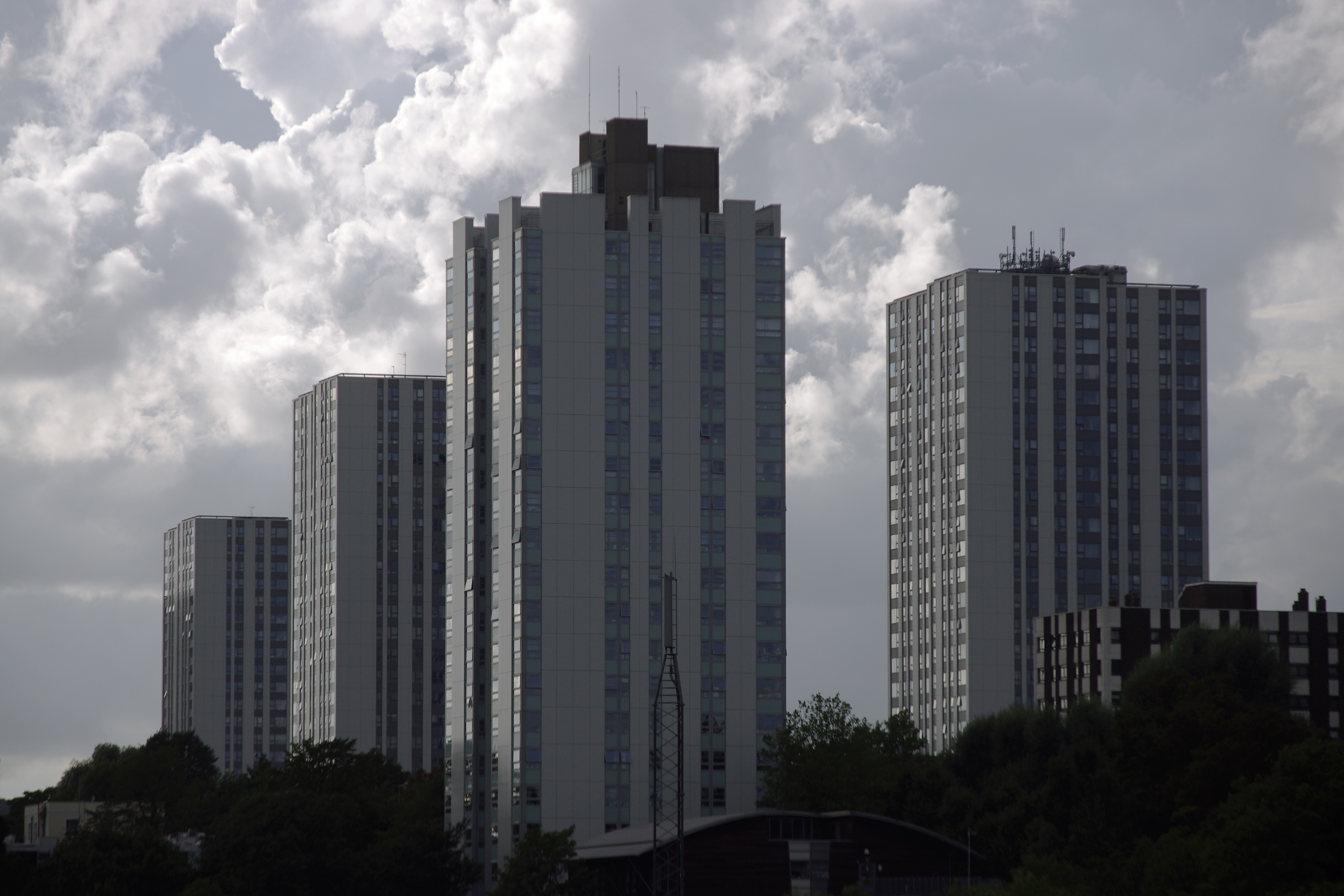
The Chalcots Estate seen in 2010

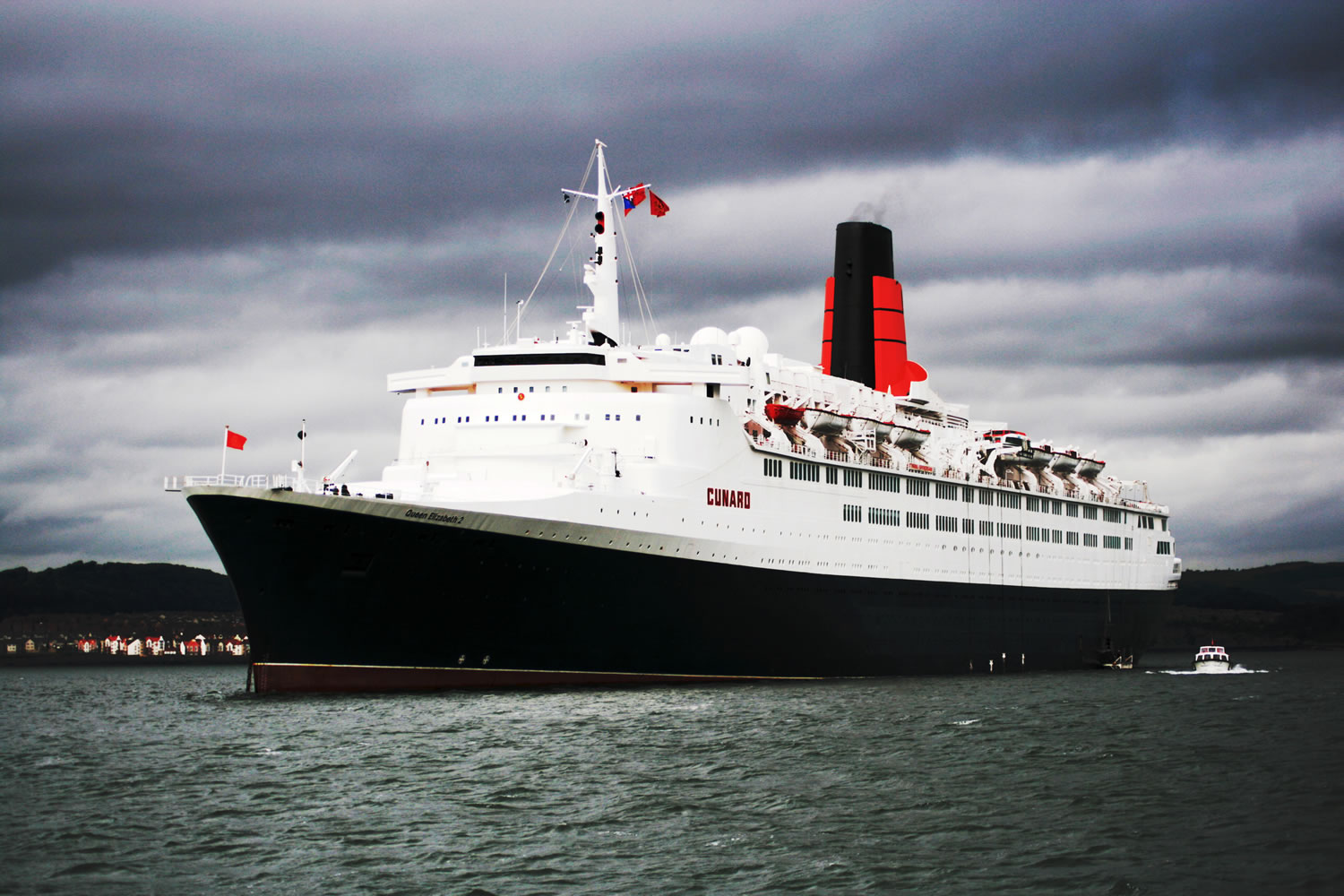
Queen Elizabeth 2. Lennon was responsible for the interior design.

He studied architecture, qualifying ARIBA, and worked for Fry, Drew & Partners.

He was the first director of London's Rayon Centre, in an 18th-century town house close to Grosvenor Square, which opened in 1948. Having seen Terence Conran's textiles at an end-of-term show halfway through his course at the Central School of Arts and Crafts, Lennon offered him a job at the Rayon Centre, where Conran later became art director. Lennon also gave a job to interior decorator David Mlinaric, early in his career.

In 1950, Lennon started his own firm, Dennis Lennon and Partners, in Manchester Square, London. He did "quite a lot of work" for the 1951 Festival of Britain.

He designed furniture and a table of his with a black ebonised base is in the collection of the Victoria & Albert Museum as is a wall light he designed. Pieces by Lennon appeared in The Studio's survey of interior design for 1953–54.

He was the set designer on many productions at Glyndebourne from 1963 to 1998.

Lennon designed the interiors at 190-192 Sloane Street, completed in 1965, and originally occupied by Sekers Silks, the British fabric manufacturer founded by Nicholas Sekers. His original interiors have not survived.

Among the architectural projects designed by Lennon's firm was the Chalcots Estate in Camden from around 1965 to 1970. It was refurbished in 2006–10 which changed the external appearance.

In the late 1960s, Lennon was responsible for co-ordinating the interior design of Cunard's ocean liner, the Queen Elizabeth 2, and his team included Jon Bannenberg and Gaby Schreiber, although his original designs only remained intact for three years. At the time, he said, "What we have tried to create is a setting for the world’s best party." In 1977, Cunard employed him to design additional space at a cost of US$1M.

== Honours ==
Lennon received the Military Cross in 1943 as an officer in the Royal Engineers and was made a Commander of the Order of the British Empire (CBE) in the 1968 Birthday Honours.

== Personal life ==
In the 1950, Lennon took over Hamper Mill, near Watford, restoring decaying buildings and turning them into homes. He lived at the Grade II listed Hamper Mill House.

His son Peter Lennon is married to Pam Lennon; they are both interior designers, based at Hamper Mill, and trade as Chess Interiors.

== Death ==
Lennon died on 16 April 1991 leaving an estate of £210,815.
