= 190–192 Sloane Street =

Building in London

Coordinates: 51.5003°N 0.1597°W

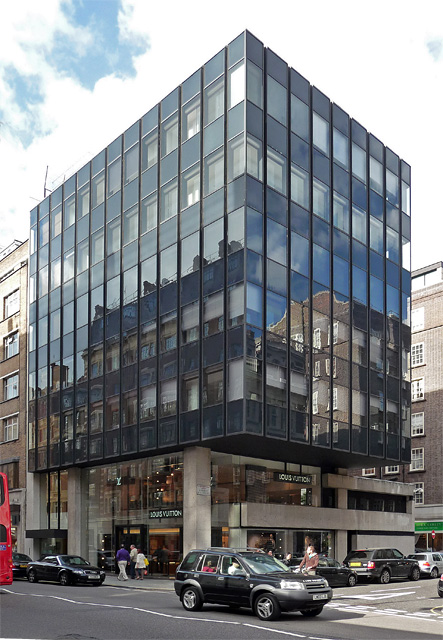
190–192 Sloane Street

190–192 Sloane Street, also known as the Sekers Building, is a Grade II listed building on Sloane Street, London, at the junction with Harriet Street.

== Design ==
The building was designed by the architects Brett and Pollen, primarily the partner Harry Teggin, for the Cadogan Estate, and completed in 1965. The interiors were designed by Dennis Lennon, with fittings by the sculptor Robert Adams, but do not survive.

== Sekers era ==
The ground floor showrooms were originally occupied by Sekers Fabrics, the British fabric manufacturer founded by Nicholas Sekers.

The company, based in Whitehaven, Cumbria, was awarded the Duke of Edinburgh prize for elegant design in 1962, 1965 and 1973, and a Royal warrant was awarded as suppliers of furnishing fabric to Her Majesty the Queen. In 1964, they established their London showroom at 190–192 Sloane Street.
