= Sloane Street =

Major thoroughfare in the Royal Borough of Kensington & Chelsea

Coordinates: 51.49667°N 0.15844°W

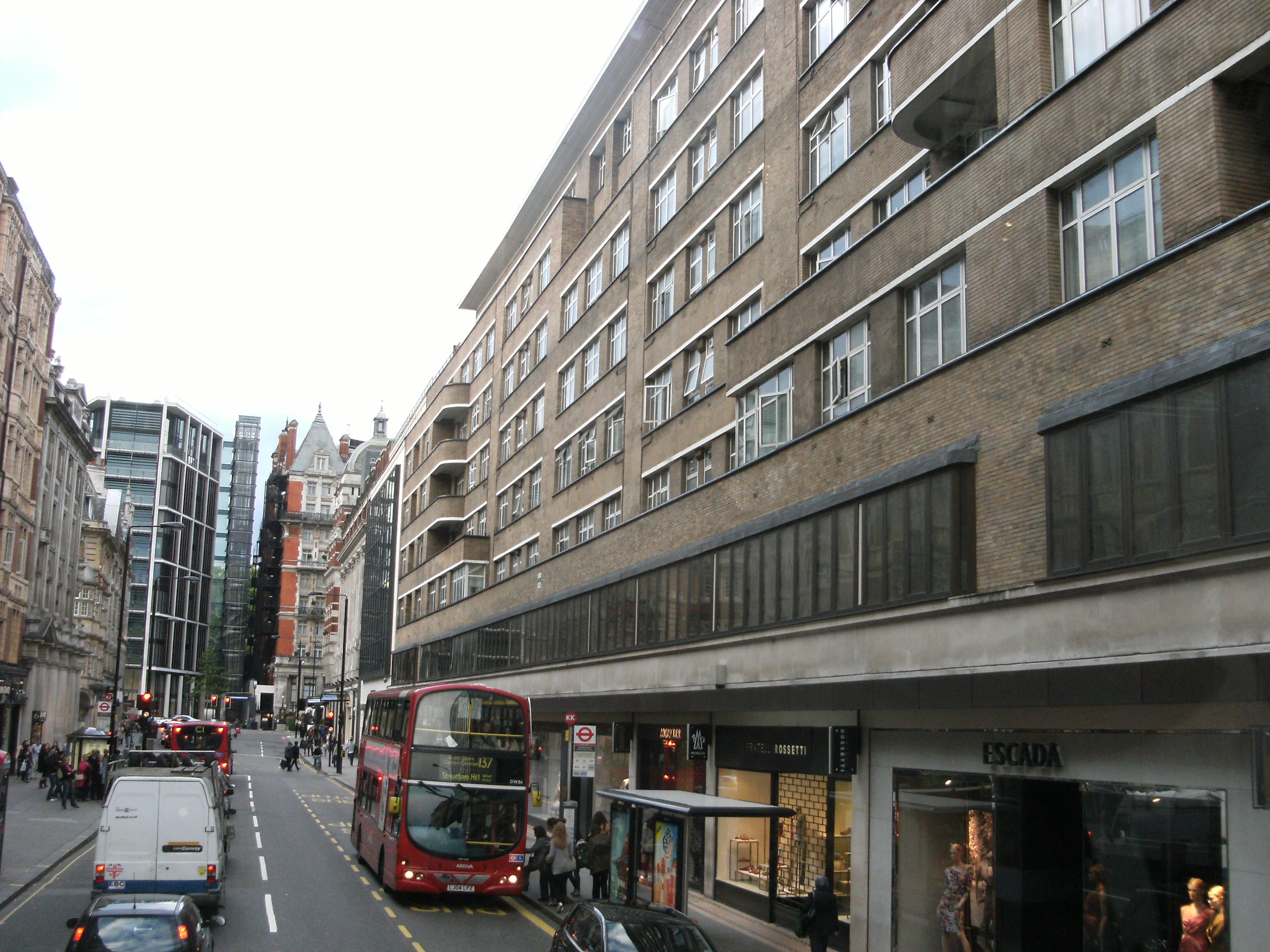
Sloane Street

Sloane Street is a major London street in the Royal Borough of Kensington and Chelsea which runs north to south, from Knightsbridge to Sloane Square, crossing Pont Street about halfway along.

== History ==
Sloane Street takes its name from Sir Hans Sloane, who purchased the surrounding area in 1712. Many of the properties in the street still belong to his descendants, the Earls Cadogan, via their company Cadogan Estates.

Sloane Street has long been a fashionable shopping street, especially the northern section closest to Knightsbridge, which is known informally as Upper Sloane Street. Since the 1990s Sloane Street's status has increased further, and it is now on a par with Bond Street, which has been London's most exclusive shopping street for two centuries. The street has flagship stores for many of the world's most famous brands in fashion.

== In popular culture ==
Sloane Street, along with Sloane Square, also gives its name to "Sloane Rangers", originally applied to the stereotypical kind of young upper class English ladies seen in the area. The expression was roughly the female equivalent to the term "Hooray Henry", used to describe brash, upper-class young English public school boys, although this term is not geographically restricted and is used all over the UK.

== Real estate ownership and character ==
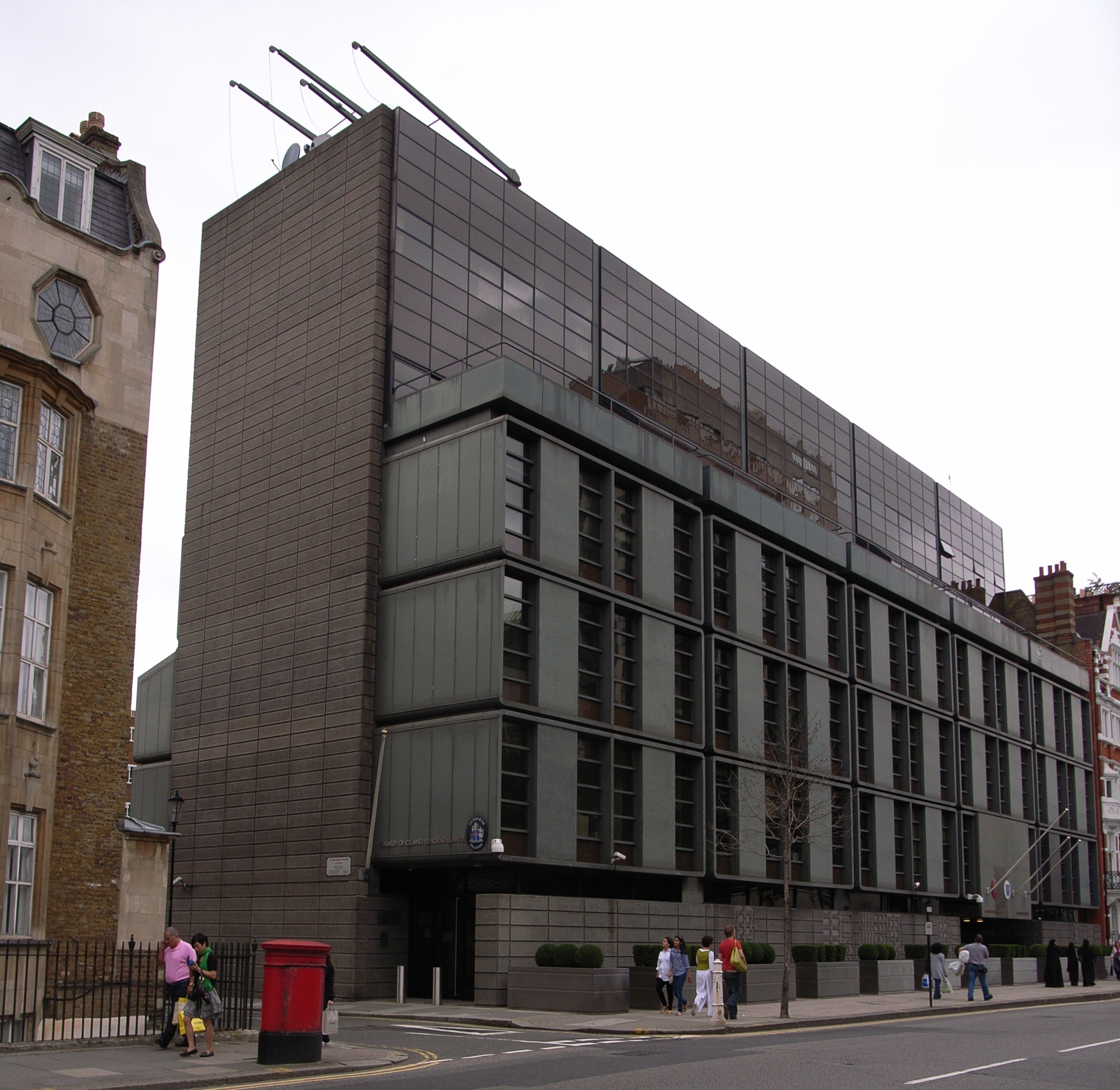
Danish and Icelandic Embassy

During the 1990s, Dubai's ruling Al Maktoum family, led by Mohammed bin Rashid Al Maktoum, bought most of the properties on the west side of Sloane Street at the Knightsbridge end. The National Bank of Dubai opened its first overseas branch in London to serve the many UAE-based visitors who rent these properties in summer. The Jumeirah Carlton Tower Hotel is owned by the hotels arm of Dubai Holding Company, which is also controlled by Sheikh Mohammed.

The northern half of the street is near Knightsbridge and is home to a few smart, more modern residential blocks, all with 24-hour porterage, the Cadogan Hotel and Millennium Hotel. Harrods lies next to Hans Place immediately to the west along Basil Street and Hans Crescent, and Lowndes Square lies to the east. Harvey Nichols lies at the corner of Knightsbridge and Sloane Street.

The southern half of the street has much more individual character, with a number of typical Pont Street Dutch style red brick buildings, built in the 19th century by Earl Cadogan, which house elegant apartments. In the most exclusive residential area of the street, which is between Sloane Square and Cadogan Place, some of the residences have remained as whole houses.

== Notable buildings ==
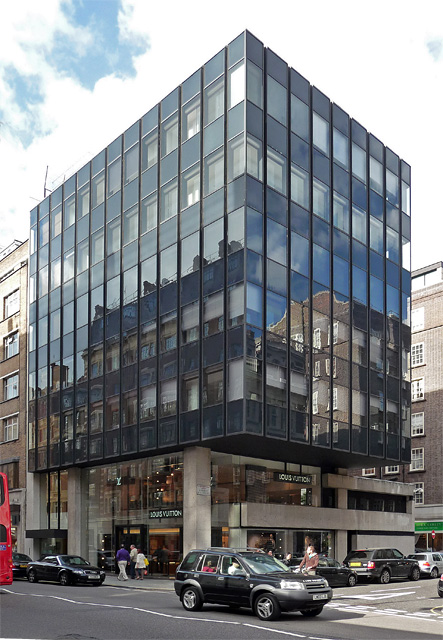
190-192 Sloane Street

Notable buildings include:

- Holy Trinity Sloane Street by the Victorian architect J.D. Sedding
- The Danish Embassy designed by Arne Jacobsen (shared with the Embassy of Iceland)
- 51-52 Sloane Street, the Embassy of Peru.
- 64 Sloane Street, designed by Fairfax Blomfield Wade-Palmer.
- 190-192 Sloane Street.
- 123 Sloane Street.
- 139 Sloane Street.
