= Queen Elizabeth 2 =

British ocean liner

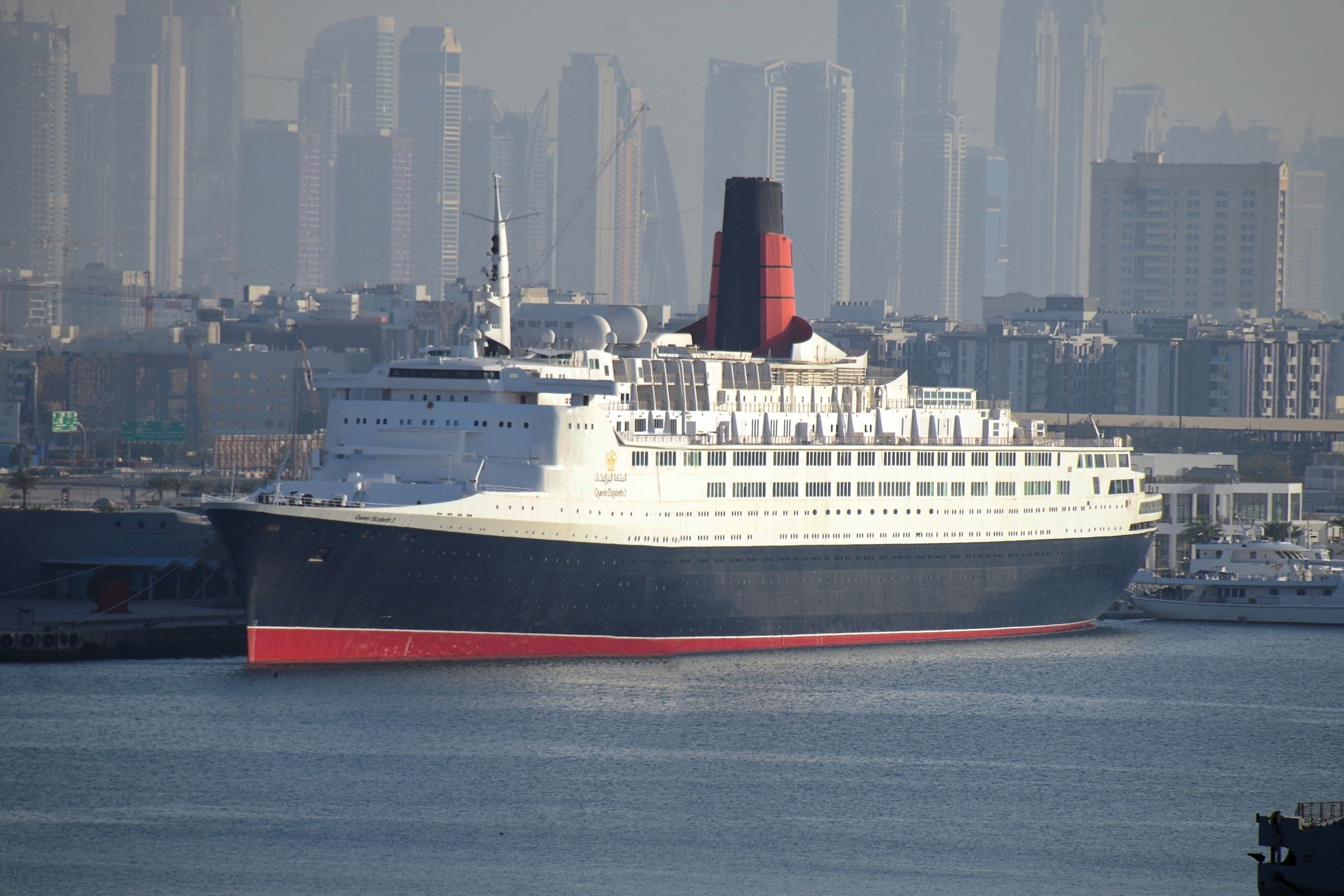
- Queen Elizabeth 2 as a floating hotel in Dubai on 5 March 2020

History
- Name: Queen Elizabeth 2
- Namesake: RMS Queen Elizabeth
- Owner: 1969–1971: Cunard Steamship Company Ltd; 1971–1998: Trafalgar House; 1998–2008: Carnival Corporation & plc; 2008 onwards: Istithmar World, Dubai
- Operator: 1969–2008: Cunard Line; 2008–2022: PCFC Hotels; 2022–present: Accor
- Port of registry: 1969–2008: Southampton, United Kingdom; 2008–2018: Port Vila, Vanuatu; 2018 onwards: (United Arab Emirates) Dubai, UAE
- Route: North Atlantic & world cruising during Cunard service
- Ordered: 1964
- Builder: John Brown and Company (Upper Clyde Shipbuilders), Clydebank, Scotland
- Cost: £29,091,000
- Yard number: 736
- Laid down: 5 July 1965
- Launched: 20 September 1967 by Queen Elizabeth II
- Completed: 26 November 1968 (Sea trials commenced)
- Maiden voyage: 2 May 1969
- In service: 1969–2008
- Out of service: 27 November 2008
- Identification: IMO number: 6725418; 1968–2009: Callsign: GBTT, British ON 336703; 2009–present: Callsign: YJVW6, MMSI number: 576059000
- Status: Floating hotel & museum at Mina Rashid, Dubai

General characteristics
- Tonnage: (1968): 65,863 GRT, 37,218 NRT; (1994): 70,327 GRT, 37,182 NRT
- Displacement: 49,708 long tons (50,506 metric tons)
- Length: 963 ft (293.5 m)
- Beam: 105 ft (32.0 m)
- Height: 171 ft (52.1 m)
- Draught: 32 ft (9.8 m)
- Decks: 10
- Installed power: 3 × Foster Wheeler ESD II Boilers (original design); 9 × MAN B&W 9L58/64 (1987 refit)
- Propulsion: Two Brown-Pametrada Steam Turbines (original design); Two GEC propulsion motors (2 × 44 MW) (1987 refit); Two five-bladed variable-pitch propellers (post powerplant replacement)
- Speed: 34 knots (63 km/h; 39 mph) max; 28.5 knots (52.8 km/h; 32.8 mph) service
- Capacity: 1,777 passengers; 1,892 (all berths) passengers
- Crew: 1,040

Queen Elizabeth 2 (QE2) is a retired British ocean liner. Built by John Brown & Company on the River Clyde in Scotland for the Cunard Line, the ship was operated as a transatlantic liner and cruise ship from 1969 to 2008. She was laid up until converted into a floating hotel in Dubai.

Queen Elizabeth 2 plied the route from her home port of Southampton, United Kingdom, to New York, United States. She served as the flagship of the line from 1969 until she was succeeded by Queen Mary 2 in 2004. Queen Elizabeth 2 was designed in Cunard's offices in Liverpool and Southampton and built in Clydebank, Scotland. She was refitted with a modern diesel powerplant in 1986–87.

Queen Elizabeth 2 retired from active Cunard service on 27 November 2008, and was acquired by the private equity arm of Dubai World, which planned to begin conversion of the vessel to a 500-room floating hotel moored at the Palm Jumeirah, Dubai. Due to the 2008 financial crisis, the ship was laid up at Dubai Drydocks and later Mina Rashid. Subsequent conversion plans were announced in 2012 and then again by the Oceanic Group in 2013, but both plans stalled.

The restored QE2 opened to visitors on 18 April 2018 and today operates as a floating hotel in Dubai, managed since 2024 by French hotel chain Accor.

== Development ==
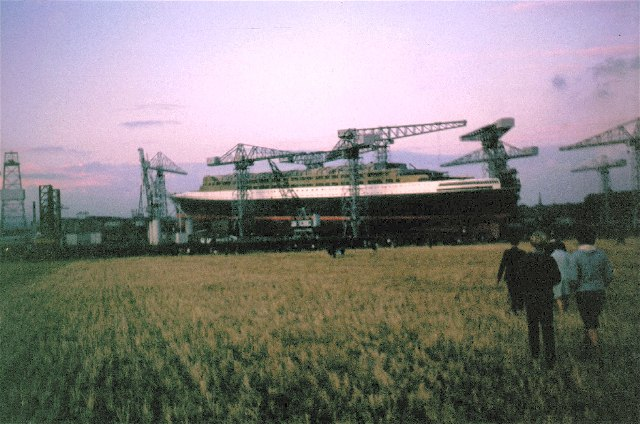
QE2's hull at Number 736 on the slipway, 1967

By 1957, transatlantic sea travel was becoming displaced by air transit due to its speed and low relative cost, with passenger numbers split 50:50 between them. Simultaneously, the aging Queen Mary and Queen Elizabeth were becoming increasingly expensive to operate, and both internally and externally were relics of the pre-war era.

Despite falling passenger revenues, Cunard did not want to give up its traditional role as a provider of a North Atlantic passenger service and Royal Mail carrier, and so decided to replace the obsolete Queens with a new generation liner.

Designated Q3 during work-up, it was projected to measure 75,000 gross register tons, have berths for 2,270 passengers, and cost about £30 million.

Work had proceeded as far as the preparation of submissions from six shipyards and applying for government financial assistance with the construction when misgivings among some executives and directors, coupled with a shareholder revolt, led to the benefits of the project being reappraised and ultimately cancelled on 19 October 1961.

Cunard decided to continue with a replacement plan but with an altered operating regime and more flexible design. Realising the decline of transatlantic trade, it was visualised that the new Queen would be dual-purpose three-class ship offering First, Cabin and Tourist passage for eight months a year on the transatlantic route, then as a cruise ship in warmer climates and during the winter months.

Compared with the older Queens, which had two engine rooms and four propellers, the newly designated Q4 would be much smaller, with one boiler room, one engine room, and two propellers, which, combined with automation, would allow a smaller engineering complement. Producing 110,000 shp, the new ship was to have the same 28.5 knots (52.8 km/h) service speed as her predecessors, while consuming half the fuel. A reduction to 520 tons per 24 hours was estimated to save Cunard £1 million annually. Able to transit both the Panama and Suez canals, her 7-foot (2.1 m) shallower draught of 32 feet (9.8 m) would allow her to enter more and smaller ports than the old ships.

== Design ==
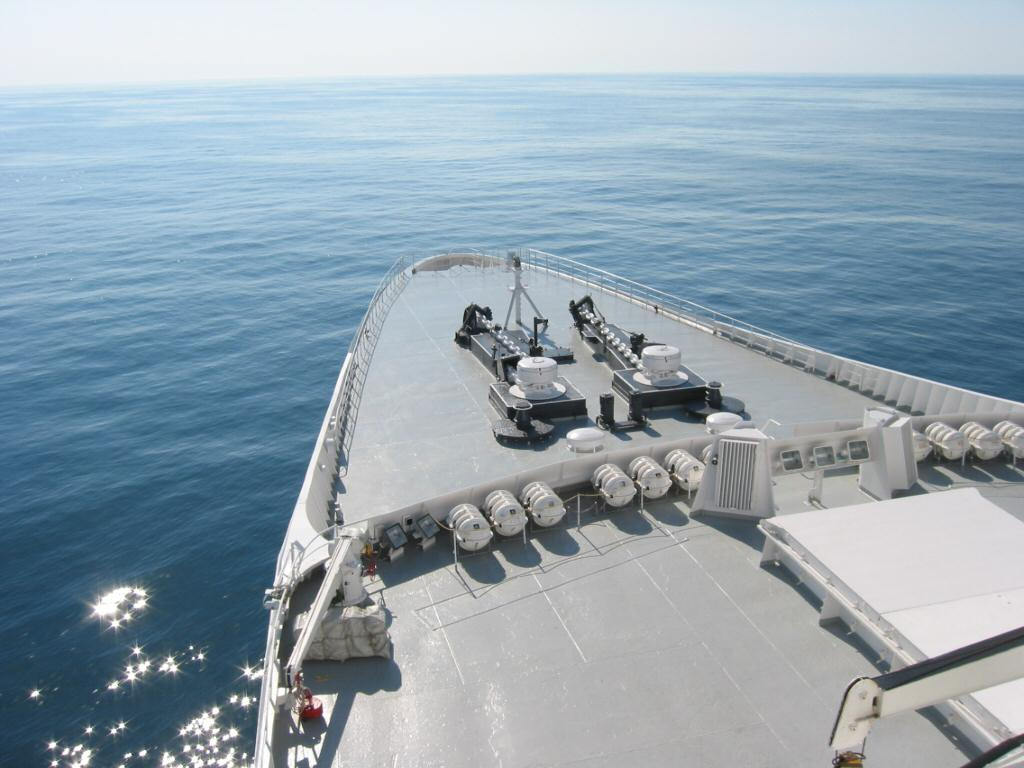
Queen Elizabeth 2's bow was typical of regular service ocean liners, which sailed at high speed to keep a schedule in any weather.

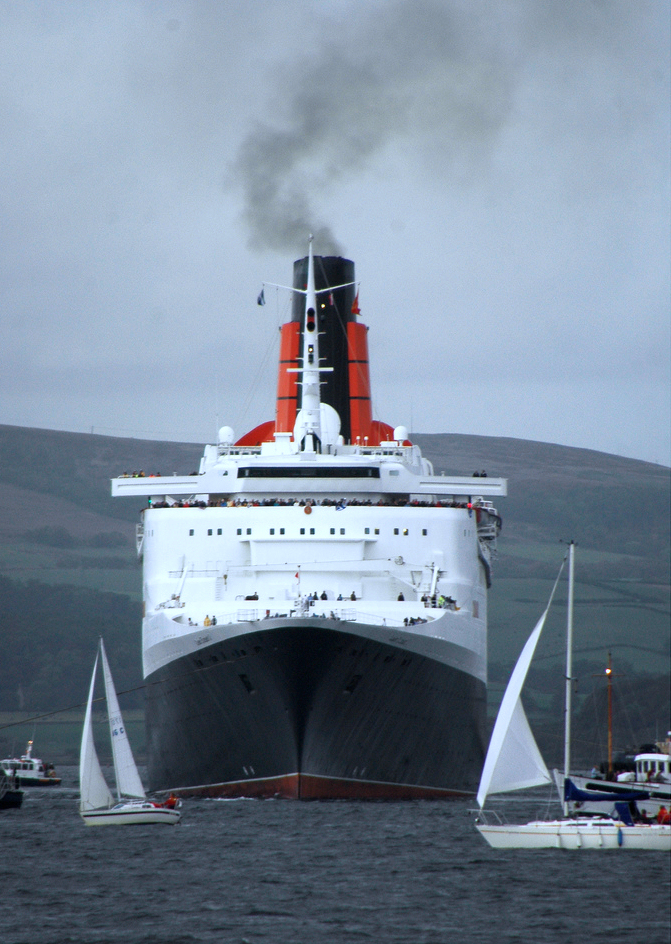
Queen Elizabeth 2 on the River Clyde for her 40th birthday in 2007

The interior and superstructure for Queen Elizabeth 2 was designed by James Gardner. The result was described by The Council of Industrial Design as that of a "very big yacht" and with a "look [that was] sleek, modern and purposeful".

=== Characteristics ===
As built, Queen Elizabeth 2 had a gross tonnage of 65,863 GRT, was 963 ft (294 m) long, and had a top speed of 32.5 knots (60.2 km/h; 37.4 mph) with steam turbines; this was increased to 34 knots (63 km/h; 39 mph) when the vessel was re-engined with the diesel-electric powerplant. At the time of retirement, the ship had a gross tonnage of 70,327.

=== Hull ===
The hull was of welded steel plate construction, which avoided the weight penalty of millions of rivets and the overlapping of hull plating. also fitted was a bulbous bow.

=== Superstructure ===
Like both Normandie and France, QE2 had a flared stem and clean forecastle.

What was controversial at the time was that Cunard decided not to paint the funnel with the line's distinctive colour and pattern, something that had been done on all its merchant vessels since Cunard's first vessel, the RMS Britannia, sailed in 1840. Instead, the funnel was painted white and black, with the Cunard orange-red appearing only on the inside of the wind scoop. This practice ended in 1983 when QE2 returned from service in the Falklands War, and the funnel was repainted in traditional Cunard orange and black, with black horizontal bands, known as "hands".

The original narrow funnel was rebuilt and widened during the 1986 re-engining in Bremerhaven, when the ship was converted from steam to diesel power to allow the new piping for the exhausts for the diesel engines.

Large quantities of weight-saving aluminium were used in the framing and cladding of QE2's superstructure in place of steel. Reducing the draft of the ship lowered fuel consumption, but invited electrochemical corrosion where dissimilar metals are joined, prevented by using a jointing compound. The low melting point of aluminium caused concern when QE2 was serving as a troopship during the Falklands War, with some fearing that if the ship were struck by a missile her upper decks would collapse quickly due to fire.

In 1972, the first penthouse suites were added in an aluminium structure on Signal Deck and Sports Deck (now "Sun Deck"), behind the ship's bridge, and in 1977 this structure was expanded to include more suites with balconies, making QE2 one of the first ships to offer private terraces to passengers since Normandie in the 1930s. Her balcony accommodation was expanded for the final time during the 1986/87 re-engining.

QE2's final structural changes included the reworking of the aft decks during the 1994 refit, following the removal of the magrodome, and the addition of an undercover area on Sun Deck during the 2005 refit outfitted as the Funnel Bar.

=== Interiors ===
Queen Elizabeth 2's interior configuration was originally designed for segregated two-class Atlantic crossings. It was laid out in a horizontal fashion, similar to France, where the spaces dedicated to the two classes were spread on specific decks, in contrast to the deck-spanning vertical class divisions of older liners. Where QE2 differed from France in having only two classes of service, with the upper deck dedicated to tourist class and the quarter deck beneath it to first-class. Each had its own main lounge.

Another modern variation was providing tourist class with a grand two-story main ballroom, called the Double Room (later the Grand Lounge), created by opening a well in the deck between what were to have been the second and third class lounges in the ship's original three class design. This too was unconventional in that it designated a grander space for tourist class passengers than first class, who gathered in the standard height Queen's Room. The First-class was given the theatre balcony on Boat Deck, and tourist class the orchestra level on Upper Deck.

Over the span of her thirty-nine-year career, QE2 received a number of interior refits and alterations.

The year QE2 entered service, 1969, Apollo 11 landed on the Moon, the Concorde prototype was unveiled, and the Boeing 747 first took flight. In keeping with those technology influenced times, Cunard abandoned the Art Deco interiors of the previous Queens in favour of everyday modern materials like laminates, aluminium and Perspex. The public rooms featured glass, stainless steel, dark carpeting and sea green leather. Furniture was modular, and abstract art was used throughout public rooms and cabins.

Dennis Lennon was responsible for co-ordinating the interior design, assisted by Jon Bannenberg and Gaby Schreiber; his original designs only remained intact for three years.

The Midships Lobby on Two Deck, where first-class passengers boarded for transatlantic journeys and all passengers boarded for cruises, was a circular room with a sunken seating area in the centre with green leather-clad banquettes surrounded by a chrome railing. In the centre was a flared, white, trumpet-shaped, lighted column.

The Theatre Bar on Upper Deck featured red chairs, red drapes, a red egg crate fibreglass screen, and even a red baby grand piano. Some more traditional materials like wood veneer were used as highlights throughout the ship, especially in passenger corridors and staterooms. There was also an Observation Bar on Quarter Deck, a successor to its namesake, located in a similar location, on both previous Queens, which offered views through large windows over the ship's bow. Queen Elizabeth 2's 1972 refit plated over the windows and turned the room into galley space.

Almost all of the remaining original decor was replaced in the 1994 refit, with Cunard opting to use the line's traditional ocean liners as inspiration. The green velvet and leather Midships Bar became the Art Deco inspired Chart Room, receiving an original, custom-designed piano from Queen Mary. The (by then) blue dominated Theatre Bar was transformed into the traditional Edwardian-themed Golden Lion Pub.

Some original elements were retained, including the flared columns in the Queen's Room and Mid-Ships Lobby. The Queen's Room's indirect ceiling lighting was replaced with uplighters which reversed the original light airy effect by illuminating the lowered ceiling and leaving shadows in the ceiling's slot.

By the time of QE2's retirement, the ship's synagogue was the only room that had remained unaltered since 1969. However it was reported that during QE2's 22 October five-night voyage, the synagogue was dismantled and removed from the ship before her final sailing to Dubai.

=== Artwork and artefacts ===
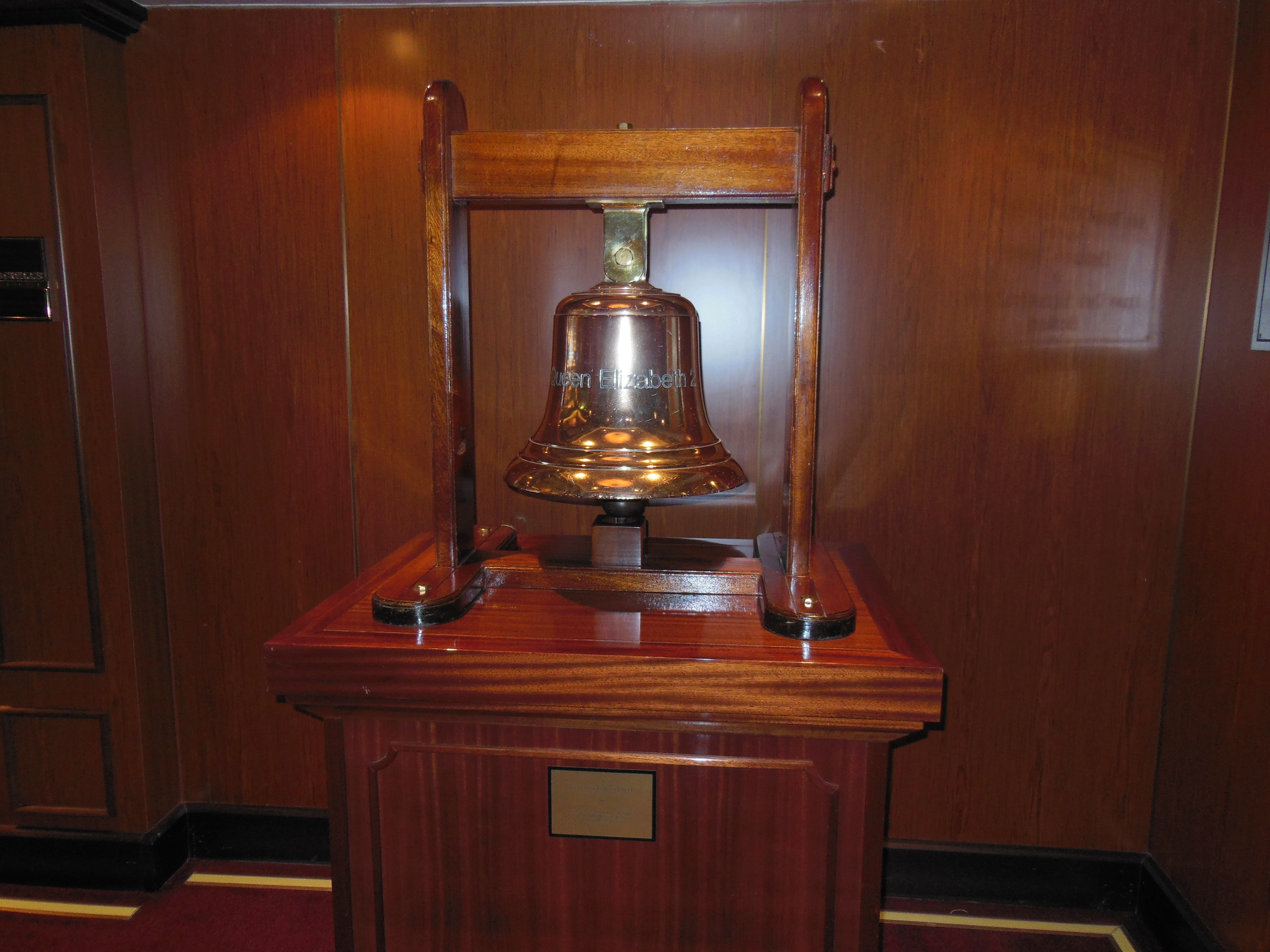
QE2 bell on display on MS Queen Elizabeth

The designers included numerous pieces of artwork within the public rooms of the ship, as well as maritime artefacts drawn from Cunard's long history of operating merchant vessels.

Althea Wynne's sculpture of the White Horses of the Atlantic Ocean was installed in the Mauretania Restaurant. Two bronze busts were installed—one of Sir Samuel Cunard outside the Yacht Club, and one of Queen Elizabeth II in the Queen's Room. Four life-size statues of human forms—created by sculptor Janine Janet in marine materials like shell and coral, representing the four elements—were installed in the Princess Grill. A frieze designed by Brody Nevenshwander, depicting the words of T. S. Eliot, Sir Francis Drake, and John Masefield, was in the Chart Room. The Midships Lobby housed a solid silver model of Queen Elizabeth 2 made by Asprey of Bond Street in 1975, which was lost until a photograph found in 1997 led to the discovery of the model itself. It was placed on Queen Elizabeth 2 in 1999.

Three custom-designed tapestries were commissioned from Helena Hernmarck for the ship's launch, depicting the Queen as well as the launch of the ship. These tapestries were originally hung in the Quarter Deck "D" Stairway, outside the Columbia Restaurant. They were originally made with golden threads, but much of this was lost when they were incorrectly cleaned during the 1987 refit. They were subsequently hung in the "E" stairway and later damaged in 2005.

There are numerous photographs, oils, and pastels of members of the Royal Family throughout the vessel.

The ship also housed items from previous Cunard ships, including both a brass relief plaque with a fish motif from the first RMS Mauretania (1906) and an Art-Deco bas-relief titled Winged Horse and Clouds by Norman Foster from RMS Queen Elizabeth. There were also a vast array of Cunard postcards, porcelain, flatware, boxes, linen, and Lines Bros Tri-ang Minic model ships. One of the key pieces was a replica of the figurehead from Cunard's first ship RMS Britannia, carved from Quebec yellow pine by Cornish sculptor Charles Moore and presented to the ship by Lloyd's of London.

On the Upper Deck sits the silver Boston Commemorative Cup, presented to Britannia by the City of Boston in 1840. This cup was lost for decades until it was found in a pawn shop in Halifax, Nova Scotia. On "2" Deck was a bronze entitled Spirit of the Atlantic that was designed by Barney Seale for the second RMS Mauretania (1938). A large wooden plaque was presented to Queen Elizabeth 2 by First Sea Lord Sir John Fieldhouse to commemorate the ship's service as a Hired Military Transport (HMT) in the Falklands War.

There was also an extensive collection of large-scale models of Cunard ships located throughout Queen Elizabeth 2.

Over the years the ship's collection was added to. Among those items was a set of antique Japanese armour presented to Queen Elizabeth 2 by the Governor of Kagoshima, Japan, during her 1979 world cruise, as was a Wedgwood vase presented to the ship by Lord Wedgwood.

Throughout the public areas were also silver plaques commemorating the visits of every member of the Royal Family, as well as other dignitaries such as South African president Nelson Mandela.

Istithmar acquired most of these items from Cunard when it bought QE2.

=== Crew accommodation ===
Most of the crew were accommodated in two- or four-berth cabins, with showers and heads at the end of each passageway. These were located forward and aft on decks three to six. At the time she entered service, the crew areas were a significant improvement over those aboard RMS Queen Mary and RMS Queen Elizabeth; however the ship's age and the lack of renovation of the crew area during her 40 years of service, in contrast to passenger areas, which were updated periodically, meant that this accommodation was considered basic by the end of her career. Officers were accommodated in single cabins with private in-suite bathrooms located on Sun Deck.

There were six crew bars, the main four were split into the Senior Rates Recreation Rooms on Deck 2 and the Junior Rates on Deck 3, with Deck and Engine Departments on the port side and Hotel on the starboard side of the ship. The Female crew recreation room was on Deck 1 next to their dedicated mess room. Over time the Deck & Engine Ratings Room became The Petty Officers Club and then the Fo'c'sle Club when the British Deck and Engine crew were changed to Filipino crew. The Hotel Senior Rates room became a crew gym. The Junior Rates Rooms on Deck 3 were the main crew bars and were called The Pig & Whistle. ("The 2 deck Pig" and three deck pig, for short and a tradition aboard Cunard ships) and Castaways on the starboard side. After the expansion of female crew following the conversion to diesel power, the female-only recreation and mess room became a crew library and later the crew services office. The final bar on Deck 6 aft was small and in a former crew launderette so it was called the Dhobi Arms, a hang out for the Liverpool crew but was closed in the late '80s. A bar, dedicated for the officers, is located at the forward end of Boat Deck. Named The Officers Wardroom, this area enjoyed forward-facing views and was often opened to passengers for cocktail parties hosted by the senior officers. The crew mess was situated at the forward end of One Deck, adjacent to the crew services office.

=== Machinery ===
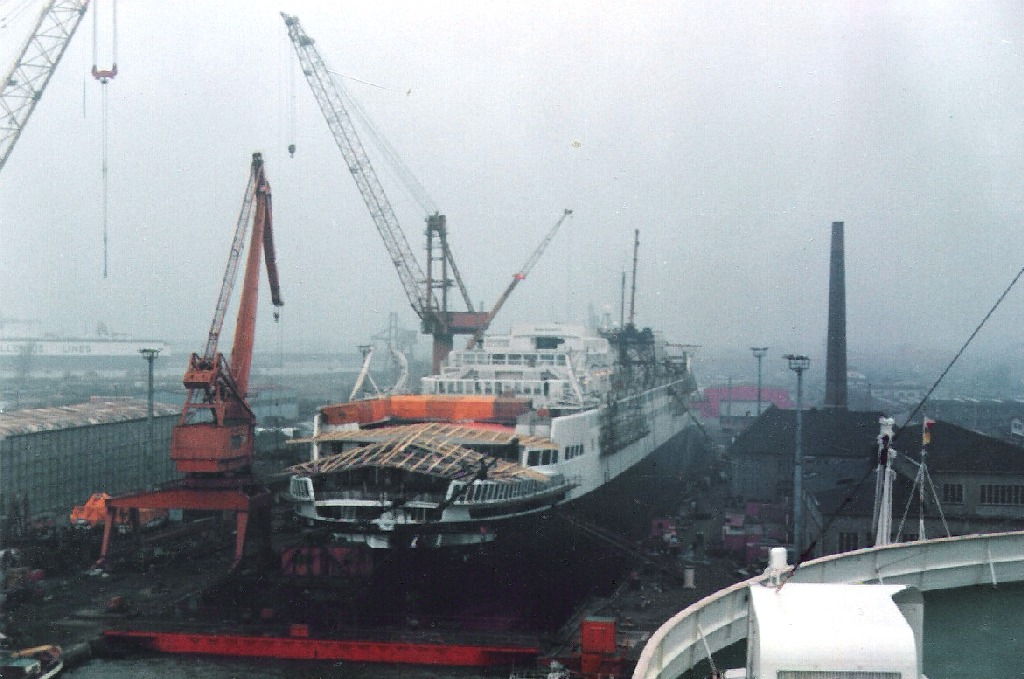
Queen Elizabeth 2 being re-engined at Bremerhaven, November 1986

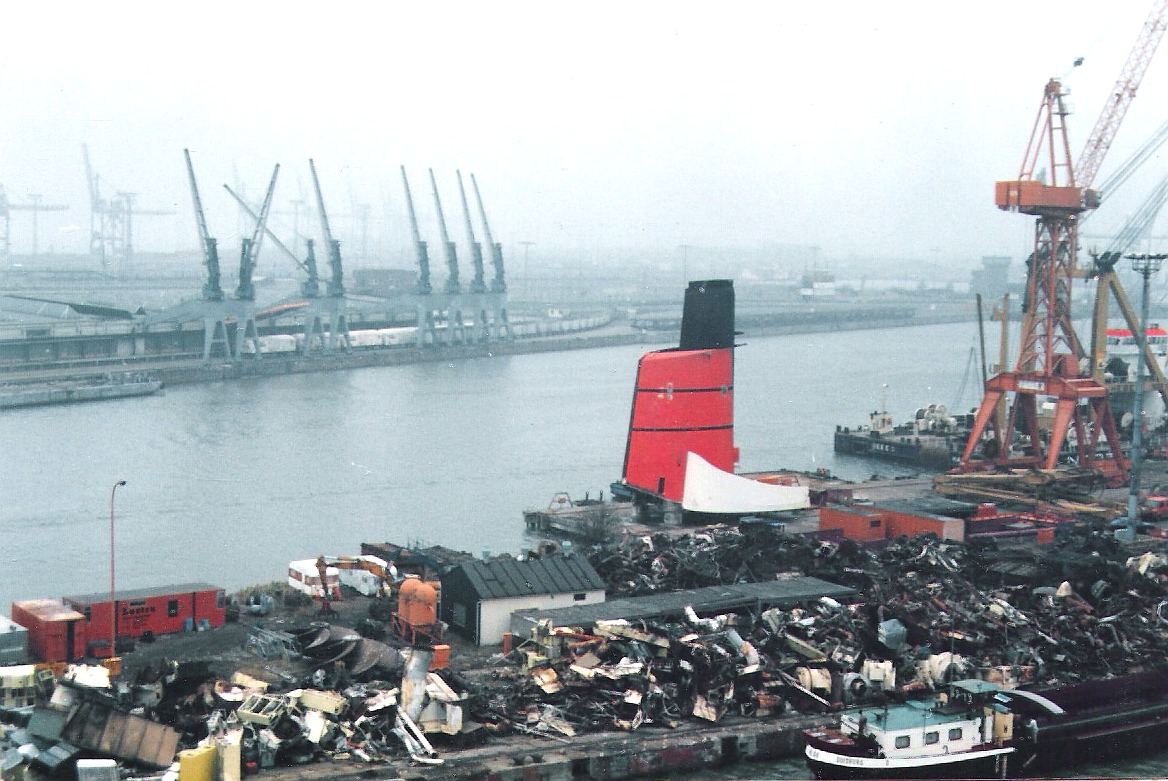
Queen Elizabeth 2's original funnel, removed while being re-engined; some of its panels were recycled to create QE2's new funnel. Her old fixed-pitch propellers are visible in the lower left of the photo.

Queen Elizabeth 2 was originally fitted out with a steam turbine propulsion system using three Foster Wheeler E.S.D II boilers, which provided steam for the two Brown-Parsons turbines. The turbines were rated with a maximum power output figure of 110,000 shaft horsepower (82,000 kW) (normally operating at 94,000 hp or 70,000 kW) and coupled via double-reduction gearing to two six-bladed fixed-pitch propellers.

The steam turbines were plagued with problems from the time the ship first entered service and, despite being technically advanced and fuel-efficient in 1968, her consumption of 600 tons of fuel oil every twenty-four hours was more than expected for such a ship by the 1980s. The ship was originally planned to have a fourth boiler, but this had been omitted to reduce costs. After seventeen years her steam turbines had transported her 2,622,858 miles (2,279,201 nmi; 4,221,081 km) in 18 years. Constant use of the three boilers and machinery led to spare parts often being required, with supply becoming increasingly difficult due to the age of the design of the boilers and turbines.

The shipping company decided that the options were to do nothing for the remainder of the ship's life, re-configure the existing engines, or completely re-engine the vessel with a modern, more efficient and more reliable diesel-electric power plant. Replacement was chosen, calculating that the savings in fuel and maintenance costs would pay for the works within four years and give the vessel at least twenty more years of service, whereas the other, cheaper, options would only provide short-term relief.

During the ship's 1986 to 1987 refit, the steam turbines were removed and replaced with nine German MAN 9L58/64 nine-cylinder, medium-speed diesel engines, each weighing approximately 120 tons. Using a diesel-electric configuration, each engine drove a generator developing 10.5 MW of electrical power at 10,000 volts. This electrical plant, in addition to powering the ship's auxiliary and hotel services through transformers, drove the two main propulsion motors, one on each propeller shaft. These motors produce 44 MW each and are of synchronised salient-pole construction, 30 feet (9 m) in diameter and weighing more than 400 tons each.

The ship's service speed of 28.5 knots (52.8 km/h) could now be maintained using only seven of the nine diesel-electric sets. The maximum power output with the new engine configuration running increased from 110,000 hp to 130,000 hp. During the re-engining the ship's funnel was widened to accommodate the exhaust pipes for the nine engines.

During the refit, the original fixed-pitch propellers were replaced with variable-pitch propellers. The original steam propulsion system required astern turbines to stop the ship or move her backwards, but the pitch of the new blades could be reversed to reverse the direction of propeller thrust without changing the direction of rotation, providing shorter stopping times and improved handling.

The new propellers were originally fitted with "Grim Wheels", named after their inventor, Otto Grim. These were free-spinning blades fitted behind the main propellers, with long vanes protruding from the centre hub, which recovered lost propeller thrust and reduced fuel consumption by 2.5 to 3%. After the trial of these wheels, when the ship was drydocked, the majority of the vanes on each wheel were discovered to have broken off. The wheels were removed and the project was abandoned.

Other machinery includes nine heat recovery boilers, coupled with two oil-fired boilers to produce steam for heating fuel, domestic water, swimming pools, laundry equipment, and galley food preparation. Four flash evaporators and a reverse-osmosis unit desalinate seawater to produce 1000 tons of freshwater daily. There is also a sanitation system and sewage disposal plant, air conditioning plant, and an electro-hydraulic steering system.

== Construction ==
On 30 December 1964, Cunard placed an order for construction of the new ship with John Brown & Company, who would build it at their shipyard in Clydebank, Scotland. The agreed price was £25,427,000 (equal to £450,296,301 today) provision for escalation of labour and materials increases, with an agreed delivery date of May 1968. To assist with its construction the British government provided financial assistance to Cunard in the form of a £17.6 million loan at 4.5% interest.

The keel was laid down on 5 July 1965, as hull number 736 on the same slipway where previous Cunard liners such as Lusitania, Aquitania, Queen Mary, and Queen Elizabeth had been constructed. The ship was launched and named on 20 September 1967 by Queen Elizabeth II, using the same pair of gold scissors her mother and grandmother used to launch Queen Elizabeth and Queen Mary, respectively.

=== Launch ===
As was Cunard practice at the time, the name of the liner was not publicly revealed until the launch. Dignitaries were invited to the "Launch of Cunard Liner No. 736", as no name had yet been painted on the bow.

The Queen launched the ship with the words "I name this ship Queen Elizabeth the Second," the normal short form of address of the monarch, Elizabeth II herself. The following day, the New York Times and The Times of London printed the name as Queen Elizabeth II, the short form of written style of the monarch. However, when the liner left the shipyard in 1968 she bore the name Queen Elizabeth 2 on her bow, and has continued to do so ever since.

Ronald Warwick, the son of William "Bil" Warwick and the first master of QE2, Warwick junior (himself later in his Cunard career a of Queen Elizabeth 2) supports the account that the Queen initiated the surprise move of naming the liner after herself rather than simply Queen Elizabeth as had originally been planned (the name having been made vacant by the retirement of the current liner before the new one was commissioned). The name had been given to the Queen in a sealed envelope which she didn't open. The book, referencing his autobiography, states that the Cunard chairman Sir Basil Smallpeice was delighted with this development, it being in keeping with the previous Queen liners, and the 2 was added by Cunard for differentiation of the ship while still denoting it was named after the Queen.

Other later accounts repeat the position that Cunard originally intended to name the ship Queen Elizabeth and the addition of a 2 by the Queen was a surprise to Cunard, in 1990 and 2008, although two books by William H. Miller state that Queen Elizabeth 2 was the name agreed on before the launch between Cunard officials and the Queen.

Accounts that repeat the position that QE2 was not named after the reigning monarch have been published in 1991, 1999, 2004, 2005, and 2008. In 2008, The Daily Telegraph goes further to state the ship is named not only as the second ship named Queen Elizabeth, but is specifically named after the wife of King George VI.

=== Delivery ===
As construction continued on the new ship, Cunard found itself in increasing financial difficulties as increased competition from airlines resulted in the company's passenger ships losing money. With profits from its cargo ships eventually unable to offset the losses, Cunard was forced to sell Mauretania, Sylvania, Carinthia, Caronia, Queen Mary and Queen Elizabeth between 1965 and 1968. Income also fell due to a seven-week-long seamens' strike in 1966. Then John Brown advised that the delivery would be delayed by six months, which meant the ship would miss the 1968 peak summer transatlantic season. Following market research, Cunard decided to take advantage of the delay to change the original three-class configuration of the ship to a more flexible two-class arrangement of First and Tourist.

On 20 September 1967 with the launch date approaching, Cunard (having lost £7.5 million the previous year) approached the government with a request for an additional £3 million loan to complete the ship. Eventually the government agreed to increase the original £17.6 million loan up to £24 million.

On 19 November 1968, she left John Brown's fitting-out berth. Several industrial disputes with the Clydebank workers, with their resultant delays and quality issues, forced Cunard to transfer the ship to Southampton, where Vosper Thorneycroft completed the installation and commissioning work, prior to the sea trials.

Sea trials began on 26 November 1968 in the Irish Sea, proceeding to speed trials off the Isle of Arran.

Cunard initially refused to accept the ship, as the sea trials identified that the ship suffered from a resonant vibration which was traced to a design flaw in the blades of the steam turbines. This delayed her being handed over to her new owners until 18 April 1969. She then departed on a "shakedown cruise" to Las Palmas on 22 April 1969.

== Service ==
=== Early career ===
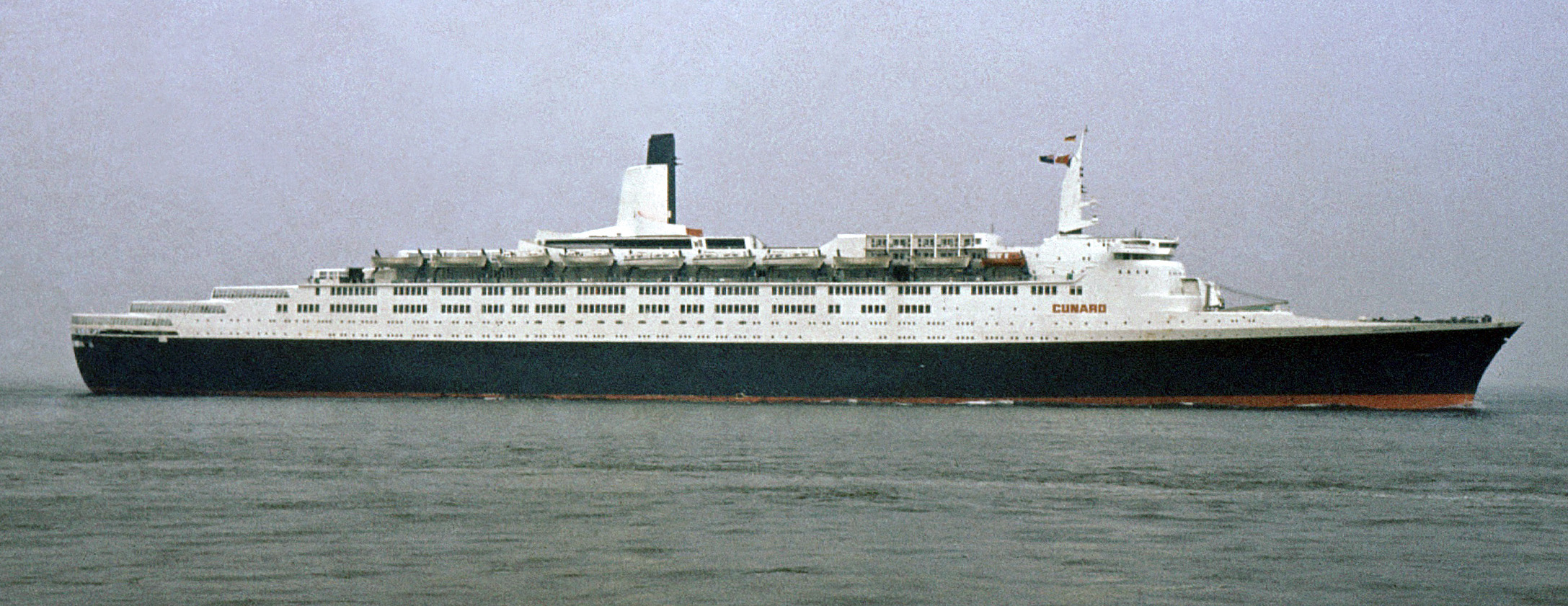
Queen Elizabeth 2 in Cuxhaven, West Germany, in 1973

Queen Elizabeth 2's maiden voyage, from Southampton to New York, commenced on 2 May 1969, taking 4 days, 16 hours, and 35 minutes, at an average speed of 28.02 knots. Upon her arrival to New York Harbour, she was greeted by two Royal Air Force Harrier jets that hovered on each side of the ship. The Harriers were in New York City at the time competing in the Daily Mail Trans-Atlantic Air Race.

In the early 1970s, she was used to smuggle weapons by the Provisional Irish Republican Army.

In 1971, she participated in the rescue of some 500 passengers from the burning French Line ship Antilles. Later that year on 5 March QE2 was disabled for four hours when jellyfish were sucked into and blocked her seawater intakes.

On 17 May 1972, while travelling from New York to Southampton, she was the subject of a bomb threat. She was searched by her crew, and a combined Special Air Service and Special Boat Service team which parachuted into the sea to conduct a search of the ship. No bomb was found, but the hoaxer was arrested by the FBI.

The following year QE2 undertook two chartered cruises through the Mediterranean to Israel in commemoration of the 25th anniversary of the state's founding. The ship's Columbia Restaurant was koshered for Passover, and Jewish passengers were able to celebrate Passover on the ship. According to the book "The Angel" by Uri Bar-Joseph, Muammar Gaddafi ordered a submarine to torpedo her during one of the chartered cruises in retaliation for Israel's downing of Libyan Flight 114, but Anwar Sadat intervened secretly to foil the attack.

On 1 April 1974, the ship suffered power failure due to boiler trouble on a cruise from New York to Puerto Rico and the Virgin Islands. Passengers were transferred on to the Sea Venture to Bermuda. Among the passengers on board were Kansas City Chiefs head coach Hank Stram and Sonny Jurgensen of the Washington Redskins, attending a football themed cruise.

She continued the Cunard tradition of regular scheduled transatlantic crossings every year of her service life, crossing on an opposite and symbiotic summer schedule with the CGT's famous SS France (1960) between 1961 and 1974. Upon the withdrawal of competing SS France from service in 1974, QE2 became the largest operational passenger ship in the world for a few years, until France was returned to service as SS Norway in 1980.

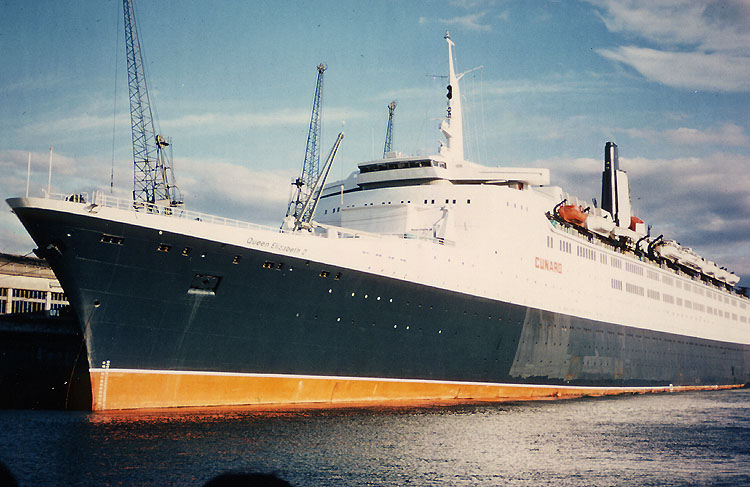
QE2 in Southampton, 1976

On 23 July 1976 while the ship was 80 miles off the Scilly Isles on a transatlantic voyage, a flexible coupling drive connecting the starboard main engine high-pressure rotor and the reduction gearbox ruptured. This allowed lubricating oil under pressure to enter into the main engine room where it ignited, creating a severe fire. It took 20 minutes to bring the fire under control. Reduced to two boilers, QE2 limped back to Southampton. Damage from the fire resulted in a replacement boiler having to be fitted by dry-docking the ship and cutting an access hole in her side.

By 1978 QE2 was breaking even with an occupancy of 65%, generating revenues of greater than £30 million per year against which had to be deducted an annual fuel cost of £5 million and a monthly crew cost of £225,000. With it costing £80,000 a day for her to sit idle in port, her owners made every attempt to keep her at sea and full of passengers. As a result, as much maintenance as possible was undertaken while at sea. However, she needed all three of her boilers to be in service if she was to maintain her transatlantic schedule. With limited ability to maintain her boilers, reliability was becoming a serious issue.

Between the late 1970s and early 1980s, the ship was testing a new ablative anti-fouling type paint for the Admiralty which was only available in blue. When they finally made the paint available in different colours they returned QE2 anti-fouling paint to the traditional red colour.

=== Falklands War ===
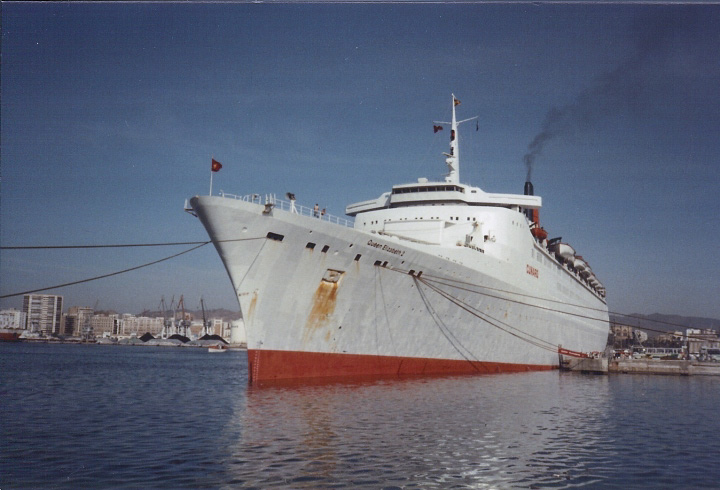
Berthed in Málaga, Spain, 1982, with her original white funnel repainted red. Her hull is painted grey, a short-lived decision.

On 3 May 1982, she was requisitioned by the British government for service as a troop carrier in the Falklands War.

In preparation for war service, Vosper Thornycroft commenced in Southampton on 5 May 1982 the installation of two helicopter pads, the transformation of public lounges into dormitories, the installation of fuel pipes that ran through the ship down to the engine room to allow for refuelling at sea, and the covering of carpets with 2,000 sheets of hardboard. A quarter of the ship's length was reinforced with steel plating, and an anti-magnetic coil was fitted to combat naval mines. Over 650 Cunard crew members volunteered for the voyage, to look after the 3,000 members of the Fifth Infantry Brigade, which the ship transported to South Georgia.

On 12 May 1982, with only one of her three boilers in operation, the ship departed Southampton for the South Atlantic, carrying 3,000 troops and 650 volunteer crew. The remaining boilers were brought back into service as she steamed south.

During the voyage, the ship was blacked out and the radar switched off to avoid detection, steaming on without modern aids.

QE2 returned to the UK on 11 June 1982, where she was greeted in Southampton Water by Queen Elizabeth The Queen Mother on board HMY Britannia. Peter Jackson, the captain of the ocean liner, responded to the Queen Mother's welcome: "Please convey to Her Majesty Queen Elizabeth our thanks for her kind message. Cunard's Queen Elizabeth 2 is proud to have been of service to Her Majesty's Forces." The ship underwent conversion back to passenger service, with her funnel being painted in the traditional Cunard orange with black stripes, which are known as "hands", for the first time, during the refit the hull's exterior a decision was made to repaint the hull in a light pebble grey. The ship returned to service on 7 August 1982.

The new colour scheme proved unpopular with passengers, as well as difficult to maintain, so the hull reverted to traditional colours in 1983. Later that year, QE2 was fitted with a magrodome over her quarterdeck pool.

=== Diesel era and Project Lifestyle ===
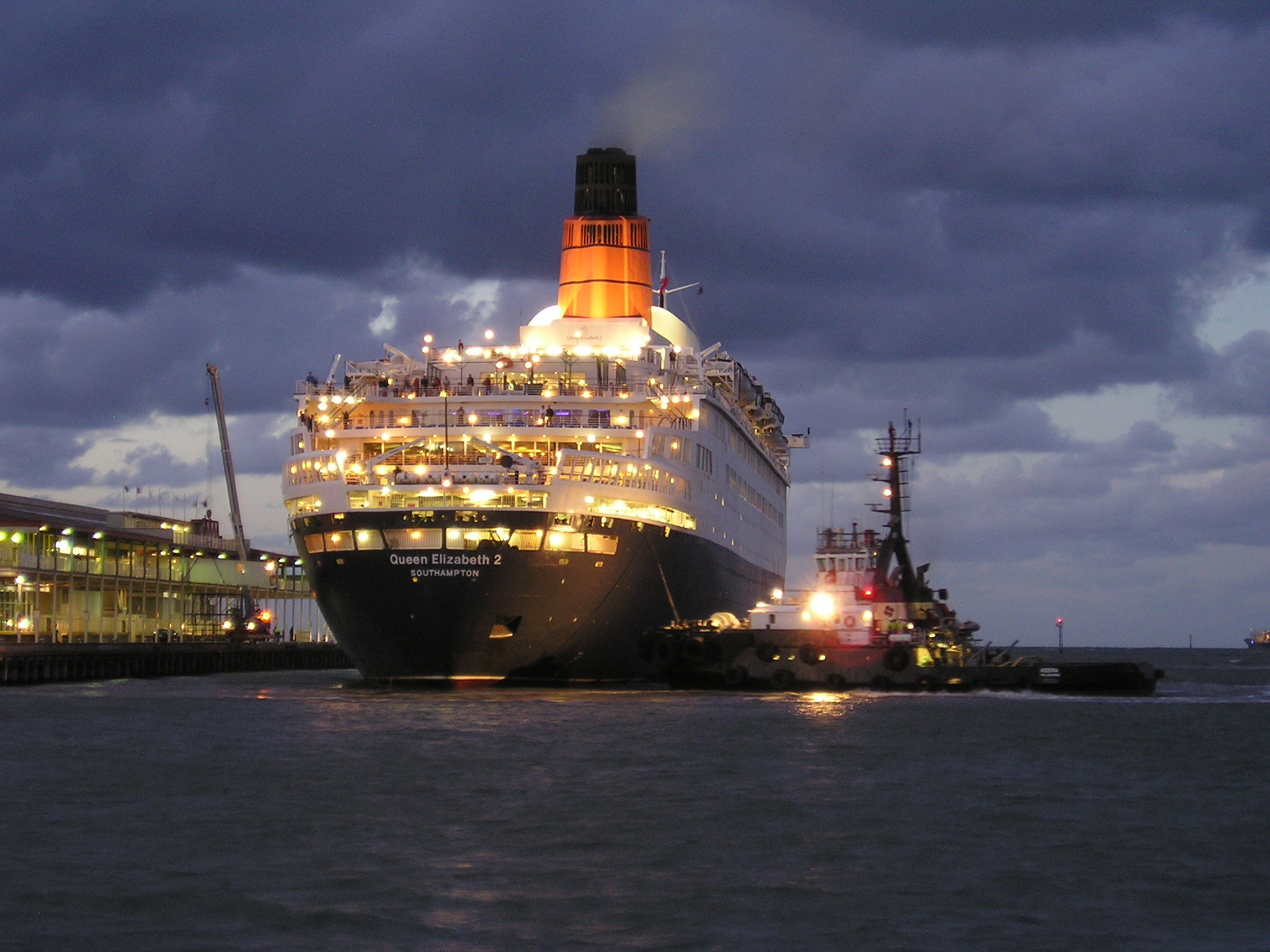
A new and wider funnel was installed in her 1986-87 refit to handle conversion from steam to diesel power. Moored in Melbourne 2008.

QE2 once again experienced mechanical problems following her annual overhaul in November 1983. Boiler problems caused Cunard to cancel a cruise, and, in October 1984, an electrical fire caused a complete loss of power. The ship was delayed for several days before power could be restored. Instead of replacing QE2 with a newer vessel, Cunard decided that it was more prudent to simply make improvements to her. Therefore, from 27 October 1986 to 25 April 1987, QE2 underwent one of her most significant refurbishments when she was converted by Lloyd Werft at their shipyard in Bremerhaven, Germany from steam power to diesel. Nine MAN B&W diesel-electric engines, new propellers and a heat recovery system (to use heat expelled by the engines) were fitted, which halved the fuel consumption. With this new propulsion system, QE2 was expected to serve another 20 years with Cunard. The passenger accommodation was also modernised. The refurbishment cost over £100 million.

On 7 August 1992, the underside of the hull was extensively damaged when she ran aground south of Cuttyhunk Island near Martha's Vineyard, while returning from a five-day cruise to Halifax, Nova Scotia along the east coast of the United States and Canada. A combination of her speed, an uncharted shoal, overestimating the height of tide and underestimating the increase in the ship's draft due to the effect of squat led to the ship's hull scraping rocks on the ocean floor. The accident resulted in the passengers disembarking earlier than scheduled at nearby Newport, Rhode Island, and the ship being taken out of service while temporary repairs were made in drydock at Boston. Several days later, divers found the red paint from the keel on previously uncharted rocks where the ship struck the bottom.

By the mid-1990s, it was decided that QE2 was due for a new look and in 1994 the ship was given a multimillion-pound refurbishment in Hamburg code-named Project Lifestyle.

On 11 September 1995, QE2 encountered a rogue wave, estimated at 90 ft (27 m), caused by Hurricane Luis in the North Atlantic Ocean about 200 miles (320 km) south of eastern Newfoundland. One year later, during her twentieth world cruise, she completed her four millionth mile. The ship had sailed the equivalent of 185 times around the planet.

QE2 celebrated the 30th anniversary of her maiden voyage in Southampton in 1999. In three decades she had 1,159 voyages, sailed 4,648,050 nautical miles (5,348,880 mi; 8,608,190 km) and carried over two million passengers.

=== Later years ===
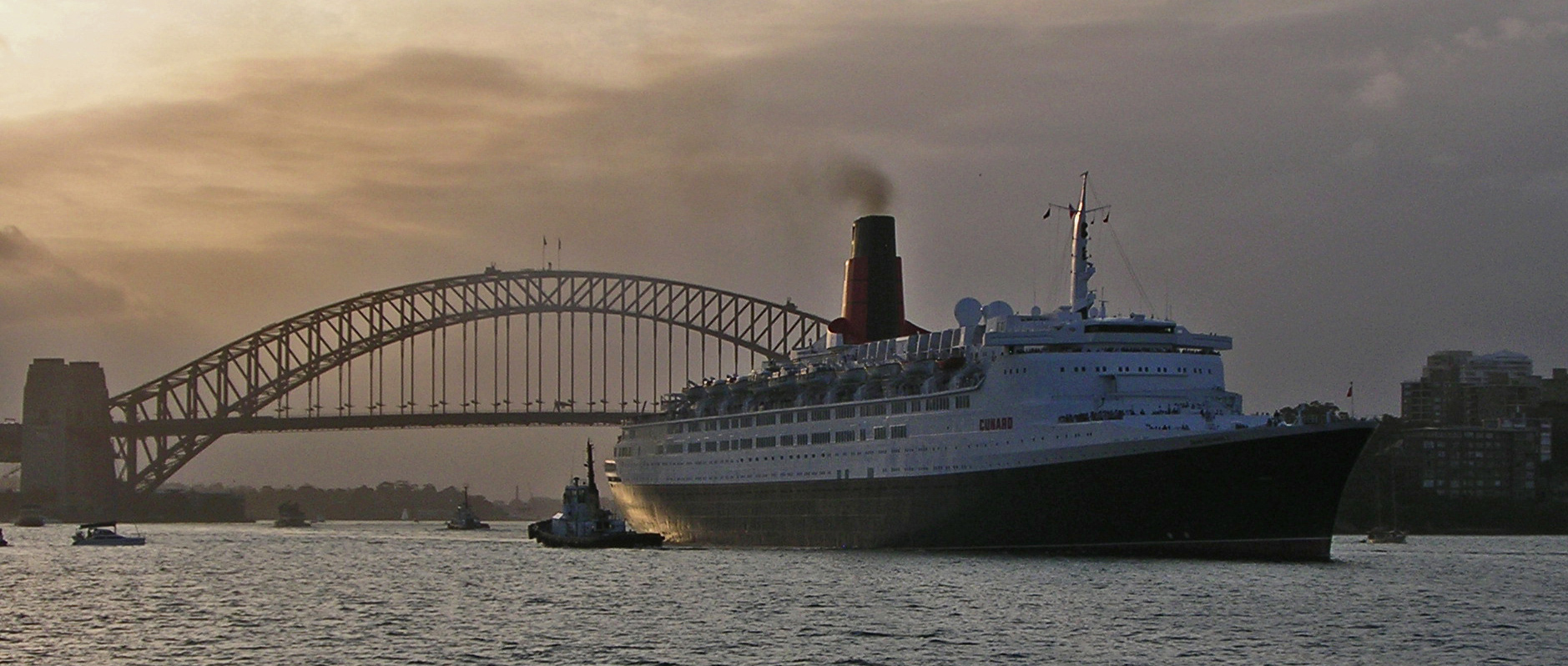
Leaving Sydney 18 February 2004

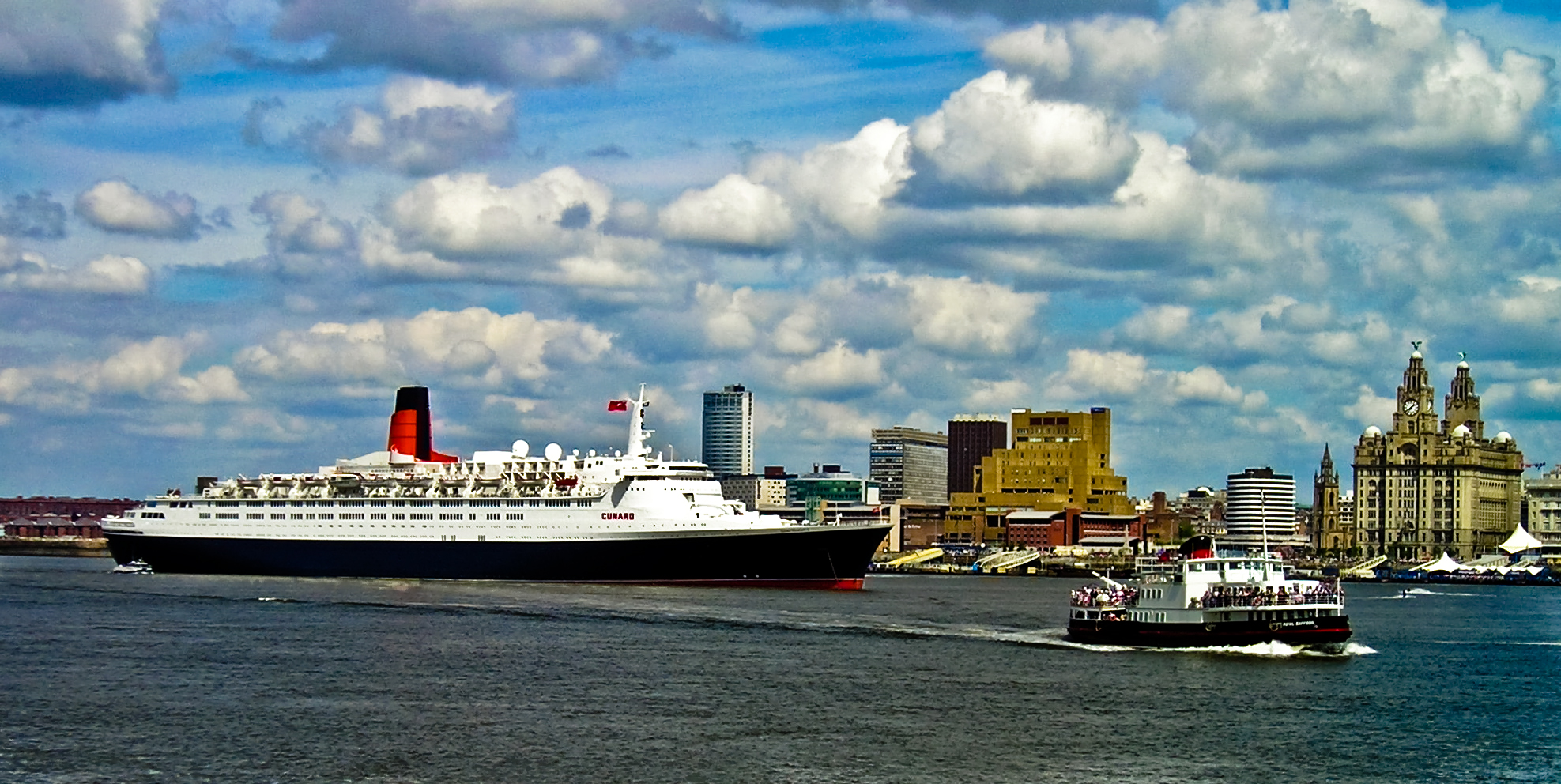
QE2 near the Cunard Building in Liverpool in 2004

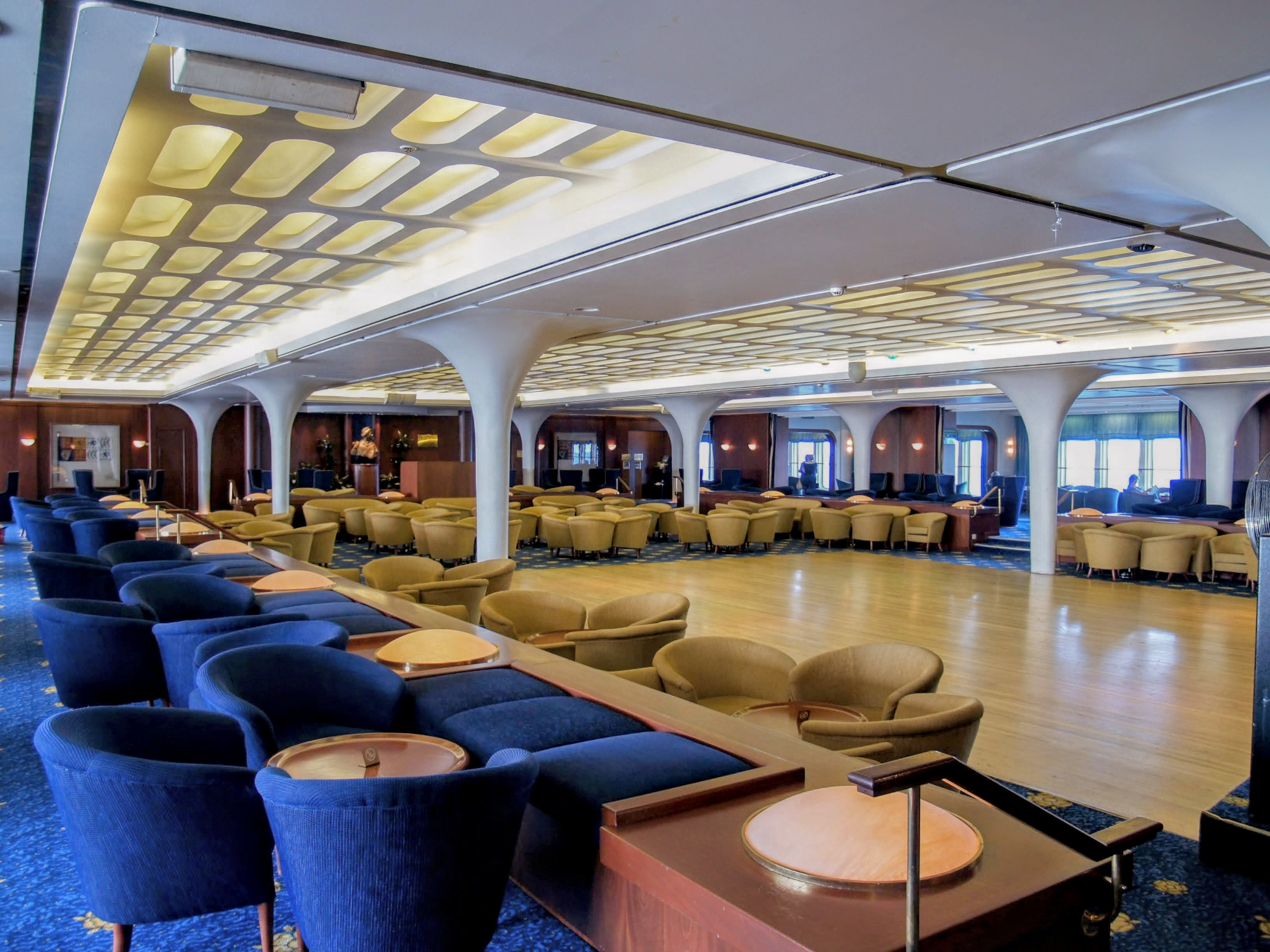
The interior Queens Room in 2006

Following the 1998 acquisition of the Cunard Line by Carnival Corporation, in 1999 QE2 was given a US$30 million refurbishment which included refreshing various public rooms, and a new colour palette in the passenger cabins. The Royal Promenade, which formerly housed upscale shops such as Burberry, H. Stern and Aquascutum, were replaced by boutiques typical of cruise ships, selling perfumes, watches and logo items. During this refit, the hull was stripped to bare metal, and the ship repainted in the traditional Cunard colours of matte black (Federal Grey) with a white superstructure.

On 29 August 2002, Queen Elizabeth 2 became the first merchant ship to sail more than 5 million nautical miles at sea.

In 2004, the vessel stopped plying the traditional transatlantic route and began full-time cruising, the transatlantic route having been assigned to Cunard's new flagship, Queen Mary 2. However, Queen Elizabeth 2 still undertook an annual world cruise and regular trips around the Mediterranean. By this time, she lacked the amenities to rival newer, larger cruise ships, but she still had unique features such as her ballrooms, hospital, and 6,000-book library. QE2 remained the fastest cruise ship afloat (28.5 knots), with fuel economy at this speed at 49.5 ft to the gallon (4 m/L). While cruising at slower speeds efficiency was improved to 125 ft per gallon (10 m/L).

On 5 November 2004, Queen Elizabeth 2 became Cunard's longest serving express liner, surpassing RMS Aquitania's 35 years, while on 4 September 2005, during a call to the port of Sydney, Nova Scotia, QE2 became the longest serving Cunarder, surpassing RMS Scythia's record.

==== Retirement announcement ====
On 18 June 2007, Cunard announced that QE2 had been bought by the Dubai investment company Istithmar for $100 million. Her retirement, in part, was forced by the oncoming June 2010 implementation of the International Convention for the Safety of Life at Sea (SOLAS) regulations, which would have forced large and expensive structural changes to the ship.

=== Retirement and final Cunard voyage ===
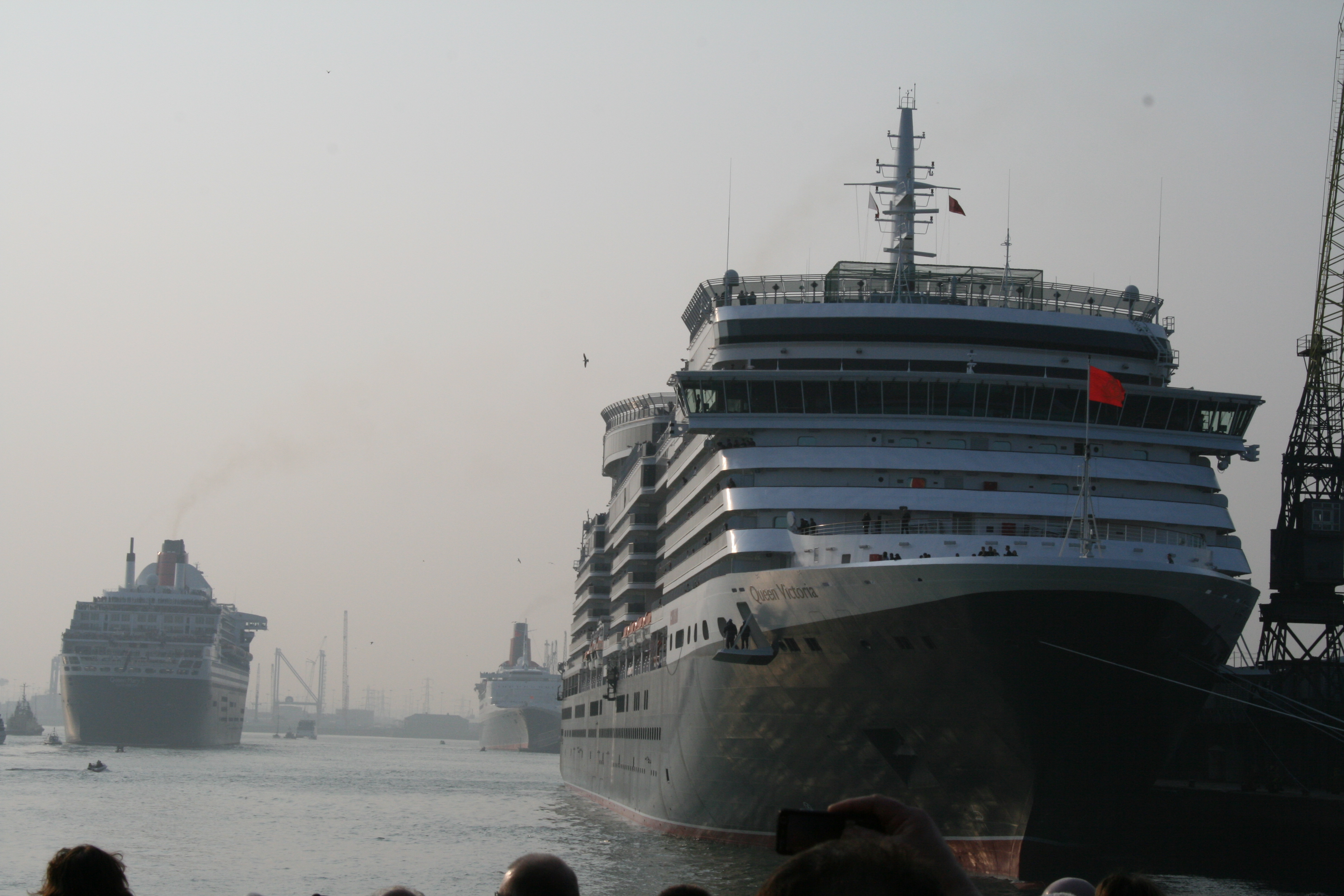
QM2 (left) next to QE2 (right) with QV in the foreground

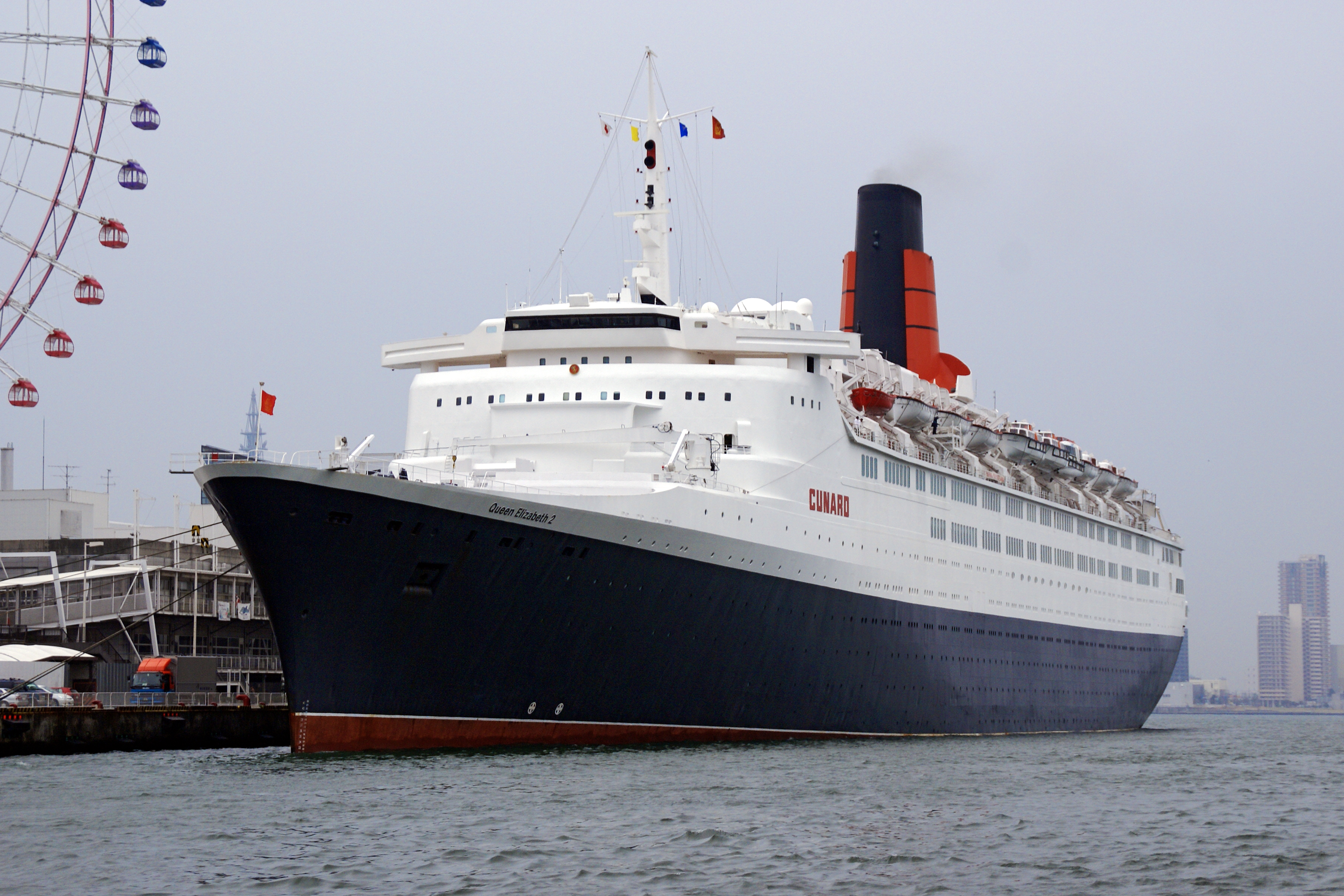
QE2 berthed in Osaka on 19 March 2008

On 3 October 2008, QE2 set off from Cork for Douglas Bay on her farewell tour of Ireland and Britain, before heading for Liverpool. She left Liverpool and arrived in Belfast on 4 October 2008, before moving to Greenock the next day (the ship's height with funnel makes it impossible to pass under the Erskine Bridge so Clydebank is not reachable). There she was escorted by Royal Navy destroyer HMS Manchester and visited by MV Balmoral. The farewell was viewed by large crowds and concluded with a firework display. QE2 then sailed around Scotland to the Firth of Forth on 7 October 2008, where she anchored in the shadow of the Forth Bridge. The next day, following an RAF flypast, she left amidst a flotilla of small craft to head to Newcastle upon Tyne, before returning to Southampton.

==== Final transatlantic crossings ====
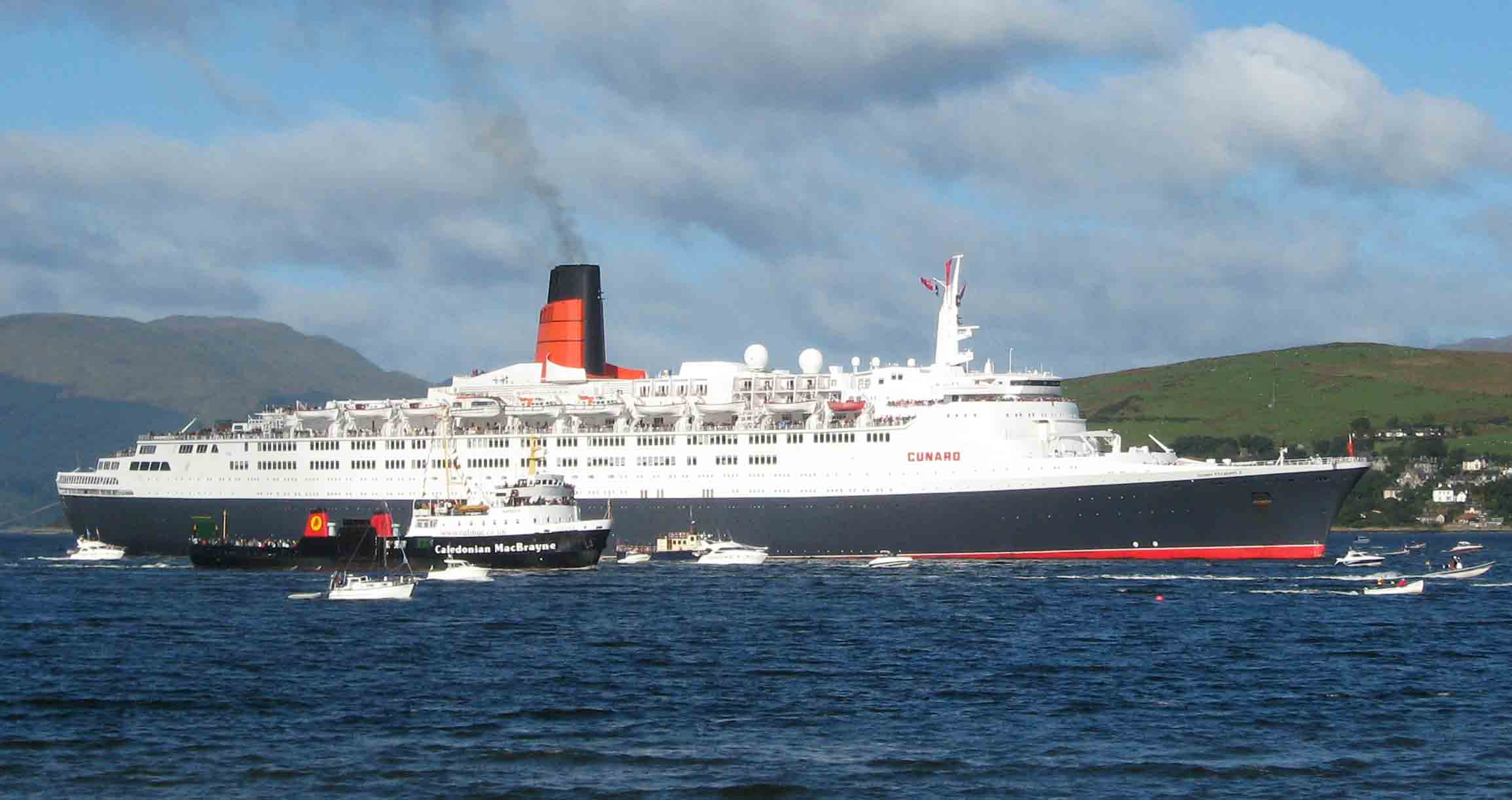
Farewell to the Clyde

QE2 completed her final Atlantic crossings in tandem with her successor, QM2. The ships departed for the final westbound crossing from Southampton on 10 October, sailing tandem and arriving in New York City one final time on 16 October. The Queen Mary 2 docked at the Brooklyn cruise terminal, while the QE2 docked in Manhattan. The two liners departed New York on 16 October for the final eastbound crossing, arriving in Southampton on 22 October. This was the end of QE2's transatlantic voyages.

==== Final voyage ====
On her final arrival into Southampton, QE2 (on 11 November 2008, with 1,700 passengers and 1,000 crew on board) ran aground in the Solent near the Southampton Water.

Once safely back at her berth, preparations continued for her farewell celebrations. These were led by Prince Philip, Duke of Edinburgh who toured the ship at great length. He visited areas of interest including the Engine Control Room. He also met with current and former crew members. During this time, divers were sent down to inspect the hull for any possible damage caused by the vessel's earlier mishap – none was found.

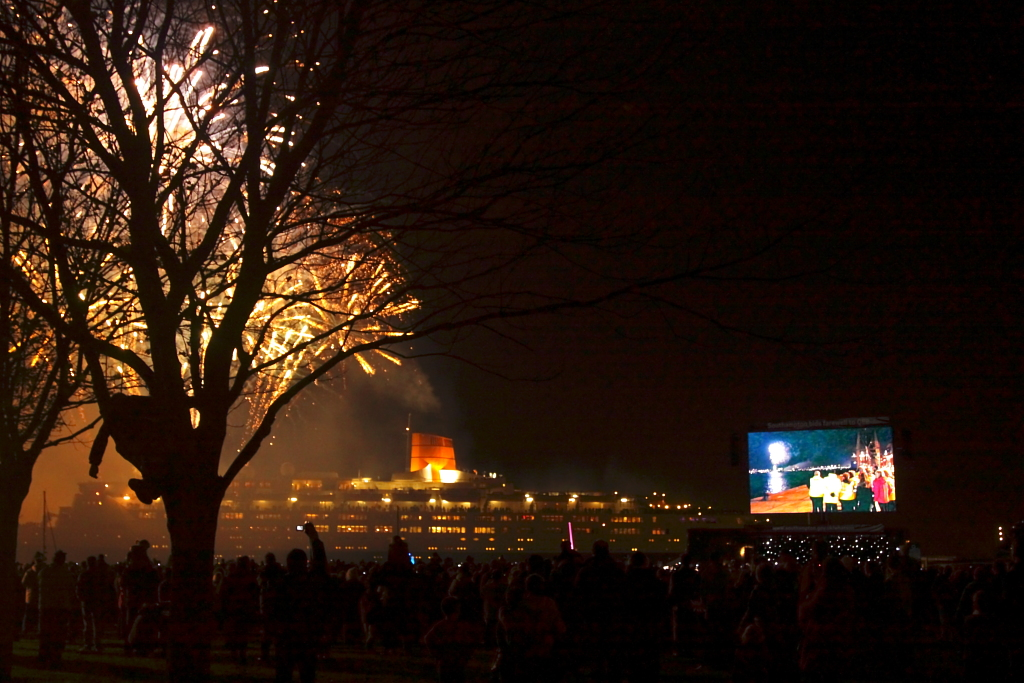
Southampton, 11 November 2008

Queen Elizabeth 2 left Southampton Docks for the final time on 11 November 2008, to begin her farewell voyage by the name of "QE2's Final Voyage". After purchasing her for US$100 million her ownership passed to Nakheel Properties, a company of Dubai World, on 26 November. The decommissioning of the ship was particularly poignant for Queen Elizabeth 2's only permanent resident, Beatrice Muller, aged 89, who lived on board in retirement for nine years, at a cost of some £3,500 (~€4,300, ~$5,400) per month.

At the time of her retirement, QE2 had sailed 5.8 million nautical miles, carried close to 3 million passengers and completed 806 transatlantic crossings, plus 26 world cruises.

== Layup ==
=== Arrival and early proposals (2008–2010) ===
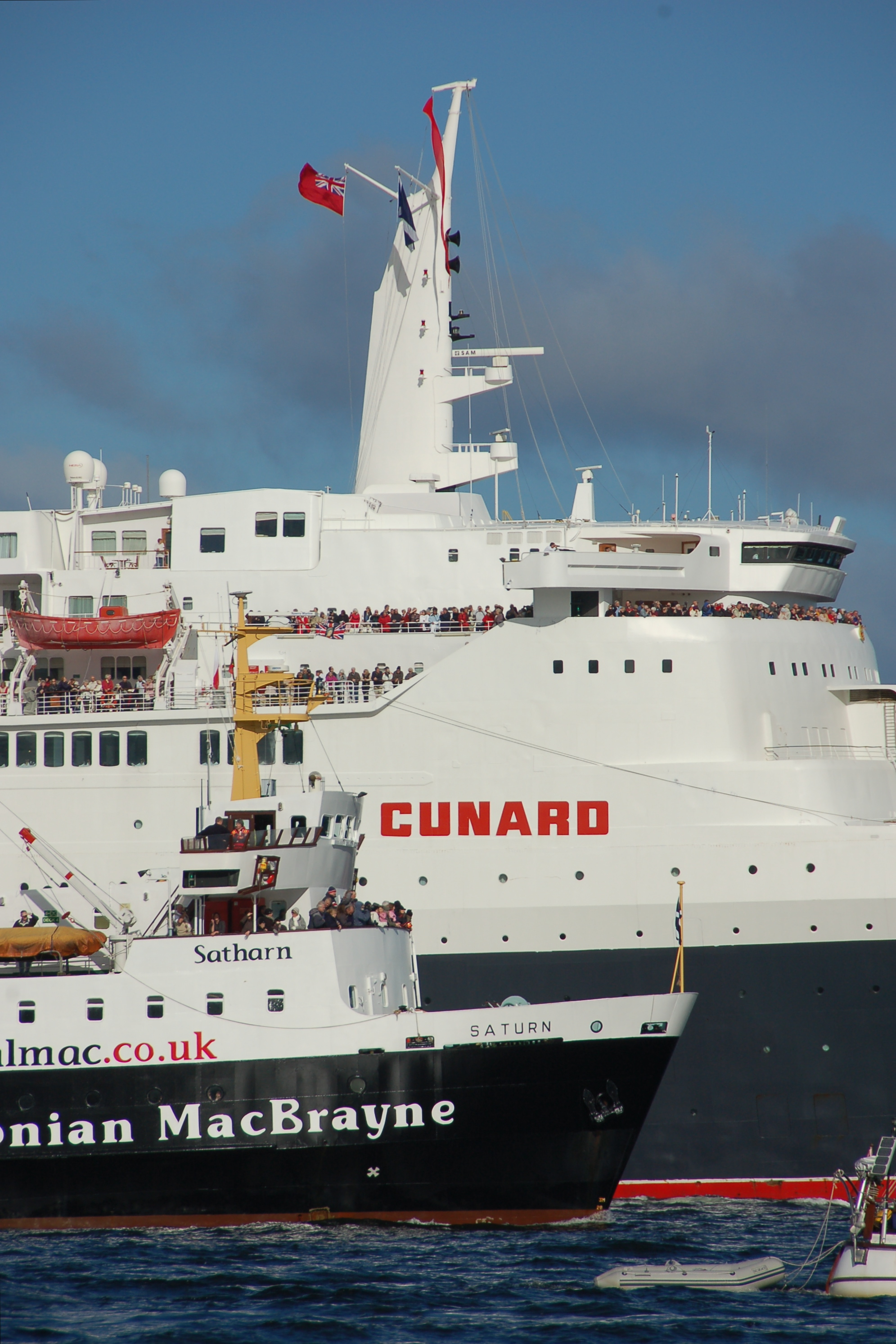
QE2 with her paying-off pennant flying

Her final voyage from Southampton to Dubai under the command of Captain Ian McNaught began on 11 November 2008, arriving on 26 November in a flotilla of 60 smaller vessels, led by MY Dubai, the personal yacht of Sheikh Mohammed, ruler of Dubai, in time for her official handover the following day.

She was greeted with a fly-past from an Emirates Airbus A380 jet and a huge fireworks display, while thousands of people gathered at the Mina Rashid, waving the flags of the United Kingdom and the United Arab Emirates. Since her arrival in Dubai QE2 remained moored at Port Rashid. Shortly after her final passengers were disembarked, she was moved forward to the cargo area of the port, to free up the passenger terminal for other cruise vessels.

She was expected to be refurbished and berthed permanently at Nakheel's Palm Jumeirah as "a luxury floating hotel, retail, museum and entertainment destination." The refurbishment planned to see Queen Elizabeth 2 transformed into a tourist destination in Dubai; however, due to the 2008 financial crisis, QE2 remained moored at Port Rashid awaiting a decision about her future.

QE2 remained an oceangoing vessel at this time, and as such, former Captain Ronald Warwick of QE2 and Queen Mary 2 (QM2) and retired commodore of the Cunard Line was initially employed by V-Ships, who managed QE2 post the Cunard handed her over as the vessel's legal master, but was replaced by other V-Ships captains over time as the ship remained idle.

It was anticipated that QE2 would be moved to the Dubai Drydocks sometime in 2009 to begin a series of far-reaching refurbishments which would result in a conversion into a floating hotel.

Due to the 2008 financial crisis and the Great Recession, it was rumoured that QE2's refurbishment and hotel conversion would not take place and that the ship would be resold. These rumours resulted in the owners, Istithmar, issuing a series of press releases stating that plans for QE2's conversion were ongoing, with no intention to sell. However, since arriving in Dubai the only visible exterior change to QE2 was the painting out of the Cunard titles from the ship's superstructure.

QE2 was joined in Mina Rashid by QM2 on 21 March 2009 while QM2 visited Dubai as part of her 2009 world cruise. She was joined once again by Queen Victoria (QV) on 29 March 2009 as a part of her 2009 world cruise. QM2 and QV again visited QE2 in 2010 and on 31 March 2011 the new Queen Elizabeth (QE) called at Dubai during her maiden world cruise – photos were arranged by Cunard to capture the occasion. QM2 called in Dubai two days after QE left.

In April 2009, a supposed concept model of the post-refurbishment Hotel QE2 was shown for sale on an online auction website. The model depicted a much altered QE2.

In June 2009, the Southampton Daily Echo reported that Queen Elizabeth 2 would return to the UK as an operating cruise ship. On 10 July 2009, it was revealed that QE2 might sail to Cape Town, South Africa, to become a floating hotel for use primarily during the 2010 FIFA World Cup, in a Dubai World sponsored venture at the V&A Waterfront. This was confirmed by Nakheel on 20 July 2009. In preparation for this expected voyage the ship was placed into the Dubai Drydock and underwent an extensive exterior refurbishment. During this refit, the ship's underwater hull was repainted and inspected. Shortly after the refit, QE2 was registered under the flag of Vanuatu, and Port Vila was painted on her stern, replacing Southampton. QE2 returned to Port Rashid, where it was anticipated she would soon sail for Cape Town. The arrival of QE2 in Cape Town was expected to create many local jobs including hotel staff, restaurant staff, chefs, cleaners and shop attendants, all being sourced from the local workforce. But, in January 2010, it was confirmed that QE2 would not be moved to Cape Town.

=== Sale and relocation speculation (2010–2012) ===
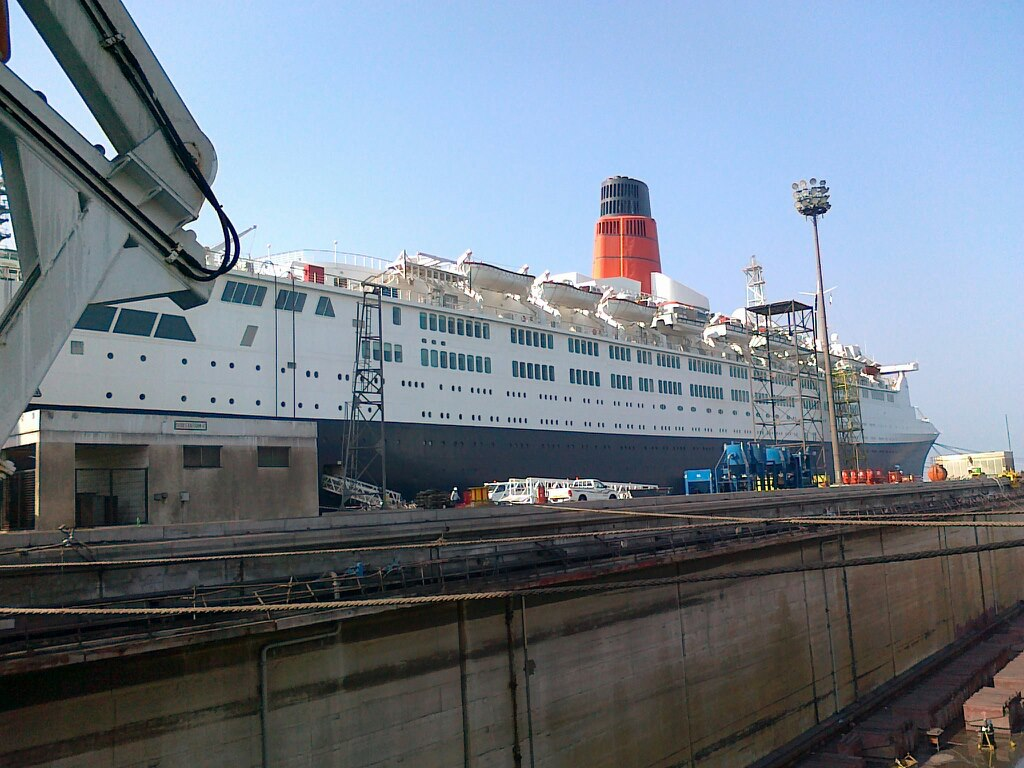
At Drydock World Dubai in 2012

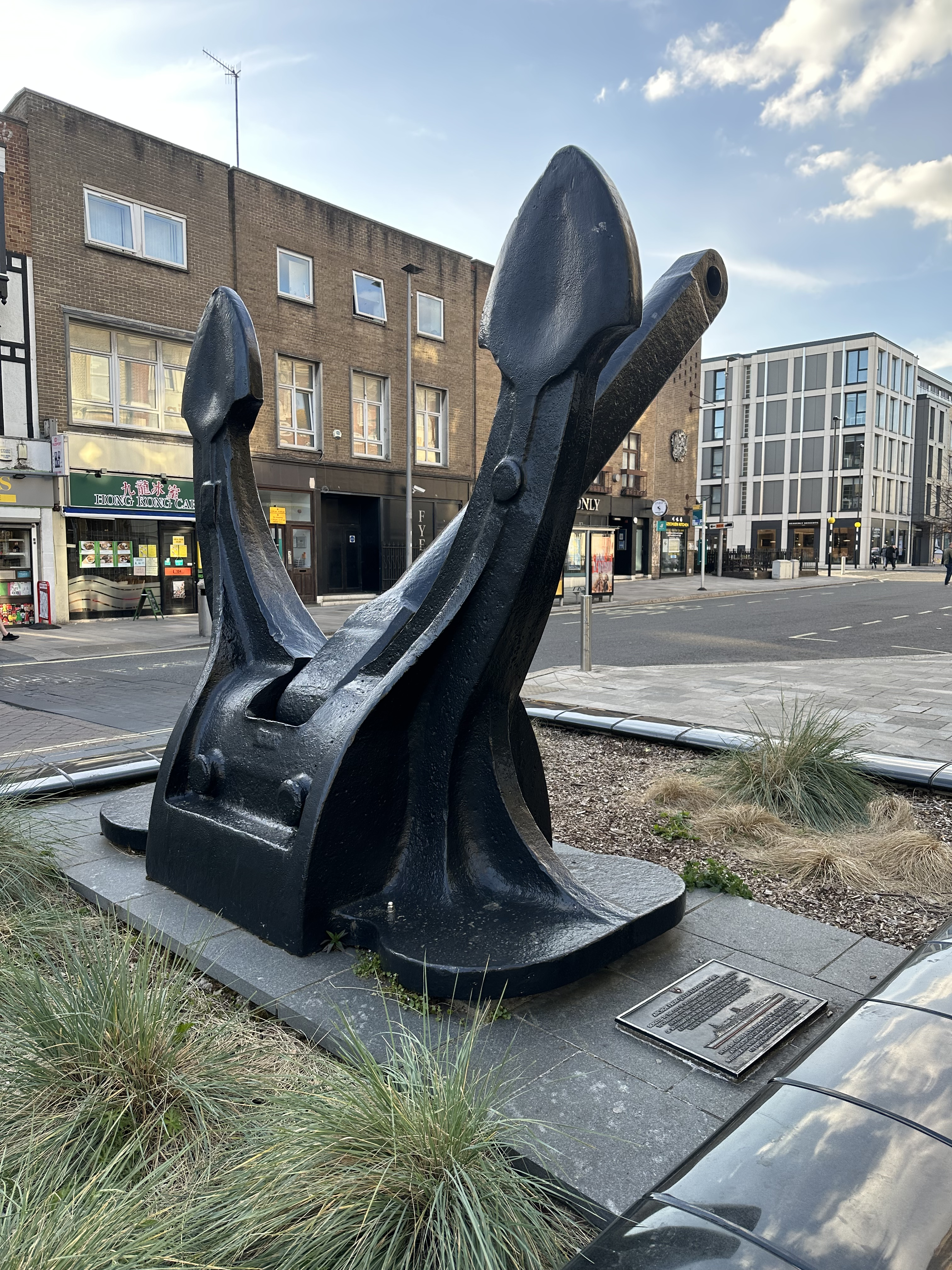
Anchor from Queen Elizabeth 2 donated to the city of Southampton by Cunard in March 2010

In early 2010, due to the continued poor financial performance of Dubai World, there was much media speculation that QE2, along with other assets owned by Istithmar, Dubai World's private-equity arm, would be sold to raise capital. Despite this sale speculation, a number of alternative locations for QE2 were cited including London, Singapore, Clydebank, Japan and Fremantle, the latter showing interest in using QE2 as a hotel for the ISAF Sailing World Championships to be held in December 2011. However, as at June 2010 Nakheel's official statement regarding QE2 was that "a number of options being considered for QE2".

On 28 January 2011 during a heavy dust storm, QE2 broke loose from her moorings and drifted out into the channel at Port Rashid. She was attended by pilots and tugs and safely returned to berth at Port Rashid. Images of QE2's unexpected movements appeared on-line after being taken by an observer on the ship in front of QE2.

Throughout 2011 and 2012, QE2 remained berthed at Port Mina Rashid in Dubai in 2011. She was maintained in a seaworthy condition and generated her own power. Each of her nine diesel generators were turned over and used to power the ship. A live-in crew of approximately 50 people maintained QE2 to a high standard. Activities include painting, maintenance, cabin checks, and overhauls of machinery. Istithmar were considering plans for QE2 which could have involved the ship sailing to an alternative location under her own power.

On 21 March 2011, QM2 called in Dubai and docked close to QE2. During the departure, the two ships sounded their horns.

On 28 September 2011 news circulated that a plan was being formulated to return QE2 to the United Kingdom by berthing her in Liverpool. Liverpool has a historic connection with Cunard Line being the first British home for the line as well as housing the iconic Cunard Building.

It was revealed that Liverpool Vision, the economic development company responsible for Liverpool's regeneration, has been involved in confidential discussions with Out of Time Concepts, a company headed by a former Chief Engineer on the ship, who recently advised its current owners on plans to turn it into a luxury hotel in Dubai.

In a letter from Out of Time Concepts to Liverpool Vision, it was explained that "The free global media attention derived from bringing home Queen Elizabeth 2 will without question promote Liverpool's new waterfront developments, its amazing architecture, its maritime and world heritage sites, its museums, its culture and its history".

On the same week that the Liverpool Vision plans were revealed, Nakheel stated that plans for QE2 to be berthed at The Palm had been dropped because they now planned to build 102 houses on the site which was once intended to be named the QE2 Precinct.

Nakheel suggested that Queen Elizabeth 2, under the ownership of Istithmar, would remain at Port Rashid to become an integral part of the growing cruise terminal. "The QE2 would be placed in a much better location", Ali Rashid Lootah, the chairman of Nakheel, told Dubai's The National newspaper "The Government of Dubai is developing an up-to-date modern cruise terminal which will mean a better environment", confirming the ship would remain in Dubai for the foreseeable future.

On 31 December 2011, Queen Elizabeth 2 was the location of a lavish New Year's Eve party in Dubai. The black tie event was run by Global Event Management and included over 1,000 guests. In early 2011 Global Event Management were offering events aboard QE2 in Dubai for 2012 and 2013.

=== Cold layup (2012–2018) ===
On 2 July 2012 in a coordinated press release, the ship's owner, operator and Port Rashid operator, DP Ports, jointly announced QE2 would re-open as a 300-bed hotel after an 18-month refit. The release claims the ship was to be refitted to restore original features, including her 1994–2008 'Heritage Trail' of classic Cunard artefacts. The ship was to be berthed alongside a redeveloped Port Rashid cruise terminal which would double as a maritime museum.

On 23 December 2012, it was reported that QE2 had been sold for scrapping in China for £20 million, after a bid to return her to the UK was rejected. With monthly berthing and maintenance charges of £650,000, it was reported that a Chinese salvage crew arrived at the vessel on 21 December, to replace a crew of 40 which has been maintaining the vessel since it arrived at Port Rashid. However, Cunard dismissed the reports as "pure speculation". When the ship was sold in 2007, a clause in the contract which started from her retirement in 2009 stipulated a ten-year "no onward sale" clause, without payment of a full purchase price default penalty.

The "QE2 London" Plan had included a £20 million bid for QE2 and a further £40 million refurbishment that was supposed to create more than 2,000 jobs in London, with Queen Elizabeth 2 docked near the O2 Arena. It had reportedly obtained the support of the then London Mayor Boris Johnson.

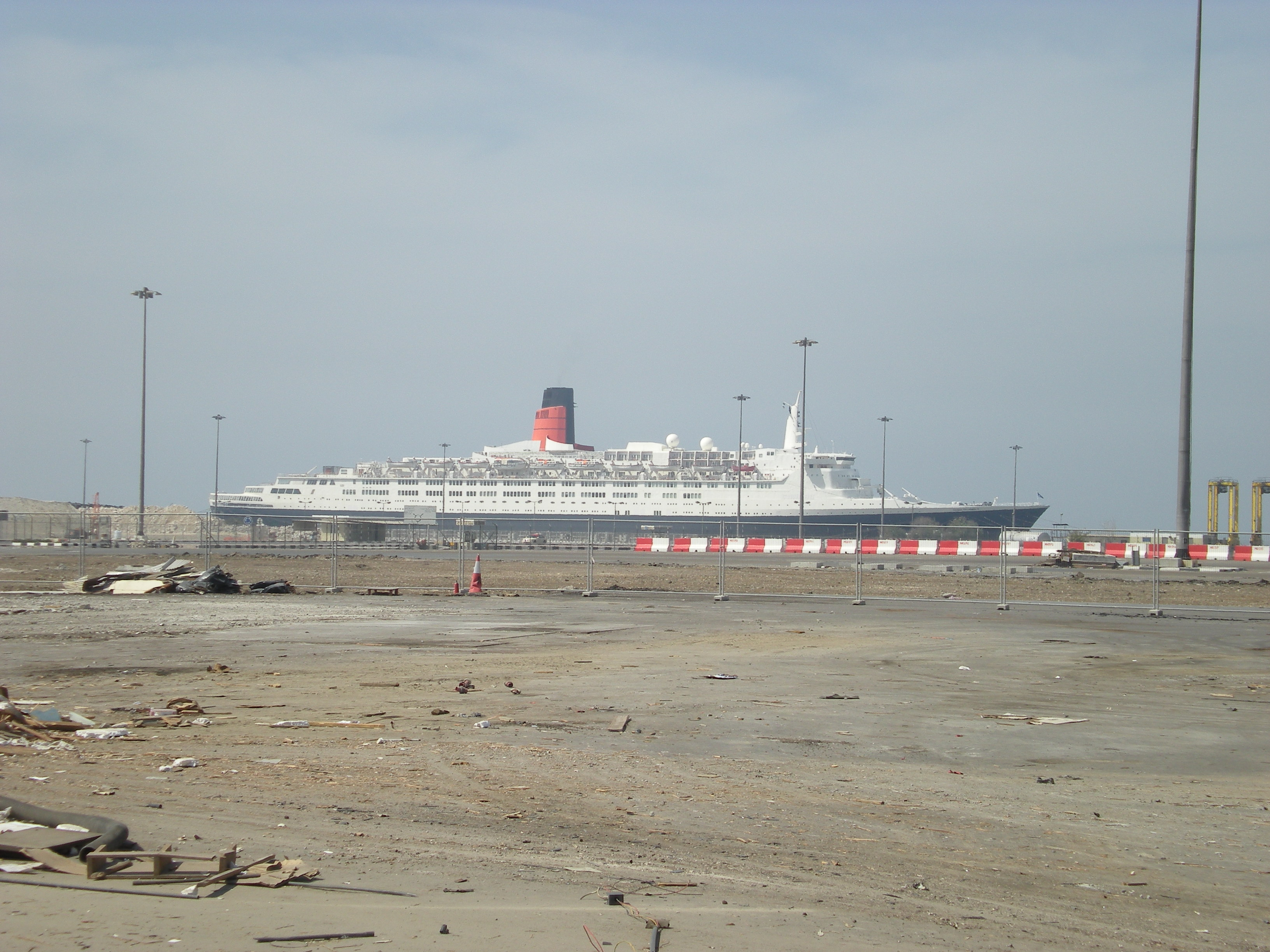
QE2 in Dubai with Cunard titles removed from her superstructure

On 17 January 2013, the Dubai Drydocks World announced that Queen Elizabeth 2 would be sent to an unknown location in Asia to serve as a floating luxury hotel, shopping mall, and museum. Despite this move, the QE2 London team stated on the same day that "We believe our investors can show Dubai that QE2 London is still the best proposal".

Cunard's 175th anniversary celebrations on 25 May 2015 led to renewed interest in Queen Elizabeth 2. John Chillingworth secured the backing of London mayor Boris Johnson for a plan to anchor the ship opposite The O2 Arena at Greenwich. A move to London however would require the ship to pass through the Thames Barrier. In late 2015 there was disagreement between ship preservation advocates and harbour authorities on whether a dead ship of her size could safely manoeuvre through the barrier. John Houston suggested returning the ship to Greenock as a maritime attraction, hotel and events space.

Inverclyde Council leader Stephen McCabe called on the UK and Scottish governments to campaign to buy the ship, saying that "Bringing the QE2 home is a Herculean task, one that requires national support in Scotland and perhaps across the UK, if it has any chance of happening." In January 2016 Aubrey Fawcett, the chair of the working group to regenerate the Clyde, admitted defeat in this effort as QE2's owners refused to respond to any requests regarding her condition or sale. "Consequently, we must conclude that it is highly unlikely that Scotland features in the future plans for the vessel."

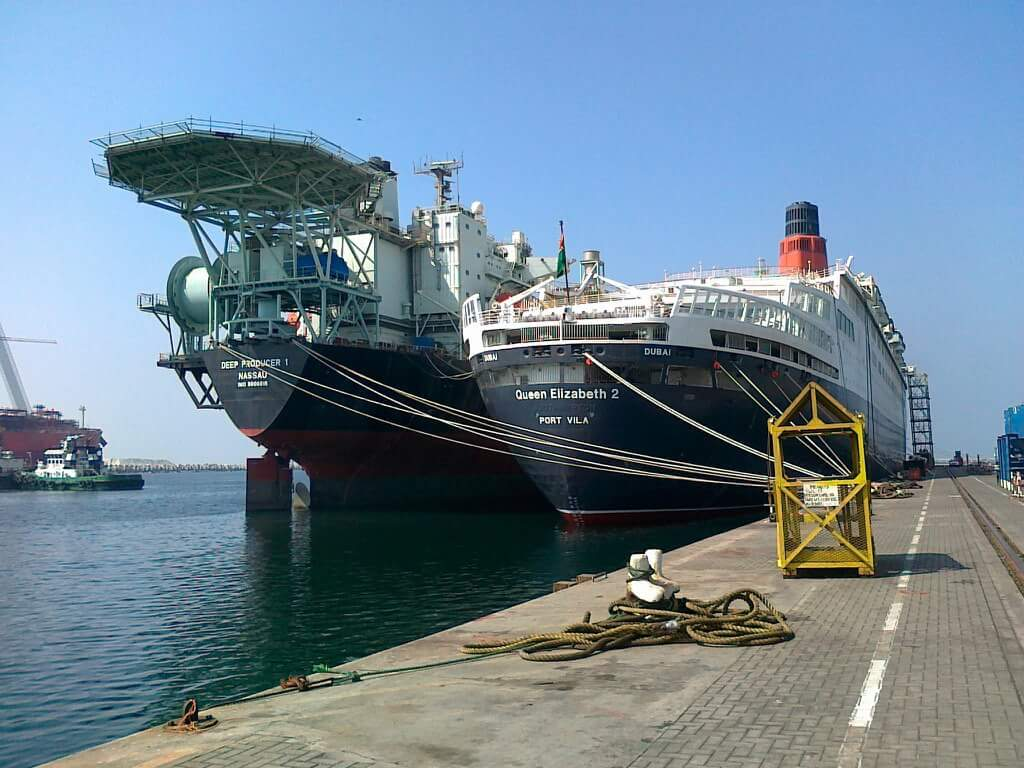
QE2 moored at Port Rashid, Dubai, in late October 2015

On 12 August 2015, the QE2 was observed to have been moved from her berth within Dubai Dry Docks, where she had been since January 2013, to a more open location within Port Rashid. On 17 November 2015, QE2 was again moved within Port Rashid, to the former cruise terminal. It was not known whether these recent moves are connected with any of the publicly known plans regarding the ship's fate.

Between May and August 2016, observers noted that the ship's lifeboats were lowered and stored on a nearby car park. Following this, the lifeboat davits were removed in September, giving the ship an altered profile on her boat deck. Subsequently, the wooden decking was removed from the deck and replaced by synthetic block flooring.

=== 50th anniversary and reactivation (2017–2018) ===
September 2017 marked the 50th anniversary of QE2's launch. To mark the occasion, Cunard Line, the ship's former owners, arranged a commemorative voyage aboard MS Queen Elizabeth – a 17-night cruise, with special activities and theme days. Meanwhile, in Glasgow, the QE2 Story Forum hosted a 50th anniversary conference with Captain Nick Bates as a speaker. Several books were released for the anniversary, including Building the Queen Elizabeth 2 by Cunard historian Michael Gallagher, and QE2: A 50th Anniversary Celebration by Chris Frame and Rachelle Cross.

It was during these festivities that news released that the ship would indeed open as a floating hotel, in 2018.

== Hotel and tourist attraction ==
Queen Elizabeth 2 reopened in Dubai as a floating hotel on 18 April 2018 following an extensive refurbishment. Over 2.7 million man-hours were committed to the work to upgrade and rebuild the ship to meet hotel standards. This included a full hull repaint and the replacing of Port Vila registry with Dubai on her stern. It was a 'soft opening' while remaining work continued.

The 4-star hotel offers accommodations, dining, and entertainment facilities while preserving many of her original maritime features.

Accommodation

The hotel offers a range of rooms and suites, each including a private bathroom. Some suites and selected rooms include private balconies with sea views. Accessible rooms are available, and all public areas aboard the ship are designed to be wheelchair accessible. Guest services include a 24-hour concierge and on-site currency exchange.

Dining

The QE2 Hotel features several dining venues offering a variety of cuisines and styles. The Lido Restaurant serves international buffet dishes, while the Queens Grill is known for its afternoon tea and traditional Sunday roast. The Chart Room by Lido retains much of the ship's original nautical interior design and serves drinks and smaller bites. The Golden Lion provides a traditional British pub experience, and the QCafé offers coffee, tea, pastries, and light fare. The Pavilion is located on deck, offering views of both the sea and the Dubai skyline.

Leisure and facilities

The ship features a spa with treatment rooms offering massages, facials, and other services, as well as a beauty salon, gym, and indoor swimming pool. A theatre on board hosts regular shows, including musical performances and plays for children. Complimentary parking is provided for hotel guests.

Heritage and events

The QE2 offers a Heritage Tour, open to both hotel guests and day visitors, that explores the ship's history and her connection to the British Royal Family. On 1 March 2024, Princess Anne visited the ship to officially open a display dedicated to the United Kingdom's Special Forces, for which she serves as Royal Patron.

On board is a new QE2 Heritage Exhibition, adjacent to the lobby, detailing the vessel's history. The ship was operated by PCFC Hotels, a division of the Ports, Customs and Free Zone Corporation, which is owned by the Dubai government. French hospitality group Accor took over operation of the hotel and attraction in May 2022. Accor announced plans to further renovate the vessel to encompass 447 rooms, and has managed the property since 2024.

== In popular culture ==
As jet travel became the primary mode of international transport, the ship transitioned from a practical use into a "floating ambassador" for British luxury and engineering. In film and television productions, the ship was used to evoke an atmosphere of British sophistication and "old-world" elegance.

QE2 has made numerous appearances in television, film, and documentaries:

- National Geographic: The Liners (1970/1997): The ship was a central subject in this documentary series, which chronicled the transition from the golden age of steam to the era of the QE2, highlighting her role in maintaining the transatlantic tradition.
- A Fast Boat to China (1984): This BBC documentary followed the QE2 on her 1984 world cruise, providing a behind-the-scenes look at the logistical complexity and high-society life aboard the vessel.
- "The Neutral Zone" (1988): In the season finale of Star Trek: The Next Generation, the ship is referenced by 20th-century survivor Ralph Offenhouse as a benchmark for a well-run vessel when compared to the USS Enterprise.
- The Saint (1989): In the TV film The Saint: Wrong Number, the ship is used as the primary setting for the climax, where Simon Templar (played by Simon Dutton) prevents a high-stakes arms deal on board.
- The Golden Girls (1991): In the episode "The Case of the Libertine Belle", the character Blanche Devereaux mentions her desire to meet a wealthy suitor on the QE2.
- Keeping Up Appearances (1993): The Christmas special episode, titled "Sea Fever", was filmed on board the ship during a voyage. It follows the character Hyacinth Bucket as she attempts to showcase her social standing while on a luxury cruise.
- As Time Goes By (1993): In the episode "The Dinner Party", characters Jean Pargetter and Lionel Hardcastle discuss a future trip on the QE2, reflecting the ship's status as a cultural icon for luxury in British media.
- Aladdin and the King of Thieves (1996): In the musical number "There's a Party Here in Agrabah," the Genie transforms into the ship while singing about the QE2 as a symbol of grand festivities.
- The Parent Trap (1998): The ship appears in the opening montage and serves as the setting where the main characters' parents first meet. While the film identifies the ship as the QE2, some deck scenes were filmed using the RMS Queen Mary as a stand-in.
- Victoria Wood with All the Trimmings (2000): A sketch featuring Victoria Wood and Julie Walters as two elderly socialites was filmed on the ship's Boat Deck and in the Queens Room.
- 50th Anniversary Celebrations (2017): The 50th anniversary of the ship's launch was marked by a special tribute voyage and extensive media coverage, highlighting her enduring status as one of the most beloved express liners in history.
