= Magrodome =

Sliding glass roof found on passenger ships

A magrodome is a sliding glass roof found aboard passenger ships. Typically positioned over a swimming pool, it can be opened and closed automatically depending on the weather .

== History ==
The first magrodome was fitted on the SS Oceanic, launched in 1963 over its Lido deck pool.

Magrodomes have since been included in a number of modern cruise ships. Some traditional liners, such as Cunard's former flagship Queen Elizabeth 2, had a magrodome retrofitted; one was placed over its existing quarterdeck pool in 1985 during a 1985 refurbishment in Bremerhaven. It was removed in a subsequent refit.

== Other notable vessels ==
- MV Aurora, completed in 2000, one of the first British based cruise ships to feature a magrodome.
- Queen Mary 2, completed in 2003, the world's largest ocean liner, has a magrodome over the Pavilion Pool and Bar.
- Ms Birka Gotland, completed in 2004, has a winter garden with a pool and artificial sun.
