= Hamper Mill House =

Coordinates: 51°38′01″N 0°24′56″W

Hamper Mill House is a grade II listed house in Hampermill Lane, near Watford in Hertfordshire, England. It was built in the late 18th-century and extended in the late 19th or early 20th-century.

Joseph Gutteridge Smith records this as his residence in 1852.

It was once the home of the interior designer Dennis Lennon.
