= Gaby Schreiber =

British industrial and interior designer

Gaby Schreiber (née Wolff, 1916–1991) was a British industrial and interior designer.

She was born Gaby Wolff in Austria. She studied art and stage and interior design in Vienna, Florence, Berlin, and Paris. She was a leading British industrial and interior designer. Schreiber was General Consultant Designer for Industry; specialist in Colour Consultancy and Interiors; advisor on purchases of works of art; Chairman Gaby Schreiber & Associates. In the 1960s she headed a small empire that comprised three companies: Gaby Schreiber and Associates, design firm; Convel Ltd, a trading company; and Convel Design International, a European design company based in Brussels. Schreiber moved to Britain with her husband, publicist Leopold Schreiber, in 1938. She arrived in Britain just before World War II, and designed for the plastics industry during the conflict. After the war, she continued designing in plastic, producing kitchen and catering equipment, tableware, cutlery and other products for cafeterias and food chain stores such as Marks & Spencer, as well as designing plastics for building structures and components. In the late 1940s she had set up her design office, building a team of specialists from different fields - interior designers, engineers, architects, graphic designers. Schreiber's design work included the interior of the Queen Elizabeth 2 ocean liner for the Cunard Line. She died in 1991.
